= Star Wars: The Empire Strikes Back (1992 video game) =

1992 video game

- North American NES box art
- Developers: Lucasfilm Games; Sculptured Software; NMS Software (GB)
- Publishers: JP: Victor Musical Industries; WW: JVC Musical Industries; NA: Capcom USA (GB); NA: Ubi Soft (1996 GB rerelease)
- Designers: Mike Ebert; Kalani Streicher
- Programmer: Ken Grant
- Artists: Harrison Fong; Armand Cabrera; Jon Knoles
- Composers: Paul Webb; Mark Cooksey (GB)
- Series: Star Wars
- Platforms: Nintendo Entertainment System, Game Boy
- Release: NES: JP: March 12, 1992; NA: March 1992; EU: 1992; Game Boy: NA: January 1993; NA: 1996 (re-release)
- Genres: Action, platform
- Mode: Single-player

Star Wars: The Empire Strikes Back is an action-platform game based on the 1980 film The Empire Strikes Back, released for the Nintendo Entertainment System in 1992. It is the sequel to the original Star Wars game released the previous year, also on the NES.

It is the second of three video games released under the Empire Strikes Back title that were developed directly for home video game systems. It was preceded by a version for the Atari 2600 and succeeded by Super Star Wars: The Empire Strikes Back for the Super NES.

== Development and release ==
The Empire Strikes Back was eventually ported to the Game Boy, being reprinted and distributed by various publishers over the course of three years. On July 26, 2019, the NES and Game Boy versions were officially re-released in both standard and Collector's Edition sets with Disney and Lucasfilms's approval in limited quantities on unlicensed replica game cartridges by Limited Run Games.

After the game was completed, the developers were occupied making Super Star Wars for the Super NES, so a corresponding NES sequel covering the film Return of the Jedi was never developed, nor released.

== Gameplay ==
Screenshot from the game's first level (NES), showing platforms, power-ups and an Imperial Probe Droid

The game features multiple objectives, such as destroying an Imperial Probe Droid, escaping a Wampa-infested ice cavern, fighting during the Battle of Hoth, locating Master Yoda on Dagobah to train with him, and attempting to rescue allies in Cloud City from Darth Vader.

Unlike in the previous game, Luke Skywalker is the only playable character. He is able to fight with a blaster pistol or a lightsaber, and can also board a snowspeeder during the Battle of Hoth. As Luke becomes stronger in the Force throughout the game, he develops multiple Force Powers that aid him along the way.

The game's ending differs drastically from the film's ending, as the player is required to both rescue Han Solo and defeat Darth Vader in combat in order to finish.

== Reception ==
Reception

Review scores
Publication	Score	
Publication	Game Boy	NES
Electronic Gaming Monthly	N/A	5/10, 5/10, 4/10, 4/10
Power Unlimited	75%	N/A
Wizard	N/A	B

Award
Publication	Award
Nintendo Power Award '92	Best Overall Game

Glenn Rubenstein of Wizard magazine praised the game's plot for its faithfulness to its source material. Although he criticized the fighting and platforming elements as tedious, he said "the more diverse sequences more than make up for it." A reviewer in Power Unlimited said the game was compared it to the previous Star Wars game calling it "mainly more of the same" while ultimately describing it as a "a fun game, although the worlds are very similar."
