= JPB =

JPB may refer to:

- Jan Peter Balkenende (born 1956), Dutch politician
- Jean-Paul Bourelly (born 1960), American guitarist
- John Perry Barlow (1947–2018), American poet and politician
- Jonathan P. Bowen (born 1956), British computer scientist
- Star Wars Episode I: Jedi Power Battles, a video game
- Peninsula Corridor Joint Powers Board, a railway agency in California
