= Star Wars video games =

Video games based on the Star Wars franchise

Star Wars
- Genre: Various
- Developers: 1982–1985: Parker Brothers; Atari, Inc.; Imagic; 1987–1995: Vektor Grafix; Namco; LucasArts; Beam Software; NMS Software; Tiertex; Software Toolworks; Realtime Associates; Totally Games; 1996–2014: LucasArts; Factor 5; HotGen; BioWare; Coolhand Int.; Ronin Entertainment; Raven Software; Vicarious Visions; Pandemic Studios; Sony Online Ent.; Rainbow Studios; Ensemble Studios; Obsidian Ent.; The Collective; Ubisoft Montreal; Magellan Interactive; Traveller's Tales (Lego Star Wars); TT Fusion (Lego Star Wars); Griptonite Games; Amaze Ent.; Exient Ent. (Angry Birds series); Rebellion Dev.; Red Fly Studio; Universomo; n-Space; Krome Studios; Petroglyph Games; 2014–present: Electronic Arts; Aspyr Media; BioWare (Star Wars: The Old Republic); Traveller's Tales (Lego Star Wars); TT Fusion (Lego Star Wars); Rovio Entertainment; Kabam; EA DICE; Respawn Entertainment
- Publishers: 1982–1985: Parker Brothers; Sinclair Research; Atari Inc.; 1987–1995: Domark; Namco; Victor / JVC; Capcom; Nintendo; U.S. Gold; Ubisoft; Kixx; Tec Toy; Sculptured Software; THQ; Black Pearl; LucasArts; 1996–2000: LucasArts; Nintendo; 2000–2014: LucasArts; Electronic Arts; THQ; Activision; Activision Blizzard; Ubisoft; THQ Wireless; Aspyr; Eidos Interactive; Feral Interactive; Rovio Entertainment (Angry Birds series); 2014–present: Electronic Arts; WB Int. Ent. (Lego Star Wars); Feral Interactive (Lego Star Wars for OS X); Disney Int. Studios (Disney Infinity 3.0)
- Platform: List: 3DO Interactive Multiplayer Apple II Atari 2600 Famicom Intellivision NES Super NES Nintendo 64 Master System Dreamcast Game Gear GameCube MS-DOS Windows Mac OS macOS Linux PlayStation 1 PlayStation 2 PlayStation 3 PlayStation 4 PlayStation 5 PlayStation Portable PlayStation Vita Xbox Xbox 360 Xbox One Xbox Series X/S Wii Wii U Game Boy Game Boy Color Game Boy Advance Nintendo DS Nintendo 3DS iOS Android Nintendo Switch Nintendo Switch 2
- First release: Star Wars: The Empire Strikes Back; July 1982
- Latest release: Star Wars: Galactic Racer; October 6, 2026
- Parent series: Star Wars

Over a hundred video games based on the Star Wars franchise have been released, dating back to some of the earliest home consoles. Some are based directly on films while others rely heavily on the Star Wars Expanded Universe.

Star Wars games have gone through three significant development eras: early licensed games (1979–1993), games developed after the creation of LucasArts (1993–2013), and games created after the closure of LucasArts (2014–present).

The first Star Wars games were developed by a variety of companies after Star Wars creator George Lucas licensed the rights to Star Wars video games; several of these games were released under the Lucasfilm Games banner. Early licensed games, released during the 8-bit and 16-bit eras of gaming, barely featured any kind of narrative, and many were action titles that either retold the stories of the original trilogy (1977–1983) or focused on a single scene of a film.

Later on, Lucas took interest in the increasing success of the video game market, and decided to create his own video game development company, LucasArts, so he could have more creative control over the games and their narratives. During this era, graphics evolved enough for games to be able to tell complex narratives, leading to games that featured more advanced retellings of the stories of the films, with voice-overs and CGI cut scenes, as well as original titles with new narratives that were set in the same continuity as the films. After The Walt Disney Company's purchase of Lucasfilm in 2012 and the closure of LucasArts the following year, the games developed during the first two eras were discarded from the canon in 2014 and reassigned to the non-canonical Star Wars Legends label.

Following LucasArts' closure, the rights to produce Star Wars video games were reassigned solely to Electronic Arts. Games published during this era are considered canonical to the franchise, and have featured more influence from the Lucasfilm Story Group, responsible for managing aspects of Star Wars canon. The EA Star Wars license had been set to expire in 2023, but in 2021, Lucasarts announced new partnerships for others to produce Star Wars and other Lucasfilm games alongside Electronic Arts.

Although many hobbyists and independent game developers have created freeware games based on the Star Wars movie series and brand, this page lists only the games that have been developed or published by LucasArts, or officially licensed by Lucasfilm.

The estimated sales figure for the overall franchise is unknown. Lego Star Wars sub-series has reportedly sold 50 million copies, while Star Wars games published by Electronic Arts have sold 52 million copies.

== Early licensed games (1979–1993) ==
In 1978, Apple Computer produced an unlicensed Star Wars game on cassette tape for its Apple II. As a "space pilot trainee", the player destroys TIE fighters using a first-person heads-up display. The first video game cartridge bearing the name Star Wars appeared that year on the RCA Studio II clones Sheen M1200 and Mustang Telespiel Computer.

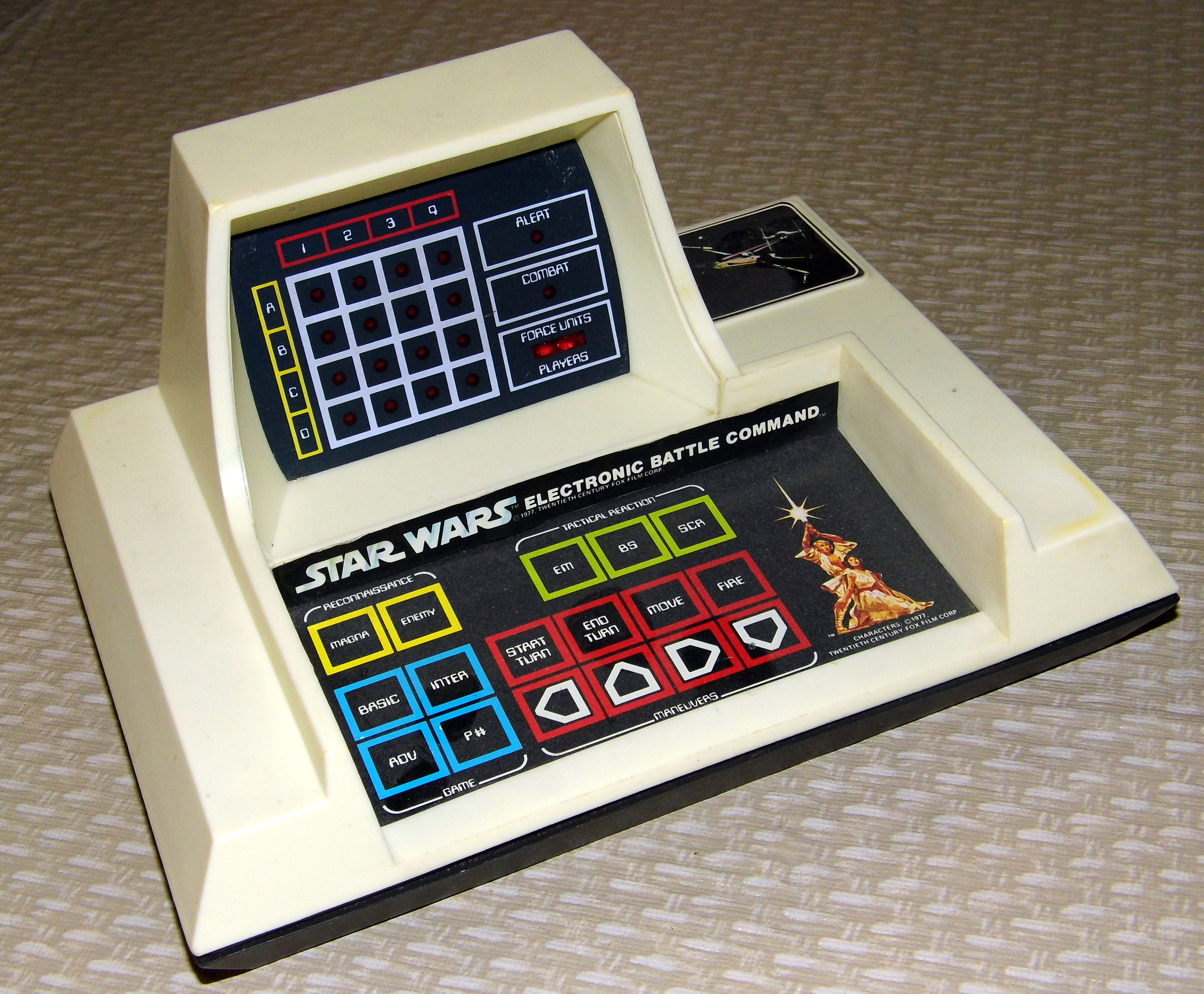
The Star Wars Electronic Battle Command electronic game

The first official licensed Star Wars electronic game was Kenner's 1979 table-top Star Wars Electronic Battle Command. The game had three levels of play (basic, intermediate, and advanced). Players took turns examining star systems with the aim of avoiding black holes, locating enemies, and searching for MAGNA, "the FORCE-giving star". The game was billed as "the most exciting computer game you will ever play".

=== The original trilogy ===
Licensed releases for the Atari 2600 began with The Empire Strikes Back (1982) in which the player piloted a snowspeeder during the Battle of Hoth, destroying AT-AT walkers. Several other games appeared, such as Return of the Jedi: Death Star Battle (1983), in which the player controlled the Millennium Falcon in a mission to destroy the second Death Star, and Jedi Arena (1983), the first game to attempt to simulate a lightsaber battle (in this case, clearly inspired by the Star Wars scene, where Luke Skywalker trains with a seeker). In 1983, the Star Wars arcade game was released by Atari based on the 1977 film. In this game (featuring color vector graphics and the first ever digitized speech from a film) the player enters the seat of Luke's Red Five X-Wing fighter, battles waves of TIE fighters led by Darth Vader, weaves through towers across the surface of the Death Star, and plummets through the battle station's trench in an attempt to destroy it. The sequel for the game, The Empire Strikes Back, used the same technology to re-create scenes from the second film, including battles with AT-AT walkers and an asteroid field.

In 1987, UK software publisher Domark released several 8-bit versions of the Star Wars vector arcade game, followed by similar conversions in 1988 of The Empire Strikes Back machine. In 1987, Namco developed a Star Wars game for the Nintendo Family Computer (Famicom) for the Japanese market exclusively, based on the 1977 film, but with several liberties taken with its storyline.

In 1991, the platform game Star Wars was released for the Nintendo Entertainment System, Master System, Game Boy and Game Gear, and one year later, Star Wars: The Empire Strikes Back covered the plotline of the fifth episode of the saga. Also in 1992, Super Star Wars was released for the SNES, followed by the remaining games in the trilogy: Super Star Wars: The Empire Strikes Back (1993) and Super Star Wars: Return of the Jedi (1994), the latter also receiving conversions for the Game Boy and Game Gear in 1995.

The following is a list of Star Wars games that are based on the feature films, developed during this development era:

==== Episode IV: A New Hope ====
- Star Wars (1983–88) – Arcade
  - Re-released for: Atari 2600, Atari 5200, Commodore 64, Atari 8-bit computers, ColecoVision, BBC Micro, ZX Spectrum,[Acorn Electron, Amstrad CPC, Atari ST, Apple II, MS-DOS, Mac,[Amiga.
- Death Star Interceptor (1984/85, System 3 Software Ltd) (unlicensed) – Commodore 64, ZX Spectrum
- Star Wars (1987) – Famicom
- Star Wars: Attack on the Death Star (1991) – PC-98, X68000
- Star Wars (1991–93) – NES, Game Boy, Master System,[Game Gear
- Super Star Wars (1992, the first game in the Super Star Wars trilogy) -Super NES
  - Re-released for: Wii Virtual Console, PS5, Vita]
- Star Wars Arcade (1993) – Arcade
  - Re-released for: 32X

==== Episode V: The Empire Strikes Back ====
- Star Wars: The Empire Strikes Back (1982) – Atari 2600, Intellivision
- Star Wars: The Empire Strikes Back (1985/88) – Arcade
  - Re-released for: BBC Micro, Commodore 64, ZX Spectrum, Amstrad CPC, Amiga, Atari.
- Star Wars: The Empire Strikes Back (1992) – NES, Game Boy
- Super Star Wars: The Empire Strikes Back (1993, the second game in the Super Star Wars trilogy) – SNES
  - Re-released for: Wii Virtual Console

==== Episode VI: Return of the Jedi ====
- Star Wars: Return of the Jedi – Death Star Battle (1983/84) – Atari 2600, Atari 8-bit computers, Atari 5200, ZX Spectrum
- Star Wars: Return of the Jedi (1984/88) – Arcade, BBC Micro, Commodore 64, ZX Spectrum, Amstrad CPC, Amiga, Atari ST, GameCube
- Super Star Wars: Return of the Jedi (1994, the third game in the Super Star Wars trilogy) – SNES, Game Boy, Game Gear
  - Re-released for: Wii Virtual Console
- Canceled: Star Wars: Return of the Jedi – Ewok Adventure – Atari 2600 (unreleased)

=== Stand-alone titles ===
==== 1980s ====
- Star Wars: Jedi Arena (1983) – Atari 2600
  - Re-released for: Mobile (2005)
- Star Wars: Droids (1988) – Amstrad CPC, ZX Spectrum – based on the Star Wars: Droids series

== LucasArts and modern self-published games (1993–2013) ==
In the early 1980s George Lucas decided to invest in videogames. So through Lucasfilm, Lucas started his own video game company, which he named LucasArts. However, since Lucas had already licensed the rights to develop Star Wars games, the company instead developed original adventure games and World War II flight combat games. LucasArts regained the rights to develop Star Wars games in 1993, at that point the videogame company put their previous experience in flight simulators to use, and released a Star Wars: X-Wing, the first self-published Star Wars video game and the first space flight simulation based on the franchise.

=== The Prequel trilogy ===
==== The Phantom Menace ====
- Star Wars: Episode I – The Phantom Menace (1999) – Windows, PlayStation
- Star Wars: Episode I (1999) – Pinball
- Star Wars Episode I: Racer (1999) – Windows, Mac, Dreamcast, Nintendo 64, Game Boy Color
  - Re-released for: Nintendo Switch (2020), PlayStation 4 (2020), and Xbox One (2020)
- Star Wars: Racer Arcade (2000) – Arcade
- Star Wars Episode I: Jedi Power Battles (2000/01) – PlayStation, Dreamcast, Game Boy Advance
- Star Wars Episode I: Battle for Naboo (2000/01) – Nintendo 64, Windows
- Star Wars Episode I: Obi-Wan's Adventures (2000) – Game Boy Color
- Star Wars: Starfighter (2001) – Windows, PlayStation 2, Xbox, Arcade
  - Star Wars: Starfighter Special Edition (2001) Xbox
  - Star Wars: Starfighter (2003) Arcade
- Star Wars: Obi-Wan (2001) – Xbox

After the release of Episode I in theaters in 1999, games from the prequel trilogy were released for most major platforms. The first releases were video game adaptation (action-adventure) and Star Wars Episode I: Racer, based on the podracing sequence in movie. Others, including Battle for Naboo and Jedi Power Battles, were released, but with little success. The first strategic game in the Star Wars expanded universe was titled Star Wars: Rebellion and broke new ground in that it incorporated ships and planets not found in the original canon, such as the Rebel Assault Frigate and the Bulwark Cruiser. But for all its ground-breaking new looks, it was not as successful as would have been hoped. The second strategic title, Star Wars: Force Commander was also released, but failed to keep up with other RTS games, since it was more focused on battling (with no resource gathering) and used a primitive 3D engine. About a decade later, resource gathering lost popularity in favor of faster-paced combat-centric RTS games.

==== Attack of the Clones ====
- Star Wars: Jedi Starfighter (2002) PlayStation 2, Xbox
- Star Wars: The Clone Wars (2002) (Action) PlayStation 2, GameCube, Xbox
- Star Wars: Episode II – Attack of the Clones (2002) – Game Boy Advance
- Star Wars: The New Droid Army (2002) – Game Boy Advance

In 2002, Attack of the Clones premiered in theaters, and another wave of Star Wars based games, including The Clone Wars, Star Wars Racer Revenge, and Bounty Hunter were released, this time focusing on events and characters from Attack of the Clones such as bounty hunter Jango Fett and the Clone Wars.

Star Wars: Jedi Starfighter was released, allowing the player to be a Jedi Master flying a Jedi starfighter. A third RTS game with a much more conventional approach to the genre's norms and using the Age of Kings engine, Star Wars: Galactic Battlegrounds, offered a better alternative to those seeking strategy in the Star Wars universe.

==== Revenge of the Sith ====
- Star Wars: Episode III – Revenge of the Sith (2005) – PlayStation 2, Xbox
  - Handheld and mobile: Nintendo DS, Game Boy Advance, Mobile

Adjoining the release of Revenge of the Sith, a video game adaptation (action) was also released close to the premiere, with various degrees of success. Star Wars: Republic Commando was also released in 2005.

=== Star Wars: The Clone Wars animated series ===
- Star Wars: The Clone Wars – Lightsaber Duels (2008) – Wii
- Star Wars: The Clone Wars – Jedi Alliance (2008) – Nintendo DS
- Star Wars: The Clone Wars – Republic Heroes (2009) – Windows, PlayStation 2, Nintendo DS, PlayStation Portable, Xbox 360, PlayStation 3, Wii
- Clone Wars Adventures (2010) – Windows, Mac (Shutdown)

=== Legends franchises ===
Formerly known as Star Wars Expanded Universe, this continuity was renamed into Legends in 2014 and all media based on them, including video games, ceased to be canon. The X-Wing series marked the start of the Star Wars games moving away from remaking the official films and began to focus more on the Expanded Universe. Other titles were published or licensed by LucasArts, such as The Software Toolworks's Star Wars Chess who also used the first "multimedia explosion" to release Rebel Assault (1993), which used FMV and photos extensively.

The 1996 Nintendo 64 title Star Wars: Shadows of the Empire was part of a LucasArts attempt to create a story between The Empire Strikes Back and Return of Jedi, putting the player in control of mercenary Dash Rendar. Shadows of the Empire featured fan-favorite parts from the Super Star Wars line, such as another reenactment of the Battle of Hoth, piloting a snowspeeder and tying a cable around AT-ATs legs. After the original trilogy was re-released as the "Special Editions" in 1997, LucasArts published other titles, including Star Wars: Yoda Stories and Star Wars Monopoly, as well as a Star Wars-themed fighting game, Star Wars: Masters of Teräs Käsi.

==== X-Wing ====
- Star Wars: X-Wing (1993) – DOS, Macintosh
  - Expansion(s): Imperial Pursuit (1993) and B-Wing (1993)
  - Compilation: X-Wing (Collector's CD-ROM) (1994)
- Star Wars: TIE Fighter (1994) – DOS, Macintosh
  - Expansion(s): Defender of the Empire (1994)
  - Compilation: TIE Fighter (Collector's CD-ROM) (1995)
- Star Wars: X-Wing vs. TIE Fighter (1997) – Windows
  - Expansions: Balance of Power Campaigns (1997), and Flight School (1998)
- Star Wars: X-Wing Alliance (1999) – Windows

Star Wars: X-Wing was one of the best-selling games of 1993, and established the beginning of the X-Wing computer game series, which garnered numerous awards and recognition. Star Wars: X-Wing was followed by several sequels and expansions, such as Star Wars: TIE Fighter, Star Wars: X-Wing vs. TIE Fighter, and Star Wars: X-Wing Alliance.

==== Rebel Assault ====
- Star Wars: Rebel Assault (1993) DOS, Mac, Sega CD, 3DO
- Star Wars: Rebel Assault II: The Hidden Empire (1995) DOS, PlayStation, Mac

==== Jedi Knight ====
- Star Wars: Dark Forces (1995) DOS, Mac, PlayStation
- Star Wars Jedi Knight: Dark Forces II (1997) Windows
  - Expansion(s): Star Wars Jedi Knight: Mysteries of the Sith (1998) Windows
- Star Wars Jedi Knight II: Jedi Outcast (2002) Windows, Mac, Xbox, GameCube
- Star Wars Jedi Knight: Jedi Academy (2003) Windows, Mac, Xbox

The first step towards modern games was done with 1995's Dark Forces, the first Star Wars first-person shooter video game. A hybrid adventure game incorporating puzzles and strategy, it featured new gameplay features and graphical elements not then common in other games, made possible by LucasArts' custom-designed game engine, called the Jedi. The game was well received and well reviewed, the game put the player in the role of Kyle Katarn, who would later appear in multiple games, novels, and comics. After the Special Edition original trilogy re-release in 1997, LucasArts published Star Wars Jedi Knight: Dark Forces II, then Star Wars Jedi Knight: Mysteries of the Sith released in 1999. In 2002, its sequel Jedi Outcast was released and gave players the first chance to experience advanced lightsaber duels, and it also detached itself from the usual idea of movie tie-ins. One year later, the last game in the Jedi Knight series, Jedi Academy was released. Katarn is a former Imperial stormtrooper who joins the Rebellion and ultimately becomes a Jedi, a plot arc similar to that of Finn in the 2015 film The Force Awakens.

==== Rogue Squadron ====
- Star Wars: Rogue Squadron (1998) Windows, Nintendo 64
- Star Wars Rogue Squadron II: Rogue Leader (2001) GameCube
- Star Wars Rogue Squadron III: Rebel Strike (2003) GameCube
  - Note: The co-op campaign of Star Wars Rogue Squadron III: Rebel Strike, is composed of all the missions of the single player campaign of the previous game, Rogue Leader (except for two missions which are not included), and such missions can only be played in multiplayer, and can not be played in single-player. Additionally as a bonus, the game includes the arcade games of Star Wars, The Empire Strikes Back, and Return of the Jedi.

==== Star Wars Racer ====
- Star Wars Episode I: Racer (1999) Windows, Mac, Dreamcast, Nintendo 64
  - Handheld: Game Boy Color
- Star Wars: Racer Arcade (2000) Arcade
- Star Wars Racer Revenge (2002) PlayStation 2
  - Re-released for: PlayStation Store (2015), PlayStation 4 (2019)
- Racer-related title:
  - Star Wars: Super Bombad Racing (2001) PlayStation 2

==== Galactic Battlegrounds ====
- Star Wars: Galactic Battlegrounds (2001) Windows, Mac
  - Expansion(s): Star Wars: Galactic Battlegrounds: Clone Campaigns (2002) Windows, Mac

==== Starfighter ====
- Star Wars: Starfighter (2001) Windows, PlayStation 2
  - Star Wars: Starfighter Special Edition (2001) Xbox
  - Star Wars: Starfighter (2003) Arcade
- Star Wars: Jedi Starfighter (2002) Xbox, PlayStation 2

==== Knights of the Old Republic ====
- Star Wars: Knights of the Old Republic (2003) Windows, Xbox, Mac, iOS, Android
- Star Wars: Knights of the Old Republic II: The Sith Lords (2004) Windows, Xbox, Mac
- Star Wars: The Old Republic (2011) (MMORPG) Windows
  - Expansion(s): Rise of the Hutt Cartel (2013), Galactic Starfighter (2014), Galactic Strongholds (2014), Shadow of Revan (2014), Knights of the Fallen Empire (2015), Knights of the Eternal Throne (2016), Onslaught (2019) and Legacy of the Sith (2021)
- Star Wars: Knights of the Old Republic Remake (TBA) PlayStation 5, Windows
- Canceled: Star Wars: Knights of the Old Republic III Windows, Xbox
    - Mobile: Star Wars Knights of the Old Republic (2013) iOS, Android

In 2003, Knights of the Old Republic, a BioWare RPG that debuted on the Microsoft Xbox and PC. Knights (also known as KotOR among fans) was critically acclaimed, even winning "Game of the Year" at the Game Developers Choice Awards, (along with many other critics) in 2003. Knights of the Old Republic II: The Sith Lords was developed by Obsidian Entertainment and released in 2004. The Sith Lords was praised for its cerebral writing and moral ambiguity, similar to The Empire Strikes Back, but criticized for being derivative of the first game and being released in an incomplete state. Another MMORPG titled Star Wars: The Old Republic was developed by BioWare, which released globally on 20 December 2011. Pre-orders went up for sale in July 2011 and open beta weekends were confirmed for September 2011.

==== Star Wars: Battlefront (Pandemic Studios) ====
- Star Wars: Battlefront (2004) PlayStation 2, Windows, Xbox, Mac
- Star Wars: Battlefront II (2005) PlayStation 2, Windows, Xbox, PlayStation Portable
- Canceled: Star Wars: Battlefront III (2008) (PC, PS3, Xbox 360)
  - Handheld:
    - Star Wars Battlefront: Renegade Squadron (2007) PlayStation Portable
    - Star Wars Battlefront: Elite Squadron (2009) PlayStation Portable, Nintendo DS
  - Mobile:
    - Star Wars: Battlefront Mobile (2005)
    - Star Wars Battlefront: Mobile Squadrons (2009)

Pandemic Studios' Battlefront consisted of two games, Star Wars: Battlefront (2004) and Star Wars: Battlefront II in 2005, both games sharing three common platforms: the Xbox, PlayStation 2 and PC.

A third Star Wars: Battlefront title was planned for 2006 but was cancelled. Two spin-offs were released, Star Wars Battlefront: Renegade Squadron, released in 2007 for the PlayStation Portable and Star Wars Battlefront: Elite Squadron on 3 November 2009 for the Nintendo DS and the PlayStation Portable. Elite Squadron is the first Battlefront game to offer a transition from space to ground battles at the players choice. After Disney's acquisition of Lucasfilm and the restructuring of the Star Wars canon, the Battlefront series was rebooted by EA DICE.

==== Empire at War ====
- Star Wars: Empire at War (2006) Windows, Mac OS X
  - Expansion(s): Star Wars: Empire at War: Forces of Corruption (2006) Windows

Compilation: Star Wars: Empire at War: Gold Pack (game and expansion package) (2007) Windows

==== The Force Unleashed ====
- Star Wars: The Force Unleashed (2008) Windows, Mac OS, Xbox 360, PlayStation 3, PlayStation 2, Wii
  - Complete edition re-release with all DLCs: Star Wars: The Force Unleashed – Ultimate Sith Edition (2009) Windows, Mac OS, Xbox 360, PlayStation 3
    - Handheld: PlayStation Portable, Nintendo DS, iOS (Star Wars: The Force Unleashed Mobile)
- Star Wars: The Force Unleashed II (2010) Windows, Xbox 360, PlayStation 3, Wii
    - Handheld: Nintendo DS, iOS

Star Wars: The Force Unleashed, released for the PlayStation 3, Xbox 360 and Wii, uses a new, detailed graphics engine. The Wii version utilizes the motion sensing and accelerometer capabilities of the Wii Remote (simulating the ability to swing a lightsaber) and its Nunchuk attachment (used to perform Force powers). Its sequel, Star Wars: The Force Unleashed II, was released in the United States on 26 October 2010.

=== Stand-alone games ===
==== 1990s ====
- Star Wars: Shadows of the Empire (1996) (third-person shooter) Nintendo 64, Windows
- Star Wars: Masters of Teräs Käsi (1997) (Fighting) PlayStation
- Star Wars: Yoda Stories (1997) (Adventure) Windows
  - Handheld: (1997) Game Boy Color
- Star Wars: Rebellion (Star Wars: Supremacy – UK) (1998) (Real-time strategy) Windows
- Star Wars Trilogy Arcade (1998) (Rail shooter) Arcade
- Star Wars Millennium Falcon CD-ROM Playset (1998) (Rail shooter-adventure) Windows

==== 2000s ====
- Star Wars: Force Commander (2000) (Real-time strategy) Windows
- Star Wars: Demolition (2000) (Vehicular combat) PlayStation, Dreamcast
- Star Wars: Bounty Hunter (2002) (Third person action) GameCube, PlayStation 2, Xbox
- Star Wars: Republic Commando (2005) (First person shooter) Xbox, Windows
  - Mobile: Star Wars: Republic Commando: Order 66 (2005)
- Compilation: Star Wars: The Best of PC (2006) (Compilation) Windows

==== 2010s ====
- Star Wars Battle Pod (2014) (Rail shooter) Arcade

==== Stand-alone handheld and mobile games ====
The following is a list of Star Wars titles that are handheld and mobile games. Additional handheld and mobile games are listed above. Unless otherwise mentioned, these games are also released for mobile phones.

- Star Wars: Flight of the Falcon (2003) (Action/Space simulation) Game Boy Advance
- Star Wars Trilogy: Apprentice of the Force (2004) Game Boy Advance
- Star Wars: Battle For The Republic (2005)
- Star Wars: Grievous Getaway (2005)
- Star Wars Imperial Ace 3D
- Star Wars: The Battle Above Coruscant (2005)
- Star Wars: Lightsaber Combat (2005)
- Star Wars Trivia (2005)
- Star Wars: Ask Yoda (2005)
- Star Wars: Puzzle Blaster (2005)
- Star Wars: Lethal Alliance (2006) (Action-adventure) PlayStation Portable, Nintendo DS – set between episodes III & IV
- Star Wars Cantina (2010)
- Star Wars: Trench Run (2009) – iOS, Unity
- Star Wars Battle of Hoth (2010)
- Star Wars Arcade: Falcon Gunner (2010)
- Star Wars: Imperial Academy (2010)
- Star Wars: Force Collection (2013)
- Star Wars: Tiny Death Star (2013)

=== Miscellaneous games ===
The following games are more of Star Wars themed, rather than actually influencing the franchise's fictional plot, they are classified together because of sharing the same genre, rather than officially being part of the same series. Excluded are the games listed above.

==== Jakks Pacific Plug It In & Play TV Games ====
- Star Wars: Lightsaber Battle Game (2005) Handheld TV game
- Star Wars: Revenge of the Sith (2005) – Jakks Pacific TV Game
  - Star Wars GameKey (expansion) (2006)
- Star Wars: Original Trilogy (2007) Jakks Pacific TV Game
- Star Wars: Republic Squadron (2009) Jakks Pacific TV Game

==== Kinect Motion Sensor ====
- Kinect Star Wars (2012) (Kinect) Xbox 360

==== Educational ====
Developed by Lucas Learning:

- Star Wars: Yoda's Challenge
- Star Wars: The Gungan Frontier
- Star Wars: Droid Works (1999) Windows, Mac
- Star Wars: Pit Droids Windows, iOS
- Star Wars Math: Jabba's Game Galaxy (Developed by Argonaut Games)
- Star Wars: JarJar's Journey Adventure Book
- Star Wars: Anakin's Speedway
- Star Wars: Early Learning Activity Center

Other educational:

- Star Wars: Behind the Magic (1998) (Multimedia encyclopedia) Windows, Macintosh
- Star Wars: Jedi Math (2008) (Educational) Leapster
- Star Wars: Jedi Reading (2008) (Educational) Leapster
- Star Wars: The Clone Wars (2008) (Platform/Educational) Didj
- Star Wars: Jedi Trials (2009) Didj

==== Star Wars Galaxies (MMO/RPG) ====
- Star Wars Galaxies: An Empire Divided (2003) Windows
  - Expansion(s): Star Wars Galaxies: Jump to Lightspeed (2004), Star Wars Galaxies: Episode III Rage of the Wookiees (2005), Star Wars Galaxies: Trials of Obi-Wan (2005),
  - Spin-off : trading card game: Star Wars Galaxies: Trading Card Games – Champions of the Force (2008, PC),

Compilations: Star Wars Galaxies: Starter Kit (2005), Star Wars Galaxies: The Total Experience (2005), and Star Wars Galaxies: The Complete Online Adventures (2006)

The first MMORPG, titled Star Wars Galaxies: An Empire Divided, was also released in 2003 and was subsequently followed in 2004 by its first expansion Jump to Lightspeed. Two more games, Star Wars Galaxies: Episode III Rage of the Wookiees (its second expansion, which ties in with the concurrently-released Revenge of the Sith), and after the films, more Star Wars titles continued to be developed and released. Empire at War (an RTS), was released in early 2006. While released and being active for years, Star Wars Galaxies' servers shut down on 15 December 2011. Notwithstanding the game's closure, there are several private emulator projects in various stages of development that intend to allow users to experience Star Wars Galaxies in different incarnations of the game's existence. However, since the game can no longer be played the way it was originally meant, the game is considered to be cancelled.

==== Closure of LucasArts and cancelled stand-alone-games ====
At E3 2012, EA with LucasArts announced Star Wars 1313, which focuses more on the life of a bounty hunter as he descends to the level 1313 on Coruscant to unravel a criminal plot. The game focuses more on gunplay and bounty hunter gameplay rather than the Force users and lightsabers combat. It was set to release in Fall 2013 for Xbox 360, PlayStation 3 and Windows. 1313 has subsequently been cancelled by LucasArts following its purchase by Disney. The following are the stand-alone Star Wars videogames that were canceled, the canceled titles that were part of a series are listed along its respective series.

- Star Wars 1313 (2013) (Action-adventure)
- Star Wars Outpost (2013)
- Star Wars: First Assault (2013) (First-person shooter)
- Star Wars: Attack Squadrons (2014)
- Star Wars: Battle of the Sith Lords (Action-adventure)
- Star Wars: Rivals (2018) (Third-person shooter)

With the 2012 acquisition of Lucasfilm by The Walt Disney Company, it was announced that LucasArts' development arm would stop making video games indefinitely. In addition to this, various online browser games have shut down their servers, and can no longer be played.

== Electronic Arts era and canon restructuring (2013–2023) ==
After LucasArts was shut down, on April 3, 2013, Disney and Lucasfilm revealed a partnership with Electronic Arts (EA) that granted EA exclusive rights to produce Star Wars games for consoles and PC for a decade, with Disney retaining the freedom to handle the games for mobile platforms, such as smartphones, tablets, and browsers. On October 14, 2014, EA released its first Star Wars video game under the Disney brand, and their deal was expected expire on October 14, 2024, where Electronic Arts was expected to leave the franchise on the designated date.

On April 24, 2014, most of the previous licensed Star Wars video games, novels, and comics produced since the originating 1977 film Star Wars were rebranded as Star Wars Legends and declared non-canon to the franchise.

Among the EA subsidiaries responsible for creating the Star Wars games within the deal, were the developers DICE, BioWare, Visceral Games, and Respawn Entertainment. After the canon restructuring, EA announced their new games would fall under the restructured canon. As of the release of Star Wars Jedi: Survivor, all EA-produced Star Wars games are considered canonical, although only the ones with an actual "story mode" narrative.

Following the massive player reception of Star Wars Battlefront II and the success of Star Wars: Jedi Fallen Order, EA CEO Andrew Wilson said that they are doubling down on the Star Wars games, meaning that a possible revival for the Battlefront series or more video games that have yet to be reported in development.

Due to the lower-than-expected sales, EA's exclusive deal was halted in January 2021, more than three years before their contract was set to expire on October 14, 2024. The lower-than-expected sales and mixed fan reception towards Electronic Arts' handling of the Battlefront sub-franchise had led to rumors of Lucasfilm considering changing the terms of the license. Lucasfilm was rumored to be courting either Ubisoft or Activision to either replace EA or share rights to develop Star Wars games with them.

=== Reboots ===
==== Battlefront (EA DICE) ====
- Star Wars Battlefront (2015) – PlayStation 4, Windows, Xbox One
  - Singleplayer and Multiplayer
- Star Wars Battlefront II (2017) – PlayStation 4, Windows, Xbox One
  - Singleplayer and Multiplayer.

After the restructuring of the Star Wars canon, the Battlefront series formerly developed by Pandemic was rebooted by EA DICE. The first game was released in 2015, rushed into the market to tie in with the release of The Force Awakens. As a result of the shorter development time, developer EA DICE decided to take a significant departure from all previous installments of the franchise and focus the game entirely on online multiplayer, completely axing the inclusion of a single player campaign or any sort of narrative; the move was heavily criticized by fans, including Finn actor John Boyega. Only original trilogy characters (Luke Skywalker, Princess Leia, Han Solo, Boba Fett, Darth Vader and Emperor Palpatine) and planets (Tatooine, Hoth and Endor) were playable on launch. Downloadable content later added the planets Jakku (from The Force Awakens), Bespin (from The Empire Strikes Back), Scarif (from Rogue One), in addition to the Death Star battle station (from A New Hope), and heroes Nien Numb, Greedo (Outer Rim), Lando Calrissian, Dengar (Bespin), Chewbacca, Bossk (Death Star), and Jyn Erso and Director Krennic (Rogue One: Scarif). The first Battlefront also received a PlayStation VR add-on mission, the Rogue One X-Wing VR Mission.

The second Battlefront is the first in the series to be considered part of the Star Wars canon. It addresses a major criticism of the previous game by including a singleplayer campaign with a story mode set between the ending of Return of the Jedi and the beginning of The Force Awakens, in which the player controls an Imperial special forces commander named Iden Versio; additionally, characters from the films, including Luke Skywalker, Leia Organa, Han Solo, Lando Calrissian and Kylo Ren are playable. The multiplayer mode features characters from the original, prequel, and sequel trilogies, as well as anthology films. Future content was originally going to be distributed in a "season" system, though this was changed to monthly updates.

=== Star Wars Jedi series ===
==== Star Wars Jedi: Fallen Order (2019) ====
Star Wars Jedi: Fallen Order is a singleplayer game developed by Respawn Entertainment. It was released on 15 November 2019, for Microsoft Windows, PlayStation 4 and Xbox One. The story revolves around a survivor of Order 66, Cal Kestis, who is on the run from the Empire and its Inquisitors. Jedi: Fallen Order takes place between Revenge of the Sith and A New Hope.

==== Star Wars Jedi: Survivor (2023) ====
Star Wars Jedi: Survivor is a singleplayer game developed by Respawn Entertainment. It was released on 28 April 2023 for Microsoft Windows, PlayStation 5 and Xbox Series X and Series S, while versions for the Xbox One and PlayStation 4 were released on 17 September 2024. The story picks up five years after Fallen Order, as Cal Kestis and his Mantis crew continue to fight against the expanding Empire.

==== Untitled third Star Wars Jedi game (TBA) ====
In September 2023, Cameron Monaghan, who provides the voice and motion capture for Cal Kestis, confirmed that a third game in the Jedi series was in development. EA president Laura Miele stated the following year that it would be the final entry of the series.

=== Star Wars: Squadrons (2020) ===
Star Wars: Squadrons is an action video game developed by Motive Studios. It was revealed on 15 June 2020, and was released on 2 October 2020, for Microsoft Windows, PlayStation 4 and Xbox One, with a singleplayer campaign and multiplayer modes, alongside cross-platform play between all three platforms and virtual reality support for the PS4 and PC versions.

=== Star Wars Zero Company (2026) ===
Star Wars Zero Company is a turn-based tactics video game developed by Bit Reactor and Respawn Entertainment. The game is set during the Clone Wars era, with players assuming control of the leader of "Zero Company", a group of misfits and mercenaries tasked with fighting an emerging threat that threatens the whole galaxy. It is set to be released in 2026 for Windows, PlayStation 5 and Xbox Series X/S.

=== Star Wars Galactic Racer (2026) ===
Star Wars: Galactic Racer is a racing video game with adventure elements developed by Fuse Games and published by Secret Mode. It consists of a single-player campaign and a multiplayer mode. In addition to the solo campaign, there is an arcade mode for quick, one-off races and a scenario mode that includes time trials and races with other objectives. It released on October 6, 2026 for PlayStation 5, Windows and Xbox Series X/S.

=== Cancelled ===
==== "Project Ragtag" ====
Prior to its closure in 2017, Visceral Games was working on an untitled game set in the time between Return of the Jedi and The Force Awakens. Amy Hennig, former Naughty Dog writer and director who oversaw the Uncharted series, joined Visceral as creative lead on the project codenamed Ragtag. On 17 October 2017, EA announced the closure of Visceral Games. EA reassigned the game to its EA Worldwide Studios, led by EA Vancouver, and said they will revamp the gameplay, which had been described as a linear, story-heavy title, into "a broader experience that allows for more variety and player agency". On 15 January 2019, Kotaku's Jason Schreier reported that the game codenamed "Project Ragtag" had been canceled according to three people familiar with goings-on at EA. Rogue One writer Gary Whitta openly criticized Electronic Arts for the cancelation, adding that he hoped Disney would hand the Star Wars licence to other companies.

=== Mobile games ===
- Star Wars: Assault Team (2014)
- Star Wars: Commander – Android, iOS, Windows Phone (2014)
- Star Wars: Galactic Defense – Android, iOS (2014). Spans both the prequel and original trilogies.
- Star Wars: Galaxy of Heroes – Android, iOS (2015). As of November 2019, the game covers the prequel, original and sequel eras, and the Expanded Universe; most of the EU content originates from the Knights of the Old Republic series of games.
- Star Wars: Uprising – Android, iOS (2015, discontinued 17 November 2016)
- Star Wars: Heroes Path – iOS (2015)
- Star Wars Rebels: Recon Missions – Android, iOS, Windows Phone (2015)
- Journeys series:
  - Journeys: The Phantom Menace – iOS (2014)
  - Journeys: Beginnings – iOS (2014)
- Star Wars: Force Arena (2017) – Force Arena was a player versus player real-time strategy mobile game for iOS and Android. It was developed and published by Netmarble Games in association with Lucasfilm. Force Arena is set in the Rebellion era of the Star Wars storyline. Players control customized squads of characters and vehicles in a multiplayer online battle arena (MOBA) environment. The roster of over 80 available characters included Luke Skywalker, Princess Leia, Han Solo, Darth Vader, Palpatine, Grand Admiral Thrawn, Grand Moff Tarkin, Doctor Aphra, Ezra Bridger, and Jyn Erso. The game was shut down in March 2019, following an announcement on 19 December 2018.

== Non-exclusive titles (2021–present) ==
In January 2021, Lucasfilm revived the Lucasfilm Games label as the licensing brand for all IP from the Lucasfilm production. This included a new Indiana Jones game to be produced by MachineGames, as well as a new open world Star Wars game to be produced by Ubisoft and Massive Entertainment, the first major non-EA Star Wars game. Lucasfilm did not speak to the state of EA's prior exclusive license to develop Star Wars games but affirmed EA would still be making such games, but stated that they "feel like there's room for others".

In February 2021, a free-to-play competitive arena combat game developed by Zynga called Star Wars: Hunters was announced. The game was released in June 2024 for the Nintendo Switch and on the Apple and Google Play appstores but was shut down 16 months later, on October 1, 2025, due to lacking commercial viability.

In September 2021 as part of the PlayStation Showcase, a remake of Knights Of The Old Republic is announced as a timed console exclusive for PlayStation 5 in development at Aspyr. Several voice actors and developers who have worked on the original are returning including Jennifer Hale as Bastila Shan.

In December 2021, during the Game Awards event, a new Star Wars game called Star Wars Eclipse was announced, set in the High Republic Era, and is being developed by Quantic Dream.

In January 2022, EA announced that Respawn had three Star Wars titles in development: A sequel to Star Wars Jedi: Fallen Order, a first-person shooter, and a strategy game with new studio Bit Reactor. The first-person shooter game was subsequently cancelled.

In December 2025, Star Wars: Galactic Racer was announced for 2026 and Star Wars: Fate of the Old Republic was announced with no release date.

== Crossovers with other franchises ==
In some cases Lucasfilm has allowed other video game franchises to do their own Star Wars games, resulting in crossover hybrid franchises, that are developed by other studios.

=== Table games ===
- Star Wars Chess (1993) (Chess engine) DOS, Sega CD, Windows
- Monopoly Star Wars (1996) Windows

=== Pinball and virtual pinball ===
==== Physical pinball ====
- The Empire Strikes Back by Hankin (1980)
- Star Wars by Data East (1992) – Star Wars is a 1992 pinball machine released by Data East. It is based on the Star Wars original trilogy of films. A semi-official update, tweaking and refining the gameplay rules was released 20 years later.
- Star Wars Trilogy by Sega Pinball (1997)
- Star Wars Episode I by Williams (1999)
- Star Wars by Stern Pinball (2017)
- Star Wars The Pin by Stern Pinball (2019)
- Star Wars: The Mandalorian by Stern Pinball (2021)
- Star Wars: Fall of the Empire by Stern Pinball (2025)

==== Virtual pinball ====
Zen Studios developed nineteen virtual pinball tables based on the Star Wars franchise, with none of them being imitations of previously released Star Wars physical pinball tables. All of them are released as downloadable content add-ons for the sequels to Pinball FX and Zen Pinball. A compilation of all 19 tables, titled Star Wars Pinball, is also available on iOS, Android and Nintendo Switch. The mobile versions of Star Wars Pinball, are paid apps whose price unlocks one particular table and all other tables are unlocked via in-app purchases, while the Switch version, released in 2019 as both a retail and digital title, includes immediate access to all tables, plus additional features. An Amazon Luna port of Star Wars Pinball has also been announced as a launch title.

Star Wars Pinball (2013) Windows, Mac, Wii U, Xbox 360, 3DS, PSVita, PlayStation 3, PlayStation 4, Kindle Fire, Android, iOS

- Star Wars Episode V: The Empire Strikes Back (2013)
- Star Wars: The Clone Wars (2013)
- Star Wars Pinball: Boba Fett

Star Wars Pinball: Balance of the Force (2013) Windows, Xbox 360, PSVita, PlayStation 3, PlayStation 4, Android, iOS

- Star Wars Episode VI: Return of the Jedi (2013)
- Star Wars Pinball: Darth Vader
- Star Wars Pinball: Starfighter Assault

Star Wars Pinball: Heroes Within (2014) Windows, Xbox 360, PSVita, PS3, PS4, Android, iOS

- Star Wars Pinball: Masters of the Force
- Star Wars Episode IV: A New Hope (2013)
- Star Wars Pinball: Droids
- Star Wars Pinball: Han Solo

Star Wars Pinball: Star Wars Rebels (2015)

Star Wars Pinball: The Force Awakens (2016)

- Star Wars Pinball: Star Wars: Resistance
- Star Wars Pinball: Might of the First Order

Star Wars Pinball: Rogue One (2017)

Star Wars Pinball: The Last Jedi (2018)

- Star Wars Pinball: Ahch-To Island
- Star Wars Pinball: The Last Jedi – Survive

Star Wars Pinball: Solo Pack (2018)

- Star Wars Pinball: Solo
- Star Wars Pinball: Calrissian Chronicles
- Star Wars Pinball: Battle of Mimban

A twentieth pinball table, based on the first season of The Mandalorian, was announced to be in development in late October 2020, along with a 21st table based on toy Star Wars action figures, titled Star Wars: Classic Collectibles. These were released for Star Wars Pinball VR on 29 April 2021, running on Unreal Engine 4 after Zen Studios announced a partnership with Epic Games to use this engine for new pinball titles, including their Pinball FX reboot which also included remastered versions of all prior Star Wars tables.

=== Lego Star Wars ===
Lego has licensed videogames based on their Lego Star Wars toys, as part of their Lego video games franchise. Due to the technical limitations of handhelds, the handheld versions always result in an entirely different game telling the same story as the console version. However, the PlayStation handheld versions tend to imitate more closely the console versions albeit with some reduced areas and features.

- Lego Star Wars: The Video Game (2005): Windows, PlayStation 2, Xbox, GameCube, Mac
  - Handheld(s): Nintendo DS, Game Boy Advance
- Lego Star Wars II: The Original Trilogy (2006): Windows, PlayStation 2, Xbox, Xbox 360, GameCube, Mac
  - Handheld(s): Nintendo DS, Game Boy Advance, PlayStation Portable
- Lego Star Wars III: The Clone Wars (2011): Windows, PlayStation 3, Xbox 360, Wii, Mac
  - Handheld(s): Nintendo DS, Nintendo 3DS, PlayStation Portable
- Lego Star Wars: The Force Awakens (2016): Windows, PlayStation 4, PlayStation 3, Xbox One, Xbox 360, Wii U, Mac
  - Handheld(s): Nintendo 3DS, PlayStation Vita
- Lego Star Wars: The Skywalker Saga (2022): Windows, PlayStation 4, PlayStation 5, Xbox One, Xbox Series S/X, Nintendo Switch

Compilation(s): Lego Star Wars: The Complete Saga (2007), consisting of Lego Star Wars: The Video Game, and Lego Star Wars II: The Original Trilogy. Windows, PlayStation 3, Xbox 360, Wii, Mac

- Handheld(s): Nintendo DS
- Mobile: iOS, Android.

==== Other Lego mobile and web browser games ====
- Lego Star Wars: The Quest for R2-D2 (2009): Unity
- Lego Star Wars: Ace Assault (2011)
- Lego Star Wars: Ace Assault 2 (2012)
- Lego Star Wars: Battle Orders (2012): Unity
- Lego Star Wars: The Yoda Chronicles (2013): Android, iOS
- Lego Star Wars: The New Yoda Chronicles (2014): Android, iOS
- Lego Star Wars: Microfighters (2014): Android, iOS
- Lego Star Wars Battles (2021): Apple Arcade
- Lego Star Wars: Castaways (2021): Apple Arcade

=== Angry Birds Star Wars ===
Rovio Entertainment made two Star Wars games.

- Angry Birds Star Wars (2012)
- Angry Birds Star Wars II (2013)

=== Disney Infinity ===
The third installment of the Disney Infinity series included Star Wars characters for the first time as playable characters, alongside characters from other franchises owned by Disney, including characters from the Marvel and Pixar films.

- Disney Infinity 3.0 (2015): Microsoft Windows, PlayStation 3, PlayStation 4, Xbox 360, Xbox One, Wii U, iOS, Android

== Cultural impact ==
=== Guest appearances of Star Wars characters in other video game franchises ===
This category refers to video games from other franchises where the inclusion of Star Wars characters is very minor and restricted only to small easter eggs or an unlockable character cameo.

==== Multiple guest-appearances in a series ====
- Tony Hawk's Pro Skater series:
  - Tony Hawk's Pro Skater 3 (2001), Activision – Skateboarding game featuring unlockable Darth Maul. (Nintendo GameCube, Xbox, PlayStation 2, PC)
  - Tony Hawk's Pro Skater 4 (2002), Activision – Skateboarding game featuring unlockable Jango Fett. (Nintendo GameCube, Xbox, PlayStation 2, PC)
- Indiana Jones series:
  - Indiana Jones and the Staff of Kings (2009), LucasArts – Action-adventure game featuring unlockable Han Solo. Wii, PlayStation 2, Nintendo DS, PlayStation Portable
  - Lego Indiana Jones series:
    - Lego Indiana Jones: The Original Adventures (2008), LucasArts – Action-adventure game featuring unlockable Han Solo and cameos from other Star Wars characters. (Wii, Nintendo DS, Xbox 360, PlayStation 3, PlayStation 2, PlayStation Portable, Windows)
    - Lego Indiana Jones 2: The Adventure Continues (2009), LucasArts – Action-adventure game featuring cameos from Star Wars characters. (Wii, Nintendo DS, Xbox 360, PlayStation 3, PlayStation Portable, Windows)
- Minecraft (2009) – Various Star Wars DLC packs with Star Wars character skins released. (PlayStation 4, Xbox One, Windows, Switch)
- Fortnite (2017) – A cosmetic Stormtrooper outfit was added to Fortnite in 2019. Din Djarin and Grogu from The Mandalorian also appeared as purchasable cosmetics in the 2020 chapter two, season five event, Zero Point. Djarin's Amban sniper rifle and his jetpack were included in the event as usable items.
- The Sims 4: Journey to Batuu (2020) – The ninth game pack for the life simulation video game The Sims 4, which is focused on adventures on the distant planet of Batuu. It was released on PC, Mac, Xbox One and PlayStation 4 on 8 September 2020.

==== Single appearances ====
- Night Shift (1990), Lucasfilm Games – Platform game featuring action figures of various Star Wars characters. Amiga, Atari ST, Commodore 64, Mac, PC, Amstrad CPC, ZX Spectrum
- Secret Weapons Over Normandy (2003), LucasArts – Flight simulation game featuring unlockable X-Wing and TIE Fighter. Xbox, PlayStation 2, PC
- Mercenaries: Playground of Destruction (2005), LucasArts – Features unlockable character Han Solo. Xbox, PlayStation 2
- Soulcalibur IV (2008), Namco Bandai Games – Fighting game. At release featuring Darth Vader in the PlayStation 3 version, with Yoda in the Xbox 360 version, and Darth Vader's apprentice Galen Starkiller Marek in both versions. Months after the release, Darth Vader and Yoda were made available for purchase as downloadable content, each at the version they were absent at release. Each of the Star Wars characters had his own ending on the "Story Mode". However, in late 2016, all of the DLC in Soulcalibur IV was removed from the PlayStation and Microsoft stores for unknown reasons. It was later revealed to be due to unexpected licensing legal problems caused by Disney's purchase of Star Wars.

=== Fan-made games ===
- Star Wars Mush was an unlicensed text-based role-playing game active in the early 1990s.

==== Galaxy in Turmoil ====
On 25 January 2016, Frontwire Studios began an attempt to produce an unofficial Battlefront installment called Galaxy in Turmoil. The fan made game was in production using Unreal Engine 4 and was based on the cancelled Star Wars: Battlefront III by Free Radical Design. Although early versions of the game contained assets from Free Radical Design, they soon became "place holders" as the full game planned to be released using assets and music made from the ground up. On 4 June 2016, Galaxy in Turmoil gained a distribution deal through Valve and was planned to be released for free on Steam which generated a fair amount of attention.

On 22 June 2016 Lucasfilm requested the production of Galaxy in Turmoil be halted. On 31 July 2016, Frontwire Studios announced the cancellation of the game was due to the "possibility of Galaxy in Turmoil taking away attention from Electronic Arts' Battlefront franchise". Proposals of Galaxy in Turmoil falling under the paywall of Electronic Arts, and ideas of Lucasfilm giving Frontwire Studios a Star Wars IP licence were both rejected due to an agreement between Electronic Arts and Lucasfilm. Although Frontwire Studios may have fallen within Fair Use laws, legal conflict was avoided and the fan made Star Wars inspired project was canceled. There is a playable alpha that contains assets from Free Radical Design that was released to the public then removed early on within Galaxy in Turmoil's lifetime. Galaxy in Turmoil is now planned to be released as a brand new "cyber-punk" themed IP without any Star Wars references, but still with Battlefront III-inspired mechanics including space-to-ground battles.
