= Star Wars: The Empire Strikes Back (1985 video game) =

1985 video game

- North American arcade flyer
- Developer: Atari Games (Note: Ports developed by Vektor Grafix.)
- Publishers: Atari Games; Ports; Domark
- Designer: Mike Hally
- Programmers: Greg Rivera; Norm Avellar
- Artist: Dave Ralston
- Composer: Brad Fuller
- Series: Star Wars
- Platforms: Arcade, Amiga, Amstrad CPC, Atari ST, BBC Micro, Commodore 64, ZX Spectrum
- Release: Arcade: NA: March 1985; Home computers: EU: July 1988
- Genre: Rail shooter
- Mode: Single-player

Star Wars: The Empire Strikes Back is a 1985 rail shooter video game developed and published by Atari Games for arcades. Based on the 1980 film The Empire Strikes Back, the game is a sequel to Atari, Inc.'s 1983 arcade game Star Wars, and was originally released as a conversion kit for said game. As in Star Wars, the player takes the role of Luke Skywalker in a set of battle sequences from a first-person perspective. The game features the Battle of Hoth and the subsequent escape of the Millennium Falcon through an asteroid field.

The Empire Strikes Back was Atari's third Star Wars arcade game, and the second to use vector graphics, having been preceded by the raster graphics game Return of the Jedi in 1984. Home ports of The Empire Strikes Back were released by Domark for the Amstrad CPC, BBC Micro, ZX Spectrum, Atari ST, Commodore 64 and Amiga in 1988.

== Gameplay ==
The Imperial walkers stage

In the Hoth sequences, the player is flying a Rebel snowspeeder. The first section has the player patrolling in a search and destroy mission for Probots (Imperial Probe Droids). Imperial transmissions emanating from the Probots can be shot to prolong the stage. Once the transmission is completed, the player advances. To earn a Jedi letter, the player must eradicate the specified number of probots.

The second snowspeeder sequence involves the assault of AT-AT and AT-ST walkers against the Rebel shield generator. The walkers have to be either destroyed or avoided, as collisions will damage the aircraft. The player has four tow-cables which can be used to take down the AT-AT walkers instantly if fired at their legs. Otherwise, the player has to aim for the red cockpits to destroy the walkers. To earn a Jedi letter, the player must eradicate the specified number of walkers.

In the second half of the game, the player takes on the role of Han Solo piloting at the head of a convoy trying to escape the Imperial onslaught. First, the player encounters a swath of TIE fighters. To earn a Jedi letter, the player must eradicate the specified number of TIE fighters. When enough time expires, the player moves on to an asteroid field, where the goal is simply to survive. To earn a Jedi letter, the player must make it through the field without dying. Once the fourth stage is completed, the game starts back at the beginning of the Battle of Hoth on a higher difficulty level.

Collecting all four Jedi letters instantly erases every enemy shot from the screen for a short time, and also adds a rank insignia next to the player's initials if they reach the high-score list. The player begins the game with a deflector shield that can absorb a set number of hits from enemies or projectiles before collapsing. If the player sustains a hit with the shield down, the game ends.

Vector objects are now much more noticeably detailed, and the asterisk-particle enemy shots resembling snowflakes from Star Wars are replaced with simpler and clearer vector star-shapes instead.

== Reception ==
Reception

Award
Publication	Award
Crash	Crash Smash

According to the creators, the game received less attention as it was not as fresh as the previous game. Additionally, it was sold as an upgrade kit, so arcade operators that had Star Wars running and getting steady incomes from it did not go for the upgrade.

Reviews of the 1988 ZX Spectrum version were positive. Crash gave it 90% and a Crash Smash award, saying it had "all the speed, playability and graphics of the arcade machine", although one of its reviewers thought the lack of levels would limit its lasting appeal. Sinclair User gave it 88%, noting that sound had been dropped to get more speed out of the Spectrum and calling it "simply the best of its ilk", while Computer and Video Games scored it 8/10 and found it close to the arcade original apart from an occasionally slow screen update. Your Sinclair also gave it 8/10; Ciaran Brennan called it fast and compulsive but thought it was a little too easy to hold the interest of experienced players.

== Legacy ==
An emulated version of The Empire Strikes Back, along with the other two Star Wars arcade games from Atari, can be unlocked for play in Star Wars Rogue Squadron III: Rebel Strike (2005).

== See also ==
- The Empire Strikes Back, a different game for the Atari 2600 and Intellivision based on the movie
