= Star Wars Episode I: Obi-Wan's Adventures =

2000 video game

- North American box art
- Developer: HotGen
- Publishers: THQ; LucasArts
- Series: Star Wars
- Platform: Game Boy Color
- Release: NA: November 24, 2000; EU: December 8, 2000
- Genre: Action-adventure
- Mode: Single-player

Star Wars Episode I: Obi-Wan's Adventures is a 2000 action-adventure game developed by HotGen and published by THQ and LucasArts for the Game Boy Color. The game, which is based on the 1999 film Star Wars: Episode I – The Phantom Menace, follows Jedi apprentice Obi-Wan Kenobi as he fights the forces of the evil Trade Federation, which culminates in a battle against the Sith Lord Darth Maul.

Obi-Wan's Adventures was the result of an agreement made between LucasArts and THQ, which allowed THQ to publish games based on LucasArts licenses for the Game Boy Color. Since its release, the game has received mixed reviews, with praise for its level and sound design and criticism for its visuals and controls.

== Gameplay ==
Obi-Wan's Adventures is an isometric action-adventure game with side-scrolling sections. Set in the fictional Star Wars galaxy, the game takes place in a time when the fictional Galactic Republic is in imbalance as a result of the antagonistic Trade Federation and the evil Sith Lord's plans to take over. The player controls the young Jedi apprentice Obi-Wan Kenobi, during the events of the film Star Wars Episode I: The Phantom Menace.

Obi-Wan (seen in the upper left corner) prepares an attack against enemy droids. A red laser beam coming from the weapon of an enemy bounces off his lightsaber.

There are a total of nine levels in Obi-Wan's Adventures that can be played with different difficulty settings. Obi-Wan is attacked by the Trade Federation's droids, bounty hunters, and various creatures during his travels, but can use his lightsaber and blaster to defeat them. Both close- and long-range combat are available in the battles with the Federation's forces. The player can also take advantage of Obi-Wan's connection to the Force as a weapon. In order to do this, the player must press the "A" button once to zoom in on the target, then again to blow the enemy away. The power of the Force is limited and eventually runs out. To power up, the player accumulates Force pellets that can be obtained in different levels. The Force is not only used as weapon, but also to progress through levels by moving objects that are in the way.

== Plot ==
The game begins with the Trade Federation's blockade of the planet Naboo. Jedi Master Qui-Gon Jinn and his apprentice Obi-Wan Kenobi are assigned by the Jedi Council as part of a mission to officiate the dispute and reach a settlement with the Federation leaders. When they reach the Federation's ship on Naboo, however, they find out that the Federation is not interested in negotiations and is secretly allied with the leader of the Sith, the Jedi Order's enemies; together, they plan to invade Naboo and take control of the galaxy by killing all Jedi. Obi-Wan and Qui-Gon are attacked by Federation droids, but manage to escape. They head to Theed, the capital of Naboo, to warn the unprepared inhabitants about the imminent attack.

During their journey to the city, the two Jedi cross Naboo's swamps and are assaulted by invading troops sent by the Federation. After delivering the warning, they travel to the planet Coruscant to talk with the Jedi Council. They are attacked by more Federation troops after arriving, but the two Jedi are able to defeat them. Jedi Grandmaster Yoda instructs Obi-Wan and Qui-Gon to return to Naboo and help Queen Amidala and her people defeat the Federation. Upon reaching Theed, the Jedi set out to liberate the city. To get around the Federation's droids, they manage to infiltrate the city by going through a secret entrance to the ancient catacombs, but are discovered and forced to battle the droids on their way through.

Obi-Wan and Qui-Gon discover that Amidala has been captured by the Federation and will soon have to sign a treaty handing control to them. Before heading to the Queen's palace to initiate an attack, they free captured citizens on the streets of Theed. The Jedi infiltrate the palace and manage to free the Queen, ruining the Federation's plans. Obi-Wan and Qui-Gon then encounter the Sith apprentice Darth Maul. Qui-Gon is mortally wounded in the battle, but Obi-Wan manages to kill Maul in retaliation. As a result, Obi-Wan's quest to become a Jedi Knight is completed.

== Development ==
In 2000, game publishers LucasArts and THQ announced an agreement that would allow THQ to turn LucasArts licenses into games for the Game Boy Color. THQ had previously published the Game Boy Color game Star Wars: Yoda Stories, and began work on their second Star Wars-licensed product, Obi-Wan's Adventures, thereafter as part of the agreement with LucasArts. It was originally a port of the then-upcoming game Star Wars: Obi-Wan, which was planned to be released for personal computers (PC) but was later canceled and moved for XBox as exclusive game. Obi-Wan's Adventures was first announced to the public in September 2000.

THQ hired the third-party Game Boy developer HotGen to develop the game, which they described as "the most authentic Star Wars adventure on the Game Boy Color system." Mark Fisher, director of product development at HotGen, commented on the game: "THQ has a solid hold on the Game Boy Color market, and we look forward to collaborating with them on Star Wars: Obi-Wan's Adventures. Millions of Star Wars fans will have the opportunity to interact with their favorite characters in a brand new Star Wars adventure just in time for the holidays." Obi-Wan's Adventures was released in North America on November 24, 2000, followed by Europe on December 8, 2000.

== Reception ==
Obi-Wan's Adventures

Aggregate score
Aggregator	Score
GameRankings	62.33%

Review scores
Publication	Score
IGN	5/10
Nintendo Power	3/5
Game Vortex	60%
The Sydney Morning Herald	3/5

The game has received mixed reviews from critics, with an aggregate score of 62.33% on GameRankings. Marc Nix of IGN gave it a 5/10 rating and commented that "murky visuals and slothful control destroy any hope of greatness in this game." The visuals were also criticized by an editor of 1UP.com, who stated that "you couldn't even see what the hell you were doing half the time in the game." Matt Paddock of Game Vortex commented that Obi Wan's Adventures "will be a must-buy for Star Wars freaks (and there's more than a few), but flawed control and lack of depth make for a generally average experience."

Kevin Cheung of The Sydney Morning Herald said the game "loses out badly in the graphics department", commenting that on the "tiny LCD screen the characters look like a garbled confusion of black pixels. It takes a healthy imagination to see the lasers bouncing off one's lightsabre. What's worse is that it's not always obvious where the exit passage is, which is frustrating after a slog through a tough level." In addition, Tim Wapshott of The Times said that "despite some rather good storyline screens, the graphics generally lack colour and the music is repetitive and tedious."

Nix praised the game's sound design, describing it as "far and away above what would be expected on the Game Boy Color." He noted, for example, that "there are individual sounds of the lightsaber swinging back and forth — cutting left will sound differently than the backswing or upswing of the third stroke against an enemy." Samantha Craggs of The Electric Playground praised Obi-Wan's Adventures for its interesting gameplay and the use of the lightsaber. She commented: "There are quite a few things to like about this game. For one thing, you can't underestimate the feeling of moving across the floor wielding a deadly lightsaber. Also, the levels are interesting. [...] In [one level], Obi-Wan is actually in a boat, going through the Naboo swamp, while battle droids shoot at him from the banks. While you're essentially fighting the same enemies in the same manner, there are enough twists in the level designs to interest you in continuing."
