= Star Wars: Jedi Arena =

1983 video game

- Developer: Parker Brothers
- Publisher: Parker Brothers
- Programmer: Rex Bradford
- Series: Star Wars
- Platform: Atari 2600
- Release: January 1983
- Genre: Action
- Modes: Single-player, multiplayer

Star Wars: Jedi Arena is a 1983 action video game programmed by Rex Bradford and published by Parker Brothers for the Atari 2600. Based on the Star Wars franchise, it is the first video game in the series to feature lightsabers; a type of energy sword that is prominently featured in its media. The gameplay is based around dueling against another player, who is either controlled by a human or artificial intelligence, to score points by using a “Seeker” ball to attack an opponent’s base while also defending hostile attacks with a lightsaber.

Following the adequate sales of their first Star Wars game, Star Wars: The Empire Strikes Back, Parker Brothers went on to continue developing Star Wars titles, starting with Jedi Arena, programmed by Rex Bradford. Although the game's reception was mixed at the time of release, with sound effects being praised and primarily the abstract combat being criticized, its legacy is largely negative, with several modern critics referring to the game as one of the worst Star Wars games of all time.

== Gameplay ==
Gameplay, including a remote and two lightsabers

In Star Wars: Jedi Arena, two Jedi Knights, one blue and one red, who are depicted from a top-down perspective, face each other during lightsaber training. Player one is blue; the red Jedi is either a human- or computer-controlled opponent. Players control their lightsabers with the paddle controller to defend themselves from the laser blasts coming from the Seeker ball, fired by the opponent. The Seeker will regularly turn wild and fire laser blasts randomly. The objective of the game is to fire laser blasts from the Seeker at the opponent's shield and finally directly at the opponent by aiming in the direction that the lightsaber is pointing. The game has four difficulty levels, changing the Seeker's speed; on the highest level, the Seeker is invisible. The game ends when one player has received three direct hits, and the winner becomes a Jedi Master.

== Development and release ==
Although Star Wars: The Empire Strikes Back was not a huge success, it sold well enough to encourage Parker Brothers to develop more Star Wars titles. In the December 11, 1982, issue of Billboard, it was reported that Parker Brothers was developing its second game cartridge. Titled Star Wars: Jedi Arena, the game was set for release the following month. During Jedi Arena's production, Parker Brothers relied upon an abstract approach to combat that took advantage of "the unique technologies and situations of the Star Wars universe". The game was programmed by Rex Bradford and inspired by one scene in Star Wars in which Luke Skywalker defends himself from the Seeker ball's incoming laser bolts with his lightsaber on board the Millennium Falcon. The game was released for the Atari 2600 as scheduled, in January 1983.

== Reception ==
Star Wars: Jedi Arena received mixed reviews from critics in the 1980s. Adam Thompson of Creative Computing Video & Arcade Games likened the mechanism of damaging the opponent's shield to smashing bricks in Breakout and praised the game's glowing multi-colored laser blasts and the sound effects, the latter of which he felt added realism to the game. According to Peter Brown of GameSpot, however, the main criticisms of the game were the stationary Jedi and abstract combat, the opposite of which action fans were expecting. Benj Edwards, writing for PCMag.com, claimed that Jedi Arena "may secretly be the best Star Wars video game ever made."

== Legacy ==
The legacy of Jedi Arena among modern critics is extremely negative. Ian Dransfield of Digital Spy ranked it as one of the 5 worst Star Wars games ever, noting that the game has not aged well. Lewis Packwood of Kotaku ranked the game second-to-worst, believing that the game should not have been based on one particular scene in Star Wars involving Luke Skywalker defending himself from a "floaty beach ball". In the book Classic Home Video Games, 1972–1984: A Complete Reference Guide, Brett Weiss criticized the game's controls, its overall "misguided" concept (given that the Jedi never actually engage in a duel), and the gameplay for "[relying] too much on luck". Several other sources described Jedi Arena to be either lamentable or one of the worst Star Wars games.

Matt Dorville of Blastr ranked the game No. 31 on the website's list of 50 Star Wars games ranked from worst to best, admitting that Jedi Arena was not bad at the time of release and that the game did offer an entertaining gameplay. In the book Guinness World Records 2017 Gamer's Edition, Jedi Arena is credited for being the first Star Wars video game to feature lightsaber action.
