= Star Wars: Return of the Jedi - Death Star Battle =

1983 video game

- ZX Spectrum cover art by John Berkey
- Developer: Parker Brothers
- Publishers: Parker Brothers; Sinclair Research (ZX Spectrum)
- Series: Star Wars
- Platforms: Atari 2600, Atari 5200, Atari 8-bit, ZX Spectrum
- Release: 2600: October 1983; 5200: February 1984; ZX Spectrum: EU: 1985
- Genre: Shoot 'em up
- Mode: Single-player

Star Wars: Return of the Jedi - Death Star Battle is a 1983 shoot 'em up video game developed and published by Parker Brothers for the Atari 2600, Atari 5200, and Atari 8-bit computers. In 1985, it was published by Sinclair Research as part of a software pack bundled with ZX Spectrum+. It was one of the earliest Star Wars-related video games, following Star Wars: The Empire Strikes Back in 1982 and alongside Atari's 1983 Star Wars arcade game. It was the first video game based on Return of the Jedi.

== Gameplay ==
ZX Spectrum screenshot

The player controls the Millennium Falcon with the aim of destroying the second Death Star. The game is split into two stages. In the first, the player must shoot enemy TIE fighters while waiting for an opportunity to pass through an energy shield.

In the second stage, the player must shoot at parts of the Death Star until there is a clear path to the reactor. Once the reactor has been destroyed, the player must avoid being hit by fireballs from the resultant explosion.

Once these objectives are completed, the game begins again in a new round with greater difficulty.

== Release ==
The cover art depicts the Millennium Falcon in flight away from the partially constructed Death Star, pursued by four TIE interceptors. It was produced by science fiction artist John Berkey, who designed some of the earliest poster art for the original 1977 film, Star Wars.

== See also ==
- Return of the Jedi, a 1984 arcade game from Atari
