= Laura Miele =

American businesswoman

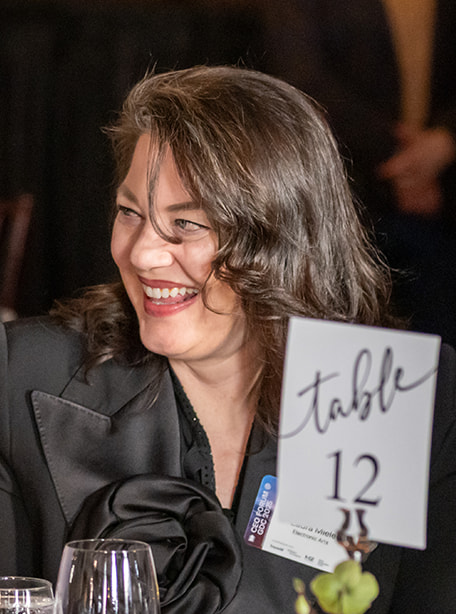
- Miele at a GDC 2025 event
- Born: San Francisco
- Education: University of Nevada at Las Vegas (dropped out)
- Employer: Electronic Arts
- Title: President

Laura Miele (born June 9, 1969) is an American businesswoman who is part of Electronic Arts as President of its Enterprise Development division.

== Personal life ==
Miele was born in San Francisco and grew up in a residential area near Lake Tahoe. She got her start in games through an affinity for board games with family. Miele attended University of Nevada at Las Vegas but did not graduate.

While studying at the University of Nevada at Las Vegas, Miele simultaneously worked at architectural companies. Miele now lives in the Bay Area.

== Career ==
In 1996, Laura Miele joined video game developer Westwood Studios as a project manager and then become the head of marketing for its parent company, Virgin Interactive, and when EA acquired Westwood in 1998, she stayed on to focus on developing advanced analytics for revenue forecasting.

Laura Miele hired a data analyst team known as "the Jedi," and directed them to build Electronic Arts' first statistical regression models to study "sales trends, seasonality, and preorders". It took about two years to put the system in place.

Miele has held a variety of leadership roles during her tenure at Electronic Arts. As Chief Studios Officer, Miele has managed 6,000 staffers and thousands of contractors, in addition to overseeing EA's 25 studios. Laura Miele became known for incorporating the gaming community's feedback in her decisions on what games should be made, such as those related to skateboarding.

Prior to that, Miele was executive vice president of global publishing, senior vice president of publishing, and when EA signed a ten-year deal with The Walt Disney Company in 2013, Miele became Star Wars general manager. She also was senior vice president of global marketing and vice president of strategic planning.

Miele started a women's networking and mentorship group at Electronic Arts. Being interested in women's rights, she works for the representation of women in games. Miele was on the board of the Silicon Valley Community Foundation and also leads the EA Women's Ultimate Team.

In April 2022 Miele was appointed to the British Film Institute's board of governors for a four-year term.

In 2023, Miele became President of EA Entertainment, Technology & Central Development, where she oversaw Electronic Arts' studios other than those responsible for its sports titles.

In June 2026, Miele was promoted to President, Enterprise Development, partnering with CEO Andrew Wilson to pursue strategic growth opportunities beyond EA's core business.
