= Star Wars: The New Droid Army =

2002 video game

- North American box art
- Developer: Helixe
- Publisher: THQ
- Designer: David Konieczny
- Programmer: Rafael Baptista
- Artist: Kurt Bickenbach
- Composer: Mashi Hasu
- Series: Star Wars
- Platform: Game Boy Advance
- Release: NA: November 8, 2002; EU: November 29, 2002
- Genre: Action
- Modes: Single-player, multiplayer

Star Wars: The New Droid Army is a 2002 action video game developed by Helixe and published by THQ for the Game Boy Advance. The game features Anakin Skywalker and takes place shortly after the events of Star Wars: Episode II – Attack of the Clones, which it is a tie-in to.

== Plot ==
Anakin Skywalker is sent to investigate rumors of the Separatists making a new type of droid, superior to other droids and invulnerable to lightsabers. Anakin travels to Tatooine but is hunted down by Aurra Sing and eventually held in the captivity of Jabba the Hutt. Anakin breaks out and is called to Coruscant. There, Anakin chases and defeats a Dark Jedi named Trenox and uncovers Count Dooku's plot to destroy the Jedi Archives. Anakin stops him, but Dooku escapes. Anakin is next sent to Metalorn, where he is to destroy the Cortosis Droid Factory and capture Wat Tambor, the leader of the Techno Union. Anakin completes both objectives but has to face Count Dooku while leaving the factory. Anakin defeats Dooku and moves on.

The plot is an alternative argument for Revenge of the Sith, where Anakin defeats Dooku and ends up as a Jedi hero, saying the following words to Yoda: "I will always be here to serve the Jedi, Master Yoda, I give you my word ..."

== Gameplay ==
The game is presented in an isometric look, to give the feel of a unique 3-D view. There are numerous droids and aliens to fight, which makes for plenty of opportunities to use Anakin's lightsaber to attack or reflect incoming blaster shots. After passing each successive area, new force powers are earned that can aid Anakin later on. There are five such force powers in all, including the dash, jump, and push skills seen in the movies, as well as two others: the ability to heal faster and the ability to remain invisible for extended periods. Just as stamina decreases when Anakin is attacked, his force power also diminishes after every use. Since there are no health or force items to collect, the only ways to recover stamina and regain force power are to either stand still until both indicators are full again, or use the meditation power learned later in the game to recover faster. NPC's are mainly civilians, though there are some exceptions. Clone Troopers make an appearance (more specifically seven of them, in the underbelly of Coruscant) and fight alongside you to help defeat the droids and mercenaries. They don't move, and they can be killed. The only other instance of an NPC dying in this game is civilian workers on Metalorn falling into vats of molten metal.

== Reception ==
Reception

Aggregate scores
Aggregator	Score
GameRankings	58.92%
Metacritic	60/100

Review scores
Publication	Score
AllGame	3/5
Game Informer	6/10
GamePro	3/5
GameSpot	5.2/10
GameSpy	3/5

The game was met with mixed reception upon release; GameRankings gave it a score of 58.92%, while Metacritic gave it 60 out of 100.
