= Star Wars: Return of the Jedi (video game) =

1984 video game

- North American arcade flyer
- Developer: Atari, Inc.
- Publishers: Atari, Inc. Conversions; Domark
- Designer: Dennis Harper
- Programmer: Dennis Harper
- Artist: Susan G. McBride
- Composer: Synthia Petroka
- Series: Star Wars
- Platforms: Arcade, Amiga, Amstrad CPC, Atari ST, Commodore 64, BBC Micro, ZX Spectrum
- Release: Arcade: NA: September 1984; Amiga, CPC, C64, ZX Spectrum: UK: 1988
- Genre: Scrolling shooter
- Mode: Single-player

Star Wars: Return of the Jedi is a 1984 scrolling shooter video game developed and published by Atari, Inc. for arcades. It is based on the 1983 film Return of the Jedi, and is Atari's second Star Wars arcade game. As the flagship for Atari's new graphics chips, it uses antialiased raster graphics (pixels) rather than the vector graphics of the preceding Star Wars (1983) and the later The Empire Strikes Back (1985) arcade games.

From 1988 to 1990, Domark released several home computer conversions for the Amstrad CPC, BBC Micro, ZX Spectrum, Atari ST, Commodore 64, and Amiga. Over the decades, the arcade game has been re-released several times as an unlockable extra within more modern games, or as a replica arcade cabinet.

== Gameplay ==
The arcade attract mode shows the first stage.

Return of the Jedi is presented from an isometric 3/4 perspective. Players control vehicles using a flight yoke controller with trigger fire buttons, similar to the preceding Star Wars arcade game. The game is divided into multiple stages based on sequences from the film.

In the first stage, Princess Leia pilots a speeder bike through the forests of Endor. The player must navigate between trees, evade enemies, and shoot scout troopers or lure them into traps set by Ewoks. The second stage pilots the Millennium Falcon approaching the Death Star II space station, to shoot and navigate through an energy shield opening. This is followed by another speeder bike stage. In later stages, Chewbacca commandeers an AT-ST walker, dodging log traps and battling enemy walkers. The perspective sometimes switches mid-stage to the Millennium Falcon battling TIE fighters. The final sequence flies the Millennium Falcon inside the Death Star to navigate tunnels, destroy TIE fighters and laser turrets, reach the reactor core, and escape the ensuing explosion.

After destroying the Death Star, the game loops, restarting at the first stage with increased difficulty.

== Development ==
Atari had designed new arcade hardware and wanted to showcase it in Return of the Jedi. It is a significant technological departure from Atari's previous Star Wars arcade games by using raster graphics instead of vector graphics. A key technical feature is its early use of anti-aliasing to smooth the appearance of diagonal lines inherent in raster displays. It enables artists to leverage small data storage into an "enormous" amount of playfield graphics. A new Atari chip for dithering further enhances graphical smoothness. The system has two MOS 6502 microprocessors (one at 2.5 MHz, one at 1.512 MHz), four POKEY sound chips (at 1.512 MHz), and a Texas Instruments TMS5220 speech synthesis chip (at 672 kHz). The isometric perspective was heavily influenced by the popularity of Sega's Zaxxon. The distinctive flight yoke controller from the 1983 Star Wars game was reused for Return of the Jedi. The game was developed and published by Atari, Inc. on Atari arcade hardware.

Lead designer and "chief technical guy" Lyle Rains assigned the project to programmer Dennis Harper. They "wanted it to have rich, colorful backgrounds and a deep kind of gameplay". Harper was inspired by the preceding Star Wars arcade game and recreated elements like the Death Star trench run. The goal was to stay true to the film's great variety and its action sequences, so he flipped between dual settings. The team considered including a sequence where the player shoots the shield generator on Endor, but the scene transition was too abrupt.

== Release ==
The arcade game was released in 1984, a period of intense industry-wide difficulty following the video game crash of 1983.

In 1988, Domark published conversions of the arcade game for various home computers. The game was released for the Amiga, Amstrad CPC, Commodore 64, and ZX Spectrum. In 1990, Domark published Power Box for Atari ST and Amiga, which is a compilation of Tengen's conversions of the trilogy of Star Wars arcade games.

== Reception ==
Reception

Review scores
Publication	Score
Computer and Video Games	CPC: 79% Spec: 72%
ACE	
Amiga Computing	Amiga: 63%
Amstrad Action	CPC: 82%
Atari ST User	ST: 90%
Crash	Spec: 86%
Commodore User	Amiga: 78%
ST/Amiga Format	ST: 72%
The Games Machine	Amiga: 89% ST: 77% CPC: 75% C64: 73% Spec: 71%
The One	ST/Amiga: 66%
Your Sinclair	Spec: 81%, 70%
Zzap!64	C64: 82%

=== Arcade ===
Critics have compared the isometric viewpoint and scrolling action to Sega's 1982 arcade hit Zaxxon.

In Japan, Game Machine listed Star Wars: Return of the Jedi as the sixth most successful upright/cockpit arcade unit of February 1985. However, the game did not achieve the same level of commercial success as the original Star Wars (1983) arcade game, of which more than 10,000 cabinets were sold. Retrospective reviews often consider it less impactful than Atari's vector-based Star Wars games. IGN's "History of Star Wars Games" described it as an "anemic re-creation" of the film's final battle.

=== Home computers ===
The many home computer conversions released by Domark in 1988 received generally positive reviews across many platforms.

ACE magazine initially praised the Atari ST version for its "terrific" gameplay with frantic action and good sound and graphics, rating it 854/1000 (85%) and saying the diagonal scrolling was good for the ST. However, a later update in March 1989 revised the score down to 678/1000 (67.8%). ACE gave the Commodore 64 version an 85% score, and the Amstrad CPC version 82%.

Reviews for the ZX Spectrum version varied. Crash gave it 86%, and listed it under "Honourable Mentions" in February 1989. Your Sinclair scored it 81% and 70% in different listings.

For the Amiga version, Commodore User scored it 78%, and Amiga Computing gave it 63%. The One gave the Amiga and ST versions a combined score of 66%. Amiga User International rated Amiga at 5/10. The Games Machine scored the Amiga version a high 89%, and the ST version at 77%, CPC at 75%, Commodore 64 at 73%, and Spectrum at 71%. Additional ST scores include ST Action (78%), Génération 4 (79%), Joystick (75%), Player One (75%), MicroNews (4/5), Computer Entertainer (6/8), and Tilt (15/20). Power Play scored the Atari ST version 67% and the Amiga version 68%.

== Legacy ==
Star Wars: Return of the Jedi has been viewed as the least memorable of Atari's original Star Wars arcade trilogy, overshadowed by the groundbreaking vector graphics and gameplay of the 1983 original Star Wars and its 1985 Empire Strikes Back conversion kit. Its primary technical contributions are its shift to raster graphics within the series and its pioneering use of anti-aliasing in an arcade game. In rankings of Star Wars arcade games, it typically places below the other two Atari games.

Atari's three 1980s Star Wars arcade games are unlockable bonuses for emulation within Star Wars Rogue Squadron III: Rebel Strike, released 2005 for GameCube.

The original arcade cabinet became a collector's item and auctions have reached about US$4,000 for working units. Modern replica arcade cabinets, such as those produced by Arcade1Up, bundle the Atari arcade trilogy.

== See also ==
- Return of the Jedi: Death Star Battle, a 1983 home computer video game by Parker Brothers
