= Star Wars Trilogy: Apprentice of the Force =

2004 video game

- North American box art
- Developer: Ubisoft Montreal
- Publisher: Ubisoft
- Producer: Jean-François Mailloux
- Designer: Annick Dumais
- Programmer: Rachel Potvin
- Writers: Eva Bunodiere; Philippe Morin
- Composers: Jocelyn Daoust; Clint Bajakian
- Series: Star Wars
- Platform: Game Boy Advance
- Release: NA: September 21, 2004; AU: September 23, 2004; EU: September 24, 2004
- Genre: Action-platform
- Mode: Single-player

Star Wars Trilogy: Apprentice of the Force is an action-platform game developed and published by Ubisoft. Released in September 2004 for Game Boy Advance, the game follows Luke Skywalker through the Star Wars original trilogy.

== Gameplay ==
Much of Apprentice of the Force's gameplay takes place in a side-scrolling, platforming based environment. As Luke Skywalker, the player originally only has access to basic jumps and blaster-based combat, but as Luke learns more of the Force and the way of the Jedi, he gains the ability to wield a lightsaber to fight in melee combat, and deflect projectiles. In addition to the basic platforming, there are also minor puzzles to solve to progress. Occasionally, Luke will have to protect an NPC, such as R2-D2 or Princess Leia to progress. There are also still several stages where Luke takes control of a ship in vehicle based combat where he must avoid oncoming obstacles whilst defeating foes. There are also several boss fights throughout the game, such as against Boba Fett or Darth Vader.

The gameplay has been compared to the Game Boy Advance version of Prince of Persia: The Sands of Time in that the same side-scrolling engine is used, and that the player can slow down time temporarily with "Force Blitz". A player who beats the game is given the option of replaying most of the ship and boss levels, as well as playing a arcade survival arena mode where they must defeat as many enemies as possible before being defeated themselves.

== Plot ==
The player controls Luke Skywalker throughout the entire original trilogy of the Star Wars saga, beginning from his time on Tatooine in A New Hope, all the way to his eventual destiny as a Jedi Master in Return of the Jedi.

== Development ==
Apprentice of the Force uses the engine of the GBA version of Prince of Persia: The Sands of Time, instrumental to the implementation of the mid-game "Force Blitz" ability.

== Reception ==
Reception

Aggregate scores
| Aggregator | Score |
|---|---|
| GameRankings | 65.32% |
| Metacritic | 60/100 |

Review scores
| Publication | Score |
|---|---|
| Electronic Gaming Monthly | 3/10 |
| Game Informer | 6/10 |
| GameSpot | 6.4/10 |
| GameSpy | 3/5 |
| GameZone | 7/10 |
| IGN | 6.5/10 |
| NGC Magazine | 61% |
| Nintendo Power | 3/5 |
| Nintendo World Report | 6/10 |

The game was met with average to mixed reception upon release; review aggregation website GameRankings gave it an average score of 65.32%, whilst fellow site Metacritic gave it an average score of 60 out of 100.

GameSpot, giving the game a 6.4/10, were mixed on the game, complimenting its audio and visuals, whilst bemoaning its repetitive combat and short length, stating that whilst there were some "choice moments" in the game, "they don't come up as often as they should in this short action game."
