= Star Wars: Bounty Hunter =

2002 video game

- Promotional North American PS2 cover art
- Developer: LucasArts (Note: Remaster developed by Aspyr)
- Publisher: LucasArts (Note: Remaster published by Aspyr)
- Director: Jon Knoles
- Producer: Joe Brisbois
- Designer: Jon Knoles
- Programmer: Priamos Georgiades
- Artist: Ian Milham
- Writer: Haden Blackman
- Composer: Jeremy Soule
- Series: Star Wars
- Platforms: PlayStation 2 GameCube; Nintendo Switch; PlayStation 4 PlayStation 5 Windows; Xbox One; Xbox Series X/S
- Release: PlayStation 2: NA: November 22, 2002; PAL: December 6, 2002; GameCube: NA: December 5, 2002; PAL: February 7, 2003; Switch, PS4, PS5, Windows, Xbox One, Xbox Series X/S: WW: August 1, 2024
- Genre: Action-adventure
- Mode: Single-player

Star Wars: Bounty Hunter is a 2002 action-adventure game developed and published by LucasArts for the PlayStation 2 and GameCube. The PlayStation 2 version was later re-released as a PlayStation 2 Classics title on the PlayStation 3 in April 2015, and on the PlayStation 4 in January 2016. The PlayStation 4 version had a limited physical run distributed by Limited Run Games in June 2019. An enhanced version developed and published by Aspyr was released for the Nintendo Switch, PlayStation 4, PlayStation 5, Windows, Xbox One, and Xbox Series X/S in August 2024.

Bounty Hunter is a prequel to the 2002 film Star Wars: Episode II – Attack of the Clones, and a continuation of the comic book Jango Fett: Open Seasons by Haden Blackman and Ramón F. Bachs. Set in the Star Wars Legends expanded universe, the game follows former Mandalorian warrior Jango Fett during his prime as a bounty hunter and provides the backstory to the character's role in Attack of the Clones. It explains several elements from the film, such as how he acquired his iconic ship, Slave I, met his future partner Zam Wesell, and was chosen as the genetic template for the clone troopers of the Grand Army of the Republic. In the game's overarching narrative, Fett is hired by Darth Tyranus, a Sith Lord, to eliminate the Dark Jedi Komari Vosa. Fett becomes entangled in an extensive "death stick" trafficking conspiracy while clashing with various criminal syndicates and an old rival.

== Gameplay ==
Bounty Hunter allows players to target an enemy and then move without losing target lock. This allows for maneuvers such as circle strafing.

Star Wars: Bounty Hunter is an action-adventure game played from a third-person perspective. Players control Jango Fett, who has access to a wide array of weapons in the game, including his trademark blaster pistols, a flamethrower, poison darts, and jetpack-mounted missiles. They can use Jango's jetpack to fly and reach areas that are otherwise inaccessible, but it quickly runs out of fuel, which recharges automatically when the jetpack is not used; using the flamethrower also burns the jetpack's fuel. Additionally, Jango can use the scanner built into his helmet to identify individuals and see if they have a bounty on their head. He can then capture the individuals in question either dead, or alive, by immobilizing them with his whipcord thrower. When using the scanner, the game switches to a first-person perspective.

In-game, Jango can make use of his acrobatic abilities, somersaulting, and jumping to the side to backflipping to avoid enemies. He automatically targets enemies, and holding a certain button allows Jango to move around an enemy while keeping them targeted. If the player is using Jango's blaster pistols, up to two enemies can be targeted at the same time. There are also many pickups, powerups, and items to help along the way.

Completing levels and capturing bounty targets rewards the player with credits, which can be used to unlock concept art. Each level has a secret feather, which unlock cards from the Star Wars Trading Card Game by Wizards of the Coast; if all feathers are found, bonus footage is unlocked. After every level, pages of the comic Open Seasons are unlocked for viewing, and after completing chapters, "blooper reels" for the cutscenes in that chapter are unlocked.

== Plot ==
Shortly after the Battle of Naboo, and ten years prior to the outbreak of the Clone Wars, the Sith Lord Darth Sidious orders his apprentice, Darth Tyranus, to eliminate his former pupil-turned-Dark Jedi Komari Vosa before she becomes a threat to Sidious' future plans. Vosa has become the leader of a crime syndicate called the Bando Gora, which grew immensely powerful through its trafficking of addictive "death sticks". Elsewhere, bounty hunter Jango Fett captures gangster Meeko Ghintee following a long pursuit through the Outland Station. After collecting the bounty on Meeko's head, Jango returns to his Toydarian friend Rozatta and is contracted by Tyranus with killing Vosa for 5,000,000 Republic credits.

Jango investigates the Bando Gora's death strick trafficking ring in the hopes of tracking down Vosa. On Coruscant, he captures and interrogates death stick dealer Jervis Gloom, who reveals his source to be a gangster named Groff Haugg. While investigating Haugg's processing plant, Jango runs into his longtime rival, Montross, who is also hunting Vosa and has killed Haugg via carbonite freezing after interrogating him for Vosa's whereabouts. Following a brief fight, Montross leaves to find Vosa, while Jango infiltrates the penthouse of Twi'lek Senator Connus Trell, who is also involved in the trafficking ring. Trell tells Jango to seek the Dug crime lord Sebolto on Malastare before being thrown to his death.

After escaping from a Republic gunship, Jango learns that Sebolto has put a 50,000 credits bounty on the head of his former employee Bendix Fust, who is incarcerated at the asteroid prison Oovo IV. Believing that capturing Fust will allow him to get close to Sebolto, Jango infiltrates the prison but finds that another bounty hunter, Zam Wesell, has beaten him to Fust. The two are forced to work together to escape from Oovo IV with Fust, and stage a riot to create a distraction. After Jango's beloved ship, Jaster's Legacy, is destroyed, he, Wesell, and Fust escape in another vessel, which Jango dubs Slave I. Meanwhile, Montross finds that Haugg gave him a false lead, but hears of the Oovo IV riot and, realizing it was Jango's doing, decides to follow him.

Jango delivers Fust to Sebolto on Malastare, but the crime lord quickly deduces Jango's true intentions and attempts to flee, only to fall to his death down a pipe leading into his death stick factory. Jango enters the factory and finds some Bando Gora members guarding a ship with Huttese markings on it, hinting at the Hutts' involvement in the death stick distribution ring. Montross ambushes Jango again, taunting him over his adoptive father's, Jaster Mereel, death and the disastrous Battle of Galidraan, where Jango's Mandalorian forces were slain by a Jedi ambush. Jango is defeated, but escapes with Wesell's help.

On Tatooine, while Wesell goes to question Gardulla the Hutt, Jango kills gang leader Longo Two-Guns to gain an audience with Jabba. After Jabba reveals Gardulla's involvement with the Bando Gora, Jango travels to her castle but is captured when an imprisoned Wesell, whom he left in her cell to avoid sounding the alarm, compromises his position. He escapes, confronts Gardulla, and feeds her to her pet Krayt dragon, which he then kills. Leaving Wesell behind, Jango continues his search for Vosa alone, only for Montross to attack Rozatta's station in an attempt to hinder him. Jango arrives to find a dying Rozatta, who gives him a guidance device to help him track Vosa and asks him to find something to live for besides money.

Jango journeys to Bogden's moon Kohlma, the Bando Gora's secret headquarters, where he finds Montross waiting for him in front of Vosa's citadel. Jango defeats Montross and leaves him to be killed by the Bando Gora, refusing to give him a warrior's death. As he enters the citadel, Jango is captured and tortured by Vosa, until Wesell suddenly arrives to rescue him, getting herself injured in the process. After finally defeating Vosa, Darth Tyranus arrives and chokes her to death, before explaining to a stunned Jango that the bounty was merely a test to find someone worthy of becoming the genetic template for a clone army, and that Jango passed it. The bounty hunter agrees to be cloned but, in addition to his monetary reward, demands that he get to keep one unmodified clone for himself (thus honoring Rozatta's final wish). The game ends with Jango carrying the wounded Wesell to Slave I while telling her not to push her luck when she suggests splitting the reward 50/50.

== Development and release ==
Development of Star Wars: Bounty Hunter began when LucasArts was asked to make an Episode II-based game which featured the character Jango Fett. In March 2001, game design documents were presented, and development began shortly after. The PlayStation 2 and GameCube versions of the game have different custom in-house graphics engines, each designed specifically to take advantage of the two platforms' unique strengths and work around their unique limitations, but the core game engine is identical. In the PS2 version, the developers took advantage of both vector unit (VU) chips to drive the graphics to maximum performance. The DMA bandwidth was taken advantage of to use a high number of textures. There is full-screen antialiasing and texture mip mapping support. The second VU1 chip was used to handle all the character skinning and VU0 to handle all the skeletal animation transforms. Which enabled dozens of characters to be on-screen without bogging down the frame rate. 10 individually optimized rendering loops were used on VU1 to speed up the rendering process. Their PS2 graphics engine could move 10,000,000 triangles per second, and adding the gameplay, collision, logic, textures, sound would go down accordingly to around 30,000 to 50,000 triangles per frame, all at an average frame rate of 30 frames per second.

In the GameCube version, developers took advantage of the system's fast CPU to achieve a higher frame rate, and added more polygons to characters, especially Jango, who has roughly twice the polygon count on GameCube. The GameCube's texture compression allowed them to use high-resolution textures. Texture compression also allowed for improved color variance on textures. MIP mapping support across the board on all textures helped provide a rich and consistent environment. Additional memory was exploited to improve load times. Projected shadows were implemented on all the characters and an increased draw distance to allow for vista views.

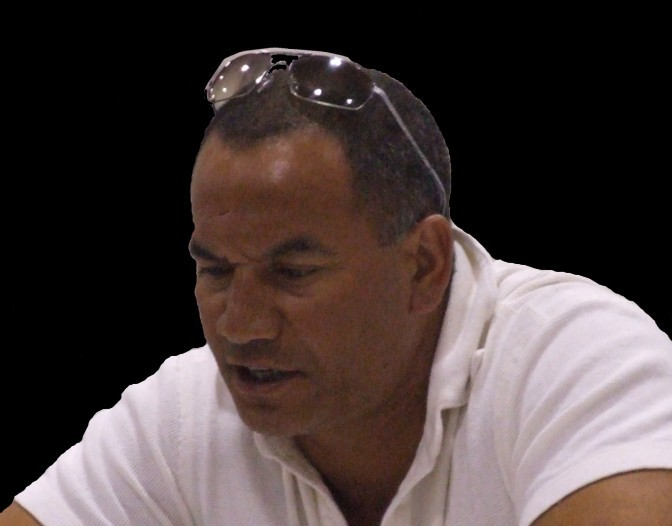
Temuera Morrison reprises his role as Jango Fett in Bounty Hunter.

Level design began with what designer Michael Stuart Licht referred to as spatial studies. Design began with paper cut-outs of various rooms. Licht would rearrange these rooms until he found a design that he felt worked. The papers had design ideas written on them so that other developers could understand the overall flow of each level. Bubble diagrams were then created which represented main ideas for each space. This was followed by various stages of overview drawings and other drawing studies. The 3D level design began after such studies were completed. In-game cinematics were created by Industrial Light & Magic (ILM), and marked the first collaboration between LucasArts and ILM. Composer Jeremy Soule wrote music for the game, including both cutscenes and gameplay. The characters Jango Fett and Komari Vosa have their own leitmotifs. Both Temuera Morrison and Leeanna Walsman reprise their roles from Attack of the Clones as Jango Fett and Zam Wesell, respectively.

Production began in November 2000 when LucasArts was asked to make a game based on Star Wars: Episode II – Attack of the Clones featuring Jango Fett. The game design proposal was presented in March 2001, and development started soon after. Jon Knoles revealed in an interview that they wanted to develop Jango into the ideal action-based video game character and that he was to be exciting to watch and fun to play. Secondly, LucasArts wanted to develop a story that fleshed out Fett's character more fully than in Attack of the Clones, while at the same time remaining true to the spirit of his character as seen in the film. It was imperative to not dull the game with a slow story and leaden script; as such, their goal was to work a fine balance between backstory, narrative, and action-packed gameplay. Knoles said Jango Fett was developed to be an extension of the player's will, the ideal vessel through which the player could live out the fantasy of being the galaxy's most dangerous bounty hunter. His movement and animation blending system was designed to automatically react to other world objects and to never be unable to use his weapons or devices in any situation. The jetpack was originally designed to be used in areas specifically designed for its use. When the team got it working, they changed their minds and implemented a rechargeable timer on it so the player could use it anywhere for a limited time. At the most, the crew was over fifty people that were working on the game, excluding Industrial Light & Magic (ILM).

Concept artists looked to the team's favorite graphic novels for inspiration and the concept artwork by Ralph McQuarrie, Doug Chiang, Joe Johnston, and others who worked on the Star Wars films. The developers were given access to the Episode II script and concept art early on before the film came out. LucasArts created storyboarded scripts of their cutscenes and gave them to ILM, who developed them into cinematic cutscenes. Knoles envisioned the level layouts and then consulted with lead level designer David Wehr and his level designers. A bubble map of the levels was created from which they worked to determine details in what the player would face and be able to do. The team made a new engine for the game to be able to do what they wanted. The graphic designers worked concurrently with the level designers to create the environments, which the level designers then used to better visualize what they were trying to do. Knoles had previously been involved in the development of the Super Star Wars trilogy for the Super NES and often referred to those games when describing certain aspects of Star Wars: Bounty Hunter to the team.

Industrial Light & Magic and Skywalker Sound assisted in the creation of the game, which was the first collaboration between LucasArts and ILM in the field of in-game cinematics. Knoles said LucasArts and ILM learned a great deal from their cooperation, which allowed ILM to try new methods for creating scenes, as well as new tools and techniques. LucasArts provided ILM with models, textures, and a storyboarded script, and then applied their cinematic expertise in adapting the script into dynamic and visually stunning films. The sound designers of LucasArts and the sound designers at Skywalker Sound worked together to create the game soundtrack. Skywalker Sound made sounds directly for game animations and events, and created foley sounds.

The game was released in 2002 for PlayStation 2 in North America on November 22, and in Europe on December 6. It was released for the GameCube in North America on December 5, and in Europe the following year on February 7.

In June 2024, Lucasfilm Games announced a remaster of Star Wars: Bounty Hunter developed by Aspyr, set for release on Nintendo Switch, PlayStation 4, PlayStation 5, Windows, Xbox One and Xbox Series X/S on August 1, 2024. The remastered version boasts improved environmental texture quality, lighting effects and the addition of a flashlight for navigating the darker areas of the game, as well as the ability to start a new playthrough as Boba Fett upon reaching a 100% completion save file in reference to an Easter egg that didn't materialize in the original game. The PS5 version also implements several DualSense controller features such as utilizing the adaptive triggers for additional impact on Jango's weapons, mapping his radio communication to the integrated speaker on the controller, and using the lightbar embedded within the touchpad for visually indicating health status.

== Reception ==
Reception

Aggregate score
Aggregator	Score
Metacritic	(GC) 67/100 (PS2) 65/100

Review scores
Publication	Score
GameSpot	(GC) 6.5/10 (PS2) 5.4/10
IGN	(GC) 8.3/10 (PS2) 8.2/10
Official U.S. PlayStation Magazine	3/5

Bounty Hunter received mixed reviews on Metacritic. PlayStation Official Magazine complimented the core shooting and production values but criticized its repetitive nature. IGN praised the graphics, sound, length and level designs, but they criticized the implementation of the bounty hunting system. In the end, however, they found the game to be one of the better Star Wars tie-in games. GameSpot was less impressed. They found the technical issues of the game to be too significant, including issues with the camera, clipping, and collision detection. They also criticized the graphics and the overall gameplay, concluding that it has "all the basic ingredients needed" but "falls flat in the execution".
