= Star Wars: Obi-Wan =

2001 video game

- North American box art
- Developer: LucasArts
- Publisher: LucasArts
- Director: Dan Connors
- Producers: Michael Gallo; Bryan Davis
- Designer: Christopher Ross
- Programmer: Kevin Bruner
- Artist: Ian Milham
- Composer: Mark Griskey
- Series: Star Wars
- Platform: Xbox
- Release: NA: December 19, 2001; EU: March 29, 2002
- Genre: Action-adventure
- Modes: Single-player, multiplayer

Star Wars: Obi-Wan, originally titled Star Wars: Episode I: Obi-Wan, is a 2001 action-adventure video game developed and published by LucasArts and released exclusively for Xbox on December 19, 2001 in North America and March 29, 2002 in Europe. It is set in the Legends canonicity of the Star Wars universe. Players control the Jedi Obi-Wan Kenobi around 32 years before the Battle of Yavin, shortly prior to and during the events of the 1999 film The Phantom Menace. The game received generally mixed reviews upon its release.

== Gameplay ==
Obi-Wan takes on the Training Droid

In Star Wars: Obi-Wan, the player controls Obi-Wan Kenobi during a sequence of events prior to and leading up to The Phantom Menace. The game is unique in that lightsaber combat is controlled using the right analog stick of the Xbox controller. By moving the stick in specific motions Kenobi will swing his lightsaber in a related motion. The character has a variety of Force powers at his disposal. One power provides a version of bullet time, slowing the area around the character, effectively allowing players to attack slowed-down enemies, or evade to cover. Other powers allow him to jump higher, move objects, and disarm enemies. Kenobi will perform a 180-degree turn with the press of a button, allowing the player to instantly spin and attack enemies behind them. Aside from the lightsaber, weapons such as blasters, ion grenades, and turrets can be utilized against enemies. The game supports a multiplayer mode called Jedi Battle, which allows two players to battle each other as any one of the Jedi characters unlocked. Characters may be unlocked by defeating them in the single-player Jedi arena, which becomes available between missions.

== Plot ==
Star Wars: Obi-Wan is a retelling of the events of The Phantom Menace, beginning with Obi-Wan surviving an attempt on his life by a criminal outfit called the Black Heth on Coruscant. He reports this to the Jedi Council, who informs him that the Black Heth have been growing in strength and that an informant planted by the city guard has been exposed and taken to the gang's hideout. Mace Windu tasks Obi-Wan with rescuing him; the informant reveals that arms dealers are selling large quantities of weapons to the Black Heth to destabilize Coruscant.

Obi-Wan tries and fails to intercept the dealers as they evacuate the planet; the Council determines they are a tribal species called Jin'ha. As the Jin'ha is too primitive a race to manufacture such deadly arms themselves, Jedi Masters Plo Koon and Eeth Koth are sent on a mission to their homeworld, Obredaan, to investigate. The ship transporting them disappears, and Obi-Wan, accompanied by Qui-Gon, is ordered to complete the mission instead. While Qui-Gon locates the two captured Jedi, Obi-Wan discovers a vast mining and refinery complex beneath Obredaan built to process cortosis. This lightsaber-resistant mineral could be used to craft weapons ideal for combatting Jedi. As the group leaves, they spot a ship from the Trade Federation leaving Obredaan.

When representatives from the Federation deny any knowledge of the Jin'ha's activities, Qui-Gon and Obi-Wan are given an official assignment to meet with Federation Viceroy Nute Gunray and inspect his facilities. Upon boarding the Viceroy's ship, the Jedi are placed in a conference room that slowly fills with poisonous gas as a squad of Federation droids arrive with orders to kill them. The pair escape and attempt to storm the ship's bridge, but are forced to retreat in the face of superior firepower. Instead, Qui-Gon instructs his apprentice to sabotage the ship's communications array and disable its engines, cutting the ship off from the rest of the Federation fleet and forcing it to land on the nearest planet, Naboo. Upon landing, they discover that the Federation has launched a full-scale invasion.

Qui-Gon meets Jar Jar Binks, who takes them to his people, the Gungans. The Gungans refuse to assist but allow the Jedi to take one of their ships to Naboo's capital, Theed. With Qui-Gon providing a distraction, Obi-Wan fights his way through the invasion forces and accesses the royal palace through the kitchen; a handmaiden named Asha helps him bypass the palace's security system and meet up with Royal Guard leader Captain Panaka. Unfortunately, by the time they reach the throne room, Queen Amidala has been captured by the Federation, who intend for her to sign a treaty legitimizing their invasion.

Qui-Gon and Obi-Wan ambush the Queen's droid escorts and escape Naboo. While on Tatooine looking for spare parts to fix their damaged ship, a party of Tusken Raiders abducts Amidala. Obi-Wan pursues them to a large village and defeats the Raider war chief in hand-to-hand combat. The Raiders submit and allow him to leave with the Queen.

On Coruscant, the Council, against Qui-Gon's wishes, order him and Obi-Wan to return to Theed and protect Amidala until they can identify a Sith warrior who attacked them on Tatooine. Obi-Wan meets with Asha, who has assumed command of the planet's resistance forces, and asks him to liberate a group of pilots being held in a makeshift prison so they can go after the Federation's command ship. Obi-Wan does so, destroying the anti-aircraft cannon the Federation had placed to intercept the pilots.

While the attack commences, the Jedi help the resistance fight off an attempt to recapture the hangar. The Sith arrives, revealing himself as Darth Maul, and Qui-Gon battles him until he is struck down. Obi-Wan steps in and defeats Maul, avenging his master. As the Federation surrenders to Amidala, Obi-Wan swears to honor Qui-Gon's dying wish by training a young boy he found on Tatooine as a Jedi.

== Development ==
The game "Episode I: Obi-Wan" was announced on May 13, 1999, intended for a PC release. PC Gamer rumored it as a "sequel" to Star Wars Jedi Knight: Dark Forces II, emphasizing mouse control of the Jedi lightsaber. However, in November 2000 it was shifted to exclusive Xbox development by George Lucas himself, due to lack of performance on the PC platform. The game resurfaced in May 2001 exclusively on the Xbox just prior to that year's E3. Plans for objective-based multiplayer modes and online play were also canceled. Developers spoke with key figures involved with The Phantom Menace and crafted each level and story arc to fit within the boundaries of the universe.

== Reception ==
Reception

Aggregate score
| Aggregator | Score |
|---|---|
| Metacritic | 58/100 |

Review scores
| Publication | Score |
|---|---|
| AllGame | 2/5 |
| Electronic Gaming Monthly | 4.17/10 (Note: Two critics of Electronic Gaming Monthly gave the game each a score of 3.5/10, and the other gave it 5.5/10.) |
| EP Daily | 6.5/10 |
| Eurogamer | 4/10 |
| Game Informer | 6.25/10 |
| GameRevolution | C+ |
| GameSpot | 4.6/10 |
| GameSpy | 63% |
| GameZone | 8.8/10 |
| IGN | 5.9/10 |
| Official Xbox Magazine (US) | 7/10 |
| Maxim | 4/10 |

Star Wars: Obi-Wan received "mixed or average" reviews according to the review aggregation website Metacritic. Pong Sifu of GamePro said, "If you enjoyed Jedi Power Battles, you might dig Obi-Wan since it does immerse you in the Episode I milieu despite its many shortcomings. Otherwise, let's hope that the impending slew of Episode II titles will contain deeper and more rewarding games." (Note: GamePro gave the game three 2.5/5 scores for graphics, control, and fun factor, and 3.5/5 for sound.)

The game won the award for "Best Sound in a Console Game" at The Electric Playground's 2001 Blister Awards, and was nominated for "Biggest Disappointment of the Year", but lost to the Xbox version of Shrek.
