= Star Wars: Flight of the Falcon =

2003 video game

- European box art
- Developer: Pocket Studios
- Publisher: THQ
- Director: David Williams
- Designers: Thomas Heaton; Chris Brams; David Williams
- Programmer: Gabriel Lee
- Artist: Tahir Rashid
- Composer: Allister Brimble
- Series: Star Wars
- Platform: Game Boy Advance
- Release: NA: November 18, 2003; EU: November 21, 2003
- Genre: First-person shooter
- Mode: Single-player

Star Wars: Flight of the Falcon is a 2003 first-person shooter video game developed by Pocket Studios and published by THQ for the Game Boy Advance. Based on the events of the original Star Wars trilogy of films, the player controls various spaceships in battles against the antagonistic Galactic Empire. The story follows the pilots of the Millennium Falcon, Han Solo and his Wookiee co-pilot Chewbacca, as they help save the galaxy from the Empire's forces.

Flight of the Falcon was first announced on June 23, 2003, and was originally scheduled to be released that summer, but the release date was pushed back to November 21, 2003. Upon its release, the game received mostly negative reviews, with criticism for its lagging graphics, gameplay, and excessively long levels; however, it received some praise for its sound design and music, as well as for its detailed level backgrounds.

== Gameplay and plot ==
Star Wars: Flight of the Falcon is a 3D aerial shooter game. It is set at the same time as the original Star Wars film trilogy, when the antagonistic Galactic Empire has taken control of the galaxy. The story follows the pilots of the Millennium Falcon, smuggler Han Solo and his Wookiee co-pilot Chewbacca. While they struggle to pay off a debt to Jabba the Hutt, soldiers of the Galactic Empire board their ship. Han Solo and Chewbacca fight them off and, after an encounter with Obi-Wan Kenobi and Luke Skywalker, flies off to help save the galaxy from the Empire.

In the game, the player is able to pilot various space craft, including the Millennium Falcon, to help the Rebel Alliance defeat the Galactic Empire's forces. Other space ships that can be piloted in the game include a speeder bike from the film Return of the Jedi, an X-wing, and a landspeeder. They are used in either close range battles or high-speed flying action. The fast landspeeder, for example, is used in a level in which the player has to finish a race before the time runs out. The weapons and protective shields on the space ships can be upgraded.

Flight of the Falcon features 14 missions that are based on the storylines from the Star Wars films. The plot of the game, however, does feature twists not seen before, such as various new battles with enemy forces. The locations of the battles include asteroid fields, canyons, and the skies of places such as the planet Yavin and the moon Endor. The player has to face enemy ships such as TIE fighters, Star Destroyers, and Boba Fett's Slave 1 ship. The Death Stars from Star Wars: A New Hope and Return of the Jedi are also attacked by the player. Flight of the Falcon does not come with a save function. Instead, players are rewarded with passwords in the game that can be entered if the console is restarted so that they can resume where they previously left off.

== Development ==
In 2000, the two video game publishers LucasArts and THQ announced that they had reached an agreement that allows THQ to turn LucasArts licenses into games for the Game Boy consoles. Star Wars: Flight of the Falcon, a Game Boy Advance game, was first announced on June 23, 2003, by THQ. The press release described it as a game in which players get to pilot "the most popular vehicle from the classic Star Wars universe," the Millennium Falcon, "in 14 combat-filled missions interweaving the movie storylines with all new plot twists." In their announcement, THQ said the game was scheduled for release in the summer of 2003. In July, the company announced that the release date had been pushed back to September 2003. The game was, however, not released until November 21, 2003.

Tiffany Ternan, senior vice president of North American sales and distribution at THQ, said they were "extremely pleased to be publishing the latest Star Wars videogame for Game Boy Advance. The broad appeal of the Star Wars franchise makes it a great addition to our leading portfolio of handheld games." Liz Allen, director of marketing for LucasArts, added that Flight of the Falcon "will once again offer Game Boy Advance players an opportunity to experience all the drama and exhilaration of the Star Wars universe. LucasArts is happy to work with THQ to bring this compelling new title to Star Wars game fans everywhere." Flight of the Falcon was developed by Pocket Studios. The first screenshots from the game were published by the video-gaming website IGN on August 28, 2003.

== Reception ==
Reception

Aggregate scores
Aggregator	Score
GameRankings	41.43%
Metacritic	39/100

Review scores
Publication	Score
Game Informer	2.25/10
GamePro	2/5
GameZone	5/10
IGN	4/10
Nintendo Life	2/10
Nintendo Power	2.3/5

Flight of the Falcon has received negative reviews; GameRankings gave it a score of 41.43%, while Metacritic gave it 39 out of 100.

Craig Harris of IGN criticized the game's graphics and gameplay. He stated that despite its powerful 3D engine, the game could not "handle what the level designers wanted to pull off in the game." Harris noted that as the missions became more complex, the engine struggled to "keep up with the action." Game Informer editor Andrew Reiner went as far as saying that "the framerate chugs along to a point where many of the stages should be classified as unplayable." The Australian's Steve Polak added to the critique by saying that "despite a smorgasbord of environments and craft to fly, the game's 3D engine is not up to the task and play is made even less pleasant by awkward controls and a lamentable aiming system."

Harris' criticism of the gameplay include the "frustrating control, chuggy animation, and levels that just go on far too long." He felt the levels needed more variety, stating that "the missions are dreadfully too long and feature very little change in gameplay regardless of the settings and craft to control." Eduardo Zacarias of GameZone also said the game had poor controls and, like Harris, criticized "the fact that the levels seem to drag on forever". He felt there were "a few things that do keep the game from being a simple shooter in outer space, such as the ability to zoom through the forests of Endor on a speeder bike," but added that "these are just minor distractions that just hide the fact that this game is just way too repetitive." Zacarias enjoyed the amount of detail in background of locations such as the forests of Endor, but criticized the vehicle graphics for looking like bad imitations. Nintendo Power gave Flight of the Falcon a score of 2.3 out of 5, echoing Harris and Zacarias's criticism of the length of the levels. The magazine stated, however, that the game has "an unmistakable Star Wars flair."

The sounds and the music were the only parts of the game that were praised by Harris, who described them as "actually pretty good" (apart from the rendition of the main Star Wars theme). Zacarias was also positive of the sound, commenting that "The Imperial March" sounds "cool and hearing it through the GBA's tiny speakers is surprisingly good. [...] The sounds of Tie Fighters and speeder bikes sound straight out of the film and listening to the explosions and laser fire just puts us there in the Star Wars universe." Like Harris, Zacarias also criticized the game's rendition of the main Star Wars theme, stating that it sounds nothing like the original.
