= Star Wars (1991 video game) =

1991 video game

- European NES box art
- Developers: Lucasfilm Games (NES); Beam Software (NES); NMS Software (GB); Tiertex (GG/MS)
- Publishers: JP: Victor INT: JVC; NA: Capcom USA (GB); NA: Nintendo of America (GB, Players Choice); NA/EU: U.S. Gold (GG/MS); EU: Ubi Soft (GB)
- Designer: Akila Redmer
- Programmer: Andrew Carter
- Artists: Gary Winnick; Harrison Fong; Armand Cabrera; Jon Knoles
- Composer: Marshall Parker
- Series: Star Wars
- Platforms: Nintendo Entertainment System, Game Boy, Master System, Game Gear
- Release: November 15, 1991: Famicom/NES; JP: November 15, 1991; NA: November 1991; EU: March 26, 1992 Game Boy; NA: November 1992; EU: June 17, 1993; NA: May 20, 1996(Players Choice) Game Gear; NA/EU: 1993 Master System; EU: October 1993
- Genre: Action-platform
- Mode: Single-player

Star Wars is an action-platform video game based on the 1977 film of the same name. It was released by Victor Musical Industries for the Family Computer in Japan on November 15, 1991, and by JVC Musical Industries for the Nintendo Entertainment System in North America in November 1991, and in Europe on March 26, 1992. An official mail order "Hint Book" was available for the game upon its release.

Two versions for handheld game consoles were released. The Game Boy port was developed by NMS Software and published by Capcom, and released shortly less than a year later in 1992. The Game Gear port was developed by Tiertex and published by U.S. Gold, and released in 1993. A Master System version was also released, which was also developed by Tiertex. The game was followed by Star Wars: The Empire Strikes Back in 1992. An NES game adaptation of Return of the Jedi never came into fruition. A counterpart of the game for the Super NES, titled Super Star Wars, was released in 1992. On June 28, 2019, the NES and Game Boy versions of Star Wars were re-released as part of both standard and "Collector's Edition" sets in limited quantities on unlicensed replica game cartridges by Limited Run Games.

== Gameplay ==
Gameplay screenshot from the NES version of the game, showing Luke Skywalker navigating a cave on Tatooine

The game follows a sequence of events loosely based on the plot of Star Wars, where Luke Skywalker is required to pilot a landspeeder around Tatooine, collect R2-D2 from the Sandcrawler, Obi-Wan Kenobi from a cave, and Han Solo from the Mos Eisley bar, all while fighting stormtroopers, Tusken Raiders, and many other different enemy characters from the movies. After assembling all the game's characters, the player must navigate the Millennium Falcon in a first-person perspective through an asteroid field to reach the Death Star (shields for the Millennium Falcon to withstand the asteroid field must also be collected in the Tatooine levels). Once arriving at the Death Star, the player is required to destroy the tractor beam generator, rescue Princess Leia from the detention block, then proceed to destroy the Death Star with the rebel fighters.

Each character has their own attributes. Han Solo and Leia can also be used to replace Luke in gameplay, but unlike Luke who has numerous lives, Han and Leia only have one life each. Obi-Wan Kenobi can resurrect Han Solo or Princess Leia five times (in the Game Gear and Master System versions, the player is even required to kill and resurrect them in order to earn the last 10% completion points and see the ending), R2-D2 can display a map of the Death Star hallways, and C-3PO can provide information on the current part of the game. Darth Vader makes his only appearance on the Game Over screen.

Chewbacca appears at the end of the Game Boy version, and is mentioned in passing several times in the NES version. It is implied in the game's instruction manual that Chewie flies the Millennium Falcon if Han Solo dies.

The Game Gear version has several exclusive levels, including a level that sees Leia delivering the stolen plans to R2-D2. Additionally, the Tatooine hub world does not appear in this version, and is replaced with three side-scrolling levels through the desert that Luke is required to travel on foot.

== Reception ==
Reception

Review scores
| Publication | Score |
|---|---|
| AllGame | 4/5 (NES); 3/5 (GG) |
| Electronic Gaming Monthly | 8/10, 7/10, 6/10, 6/10 (GB) |
| Famitsu | 5/10, 5/10, 4/10, 3/10 (NES) |
| Power Unlimited | 65% (GB) |

Victor Lucas of The Electric Playground gave the Game Gear version a 7 out of 10 and wrote, "Star Wars does feature some impressive artistic design and a few technical surprises. It's still one of the sharpest looking games available for Sega's 8-bit portable". Power Unlimited gave the Game Boy version a score of 65% summarizing: "Although this Star Wars game is incredibly versatile, it is hardly manageable. The graphics are too complicated for the Game Boy, the image is too dark and the controls are not precise enough. However, it can be played for a very long time."

The Game Gear version was a runner-up for GamePro's 1993 Hand-Held Game of the Year award.
