= Super Star Wars: The Empire Strikes Back =

1993 video game

- North American box art
- Developers: Sculptured Software; LucasArts
- Publishers: WW: JVC Musical Industries; JP: Victor Entertainment
- Director: Kalani Streicher
- Producer: Kalani Streicher
- Designer: Kalani Streicher
- Programmers: Peter Ward; Ryan Ridges
- Artists: Harrison Fong; Jon Knoles
- Composer: Paul Webb
- Series: Super Star Wars
- Platform: Super Nintendo Entertainment System
- Release: NA: November 12, 1993; JP: December 17, 1993; EU: February 18, 1994
- Genre: Action
- Mode: Single player

Super Star Wars: The Empire Strikes Back, also known as Super Empire Strikes Back, is a 1993 action video game developed by LucasArts and Sculptured Software and published by JVC Musical Industries for the Super Nintendo Entertainment System. It is based on the 1980 film The Empire Strikes Back and is the sequel to Super Star Wars. The game was followed by a sequel, Super Star Wars: Return of the Jedi in 1994. Unlike its predecessor, Nintendo was not involved in its publishing. The game was re-released on the Wii's Virtual Console in North America on August 24, 2009 and in the PAL regions on October 2, 2009, alongside the other games in the Super Star Wars series.

== Gameplay ==
Super Star Wars: The Empire Strikes Back follows closely the standard set by its predecessor, with multiple playable characters and Mode 7 quasi-3D vehicle sequences. The controls are very similar to the first game, but feature a double-jump. Luke Skywalker, Han Solo, and Chewbacca return as playable characters although the character-select option was removed.

Unlike the original game, this installment allows each character the use of a primary and secondary weapon. Following one of the swamp planet Dagobah missions, Luke Skywalker can also collect Force Powers for use in later levels. Luke can now block incoming attacks using his lightsaber, allowing him to deflect blaster fire. Han Solo can now throw grenades and Chewbacca has a new power up: a spinning attack. Sith Lord Darth Vader appears as the final boss in the video game.

== Development ==
An "asteroid chase" stage using Mode 7 effects was cut from the game due to lack of cartridge space. In late 1992 a contest was launched exclusively in Electronic Gaming Monthly, which required the contestants to answer six multi-choice questions, and for which the "Grand Prize" was to have the person's likeness appear in this forthcoming game. The winner was Jeff Crosno, for whom the developers placed his appearance on a Rebel soldier in an Ice Fields of Hoth cut-scene, replacing the already existing facial graphics.

== Release ==
In 1996, THQ announced that they would re-release Super Star Wars: The Empire Strikes Back and Super Star Wars: Return of the Jedi in February 1997 in order to coincide with the "Special Edition" of those films appearing in theaters. The re-release is identical to the original version.

== Reception ==
Reception

Review scores
Publication	Score
AllGame	4.5/5
Electronic Gaming Monthly	28/40
IGN	7.5/10
Super Gamer	85%
Power Unlimited	92%

In the United Kingdom, Super Star Wars: The Empire Strikes Back was the top-selling SNES game in February 1994.

The game was met with positive reviews. IGN gave the game a 7.5/10 rating, praising the games enhanced Mode 7 graphics. Electronic Gaming Monthly gave The Empire Strikes Back positive reviews, noting the game's graphics and sound; the reviewers praised the gameplay following the theme of the source material and having excellent cinematic displays, although there was criticism on the controls, hard difficulty and the large number of enemies that appear on screen. AllGame gave a rating of 4.5 out of 5 stars, praising the game's soundtrack, voice effects, graphics and action scenarios for being faithful to the film and giving praise to the password feature making the game less frustrating, and giving criticism to the game's blind jumps and cheap hits from enemies off screen concluding "but this doesn't spoil the overall greatness of the game." Super Gamer magazine gave the game a review score of 85% stating "Super Star Wars is reworked with new graphics. A bigger, harder and marginally, better game. The Mode 7 AT-AT attack is absolutely stunning." Power Unlimited gave a review score of 92% and noted the game is identical to its predecessor and citing the challenging difficulty and fun gameplay.

Nintendo Power staff rated the game as the fourth best SNES game of 1993. GamePro named it the best SNES game of 1993. IGN placed the game 91st in their Top 100 SNES Games of All Time. In 2018, Complex ranked the game #20 on their "The Best Super Nintendo Games of All Time." They praised the game as the best Star Wars game on the Super NES although they felt the game was the most difficult of the three games.

== See also ==
- Star Wars: The Empire Strikes Back, the NES game from previous year
