= Super Star Wars =

1992 video game

- North American SNES box art
- Developers: Sculptured Software; LucasArts (Note: PlayStation 4 and PlayStation Vita versions developed by Code Mystics)
- Publishers: JVC Musical Industries; PS4, PS Vita; Disney Interactive Studios
- Director: Kalani Streicher
- Producer: Kalani Streicher
- Designer: Kalani Streicher
- Programmer: Peter Ward
- Artists: Harrison Fong; Jon Knoles
- Composer: Paul Webb
- Series: Super Star Wars
- Platforms: Super NES, PlayStation 4, PlayStation Vita
- Release: Super NES: NA: November 1992; EU: April 2, 1993; PS4, PS Vita: NA: November 17, 2015; EU: November 24, 2015
- Genre: Run and gun
- Mode: Single-player

Super Star Wars is a 1992 run and gun video game based on the 1977 film Star Wars, developed by LucasArts and Sculptured Software and published by JVC Musical Industries for the Super Nintendo Entertainment System. The game features side-scrolling run and gun and platform gameplay, although it has stages which feature other challenges, such as driving a landspeeder or piloting an X-wing. It also features multiple playable characters with different abilities.

The game was followed by two sequels based on the subsequent Star Wars films: Super Star Wars: The Empire Strikes Back (1993) and Super Star Wars: Return of the Jedi (1994). The game was re-released in November 1996 as part of Nintendo's Player's Choice series. It was also released on the Wii's Virtual Console by LucasArts in 2009. In 2015, Disney Interactive Studios re-released the game for the PlayStation 4 and PlayStation Vita, with Code Mystics developing the ports. The port features enhanced options for saving, including cross-save, leaderboards and trophies, and modern displays and controllers. The game was also made a part of a bundle with the purchase of Star Wars Battlefront for the PlayStation 4, which included Star Wars: Racer Revenge, Star Wars: Jedi Starfighter and Star Wars Bounty Hunter.

== Gameplay ==
Gameplay

Super Star Wars generally follows the plot of Star Wars, although some allowances were made to adapt the story to suit an action game. For example, instead of simply buying C-3PO and R2-D2 from the Jawas, Luke Skywalker must fight his way to the top of a Jawa sandcrawler while leaping from a series of moving conveyor belts. Brief cutscenes between levels tell an abbreviated version of the film's story. Later stages allow the player to control smuggler and pilot Han Solo or Chewbacca the Wookiee. The game also features several vehicle-based levels in which the player takes control of an X-Wing or a landspeeder.

Most of the stages consist of run and gun and platforming gameplay, with several different upgrades available to the standard blaster weapon. Luke can also wield a lightsaber after acquiring it from Obi-Wan Kenobi. The end of the game has players reenacting Luke's Death Star trench run to destroy the Death Star, with Darth Vader confronting the player in his TIE Advanced x1.

== Development ==
Artist Jon Knoles did the visual designs for the characters, while Harrison Fong drew the backgrounds. Fong recounted that he did very little concept drawing before rendering the characters on the computer "because everybody knew what the Star Wars characters looked like." Originally, the game design was planned to give the characters a dark black outline around their bodies. However, this idea was abandoned, as it was thought to make the characters too cartoonish-looking.

The "Kalhar Boss Monster" is based on one of the chess pieces R2D2 plays with on the Millennium Falcon in the film. There was a trash compactor level that was deleted from the game due to lack of cartridge space. An image was published in an issue of Electronic Gaming Monthly around the time of the game's release.

The game's audio contains scores from the movie, which were all arranged by Sculptured Software's in-house musician Paul Webb. According to Webb, he was given the original handwritten scores that John Williams had created. Webb then used the company's in-house music software to convert the scores onto the Super NES's 8-channel sound chip. The game's instrument samples were taken from the Ensoniq EPS and EPS16 keyboards.

A PC port of Super Star Wars was in the works since 1994, by Danish game company Brain Bug and produced by Softgold. The game was almost completed, and was well into the playtesting phase, but in 1995 LucasArts decided to halt the development and cancel the release. An unfinished version of this port was leaked onto the internet.

A Mega Drive version was in the works by Sega Interactive from late 1992 to some point in 1993, but was cancelled for unknown reasons. An early prototype's ROM was dumped in 2020.

== Reception ==
Reception

Aggregate score
Aggregator	Score
GameRankings	85% (7 reviews)

Review scores
Publication	Score
Destructoid	7.5/10 (PS4)
Electronic Gaming Monthly	9/10, 9/10, 9/10, 9/10
GameFan	94% (Note: In GameFan's review, one critic gave it a 93% and another a 95%.)
GamesMaster	92%
IGN	8/10 (VC)
Jeuxvideo.com	14/20 (VC)
Nintendo Life	7/10 (VC)
Push Square	8/10 (PS4)
Super Play	89%
VideoGames & Computer Entertainment	9.2/10 (Note: In the review by VideoGames and Computer Entertainment, its main writer and three editors who provided brief score comments rated Super Star Wars a 9/10, and another editor gave it a perfect 10/10.)
Nintendo Magazine System	93/100
N-Force	95/100
Digital Press	8/10 (SNES)
Super Pro	95/100
Lens of Truth	8/10 (SNES)
The Vita Lounge	3.1/5 (Vita)

Entertainment Weekly wrote that "If you've ever fantasized about piloting an X-wing fighter into the heart of the Death Star, now you can do it—in simulated 3-D as well as reenact the movie's key plot developments." In 2009, Official Nintendo Magazine placed the game 68th on its list of the greatest Nintendo games.

Super Star Wars was awarded Best Action/Adventure Game of 1992 by Electronic Gaming Monthly, as well as Best Movie-to-Game. Super Star Wars was ranked fourth in Nintendo Power's top ten Super NES games of 1992. IGN ranked Super Star Wars 83rd on their list of the "Top 100 SNES Games of All Time". In 2018, Complex listed the game 38th in its list of "The Best Super Nintendo Games of All Time." In 1995, Total! ranked the game 60th on their list of the "Top 100 SNES Games", summarizing: "The sequels left a little to be desired but this is a great interpretation of the original and best film." In the same year, Flux magazine rated Super Star Wars 25th on its list of the "Top 100 Video Games", calling it "the second great SNES platform game after Super Mario World." They also praised the game's graphics and felt the game was easy.

== See also ==
- Star Wars, an NES game from the previous year
