= Star Wars (1987 video game) =

- Box art
- Developer: Namco
- Publisher: Namco
- Director: Kazunori Sawano
- Producer: Masaya Nakamura
- Designer: Wan Wan
- Programmer: Yoshihiro Kishimoto
- Artist: Shimada
- Composer: Hiroyuki Kawada
- Series: Star Wars
- Platform: Family Computer
- Release: JP: December 4, 1987
- Genre: Platform
- Mode: Single-player

Star Wars (Note: Japanese: スターウォーズ, Hepburn: Sutā Wōzu) is a Family Computer video game released in 1987 by Namco. It is the first platform game based on the Star Wars franchise. Despite being based on the first Star Wars film, some levels are based on the later two Star Wars films. It is one of only two games in the Star Wars franchise that were released exclusively in Japan, the other being Star Wars: Attack on the Death Star. The player controls Luke Skywalker as he travels to join the Rebellion against the Empire.

While domestically Star Wars was No. 99 out of the 100 top-selling Famicom games in 1987 according to Famicom Hisshōbon, the game is remembered abroad—often negatively—for its steep difficulty and bizarre deviations from the source material.

== Gameplay ==
Star Wars is a single-player side-scrolling platform game with two difficulty settings: novice and pro. Luke uses a lightsaber as his primary weapon and can also use the Force to execute special maneuvers like floating, speeding and stopping time. Energy to activate Force powers can be obtained through diamonds collected after killing an enemy, called "Force points". At the end of each level, the player must fight one of several apprentices of Darth Vader, who initially look the same as Vader himself, but will change into other creatures when hit for the first time. In two levels, the Death Star and Yavin IV, the player actually does fight the real Darth Vader. When the characters are rescued, they will help Luke by providing hints and other actions that are important to progress through the game. Certain actions at some levels require talking to the characters via an in-game menu.

Between planets, players control the Millennium Falcon from the cockpit as they fight TIE fighters that prevent the ship's entrance to the next planet.

The final level involves using the X-wing against the Death Star. While the film's climactic sequence occurred inside a long trench, the game's version can be roughly described as a vertically scrolling overhead maze-like stage, complete with dead ends and intersections. At the end, there is the reactor's duct where the proton torpedoes will be shot automatically to destroy the station. If the player fails to get to the end within a limited amount of time, the Death Star will destroy Yavin IV, and the game will be over.

The game is particularly difficult, as the player only has three lives and two continues (activated with enough Force points), and Luke dies upon touching an enemy. The Millennium Falcon and the X-Wing can sustain only one hit before being destroyed, which can be prevented by using one of three deflector shield bursts.

The game deviates from the source material, with the aforementioned examples of Darth Vader having identical apprentices that shape-shift, along with going to planets that never happened in the 1977 film, such as going to an ice planet after rescuing Leia from the Death Star.

== Development ==
The game design is strongly inspired by the Master System game Alex Kidd in Miracle World, according to programmer Yoshihiro Kishimoto. The game was first announced in May 1987, and it came with a photo of George Lucas shaking hands with Namco founder Masaya Nakamura.

The video game introduced minor antagonists with their names coining "Vader" yet designed after diverse motifs; Sasori Vader (scorpion), Clados Vader (shark), Gyaos Vader (the kaiju of the same name from the Gamera franchise), and Wampa Vader—an allusion to the "Cave of Evil" scene in The Empire Strikes Back.

== Reception ==
Reception

Review score
Publication	Score
Power Play	75/100

According to Famicom Hisshōbon, Star Wars was the 99th top-selling Famicom game in Japan in 1987.

German magazine Power Play wrote a positive review, lauding the game's graphics and sound effects. It also praised the gameplay, comparing it to Kid Icarus and Zelda II: The Adventure of Link with shootouts added to the mix, though it criticized the inability to skip the introductory sequence and the lack of the continue option after losing all one's lives. It also noted the relative ease of guessing the meaning of the comments without knowledge of the Japanese language.

However, retrospective analyses tended to be dismissive of Star Wars, often deriding it for its difficulty and the absurd ways in which the game departs from the original film. In 2008, Wired listed it as one of the worst film-to-game adaptations of all time. In its feature revisiting almost every Star Wars title hitherto released, 1Up.com likewise disregarded the Namco title as a whole, but found the gameplay to be too zany to pass over. IGN also ranked it No. 8 on its list of the ten worst Star Wars games, due to the enemies' lack of semblance with the characters in the film, as well as the "punishingly difficult" nature of the game with its "brutally unfair" levels.

Darth Vader's transformation into a scorpion during the player's first encounter with him has been remarked for its outlandishness in gaming. Retro Gamer described the graphics as being the most faithful to the franchise at the time, shunning the kawaii aspect common in Japanese culture. It also noted how Namco's adaptation of an entire Star Wars episode differed from Atari, Inc.'s and Parker Brothers' approach to developing games based merely on segments, usually involving piloting a spaceship or space combat.
