= Star Wars Episode I: Jedi Power Battles =

2000 video game

- Developers: LucasArts (Note: Remastered version developed by Aspyr.); HotGen Studios Ltd (GBA)
- Publishers: LucasArts (PS, DC); THQ (GBA); Aspyr (remasters)
- Directors: Robert Blackadder; Kevin Boyle
- Designers: Bill Hennes; Carl Wattenberg; Martin Yee; Michael Licht; Rebecca Perez
- Programmers: Robert Blackadder; Charlie Skilbeck
- Artists: Kevin Boyle; Bill Hennes; Paul Davies
- Writer: Haden Blackman
- Series: Star Wars
- Platforms: PlayStation, Dreamcast, Game Boy Advance, Nintendo Switch, PlayStation 4, PlayStation 5, Windows, Xbox One, Xbox Series X/S
- Release: April 4, 2000: PlayStation; NA: April 4, 2000; EU: May 5, 2000 Dreamcast; NA: October 4, 2000; EU: October 2000 Game Boy Advance; NA: December 4, 2001; EU: March 1, 2002 Switch, PS4, PS5, Windows, Xbox One, Xbox Series X/S; WW: January 23, 2025
- Genre: Action
- Modes: Single-player, multiplayer

Star Wars Episode I: Jedi Power Battles is a 2000 action video game based on the 1999 film Star Wars: Episode I – The Phantom Menace. It was released for the PlayStation and Dreamcast in 2000, followed by the Game Boy Advance in 2001 (under the title Star Wars: Jedi Power Battles). A remastered version of the game was released for Windows, Nintendo Switch, PlayStation 4, PlayStation 5, Xbox One, and Xbox Series X/S in January 2025.

== Gameplay ==
Jedi Masters Mace Windu and Plo Koon fighting Trade Federation battle droids

Jedi Power Battles is an action game that combines elements of the platform and beat 'em up genres. Emphasis is placed both on completing jumping sequences and defeating enemies. Players can choose from one of five prequel-era Jedi and run, jump, slash, and use the Force through the game's ten levels, starting on the Trade Federation Battleship and ending with the battle against Darth Maul on Naboo. The player's primary weapon is a lightsaber used to fight through waves of enemies and deflect blaster shots. The lightsaber combat is rather simplified with a system that lets the player lock on to the nearest enemy using the R1 button. Items and the force can also be used for special attacks. On most levels jumping puzzles make up a large portion of the challenge. There are a few segments in which the player can pilot various craft. The single player campaign can also be played in cooperative mode with a second player, while the Dreamcast version has an additional training mode and a two player duel mode. As players progress additional lightsaber combos and force powers are unlocked.

Five primary characters are available for players to use; Jedi Padawan Obi-Wan Kenobi, and Jedi Masters Qui-Gon Jinn, Mace Windu, Adi Gallia and Plo Koon, with the latter two being unavailable in the Game Boy Advance version. Characters have specific lightsaber styles, force powers, weaknesses and strengths. The game features both characters and levels that can be unlocked by completing specific tasks in the game, such as completing the game with a specific character. Up to four additional unlockable characters are available, depending on platform. Queen Amidala of Naboo and Captain Panaka, head of the Queen's security forces, are the only two playable characters to utilize ranged weapons. Sith Apprentice Darth Maul and Jedi Master Ki-Adi Mundi are also unlockable, though the latter was exclusive to the Dreamcast version of the game until his inclusion in the 2025 remaster. Four levels can be unlocked which offer players unique minigames.

== Plot ==
The game loosely follows the plot of The Phantom Menace and begins as two Jedi are sent to negotiate an agreement between the corrupt Trade Federation and the royal government of Naboo. The meeting turns out to be a trap and the two Jedi manage to fight their way through battle droids on the Trade Federation ship. The pair eventually make it to the planet's surface, where they fight through the swamps that eventually lead to the streets of Naboo's capital city, Theed. In the ensuing battle the Jedi are forced to flee with Naboo's Queen Amidala and several trusted members of her court on her starship.

The group arrives on Tatooine, where they hope to acquire parts to repair the Queen's ship. The environment proves hostile, and the Jedi are forced to defend themselves against Tusken Raiders and an attack by a dark-robed assassin while the parts are acquired. The group eventually makes their way to Coruscant, where a group of criminals instigate an attack. The Jedi fight their way through the attackers to see the queen to the Galactic Senate building. Concerned for the welfare of her planet and finding no hope in the apathetic Senate, the Queen and Jedi return to Naboo to liberate the city of Theed from the control of the Trade Federation.

Now allied with the Gungans of Naboo, the two Jedi fight their way through Gungan ruins to the city. They arrive and liberate a pair of droid STAPs. Utilizing the vehicle's limber controls and fast firing weaponry, they fight their way to the royal palace. Upon arriving the Jedi scale the side of the palace, using their force abilities to jump from platform to platform until they ascend to the top. Arriving, they find their progress blocked by the Sith apprentice Darth Maul, who had previously tried to kill them on Tatooine. The Sith engages the two Jedi as they push through the palace's generator complex. The Jedi gain the upper hand and Maul is defeated. The Jedi celebrate their victory with Boss Nass, leader of the Gungans, and Queen Amidala in a large celebration within the city of Theed. Yoda states that it is far from over, as Sidious is still out there.

== Development and marketing ==
Level design began with what designer Michael Stuart Licht referred to as spatial studies. Design began with paper cut outs of various rooms. Licht would rearrange these rooms until he found a design that he felt worked. The papers had design ideas written on them so that other developers could understand the overall flow of each level. Bubble diagrams were then created which represented main ideas for each space. This was followed by various stages of overview drawings and other drawing studies. 3D level design began after such studies were completed.

Characters were developed to have not only unique force abilities and lightsaber combos, but different lightsaber colors as well. Three characters had not yet had an on-screen appearance wielding their lightsabers. These colors matched the marketing coordination at the time seen in the Kenner toyline and Dark Horse comics. Jedi Masters Mace Windu, Adi Gallia and Plo Koon utilize blue, crimson and orange lightsabers in the game, respectively. Windu would go on to change to a purple color for his saber in Star Wars Episode II: Attack of the Clones. In the sequels Lucas would reveal that majority of Jedi only carry blue or green blades. Yoda was also off-limits as an unlockable character and it was not permitted to show him with a lightsaber, instead the sound of his laughter is heard every time the player collects a power-up.

Jedi Power Battles was first unveiled in March 2000 via a gameplay trailer. Following the PlayStation release, developers sought to make improvements for the then upcoming Dreamcast version. Amongst improvements were 60 frames per second gameplay, tweaks to platforming sections, and a bugfix that ensured unlockable character Darth Maul would use both blades of his lightsaber, unlike his single blade on the PlayStation. Improvements in character animation were also made, and the game runs on a higher resolution. HotGen Studios developed a GameBoy Advance game based on Jedi Power Battles. It was released a full year after the console releases in the fall of 2001.

On October 10, 2024, Lucasfilm Games announced Aspyr would be releasing a remastered version of the game for Windows (via Steam and GOG.com) as well as Nintendo Switch, PlayStation 4, PlayStation 5, Xbox One, and Xbox Series X/S on January 23, 2025. This version adds the option to switch Mace Windu, Plo Koon, and Adi Gallia's lightsaber colors from their original game colors of blue, yellow, and red respectively to their canonically-accurate colors of purple for Windu and blue for Koon and Gallia, as well as adding 13 characters from the story mode and the Dreamcast version's added bonus modes as playable characters.

== Reception ==
Reception

Aggregate scores
Aggregator	Score		
Aggregator	Dreamcast	GBA	PS
GameRankings	75%	57%	57%
Metacritic	76/100	58/100	N/A

Review scores
Publication	Score		
Publication	Dreamcast	GBA	PS
AllGame	3/5	2/5	2.5/5
CNET Gamecenter	7/10	N/A	3/10
Electronic Gaming Monthly	8/10	N/A	4.17/10 (Note: In Electronic Gaming Monthly's review of the PlayStation version, two critics gave it each a score of 4/10, and the other gave it 4.5/10.)
Eurogamer	N/A	N/A	4/10
Game Informer	8/10	6.25/10	8/10
GameFan	79%	N/A	62%
GameSpot	5.8/10	N/A	5.4/10
GameSpy	7/10	N/A	N/A
GameZone	N/A	8/10	N/A
IGN	6.8/10	4/10	3/10
Next Generation	3/5	N/A	2/5
Nintendo Power	N/A	2.9/5	N/A
Official U.S. PlayStation Magazine	N/A	N/A	2.5/5

The Dreamcast version received "generally favorable reviews", while the Game Boy Advance and PlayStation versions received "mixed or average" reviews, according to the review aggregation website Metacritic. Jeff Lundrigan of NextGen said in its July 2000 issue that the PlayStation version "really needed a few more months of playtesting and balancing. As it is, this is best approached as an exercise in anger management." Six issues later, however, Chris Charla said of the Dreamcast version, "Super Empire Strikes Back this isn't, but if you're looking for a hack-and-slash time killer, it'll satisfy." Uncle Dust of GamePro said of the PlayStation version in its June 2000 issue, "Jedi Power Battles gets off to a frustrating start and has too much platform jumping throughout. But after you slash through the legions of battle droids to reach Darth Maul, you'll remember the thrill of the fight and forget the agony of the jumps." (Note: GamePro gave the PlayStation version two 4/5 scores for graphics and fun factor, 5/5 for sound, and 3.5/5 for control.) Six issues later, Extreme Ahab said of the Dreamcast version, "if you have a high tolerance for falling repeatedly to your virtual death, JPB will reward you with spectacular visuals and hours of Star Wars fun." (Note: GamePro gave the Dreamcast version two 5/5 scores for graphics and sound, 4/5 for control, and 4.5/5 for fun factor.)

The game placed 30th in Game Informer's top 30 Star Wars games list in 2016.

Reviewers were critical of the game's high difficulty. In the book Rogue Leaders: The Story of LucasArts, author Rob Smith said the media had a "tepid response" to the game's difficult control system. Edwin Evans-Thirlwell of Vice magazine expressed fondness for the game's cooperative mode. He noted that while the game was "dreadful" he praised the incentive for two players to work together to complete the game. He cited modern games such as those in the Call of Duty series, noting that with online play the desire to work as a team is lessened. This in turn brought his point that Jedi Power Battles provides an opportunity for two people to sit together and truly cooperatively work through the game.
