= Star Wars: The Empire Strikes Back (1982 video game) =

- European Atari 2600 cover art
- Developer: Parker Brothers
- Publisher: Parker Brothers
- Programmer: Rex Bradford
- Series: Star Wars
- Platforms: Atari 2600, Intellivision
- Release: 2600; July 1982; Intellivision; August 1983
- Genre: Scrolling shooter
- Modes: Single-player, multiplayer

Star Wars: The Empire Strikes Back is a scrolling shooter video game based on the 1980 film The Empire Strikes Back, programmed by Rex Bradford for the Atari 2600 and published by Parker Brothers in 1982. It was the first licensed Star Wars video game. An Intellivision version was released in 1983.

== Gameplay ==
Intellivision screenshot

The player must control Luke Skywalker in a snowspeeder to battle against Imperial AT-AT walkers on the planet Hoth. The objective is to hold off the walkers as long as possible before they blow up the power generator at the Rebels' Echo Base. The difficulty levels included several variables, including the initial speed of the walkers, whether or not the walkers were solid, and whether or not the walkers included a "smart bomb."

The player can destroy a walker by shooting it repeatedly in the head or torso; shots to the legs are ineffective. As the walker is damaged, it changes colors, transitioning from black (undamaged) through various shades of gray, red, and orange to yellow (critically damaged). The player can also destroy the walkers by shooting a small flashing spot that may appear during gameplay for a one-hit kill. On the Intellivision, the walkers require thirty hits to take down, compared to forty-eight hits on the Atari.

The walkers shoot back at the player, whose speeder also changes colors as it receives damage. The player can land a damaged speeder to repair it. If the player survives for two minutes, the speeder is granted the power of the Force for a short time, briefly becoming invulnerable. On some game levels, the walkers are solid, meaning that the player can crash into them, damaging them and destroying the player. Other levels include a smart bomb which periodically launches from the flashing port on a walker and follows the player for a time. If the player is hit by the smart bomb, their speeder is destroyed.

The game ends when the player's fifth speeder is destroyed or when the lead walker reaches Echo Base, destroying it. As the game progresses, the walkers move more rapidly, increasing the difficulty level.

== Reception ==
The game was a commercial success, becoming one of the year's two best-selling video games of 1982 for Parker Brothers, along with Frogger. In 1982, it was reported that both games had sold a combined 3 million cartridges.

Star Wars: The Empire Strikes Back received mixed reviews. It was reviewed in Video magazine shortly after its release. Reviewers praised the game's "zingy graphics" and noted that "the audio-visual effects are absolutely first-rate". Overall they characterized it as "an entertaining fast-paced contest that belongs in the cartridge libraries of most (Atari)VCS owners". That same month, rival publication Video Review magazine ran a review of the game written by science fiction author Harlan Ellison who blasted the game as a "shamelessly exploitative little toy", "the latest icon of the Imbecile Industry", and a "time-wasting enterprise". However, the brunt of Ellison's criticism came from his dissatisfaction with the game's ending both of which are failure conditions (either all of the player's units are destroyed or the lead enemy reaches the player's base).

Ed Driscoll reviewed The Empire Strikes Back in The Space Gamer No. 55. Driscoll commented that "I'd have to say that the good points outweigh the bad, and it is fun to play. I'd say that this is an excellent start for a company new to the VCS scene. May the Force be with you!" Computer and Video Games retrospectively reviewed the game in 1989, giving it a 46% score.
