= List of LucasArts games =

This is a list of video games developed, published, or licensed by Lucasfilm Games (formerly LucasArts from 1990 to 2021).

Title	System	Release date	Developer(s)	Publisher(s)	Ref(s)
Ballblazer	Amstrad CPC, Apple II, Atari 8-bit, Atari 5200, Atari 7800, Commodore 64, MSX, NES, ZX Spectrum	1985	Lucasfilm Games	Epyx; Activision; Atari Corporation	
Rescue on Fractalus!	Amstrad CPC, Apple II, Atari 5200, Atari 8-bit, Commodore 64, Commodore 128, TRS-80, ZX Spectrum	1985	Lucasfilm Games	Epyx; Activision; Atari Corporation	
The Eidolon	Amstrad CPC, Apple II, Atari 8-bit, Commodore 64, MSX, ZX Spectrum	1985	Lucasfilm Games	Epyx; Activision	
Habitat	Commodore 64	1985	Lucasfilm Games	Quantum Link; Fujitsu	
Koronis Rift	Amstrad CPC, Atari 8-bit, Commodore 64, MSX, ZX Spectrum	December 1985	Lucasfilm Games	Epyx	
Labyrinth: The Computer Game	Apple II, Commodore 64, MSX2	1986	Lucasfilm Games, Pack-In-Video	Activision	
PHM Pegasus	Amstrad CPC, Apple II, Commodore 64, MS-DOS, ZX Spectrum	1986	Lucasfilm Games	Electronic Arts	
Maniac Mansion	Amiga, Apple II, Atari ST, Commodore 64, MS-DOS, NES	October 5, 1987	Lucasfilm Games	Lucasfilm Games	
Strike Fleet	Amiga, Apple II, Atari ST, Commodore 64, MS-DOS	1988	Lucasfilm Games	Electronic Arts	
Battlehawks 1942	Amiga, Atari ST, MS-DOS	October 1988	Lucasfilm Games	Lucasfilm Games	
Zak McKracken and the Alien Mindbenders	Amiga, Atari ST, Commodore 64, FM Towns, MS-DOS	October 1988	Lucasfilm Games	LucasFilm Games	
Indiana Jones and the Last Crusade: The Action Game	Amiga, Amstrad CPC, Atari ST, Commodore 64, Game Boy, Game Gear, MS-DOS, MSX, NES, Master System, Genesis/Mega Drive, ZX Spectrum	1989	Tiertex Design Studios	U.S. Gold	
Pipe Dream	Archimedes, Acorn Electron, Amiga, Amstrad CPC, Apple II, Apple IIGS, Arcade, Atari ST, BBC Micro, Commodore 64, Game Boy, Mac, NES, MS-DOS, SAM Coupé, Windows, ZX Spectrum	June 1989	The Assembly Line	Lucasfilm Games (NA); Empire Interactive (EU); Video System (Arcade)	
Indiana Jones and the Last Crusade: The Graphic Adventure	Amiga, Amiga CDTV, Atari ST, FM Towns, Mac, MS-DOS	July 1989	Lucasfilm Games	Lucasfilm Games	
Their Finest Hour	Amiga, Atari ST, MS-DOS	October 1989	Lucasfilm Games	Lucasfilm Games	
Their Finest Missions: Volume One	Amiga, Atari ST, MS-DOS	October 1989	Lucasfilm Games	Lucasfilm Games	
Loom	Amiga, Atari ST, FM Towns, Mac, MS-DOS, TurboGrafx-16	January 1990	Lucasfilm Games	Lucasfilm Games	
Masterblazer	Amiga, Atari ST, MS-DOS	1990	Rainbow Arts	Lucasfilm Games	
Night Shift	Amiga, Amstrad CPC, Atari ST, Commodore 64, MS-DOS, ZX Spectrum	October 1990	Attention to Detail	Lucasfilm Games	
The Secret of Monkey Island	Amiga, Atari ST, CDTV, FM Towns, Mac, MS-DOS, Sega CD	October 1990	Lucasfilm Games	Lucasfilm Games	
Secret Weapons of the Luftwaffe: P-38: Lightning	MS-DOS	1991	LucasArts	LucasArts	
Secret Weapons of the Luftwaffe: P-80: Shooting Star	MS-DOS	1991	LucasArts	LucasArts	
Secret Weapons of the Luftwaffe	MS-DOS	August 1991	Lucasfilm Games	Lucasfilm Games	
Star Wars	NES, Game Boy, Master System, Game Gear	November 15, 1991	Lucasfilm Games, Beam Software	JP: Victor; INT: JVC; NA: Capcom (GB); NA: Nintendo (GB Players Choice); NA/EU: U.S. Gold(GG/MS); EU: Ubisoft (GB); SA: Tec Toy	
Monkey Island 2: LeChuck's Revenge	Amiga, FM Towns, Mac, MS-DOS	December 1991	LucasArts	Lucasfilm Games	
Secret Weapons of the Luftwaffe: He162 Volksjaeger	MS-DOS	1992	LucasArts	LucasArts	
Secret Weapons of the Luftwaffe: Do335 Pfeil	MS-DOS	1992	LucasArts	LucasArts	
Indiana Jones and the Fate of Atlantis	Amiga, FM Towns, Mac, MS-DOS, Wii, Windows	June 1992	LucasArts	LucasArts	
Indiana Jones and the Fate of Atlantis: The Action Game	Amiga, Amstrad CPC, Atari ST, Commodore 64, MS-DOS, ZX Spectrum	1992	Attention to Detail Limited	LucasArts	
LucasArts Classic Adventures (Note: A compilation of previously released titles.)	Amiga, MS-DOS	1992	LucasArts	LucasArts	
Star Wars: The Empire Strikes Back	Game Boy, NES	March 12, 1992	LucasArts, Sculptured Software	JVC	
Defenders of Dynatron City	NES	July 1992	LucasArts	JVC	
Super Star Wars	SNES, Virtual Console	November 1992	Sculptured Software, LucasArts	JVC Musical Industries/Nintendo (US Version 1.1) LucasArts (Virtual Console); Disney Interactive Studios(PS4/PS Vita)	
The Young Indiana Jones Chronicles	NES	December 1992	Jaleco	Jaleco	
Star Wars: X-Wing	Mac, MS-DOS, Windows (Collector Series)	March 4, 1993	LucasArts	LucasArts	
Day of the Tentacle	Mac, MS-DOS, Linux, PlayStation 4, PlayStation Vita, iOS (Remastered)	June 25, 1993	LucasArts, Double Fine Productions (Remastered)	LucasArts	
Star Wars Arcade	Arcade, Sega 32X	August 1993	Sega AM3 R&D	Sega, LucasArts	
Zombies Ate My Neighbors	Genesis/Mega Drive, SNES, Virtual Console	September 1993	LucasArts	Konami; LucasArts (Wii Virtual Console)	
Sam & Max Hit the Road	Mac, MS-DOS, Windows	November 1993	LucasArts	LucasArts	
Super Star Wars: The Empire Strikes Back	SNES, Virtual Console	November 12, 1993	Sculptured Software, LucasArts	JVC, later re-released by THQ (SNES) LucasArts (Virtual Console)	
Star Wars: Rebel Assault	3DO, Mac, MS-DOS, Sega CD	November 25, 1993	LucasArts	LucasArts	
Star Wars X-Wing: Imperial Pursuit	Mac, MS-DOS	1993	LucasArts	LucasArts	
Star Wars X-Wing: B-Wing	Mac, MS-DOS	1993	LucasArts	LucasArts	
Star Wars Chess	MS-DOS, Sega CD, Windows	1993	The Software Toolworks	LucasArts	
Air Combat Classics ^{C}	MS-DOS	1994	Totally Games	LucasArts	
Star Wars Screen Entertainment	Windows	1994	Presage Software	LucasArts	
Instruments of Chaos starring Young Indiana Jones	Genesis/Mega Drive	June 1, 1994	Brian A. Rice, Inc.	Sega	
Star Wars: TIE Fighter	Mac, MS-DOS, Windows (Collector Series)	July 1994	LucasArts	LucasArts	
Indiana Jones' Greatest Adventures	SNES, Virtual Console	October 1994	Factor 5, LucasArts	JVC, LucasArts	
Super Star Wars: Return of the Jedi	Game Boy, Game Gear, SNES, Virtual Console	November 1, 1994	Sculptured Software, LucasArts	NA: JVC, later re-released by THQ (SNES); JP/EU: JVC (SNES); NA/EU: Black Pearl Software (GB/GG)	
Ghoul Patrol	SNES, Virtual Console	November 1994	LucasArts	JVC; LucasArts (Wii Virtual Console)	
Star Wars: TIE Fighter: Defender of the Empire	Mac, MS-DOS	1994	LucasArts	LucasArts	
Star Wars: Dark Forces	Mac, MS-DOS, PlayStation	February 28, 1995	LucasArts	LucasArts	
Metal Warriors	SNES	April 1995	LucasArts	Konami	
Full Throttle	MS-DOS, Mac, Windows (Remastered)	April 30, 1995	LucasArts Double Fine Productions (Remastered)	LucasArts, Double Fine Productions (Remastered)	
Big Sky Trooper	SNES	October 1995	LucasArts	JVC	
The Dig	Mac, MS-DOS	November 24, 1995	LucasArts	LucasArts	
Star Wars: Rebel Assault II: The Hidden Empire	Mac, MS-DOS, PlayStation, Windows	November 24, 1995	LucasArts	LucasArts	
Star Wars: TIE Fighter: Enemies of the Empire	Macintosh, MS-DOS	1995	LucasArts	LucasArts	
Indiana Jones and His Desktop Adventures	Mac, Windows	April 1996	LucasArts	LucasArts	
Afterlife	Mac, MS-DOS, Windows	June 27, 1996	LucasArts	LucasArts	
Mortimer and the Riddles of the Medallion	Mac, Windows	1996	LucasArts	LucasArts	
Star Wars: Shadows of the Empire	Nintendo 64, Windows	December 3, 1996	LucasArts	Nintendo (Nintendo 64); LucasArts (Windows)	
Star Wars: Yoda Stories	Game Boy Color, Windows	March 12, 1997	LucasArts	LucasArts	
Outlaws	Windows	April 7, 1997	LucasArts	LucasArts	
Ballblazer Champions	PlayStation	April 1997	Factor 5	LucasArts	
Star Wars: X-Wing vs. TIE Fighter	Windows	April 30, 1997	Totally Games	LucasArts	
Herc's Adventures	PlayStation, Sega Saturn	July 14, 1997	Big Ape Productions, LucasArts	LucasArts	
Star Wars Jedi Knight: Dark Forces II	Windows	October 10, 1997	LucasArts	LucasArts	
Monopoly Star Wars	Windows	October 31, 1997	Artech Studios	Hasbro Interactive	
Star Wars: Masters of Teräs Käsi	PlayStation	October 31, 1997	LucasArts	LucasArts	
The Curse of Monkey Island	Windows	November 11, 1997	LucasArts	LucasArts	
Star Wars: X-Wing vs. TIE Fighter: Balance of Power Campaigns	Windows	November 30, 1997	Totally Games	LucasArts	
Star Wars Jedi Knight: Mysteries of the Sith	Windows	February 17, 1998	LucasArts	LucasArts	
Star Wars: Rebellion	Windows	March 25, 1998	Coolhand Interactive	LucasArts	
Star Wars: Behind the Magic	Windows	September 1998	LucasArts	LucasArts	
Star Wars: DroidWorks	Windows, Mac	October 21, 1998	Lucas Learning	Lucas Learning	
Grim Fandango	Windows, Mac, Linux, PlayStation Vita, Android, iOS (Remastered)	October 30, 1998	LucasArts, Double Fine Productions (Remastered)	LucasArts, Double Fine Productions (Remastered)	
Star Wars Trilogy Arcade	Arcade	November 1998	Sega AM5	Sega, LucasArts	
Star Wars: Rogue Squadron	Nintendo 64, Windows	December 3, 1998	Factor 5, LucasArts	LucasArts	
Star Wars: X-Wing Alliance	Windows	March 15, 1999	Totally Games	LucasArts	
Star Wars Episode I: The Phantom Menace	PlayStation, Windows	May 18, 1999	Big Ape Productions	LucasArts	
Star Wars Episode I: Racer	Dreamcast, Game Boy Color, Macintosh, Nintendo 64, Windows	May 18, 1999	LucasArts	LucasArts	
Star Wars Episode I: The Gungan Frontier	Windows, Mac	May 24, 1999	Lucas Learning	Lucas Learning	
Star Wars Episode I: Insider's Guide	Windows, Mac, PlayStation	June 23, 1999	LucasArts	LucasArts	
Star Wars: Yoda’s Challenge Activity Center	Windows, Mac	August 17, 1999	Lucas Learning	Lucas Learning	
Star Wars: Pit Droids	Windows, Mac	September 13, 1999	Lucas Learning	Lucas Learning	
Indiana Jones and the Infernal Machine	Game Boy Color, Nintendo 64, Windows	November 15, 1999	LucasArts	LucasArts	
Star Wars: Force Commander	Windows	March 17, 2000	LucasArts, Ronin Entertainment	LucasArts	
Star Wars: Anakin’s Speedway	Windows, Mac	March 20, 2000	Lucas Learning	Lucas Learning	
Star Wars Episode I: Jedi Power Battles	Dreamcast, Game Boy Advance, PlayStation	April 4, 2000	LucasArts	LucasArts	
Star Wars: Racer Arcade	Arcade	May 2000	Sega AM5, LucasArts	Sega, LucasArts	
Star Wars: Early Learning Activity Center	Windows, Mac	August 15, 2000	Lucas Learning	Lucas Learning	
Star Wars: Math - Jabba's Game Galaxy	Windows, Mac	September 1, 2000	Argonaut Software	Lucas Learning	
Escape from Monkey Island	Mac, PlayStation 2, Windows	November 8, 2000	LucasArts	LucasArts	
Star Wars: Demolition	Dreamcast, PlayStation	November 12, 2000	Luxoflux	LucasArts	
Star Wars: Jar Jar’s Journey	Windows, Mac	November 15, 2000	Lucas Learning	Lucas Learning	
Star Wars Episode I: Obi-Wan's Adventures	Game Boy Color	November 27, 2000	HotGen	THQ, LucasArts	
Star Wars: Episode I: Battle for Naboo	Nintendo 64, Windows	December 18, 2000	Factor 5, LucasArts	LucasArts	
Star Wars: Starfighter	PlayStation 2, Xbox, Windows	February 19, 2001	LucasArts	LucasArts	
Star Wars: Super Bombad Racing	PlayStation 2	April 23, 2001	Lucas Learning	LucasArts	
Star Wars: Galactic Battlegrounds	Mac, Windows	November 9, 2001	LucasArts, Ensemble Studios	LucasArts	
Star Wars Rogue Squadron II: Rogue Leader	GameCube	November 18, 2001	Factor 5, LucasArts	LucasArts	
Star Wars: Obi-Wan	Xbox	December 19, 2001	LucasArts	LucasArts	
Star Wars Racer Revenge	PlayStation 2	February 11, 2002	Rainbow Studios (THQ Nordic)	LucasArts	
Star Wars: Jedi Starfighter	PlayStation 2, Xbox	March 10, 2002	LucasArts	LucasArts	
Star Wars Jedi Knight II: Jedi Outcast	GameCube, Mac, Windows, Xbox	March 26, 2002	Raven Software, Vicarious Visions	LucasArts	
Star Wars: Galactic Battlegrounds: Clone Campaigns	Mac, Windows	May 14, 2002	LucasArts, Ensemble Studios	LucasArts	
Star Wars: Episode II – Attack of the Clones	Game Boy Advance	May 30, 2002	David A. Palmer Productions	THQ, LucasArts	
Star Wars: The Clone Wars	GameCube, PlayStation 2, Xbox	October 28, 2002	Pandemic Studios	LucasArts	
Star Wars: The New Droid Army	Game Boy Advance	November 14, 2002	Helixe	THQ, LucasArts	
Star Wars: Bounty Hunter	GameCube, PlayStation 2	November 19, 2002	LucasArts	LucasArts	
Indiana Jones and the Emperor's Tomb	Mac, PlayStation 2, Windows, Xbox	February 24, 2003	The Collective	LucasArts	
RTX Red Rock	PlayStation 2	June 17, 2003	LucasArts	LucasArts	
Star Wars Galaxies	Windows	June 26, 2003	Sony Online Entertainment, Electronic Arts	LucasArts	
Star Wars: Knights of the Old Republic	Mac, Xbox, Windows	July 15, 2003	BioWare	LucasArts	
Star Wars Jedi Knight: Jedi Academy	Mac, Windows, Xbox	September 17, 2003	Raven Software, Vicarious Visions	LucasArts, Activision	
Star Wars Rogue Squadron III: Rebel Strike	GameCube	October 15, 2003	Factor 5	LucasArts	
Gladius	GameCube, PlayStation 2, Xbox	October 28, 2003	LucasArts	LucasArts	
Secret Weapons Over Normandy	PlayStation 2, Windows, Xbox	November 18, 2003	Totally Games	LucasArts	
Star Wars: Flight of the Falcon	Game Boy Advance	November 18, 2003	Pocket Studios	THQ, LucasArts	
Armed and Dangerous	Windows, Xbox	December 2, 2003	Planet Moon Studios	LucasArts	
Wrath Unleashed	PlayStation 2, Xbox	February 10, 2004	The Collective	LucasArts	
Star Wars: Battlefront	Mac, mobile phone, PlayStation 2, Windows, Xbox	September 21, 2004	Pandemic Studios	LucasArts	
Star Wars Trilogy: Apprentice of the Force	Game Boy Advance	September 21, 2004	Ubisoft Montreal	Ubisoft, LucasArts	
Star Wars Galaxies: Jump to Lightspeed	Windows	October 27, 2004	Sony Online Entertainment	LucasArts	
Star Wars Knights of the Old Republic II: The Sith Lords	Mac, Xbox, Windows	December 6, 2004	Obsidian Entertainment	LucasArts	
Mercenaries: Playground of Destruction	PlayStation 2, Xbox	January 11, 2005	Pandemic Studios	LucasArts	
Star Wars: Republic Commando	Mobile phone, Xbox, Windows	February 17, 2005	LucasArts	LucasArts	
Lego Star Wars: The Video Game	Game Boy Advance, GameCube, Mac, PlayStation 2, Windows, Xbox	April 2, 2005	Traveller's Tales, Griptonite Games, Aspyr, Giant Interactive Entertainment	Eidos Interactive, Giant Interactive Entertainment, Aspyr	
Star Wars: Episode III: Revenge of the Sith	Game Boy Advance, handheld TV game, mobile phone, Nintendo DS, PlayStation 2, Xbox	May 4, 2005	The Collective, Ubisoft Montreal (Handheld)	LucasArts, Ubisoft (Handheld)	
Star Wars Galaxies: Episode III Rage of the Wookiees	Windows	May 5, 2005	Sony Online Entertainment	LucasArts	
Star Wars: Battlefront II	PlayStation 2, PSP, Windows, Xbox	November 1, 2005	Pandemic Studios, Savage Entertainment	LucasArts	
Star Wars Galaxies: Trials of Obi-Wan	Windows	November 1, 2005	Sony Online Entertainment	LucasArts	
Star Wars: Empire at War	Mac, Windows	February 16, 2006	Petroglyph Games	LucasArts	
Lego Star Wars II: The Original Trilogy	Game Boy Advance, GameCube, Mac, mobile phone, Nintendo DS, PlayStation 2, PSP, Windows, Xbox, Xbox 360	September 12, 2006	Traveller's Tales, Robosoft Technologies	LucasArts	
Star Wars: Empire at War: Forces of Corruption	Windows	October 24, 2006	Petroglyph Games	LucasArts	
Star Wars: The Best of PC ^{C}	Windows	November 21, 2006	Raven Software, BioWare, Pandemic Studios, LucasArts, Petroglyph Games	LucasArts	
Thrillville	PlayStation 2, PSP, Xbox	November 21, 2006	Frontier Developments	LucasArts; Atari Europe	
Star Wars: Lethal Alliance	Nintendo DS, PlayStation Portable	December 7, 2006	Ubisoft Montreal	Ubisoft	
Star Wars: Imperial Ace	J2ME	2006	Fishlabs	THQ	
Star Wars Battlefront: Renegade Squadron	PSP	October 9, 2007	Rebellion Developments	LucasArts	
Thrillville: Off the Rails	Windows, Nintendo DS, PlayStation 2, PSP, Wii, Xbox 360	October 9, 2007	Frontier Developments, DC Studios (Nintendo DS version)	LucasArts	
Lego Star Wars: The Complete Saga	Nintendo DS, PlayStation 3, Wii, Windows, Xbox 360, Mac, iOS, Android	November 6, 2007	Traveller's Tales, Robosoft Technologies	LucasArts	
Lego Indiana Jones: The Original Adventures	Windows, Nintendo DS, PlayStation 2, PlayStation 3, PSP, Wii, Xbox 360, Mac	June 3, 2008	Traveller's Tales, Feral Interactive, Open Planet Software	LucasArts	
Star Wars Galaxies: Trading Card Game	Windows	August 27, 2008	Sony Online Entertainment	LucasArts	
Star Wars: The Force Unleashed	iOS, mobile phone, N-Gage, Nintendo DS, PlayStation 2, PlayStation 3, PSP, Wii, Xbox 360, Windows, Mac, Nintendo Switch	September 16, 2008	LucasArts, Krome Studios, N-Space, Universomo, Aspyr	LucasArts	
Fracture	PlayStation 3, Xbox 360	October 7, 2008	Day 1 Studios	LucasArts	
Star Wars: The Clone Wars – Jedi Alliance	Nintendo DS	November 11, 2008	Lucasfilm Animation Singapore	LucasArts	
Star Wars: The Clone Wars – Lightsaber Duels	Wii	November 11, 2008	Krome Studios	LucasArts	
Star Wars Battlefront: Mobile Squadrons	Mobile phone	April 2, 2009	THQ Wireless	THQ	
Indiana Jones and the Staff of Kings	Nintendo DS, PlayStation 2, PSP, Wii	June 9, 2009	Artificial Mind and Movement, Amaze Entertainment	LucasArts	
Tales of Monkey Island	Windows, Wii, Mac, PlayStation 3, iOS	July 7, 2009	Telltale Games	Telltale Games	
The Secret of Monkey Island: Special Edition	Windows, Mac, PlayStation 3, Xbox 360, iOS	July 15, 2009	LucasArts	LucasArts	
Star Wars: The Clone Wars – Republic Heroes	Windows, Xbox 360, PlayStation 3, Wii, PSP, PlayStation 2, Nintendo DS	October 6, 2009	Krome Studios, Lucasfilm Animation Singapore	LucasArts	
Lucidity	Windows, Xbox 360	October 7, 2009	LucasArts	LucasArts	
Star Wars Battlefront: Elite Squadron	PSP, Nintendo DS	November 3, 2009	Rebellion Developments, N-Space	LucasArts	
Lego Indiana Jones 2: The Adventure Continues	Windows, PlayStation 3, Wii, Xbox 360, Mac, Nintendo DS, PSP	November 17, 2009	Traveller's Tales, Feral Interactive, Open Planet Software	LucasArts	
Monkey Island 2 Special Edition: LeChuck's Revenge	Windows, Mac, PlayStation 3, Xbox 360, iOS	July 7, 2010	LucasArts	LucasArts	
Clone Wars Adventures	Windows, OS X	September 15, 2010	Sony Online Entertainment	Sony Online Entertainment, LucasArts	
Star Wars: The Force Unleashed II	iOS, Windows, Nintendo DS, PlayStation 3, Xbox 360, Wii	October 26, 2010	LucasArts, Aspyr, Red Fly Studio	LucasArts	
Lego Star Wars III: The Clone Wars	Windows, Nintendo 3DS, Nintendo DS, PlayStation 3, PSP, Wii, Xbox 360, Mac	March 22, 2011	Traveller's Tales	LucasArts	
Star Wars: The Old Republic	Windows	December 20, 2011	BioWare	Electronic Arts	
Kinect Star Wars	Xbox 360	April 3, 2012	Terminal Reality	LucasArts, Microsoft Studios	
Angry Birds Star Wars	Android, iOS, Nintendo 3DS, PlayStation 3, PlayStation Vita, Wii, Wii U, Windows, Xbox 360	November 8, 2012	Rovio Entertainment	Rovio Entertainment, LucasArts, Activision	
Angry Birds Star Wars II	Android, iOS, Windows Phone	September 18, 2013	Rovio Entertainment	Rovio Entertainment, LucasArts	
Star Wars: Tiny Death Star	Android, iOS, Windows Phone, Windows	October 11, 2013	Disney Mobile, NimbleBit	Disney Mobile, LucasArts	
Star Wars 1313	Windows, PlayStation 4, Xbox One	2013 (Cancelled)	LucasArts	LucasArts	
Disney Infinity 3.0	Windows, PlayStation 3, PlayStation 4, Xbox 360, Xbox One, Wii U, iOS, Android, Apple TV	August 28, 2015	Avalanche Software	Disney Interactive Studios	
Star Wars Battlefront	Windows, PlayStation 4, Xbox One	November 17, 2015	DICE	Electronic Arts	
Star Wars: Galaxy of Heroes	Android, iOS, iPadOS, Windows	November 24, 2015	EA Capital Games	Electronic Arts	
Lego Star Wars: The Force Awakens	Nintendo 3DS, PlayStation 3, PlayStation 4, PlayStation Vita, Wii U, Windows, Xbox 360, Xbox One, Mac, Android, iOS	June 28, 2016	TT Fusion	Warner Bros. Interactive Entertainment	
Star Wars Battlefront II	Windows, PlayStation 4, Xbox One	November 17, 2017	DICE	Electronic Arts	
Star Wars: Project Porg	Magic Leap	February 19, 2019	ILMxLAB	Disney Electronic Content	
Star Wars Jedi: Fallen Order	PlayStation 4, Windows, Xbox One, Stadia, PlayStation 5, Xbox Series X/S	November 15, 2019	Respawn Entertainment	Electronic Arts	
Star Wars: Squadrons	PlayStation 4, Windows, Xbox One, Xbox Series X/S	October 2, 2020	Motive Studio	Electronic Arts	
Lego Star Wars: Castaways	iOS, macOS, tvOS	November 19, 2021	Gameloft	Gameloft	
Lego Star Wars: The Skywalker Saga	Nintendo Switch, PlayStation 4, PlayStation 5, Windows, Xbox One, Xbox Series X/S	April 5, 2022	Traveller's Tales	Warner Bros. Games	
Return to Monkey Island	macOS, Nintendo Switch, Windows, Linux, PlayStation 5, Xbox Series X/S, iOS, Android	September 19, 2022	Terrible Toybox	Devolver Digital	
Star Wars Jedi: Survivor	PlayStation 5, Windows, Xbox Series X/S, PlayStation 4, Xbox One	April 28, 2023	Respawn Entertainment	Electronic Arts	
Star Wars: Hunters	Nintendo Switch, iOS, Android, Windows	June 4, 2024	BossAlien	Zynga	
Star Wars Outlaws	PlayStation 5, Windows, Xbox Series X/S	August 30, 2024	Massive Entertainment	Ubisoft	
Indiana Jones and the Great Circle	Windows, Xbox Series X/S, PlayStation 5	December 9, 2024	MachineGames	Bethesda Softworks	
Destiny 2: Renegades	Windows, Xbox One, Xbox Series X/S, PlayStation 4, PlayStation 5	December 2, 2025	Bungie	Bungie	
Disney SpellStruck	Apple Arcade	February 19, 2026	ArtistArcade	WordPlay Games LLC	
