= The Adventurer (magazine) =

Game magazine published 1990–1996

- Categories: Video game
- Publisher: LucasArts
- First issue: Fall 1990
- Final issue: Winter 1996
- Country: United States
- Based in: San Francisco
- Language: English

The Adventurer was a game magazine published by LucasArts from Fall 1990 to Winter 1996. Designed as a consumer-facing company newsletter, it promoted upcoming LucasArts releases and featured background information on their development in the form of essays and staff interviews. In addition to printed copies which were distributed free of charge, LucasArts also published selected articles on their website.

Despite the magazine's name, The Adventurer did not focus exclusively on adventure games, but covered all kinds of titles published by LucasArts.

== Issues ==
Over the course of the magazine's 6-year run, a total of 13 issues were released. Due to issue number 13 being skipped, the magazine's final issue was #14, published at the end of 1996.

| Issue # | Game featured on cover | Date |
|---|---|---|
| 1 | Secret Weapons of the Luftwaffe | Fall 1990 |
| 2 | Star Wars (NES) | Spring 1991 |
| 3 | Indiana Jones and the Fate of Atlantis | Fall 1991 |
| 4 | Star Wars: X-Wing | Spring 1992 |
| 5 | Day of the Tentacle | Fall 1992 |
| 6 | The Dig | Spring 1993 |
| 7 | Star Wars: TIE Fighter | Winter 1993/94 |
| 8 | Full Throttle | Summer 1994 |
| 9 | Star Wars: Dark Forces | Winter 1994/95 |
| 10 | Mortimer and the Riddles of the Medallion | Summer 1995 |
| 11 | Afterlife | Winter 1995/96 |
| 12 | Outlaws | Summer 1996 |
| 14 | Star Wars: Rebellion | Winter 1996/97 |
