= Totally Games =

American video game developer

- Type: Privately held
- Industry: Interactive entertainment
- Founded: 1994 (Totally Games 1995)
- Defunct: 2015; 11 years ago
- Headquarters: San Rafael, California
- Key people: Lawrence Holland, President; Robin Holland, Vice President
- Products: Flight simulators, space combat simulators
- Website: www.totallygames.com

Totally Games was an American video game developer based in Marin County, California. Their titles included the X-Wing series of games based on the Star Wars universe, a series of PC-based World War II flight combat simulations (Battlehawks 1942, Their Finest Hour: The Battle of Britain, and Secret Weapons of the Luftwaffe), and Bridge Commander, based on the Star Trek universe. They created Secret Weapons Over Normandy in 2003 for the PlayStation 2, Xbox, and Windows.

The company later broadened their scope to the PlayStation Portable and the Wii (Alien Syndrome) and an interconnected theme park/Internet experience, Buzz Lightyear Astro Blasters, commemorating the 50th anniversary of Disneyland. The company was originally founded in 1985 as a sole proprietorship, incorporated in 1993 as Peregrine Software, and soon thereafter renamed Totally Games by Lawrence Holland, a Cornell University graduate.

== History ==
Lawrence Holland began developing games in 1983, beginning with Spike's Peak, then Super Zaxxon and Project Space Station, with publisher HESWare. He went independent in 1985 and contracted with Lucasfilm Games to do the Apple II and Commodore 64 versions of naval simulations PHM Pegasus and its sequel Strike Fleet for publication by Electronic Arts. From this point, Holland proposed the design for Battlehawks 1942 and hired his own team while working closely with Lucasfilm Games. That small sole proprietorship was the precursor to Totally Games, which was incorporated in 1993 as Peregrine Software and renamed Totally Games in 1994.

Totally Games changed its business model in October 2008 to a virtual model and continued developing innovative projects beyond the traditional game publishing environment. Lawrence Holland continues to design games and related software, working with a close-knit team developing on traditional and new platforms including the web, iPhone, and social media platforms.

== List of games ==
- Battlehawks 1942 (1988)
- Their Finest Hour: The Battle of Britain (1989)
- Secret Weapons of the Luftwaffe (1991)
- Star Wars: X-Wing (1993)
- Star Wars: TIE Fighter (1994)
- Star Wars: X-Wing vs. TIE Fighter (1997)
- Star Wars: X-Wing Collector Series (1998)
- Star Wars: X-Wing Alliance (1999)
- Star Trek: Bridge Commander (2002)
- Knights of Decayden (2002; cancelled)
- Secret Weapons Over Normandy (2003)
- Buzz Lightyear Astro Blasters (2005)
- Special project for DARPA (2006)
- Alien Syndrome (2007)
- Dora the Explorer: Dora Saves the Mermaids (2008)
- PBR: Out of the Chute (2008)
- Cisco Mind Share Game (2009; for Cisco Systems)
- Oceanis (2009; downloadable PC game with Nickelodeon)
- GoldWalker (2010; iPhone)
- Beachtown (2011; Facebook)
