= Battlehawk =

Battlehawk may refer to:

- The Battlehawks, a fictional fighter squadron in the video game Secret Weapons Over Normandy
- Battlehawks 1942, a video game
- The Battlehawk, a fictional aircraft carrier featured in the television series Terrahawks
- Battle Hawk, a Japanese television series
- Battlehawk, a drone capable of being backpack carried, directed to targets, and delivering explosives
- St. Louis Battlehawks, professional American football team competing in the United Football League
