= Lawrence Holland =

American video game designer

- Occupation: Video game designer
- Known for: Star Wars: X-Wing series

Lawrence Holland is an American video game designer and founder of the now defunct Totally Games. He is best known for the Star Wars: X-Wing series published by LucasArts.

In 2009, he was chosen by IGN as one of the top 100 game creators of all time.

== Early life ==
His interest in computer programming started when his college roommate attempted to program a game onto his computer. After buying his own computer, Lawrence Holland studied to figure out how the computer worked and began his career in game design. In 1983, Holland was hired by Human Engineered Software (HESware) to program and convert arcade games to home computers. He started his own team, Micro Imagery, while working with HESware in 1984. During this time, he invented his own game and composed/programmed music for numerous video games.

== Career ==
His first game was called Slime for the VIC-20. He went on to do the music for the Commodore 64 and Apple II versions of The Bard's Tale.

Other early games include Spike's Peak, Super Zaxxon and Project Space Station.

He became an independent game developer, and achieved notability through a series of World War II flight simulators developed for LucasArts (then LucasFilm Games): Battlehawks 1942, Their Finest Hour and Secret Weapons of the Luftwaffe.

The success of his World War II flight simulators lead to him being approached to develop a series of space flight simulators in the Star Wars franchise. The resulting game Star Wars: X-Wing, followed by Star Wars: TIE Fighter, Star Wars: X-Wing vs. TIE Fighter and Star Wars: X-Wing Alliance.

Holland took a break from LucasArts owned licenses in 2002 to work on a Star Trek licensed product Star Trek: Bridge Commander for Activision. His next release was a return to World War II flight simulators with Secret Weapons Over Normandy in 2003. The game was well received but sales were disappointing. His most recent release, 2007's Alien Syndrome, for the Sony PSP and the Nintendo Wii, was met with negative reception and sales.

=== Games ===
Name	Year	Credited with	Publisher
Spike's Peak	1984	designer	HesWare
Super Zaxxon (C64 port)	1984	programmer	HesWare
Project Space Station	1985	designer	HesWare
The Bard's Tale	1985	composer	Interplay Productions
PHM Pegasus (Apple II version)	1986	programmer	Lucasfilm Games
Strike Fleet	1988	designer, programmer	Lucasfilm Games
Battlehawks 1942	1988	director, designer, programmer	Lucasfilm Games
Their Finest Hour	1989	director, designer, programmer	Lucasfilm Games
Secret Weapons of the Luftwaffe	1991	director, programmer	Lucasfilm Games
Secret Weapons of the Luftwaffe: P-80 Shooting Star	1991	designer, programmer	Lucasfilm Games
Secret Weapons of the Luftwaffe: P-38 Lightning	1991	designer	Lucasfilm Games
Secret Weapons of the Luftwaffe: He 162 Volksjäger	1992	designer, programmer	Lucasfilm Games
Secret Weapons of the Luftwaffe: Do 335 Pfeil	1992	designer, programmer	Lucasfilm Games
Star Wars: X-Wing	1993	director, producer, designer, programmer	LucasArts
Star Wars: X-Wing – Imperial Pursuit	1993	director, producer, designer, programmer	LucasArts
Star Wars: X-Wing – B-Wing	1993	director, producer, designer, programmer	LucasArts
Star Wars: X-Wing – Collector's CD-ROM	1994	director, producer, designer, programmer	LucasArts
Star Wars: TIE Fighter	1994	director, designer, programmer	LucasArts
Star Wars: TIE Fighter – Defender of the Empire	1994	director, designer, programmer	LucasArts
Star Wars: TIE Fighter – Collector's CD-ROM	1995	director, designer, programmer	LucasArts
Star Wars: X-Wing vs. TIE Fighter	1997	director	LucasArts
Star Wars: X-Wing vs. TIE Fighter – Balance of Power	1997	executive director	LucasArts
Star Wars: X-Wing Alliance	1999	director, programmer	LucasArts
Star Trek: Bridge Commander	2002	creative director	Activision
Secret Weapons Over Normandy	2003	director, creative director	LucasArts
NBA	2005	audio programmer	Sony Computer Entertainment
Alien Syndrome	2007	creative director	Sega
Dora the Explorer: Dora Saves the Mermaids	2008	creative director	2K Play
PBR: Out of the Chute	2008	director	Crave Entertainment, D2C Games
Oceanis	2010	designer, programmer	Shockwave
