= Swon =

Swon may refer to:

- The Swon Brothers, Colton and Zach Swon, singers
- SWON, video game
