= Star Trek: Bridge Commander =

2002 video game

- Developer: Totally Games
- Publisher: Activision
- Directors: David Litwin; Lawrence Holland (creative)
- Producer: Parker A. Davis
- Designer: Bill Morrison
- Programmers: David Litwin; Erik Novales
- Artist: Armand Cabrera
- Composer: Danny Pelfrey
- Series: Star Trek
- Engine: Gamebryo
- Platform: Windows
- Release: NA: February 28, 2002; EU: March 8, 2002
- Genre: Space combat simulator
- Modes: Single-player, multiplayer

Star Trek: Bridge Commander is a space combat simulation video game for Windows, developed by Totally Games and published by Activision in 2002, based in the Star Trek universe.

The plot revolves around a newly promoted captain who is assigned to investigate an explosion of a star in the Maelstrom. Throughout the mystery, the player will encounter characters from the Star Trek universe, including Captain Picard and Commander Data. The captain and his crew take command of the Galaxy-class USS Dauntless (NCC-71879) as well as the USS Sovereign (NCC-73811) to combat a new threat to the United Federation of Planets.

The game allows two different styles of gameplay: storyline mode and quick battle mode. Quick battle mode allows for customized scenarios within a "simulated" environment, allowing the player to pick their allies/enemies, system, etc. With the advent of modding for Bridge Commander, custom missions and campaigns have been made possible through this engine.

Voices for the game were provided by Patrick Stewart and Brent Spiner, reprising their roles from the series.

Star Trek: Bridge Commander was a critical success upon release and is frequently listed among the greatest Star Trek games of all time.

== Gameplay ==
Main game screen, viewing from bridge

There are several gameplay modes in Bridge Commander, with the main two means of control being the bridge view and the tactical view. While the bridge view has the player control the movements of the ship by interacting with members of the bridge crew, the tactical view changes to an external view allows the player to have direct control over the starship. A variety of shortcut keys work in the same manner in both modes. Additional modes in the game include the map mode and the cinematic mode, which removes the interface from being displayed and also switches to an external view of the ship.

In the bridge view, most game functions are carried out by selecting an individual bridge officer, and selecting from a set of commands or options in order to control that individual's set of responsibilities. In this way, the game simulates being in command of a starship. For example, a player could issue the command to intercept a fleeing starship through the Helm menu, or order Lt. Felix Savali, the tactical officer to destroy an enemy ship. An artificial intelligence would then pilot the ship for the player.

Bridge Commander incorporates a Quick Battle mode which is a combat simulation that allows the player to control any ship encountered during the course of the game. There is also a selection of a system which on rare occasions, incorporates their own unique hazards. Multiplayer allows for a maximum of 8 players over the internet to compete in one of four modes; Deathmatch, Team Deathmatch, UFP vs Non-UFP Deathmatch and Defend the Starbase.

Players also have the option to switch to an external ship view, and carry out many piloting and weapons functions themselves. In this view, they are able to view various tactical indicators.

== Storyline ==
The USS Dauntless is in orbit of planet Vesuvi IV. Her captain, Robert Wright, is piloting a shuttle to a research station orbiting the planet when the star goes supernova, destroying the planet, killing the captain, and severely damaging the Dauntless. After several months of repairs and refits, the Dauntless' first officer becomes her new captain, and after a brief resupply mission to the surviving Vesuvi colonies, an investigation into the star's destruction begins.

The Dauntless crew is later given the USS Sovereign, the USS Enterprise-E's sister ship, for the investigation. They also undergo a shakedown cruise to check for bugs in the ship's systems which results in a simulated battle against the USS Geronimo and two Birds of Prey. Additionally, Lieutenant Commander Data from the Enterprise is temporarily assigned to the Sovereign to assist in the investigation. Initial hostilities with the Romulans briefly lead the crew to suspect them as the culprits, but further evidence reveals a renegade faction of Cardassians are responsible. They are led by Legate Matan, the game's central villain.

Matan is assisted by a new race of aliens called the Kessok whom Matan exploited and lied to in order to gain their cooperation. While searching for the technology that destroyed the Vesuvi star in the Alioth system, the Sovereign is ambushed and forced to leave Data behind on the surface of the system's sixth planet.

The revelation of the Cardassians' responsibility for the destruction of the Vesuvi star leads to a full-scale war between the Federation and Matan's faction. The Federation is at first at a disadvantage, having underestimated Matan's forces; however, they are able to repel an offensive against Starbase 12 and destroy Litvok Nor, a Cardassian space station identical to Deep Space 9, and rescue Data. Additionally, a Federation–Klingon–Romulan alliance is formed to put an end to the war in the game's final missions.

Shortly after Data's rescue and the formation of the alliance, the Sovereign is ordered to destroy the remaining Kessok technology that destroyed the Vesuvi star. During an encounter with a Kessok heavy cruiser, which makes no hostile movements and is unshielded, the player is presented with a choice: destroy the Kessok ship and the remaining device or hail it. If the player fires on the Kessok ship, two smaller vessels will de-cloak and assist the heavy cruiser. The final mission will also be more difficult as the Kessok forces will initially side with the Cardassians. Hailing the vessel will open a dialog with the Kessok and reveal the Cardassians' exploitation of them.

The game's final mission involves destroying the remaining Kessok device in the custody of Matan before he can use it to destroy a newly founded Kessok colony. The final confrontation with Matan occurs near the star of the Omega Draconis system. The game ends with Matan's ship falling into the star and the beginnings of formal diplomatic relations with the Kessok. Captain Picard wishes the player good luck on their journeys, and the Sovereign warps away.

== Development ==
In late 1998, publishers Activision made contact with Totally Games for the start of development of Bridge Commander. Employees working for Totally Games spent six months on research, design and testing to keep the game within the bounds of the Star Trek universe. At E3 2001, the multiplayer mode originally to be included was dropped in favour of single-player. This announcement was reversed several days later.

In September 2021, the game was one of six Star Trek titles re-released on GoG.com in celebration of the franchise's 55th anniversary.

== Reception ==
Reception

Aggregate score
Aggregator	Score
Metacritic	82/100

Review scores
Publication	Score
Computer Games Magazine	4.5/5
Computer Gaming World	4/5
Edge	7/10
Game Informer	7/10
GameRevolution	B
GameSpot	8.2/10
GameSpy	85%
GameZone	8.8/10
IGN	9/10
PC Gamer (US)	72%
Entertainment Weekly	A−

Star Trek: Bridge Commander received "favorable" reviews according to the review aggregation website Metacritic. GameSpot named the game a runner-up for its March 2002 "PC Game of the Month" award. The publication later presented the game with its annual "Best Sci-Fi Simulation Game on PC" award.

Ivan Sulic of IGN said that Bridge Commander was "the single most engaging Star Trek experience yet in gaming" and the "undisputed king of all that is starship combat", but appreciated that some players may feel that it isn't as nonlinear as they might like. He added that the missions were well paced, although he complained of the difficulty of a stealth based level.

In 2009, Kotaku ranked Bridge Commander as one of the top three Star Trek games. In 2016, Tom's Guide ranked Bridge Commander as one of the top ten Star Trek games. In 2017, PC Gamer ranked Bridge Commander among the best Star Trek games. In 2020, Screen Rant ranked Bridge Commander as the fifth best Star Trek game. In 2023, Space.com ranked Bridge Commander as the second best Star Trek game.
