= Indiana Jones' Greatest Adventures =

1994 video game

- US cover art
- Developers: Factor 5, LucasArts
- Publishers: JVC Musical Industries, LucasArts
- Producer: Julian Eggebrecht
- Designers: Kalani Streicher; Thomas Engel; Julian Eggebrecht; Willi Bäcker
- Programmer: Thomas Engel
- Artists: Frank Matzke; Jon Knoles; William V. Tiller; Andreas Escher; Ramiro Vaca
- Composer: Rudolf Stember
- Platform: Super Nintendo Entertainment System
- Release: NA: October 1994; EU: March 30, 1995; JP: July 28, 1995
- Genre: Platform
- Mode: Single-player

Indiana Jones' Greatest Adventures is a 1994 platform video game released for the Super Nintendo Entertainment System. It is a video game adaptation of the Indiana Jones films Raiders of the Lost Ark (1981), Indiana Jones and the Temple of Doom (1984), and Indiana Jones and the Last Crusade (1989). The game was developed by Factor 5 and published by JVC Musical Industries. The story is told through cutscenes and text and is mostly faithful to the movies. Its release coincided with that of Super Star Wars: Return of the Jedi, also released by JVC and LucasArts and in the same platform style as the Super Star Wars trilogy.

== Gameplay ==
Indy fights Walter Donovan's skeleton.

The game is primarily action based, and the player controls Indiana Jones through levels based on events of the films. Jones's main method of attack is his bull-whip, but he can also damage enemies by punching or rolling into them. Occasionally a gun can be found that has unlimited ammo, and grenades are available in limited numbers. Besides attacking, the whip can also be used as a method of swinging across pits. Once in a while, the game breaks the mold from the typical action and plunges the player into various other types of gameplay, such as flying a plane, riding a mine cart, and going down a mountain on a raft.

Indiana Jones' Greatest Adventures uses the same engine as the Super Star Wars series and is divided into 28 areas, many of them in side-scrolling view and others in driving stages. If Indy dies in an area, the player restarts from the beginning of the current area or at the last checkpoint. All three of the movies are featured in the game, but Raiders of the Lost Ark is the only one playable upon starting the game. In order to play Temple of Doom and Last Crusade, the player must progress through the game or use a password.

== Release ==
A Sega Genesis/Mega Drive conversion was reported by Electronic Gaming Monthly to be 100% complete and reviewed in gaming magazines. Like many third-party titles near the end of the Genesis/Mega Drive's lifecycle, the game was shelved and was never released. A prototype of the Genesis/Mega Drive version was sold on eBay for GB£770.00. In 2017, Factor 5 co-founder Julian Eggebrecht said that the Genesis/Mega Drive port was left unpublished due to U.S. Gold ceasing operations.

== Reception ==
Reception

Aggregate score
| Aggregator | Score |
|---|---|
| GameRankings | 75.13% |

Review scores
| Publication | Score |
|---|---|
| Computer and Video Games | 82/100 |
| Electronic Gaming Monthly | 8/10, 7/10, 6/10, 7/10 |
| Famitsu | 5/10, 7/10, 8/10, 5/10 |
| Game Informer | 7.75/10 |
| Game Players | 84% |
| GamesMaster | 79% |
| Hyper | 78/100 |
| Nintendo Power | 3.525/5 |
| Official Nintendo Magazine | 85/100 |
| Super Play | 29% |
| Total! | (UK) 75/100 (DE) 2 |
| Electronic Games | B |
| Games World | 85/100 |
| Super Gamer | 82/100 |
| Ultimate Future Games | 79% |
| VideoGames | 9/10 |

According to Famitsu, Indiana Jones' Greatest Adventures sold 26,272 copies during its lifetime in Japan. The game received generally favorable reception, holding a rating of 75.13% based on four reviews according to review aggregator GameRankings.

Computer and Video Games praised the graphics and sound, but also opined that the game "doesn't break any new ground", stating that it "packs a great challenge but with few surprises". GamePro described it as a decent though unexceptional side-scroller. They cited the game's faithful recreation of the scenery and enemies of the films as its strongest point, but found that the graphics are inconsistent, the music is excellent but stays the same through most of the game, and the stages are far too easy. The four reviewers of Electronic Gaming Monthly contradicted this, saying that the game is extremely challenging, with two of them adding that it suffers from frequent unavoidable hits. However, they praised the game's graphics, especially the Mode 7 effects, and gave it a score of 7 out of 10.

In 2008, Levi Buchanan of IGN included it on his list of top 10 Indiana Jones games, calling it "a great platformer that delivers real challenge as well as faithful adherence to the heart and soul of each film". Buchanan praised the music and graphics: "The recreation of the classic themes is fantastic and the looping never waters down their effectiveness. [...] The sprite work is solid, the Mode 7 stuff is well done, and lots of great color choices really bring the game to life". The game was re-released for the Wii in 2009, as a Virtual Console (VC) game. This version was reviewed by Marcel van Duyn of Nintendo Life, who praised the graphics and music. Van Duyn considered it one of the best Indiana Jones games ever.

Reviewing the SNES version in 2011, Jeuxvideo.com praised its graphics and music. In 2021, Gerald Lynch of TechRadar included it on a list of the best Indiana Jones games ever, while calling it "brutally hard". In 2018, Complex rated the game 55th in their "The Best Super Nintendo Games of All Time".

== See also ==
- List of LucasArts games
