= Alien Syndrome (2007 video game) =

- Developer: Totally Games
- Publisher: Sega
- Director: Lawrence Holland
- Series: Alien Syndrome
- Engine: Vicious Engine
- Platforms: PlayStation Portable, Wii
- Release: NA: July 24, 2007; EU: September 7, 2007; AU: September 13, 2007
- Genres: Action role-playing, multi-directional shooter
- Modes: Single-player, multiplayer

Alien Syndrome is a video game by Totally Games, part of the Alien Syndrome franchise created by Sega. It was released for the PlayStation Portable and Wii in 2007. This iteration takes place a century after the previous game and introduces role-playing elements to the gameplay.

== Plot ==
The story picks up approximately 100 years after the original Alien Syndrome. The title is set in the far future, where interplanetary space travel is possible. Communication is lost with one of the stations on a distant planet, the Kronos, and Aileen Harding is sent to investigate. She quickly discovers that Alien Syndrome is behind the disappearance and decides to fight the enemy and find out what happened to her boyfriend Tom.

== Gameplay ==
Alien Syndrome is played as a top-down shooter, with players turning their characters the direction they would like to shoot. The game has 40 levels, with 5 bosses and 15 mini-bosses. Players customize their character to expand in-game strategy options.

Alien Syndrome has 80 different weapons to use and hundreds of armor types as well as bonus items. Players are accompanied by a robotic drone (SCARAB) that serves as a storage space for items as well as a backup for the main character. As a constant companion, SCARAB can assist in fights and grant on-demand access to the character's cache of weapons and armors. Players have both a life meter and a constantly refilling energy meter, with the latter reflecting shield power.

The game also features co-op multiplayer for up to 4 people on one screen for the Wii version. On the PSP version, the game features co-op multiplayer via a WiFi connection.

On the PSP, player movement and aiming use the analog stick; while a player is firing a ranged weapon, her facing is locked. On the Wii, movement is handled by the analog stick on the Nunchuk, while aiming is controlled by pointing with the Wii Remote.

The Wii version emphasizes use of the Wiimote. Tilting the Nunchuk rotates the screen to change orientation. In addition, motion control-based minigames are available to the player to increase stats via DNA augmentation chambers found in various levels, defeat lock protection on golden chests with guided nanites to procure items with a variety of attributes as well as loot, and disinfect rare items afflicted by the Alien Syndrome with charged nanites to restore their attributes.

== Reception ==
Reception

Aggregate score
Aggregator	Score	
Aggregator	PSP	Wii
Metacritic	51/100	48/100

Review scores
Publication	Score	
Publication	PSP	Wii
1Up.com	D	C−
Eurogamer	4/10	N/A
Game Informer	N/A	6.25/10
GameSpot	5/10	5/10
GameSpy	2.5/5	2.5/5
IGN	6/10	5.5/10
Nintendo Power	N/A	6/10
Nintendo World Report	N/A	3.5/10
Pocket Gamer	3/5	N/A
PlayStation: The Official Magazine	5/10	N/A
RPGamer	N/A	2/5
RPGFan	83%	N/A
411Mania	2/10	3/10

The PSP version received "mixed" reviews, while the Wii version received "generally unfavorable reviews", according to the review aggregation website Metacritic. GamePro called the PSP version "a flawed game with too many quirks to recommend. It's a passable single-player experience but if you can find some friends to play with, it just might help you kill an hour or two here and there." (Note: GamePro gave the PSP version two 2/5 scores for graphics and sound, and two 2.5/5 scores for control and fun factor.)
