= Lucasfilm Games =

American video game company

- Formerly: LucasArts Entertainment Company, LLC (1990–2021)
- Type: Subsidiary
- Industry: Video games
- Founded: May 1, 1982; 44 years ago
- Founder: George Lucas
- Headquarters: San Francisco, California, US
- Area served: Worldwide
- Key people: Douglas Reilly (vice president, games)
- Number of employees: 10 (2013)
- Parent: Disney Games Group
- Website: lucasfilm.com/what-we-do/games/

Lucasfilm Games, formerly known as LucasArts (1990–2021), is the video game licensing division of Lucasfilm, operating under the Disney Games Group of The Walt Disney Company. It was previously a video game developer and publisher. Founded by George Lucas in May 1982 as Lucasfilm's video game development division, it was renamed LucasArts following a corporate reorganization in 1990. The studio became known for its adventure games developed using the SCUMM engine, including Maniac Mansion, the Monkey Island series, and several Indiana Jones titles. Notable developers associated with the studio included Brian Moriarty, Tim Schafer, Ron Gilbert, and Dave Grossman. During the late 1990s and early 2000s, LucasArts increasingly focused on action-oriented games based on the Star Wars franchise, gradually moving away from adventure games as interest in the genre declined.

Following The Walt Disney Company's acquisition of Lucasfilm in December 2012, Disney discontinued LucasArts' internal game development in April 2013, shifting the division to a licensing model focused on partnerships with third-party developers. Some employees transferred to Disney Interactive Studios, while a smaller team remained to manage licensing agreements, including a major partnership with Electronic Arts (EA) for Star Wars games. In January 2021, Disney revived the original Lucasfilm Games name as the official brand for video games based on Lucasfilm properties, continuing its focus on licensing and collaboration with external developers. In 2026, Lucasfilm Games became part of the newly consolidated Disney Games Group, alongside Disney & Pixar Games, Marvel Games and 20th Century Games.

== History ==
=== Early history ===
In 1979, George Lucas wanted to explore other areas of entertainment and created the Lucasfilm Computer Division in 1979, which included a department for computer games (the Games Group) and another for graphics. The graphics department was spun off into its own corporation in 1986, ultimately becoming Pixar.

The Lucasfilm Games Group originally cooperated with Atari, Inc., which helped fund the video game group's founding, to produce video games. Though the group had spun out of Lucasfilm, the video game development license for Lucasfilm's Star Wars was held by Atari at the time, forcing the group to start with original concepts; Ron Gilbert, one of the group's first employees, believed that if the Lucasfilm Games Group had the rights for Star Wars from the start, they would have never branched into any new intellectual property.

The first products from the Games Group were Ballblazer and Rescue on Fractalus!, developed in 1984 for the Atari 5200 console and Atari 8-bit computers. Beta versions of both games were leaked to pirate bulletin boards exactly one week after Atari had received unprotected copies for a marketing review, and were in wide circulation over a year before the original release date. Planned to be released in the 3rd quarter of 1984 under the Atari/Lucasfilm label, the games were delayed when Warner Communications sold the assets of the consumer division of Atari, Inc. to Jack Tramiel in July of that year, and were ultimately picked up by publisher Epyx and released by May 1985. Lucasfilm's next two games were Koronis Rift and The Eidolon. Their first games were only developed by Lucasfilm, and a publisher would distribute the games. Atari published their games for Atari systems, Activision and Epyx would do their computer publishing. Maniac Mansion was the first game to be published and developed by Lucasfilm Games.

The early charter of Lucasfilm Games was to make experimental, innovative, and technologically advanced video games. Habitat, an early online role-playing game and one of the first to support a graphical front-end, was one such title. It was only released as a beta test in 1986 by Quantum Link, an online service for the Commodore 64. Quantum Link could not provide the bandwidth at the time to support the game, so the full Habitat was never released outside of the beta test. However, Lucasfilm Games recouped the cost of development by releasing a sized-down version called Club Caribe in 1988. Lucasfilm later licensed the software to Fujitsu, who released it in Japan as Fujitsu Habitat in 1990. Fujitsu later licensed Habitat for world-wide distribution, and released an updated version called WorldsAway in 1995. The latest iteration of Habitat is still called WorldsAway, which can be found at MetroWorlds.

Initially, the Games Group worked from Lucas' Skywalker Ranch near Nicasio, California. In 1990, in a reorganization of the Lucas companies, the Games Division of Lucasfilm became part of the newly created LucasArts Entertainment Company, which also comprised Industrial Light & Magic and Skywalker Sound. Later ILM and Skywalker Sound were consolidated in Lucas Digital Ltd. and LucasArts became the official name of the former Games Division. During this, the division had moved out of Skywalker Ranch to near-by offices in San Rafael, California. Also in 1990, LucasArts started to publish The Adventurer, their own gaming magazine where one could read about their upcoming games and interviews with the developers. The final issue was published in 1996. In the same year, Lucas Learning was created as a subsidiary of LucasArts, providing educational software for classrooms.

=== iMUSE ===
iMUSE (Interactive MUsic Streaming Engine) is an interactive music system used in a number of LucasArts video games. It synchronizes music with the visual action in the game, and transitions from one musical theme to another. iMUSE was developed in the early 1990s by composers Michael Land and Peter McConnell while working at LucasArts. The iMUSE system is patented by LucasArts, and was added to the SCUMM game engine in 1991. The first game to use iMUSE was Monkey Island 2: LeChuck's Revenge and it has been used in all LucasArts adventure games since. It has also been used for some non-adventure LucasArts titles, including Star Wars: X-Wing (DOS version), Star Wars: TIE Fighter (DOS version), and Star Wars: Dark Forces.

=== Action side-scrolling games ===
Lucasfilm Games also released several side-scrollers during the Lucasarts era, focusing primarily on run and gun gameplay. A trilogy of games under the name of Super Star Wars for the SNES, with each game based on each of the three films from the Star Wars original trilogy: Super Star Wars (1992), Super Star Wars: The Empire Strikes Back (1993) and Super Star Wars: Return of the Jedi (1994). An Indiana Jones game based on the first three films of the franchise titled Indiana Jones' Greatest Adventures (1994) was developed alongside Factor 5, the first of many joint collaborations between the two studios. They also released some games not based on their existing IPs. Zombies Ate My Neighbors (1993) and its sequel Ghoul Patrol (1994) were overhead run and gun side-scrollers inspired by classic 1950s Horror B-movies. A spiritual successor called Herc's Adventures was released in 1997 and was inspired by Greek mythology. Metal Warriors (1995), a side-scroller inspired by mecha anime, and Big Sky Trooper were also developed using the same engine as Zombies Ate My Neighbors. Though these games sold poorly, they later garnered a cult following and are now considered to be Cult Classics from the 16-Bit era.

=== Adventure games ===
The first adventure game developed by Lucasfilm Games was Labyrinth in 1986, based on the Lucasfilm movie of the same name. The 1987 title Maniac Mansion introduced SCUMM, the scripting language behind most of the company's later adventure offerings. The adventures released in the following years, such as Zak McKracken and the Alien Mindbenders in 1988, Indiana Jones and the Last Crusade: The Graphic Adventure in 1989, and the 1990 titles Loom and The Secret of Monkey Island helped Lucasfilm Games build a reputation as one of the leading developers in the genre. The original five adventure games created with SCUMM were released in a compilation titled LucasArts Classic Adventures in 1992.

LucasArts was often referred to as one of the two big names in the field, competing with Sierra On-line as a developer of high quality adventures. The first half of the 1990s was the heyday for the company's adventure fame, with classic titles such as Monkey Island 2: LeChuck's Revenge in 1991, Indiana Jones and the Fate of Atlantis in 1992, Maniac Mansion: Day of the Tentacle and Sam & Max Hit the Road in 1993, and the 1995 titles Full Throttle and The Dig.

In the latter half of the decade, the popularity of adventure games faded and the costs associated with game development increased as high-resolution art and C.D.-quality audio became standard fare. The PC market wanted titles that would show off expensive new graphics cards to best effect, a change replicated in the home console market as the 3D capabilities of the PlayStation, Sega Saturn and Nintendo 64 dictated the nature of the majority of games produced for those platforms. The adventure genre failed to find popularity with the masses of new gamers.

Despite their declining popularity, LucasArts still continued to release adventure titles. In 1997, The Curse of Monkey Island, the last LucasArts adventure game to retain traditional two-dimensional graphics and point-and-click interface, was released. This was followed by Grim Fandango in 1998, LucasArts' first attempt to convert a 2D adventure to a 3D environment. The highly stylised visuals, outstanding soundtrack, superb voice acting and sophisticated writing earned Grim Fandango many plaudits, including GameSpot's Game of the Year award. Escape from Monkey Island (2000), the fourth installment in the Monkey Island series, featured the same control scheme as Grim Fandango, and was generally well received. It is the last original adventure game the company has released.

Two sequels to existing franchises, Full Throttle: Hell on Wheels and Sam & Max: Freelance Police, were announced to be in development but these projects were cancelled, in 2003 and 2004 respectively, before the games were finished. When the rights to the Sam & Max franchise expired in 2005, the creator of Sam & Max, Steve Purcell, regained ownership. He then licensed Sam & Max to Telltale Games to be developed into an episodic game. Telltale Games was made up primarily of former LucasArts employees who had worked on the Sam & Max sequel and were let go after the project was canceled.

LucasArts halted adventure game development for the next five years, focusing instead on their Star Wars games. They remained silent and did not rerelease their old games on digital distribution platforms, as other studios were doing at the time. However, in 2002, the company pledged that at least 50% of its releases would have nothing to do with Star Wars. It was not until 2009 that they returned to the genre. On June 1, 2009, LucasArts announced both The Secret of Monkey Island Special Edition, a high-definition remake of the original game with revised graphics, music and voice work, and Tales of Monkey Island, a new episodic installment in the Monkey Island series that was developed by Telltale Games. On July 6, 2009, they announced that they would be rereleasing a number of their classic games, including Indiana Jones and the Fate of Atlantis and LOOM, on Steam. The rereleases were, for the first time, native versions built for Microsoft Windows. This was the first time in many years that the studio had offered any support for its classic adventure titles.

The second game in the Monkey Island series also received a high-definition remake, entitled Monkey Island 2: LeChuck's Revenge Special Edition in 2010. Both Monkey Island special edition games were released in a compilation, Monkey Island Special Edition Collection, exclusively in Europe in 2011. The release of the unofficial SCUMM virtual machine, ScummVM, has led to a resurgence for LucasArts adventure games among present-day gamers. Using ScummVM, legacy adventure titles can easily be run on modern computers and even more unusual platforms such as video game consoles, mobile phones and PDAs.

=== Simulation games ===
In the late 1980s and early 1990s, Lucasfilm Games developed a series of military vehicle simulation games, the first of which were the naval simulations PHM Pegasus in 1986 and Strike Fleet in 1987. These two titles were published by Electronic Arts for a variety of computer platforms, including IBM PC compatibles, Commodore 64 and Apple II.

In 1988, Battlehawks 1942 launched a trilogy of World War II air combat simulations, giving the player a chance to fly as an American or Japanese pilot in the Pacific Theater. Battlehawks 1942 was followed by Their Finest Hour: The Battle of Britain in 1989, recreating the battle between the Luftwaffe and RAF for Britain's air supremacy. The trilogy ended with Secret Weapons of the Luftwaffe in 1991, in which the player could choose to fly on either the American or German side. The trilogy was lauded for its historical accuracy and detailed supplementary material—Secret Weapons of the Luftwaffe, for instance, was accompanied by a 224-page historical manual. The World War II trilogy was released with cover art by illustrator Marc Ericksen, in a compilation titled Air Combat Classics in 1994.

The World War II trilogy was created by a team led by Lawrence Holland, a game designer who later founded Totally Games. Totally Games would continue to develop games almost exclusively to LucasArts for a decade, with the most noted outcome of the symbiosis being the X-Wing series. They were also responsible for LucasArts' 2003 return to the aerial battles of World War II with Secret Weapons Over Normandy, a title released on PlayStation 2, Xbox and PC. In 1996, LucasArts released Afterlife, a simulator in which players build their own Heaven and Hell, with several jokes and puns (such as a prison in Hell called San Quentin Tarantino).

=== First Star Wars games ===
Even though LucasArts had created games based on other Lucasfilm properties before (Labyrinth, Indiana Jones), they did not use the Star Wars license until the early 1990s, as it had been held by Broderbund before reverting to Lucasfilm in 1992. The first in-house development was the space combat simulator X-Wing, developed by Larry Holland's independent team, which went on to spawn a successful series. The CD-ROM-only Star Wars game Rebel Assault became one of the biggest successes of the company and was considered a killer app for CD-ROM drives in the early 1990s.

=== First-person shooters ===
After the unprecedented success of id Software's Doom, the PC gaming market shifted towards production of three-dimensional first person shooters. LucasArts contributed to this trend with the 1995 release of Star Wars: Dark Forces, a first person shooter that successfully transplanted the Doom formula to a Star Wars setting. The Dark Forces Strategy guide claims that development was well underway before Doom was released and that the game was pushed back once Doom hit shelves so that it could be polished. The game was well received and spawned a new franchise: the Jedi Knight games. This began with the sequel to Dark Forces, Jedi Knight: Dark Forces II released in 1997; this game reflected the changing face of PC gaming, being one of the first games to appreciably benefit when used in conjunction with a dedicated 3D graphics card like 3dfx's Voodoo range. The game received an expansion pack, Mysteries of the Sith, in 1998 and a full sequel in 2002 with Star Wars Jedi Knight II: Jedi Outcast. 2003's Star Wars Jedi Knight: Jedi Academy can be seen as a spin-off from the series, but was less well received by reviewers, who complained that the franchise was becoming formulaic. Apart from Star Wars-themed 3D shooters, LucasArts also created the western-themed game Outlaws in 1997 and Armed and Dangerous (in collaboration with Planet Moon Studios) in 2003.

=== In the new millennium ===
In 2000, Simon Jeffery became the LucasArts president. He was president of LucasArts until 2003 and some successful Star Wars games released during his management like Star Wars Jedi Knight 2: Jedi Outcast, Star Wars Rogue Squadron 2, Knights of the Old Republic, Star Wars Jedi Academy and Star Wars Galaxies. Development of some other successful Star Wars Games began during his management, like Star Wars Republic Commando and Star Wars Battlefront.

In April 2000, LucasArts signed a two-year international distribution deal with Activision for over 45 territories across the world including the United Kingdom. The company previously signed a two-year deal with Activision for distribution in select European territories in April 1998. The deal was extended in May 2003 and renewed again in March 2009.

In 2002, LucasArts recognized that the over-reliance on Star Wars was reducing the quality of its output, and announced that future releases would be at least 50% non-Star Wars-related. However, many of the original titles were either unsuccessful or even cancelled before release, and since then LucasArts again had mainly Star Wars titles in production. Also in 2002, LucasArts released a compilation CD filled with music from their past games. The album is titled The Best of LucasArts Original Soundtracks and features music from the Monkey Island series, Grim Fandango, Outlaws, and The Dig.

2003 saw the fruitful collaboration of LucasArts and BioWare on the well reviewed role-playing game, Knights of the Old Republic. Combining modern 3D graphics with high-quality storytelling and a sophisticated role-playing game system, this game reinvigorated the Star Wars franchise. Its 2004 sequel Knights of the Old Republic II: The Sith Lords continued in the same vein, but LucasArts was criticized for forcing the developer Obsidian Entertainment to release the sequel unfinished, resulting in a significant amount of cut content, a disappointing ending and numerous bugs. 2003 also saw the release of Gladius, a gladiator Tactical RPG that was positively received but sold poorly and was even rated as one of the "best Xbox games most people never played" by Official Xbox Magazine.

In 2003, LucasArts and the Star Wars franchise also branched out in a new direction—the world of the MMORPG, with the creation of Star Wars Galaxies. After a successful launch, the first expansion, Jump to Lightspeed, was released in 2004. The new expansion featured the addition of real-time space combat. This was continued in Rage of the Wookiees, an additional expansion which added an additional planet for users to explore. Also, a new expansion, Trials of Obi-Wan was released on November 1, 2005, consisting of several new missions focusing on the Episode 3 planet, Mustafar. While Star Wars Galaxies still retained a devoted following, it also alienated many players. Star Wars Galaxies chose to ignore the timeline established in the original films, during which the game is set, and also allowed players to play as Jedi characters. The game also underwent several major redesigns, which were received with mixed reactions by players.

=== Restructuring under Jim Ward ===
In April 2004, Jim Ward, V.P. of marketing, online and global distributions at Lucasfilm, was appointed president of LucasArts. Ward performed a top-to-bottom audit of LucasArts infrastructure, describing the company's state as "quite a mess." In 2003, LucasArts had reportedly grossed just over $100,000,000 according to N.P.D., primarily from its Star Wars titles — significantly less than the grosses from the year's top single titles such as Halo. Ward produced a five-year investment plan to refit the company. Previous Star Wars games had been produced by external developers such as Raven Software, BioWare and Obsidian; Ward now prioritized making LucasArts' internal game development work effectively and adapt to the evolving game industry. Star Wars: Battlefront, Star Wars: Republic Commando, and Star Wars: Episode III survived cuts that closed down other in-development games and reduced staff from about 450 to 190 employees. Ward also canceled Star Wars Rogue Squadron Trilogy which was 50% completed and it was going to be released on the Xbox in 2004. Factor 5 was going to develop a Rogue Squadron game titled Rogue Squadron: X-Wing vs Tie Fighter for the Xbox 360 but it was canceled by LucasArts. After Factor 5's exclusivity with Sony ended they decided to release Rogue Squadron Trilogy for the Wii, but it was eventually cancelled as well.

In 2004, LucasArts released Star Wars: Battlefront, based on the same formula as the popular Battlefield series of games. It ended up becoming the best-selling Star Wars game of all time to that point, aided by a marketing tie-in with the original trilogy D.V.D. release. Its sequel, Star Wars: Battlefront II, was released on November 1, 2005, and featured new locales such as Episode III planets Mustafar, Mygeeto, etc., in addition to space combat, playable Jedi, and new special units like Bothan spies and Imperial officers. In this same year, the second "Knights of the Old Republic" game was in production. LucasArts told Obsidian Entertainment that the project needed to be finished by that year's holiday season. Obsidian was forced to cut huge amounts of content from the game, resulting in a rushed, unfinished Knights of the Old Republic II.

In March 2005, LucasArts published Lego Star Wars: The Video Game, the first game in the popular Lego video game franchise by Traveller's Tales. It was based on the Star Wars prequel trilogy. In May 2005, LucasArts released Revenge of the Sith, a third person action game based on the film. Also in 2005, LucasArts released Star Wars: Republic Commando, and one of their few non-Star Wars games, Mercenaries, developed by Pandemic Studios. On February 16, 2006, LucasArts released Star Wars: Empire at War, a real-time strategy game developed by Petroglyph. September 12, 2006, saw the release of Lego Star Wars II: The Original Trilogy, the sequel to the popular Lego Star Wars: The Video Game. Lego Star Wars II, once again developed by Traveller's Tales and published by LucasArts, follows the same basic format as the first game, but, as the name indicates, covers the original Star Wars trilogy.

A game titled Traxion was announced. Traxion was a rhythm game which was under development for the PlayStation Portable by British developer Kuju Entertainment, scheduled to be released in Q4 2006 by LucasArts, but was instead cancelled in January 2007. The game was to feature a number of minigames, and would support imported songs from the player's own mp3 library as well as the game's bundled collection. In May 2007, LucasArts announced Fracture and stated that "new intellectual properties serve a vital role to the growth of LucasArts". Mercenaries: Playground of Destruction was labelled the number one new IP in 2005 and Thrillville the number one new children's IP in 2006. Fracture was released on October 7, 2008, to average reviews. Mercenaries: Playground of Destruction was released on January 11, 2005, to critical and commercial success which led to a sequel, Mercenaries 2: World in Flames. Thrillville was released on November 21, 2006, and Thrillville: Off the Rails was released on October 16, 2007.

On September 16, 2008, Star Wars: The Force Unleashed was released to mixed reviews, though it quickly became the fastest-selling Star Wars game of all time. The rapid scaling down of internal projects at LucasArts was also reflected in its handling of games developed by external developers. During the tenure of Ward, Free Radical was contracted to produce Star Wars: Battlefront III, which had been in production for 2 years. Free Radical co-founder Steve Ellis described how working with LucasArts evolved from being "the best relationship we'd ever had with a publisher" to withholding money for 6 months and abusing the independent developer's position to withhold the full project cancellation fee—this was a major event which contributed towards Free Radical entering administration.

=== Last years as part of an independent Lucasfilm ===
Ward left the company in early February 2008, for personal reasons. He was replaced by Howard Roffman as interim president. Darrell Rodriguez, who came from Electronic Arts, took Roffman's place in April 2008. About a month prior to release of Star Wars: The Force Unleashed II, LucasArts scaled down the internal development studio. The aforementioned game received a mediocre score from some media outlets such as IGN, GameSpot and GameTrailers. After release, minor adjustment in staffing resulted in even more layoffs.

The successor to Star Wars: Knights of the Old Republic II: The Sith Lords, in the form of the MMORPG Star Wars: The Old Republic, was announced on October 21, 2008, at an invitation-only press event. developed by BioWare. It was released in December 2011. They also published Star Wars: The Clone Wars – Republic Heroes in 2009 for all current systems. The game is a tie-in to The Clone Wars television series and was released on October 6, 2009, receiving generally negative reviews.

During television network G4's coverage of the 2006 E3 Convention, a LucasArts executive was asked about the return of popular franchises such as Monkey Island. The executive responded that the company was currently focusing on new franchises, and that LucasArts may return to the "classic franchises" in 2015, though it was unclear as to whether the date was put forwards as an actual projection, or hyperbole. This turned out to be hyperbole, as LucasArts and Telltale Games announced new adventure games in a joint press release in 2009. The games announced were Tales of Monkey Island, which was to be developed by Telltale, and a LucasArts-developed enhanced remake of the 1990 title The Secret of Monkey Island, with the intent of bringing the old game to a new audience. According to LucasArts, this announcement was "just the start of LucasArts' new mission to revitalize its deep portfolio of beloved gaming franchises". Following the success of this, LucasArts released the sequel, Monkey Island 2 – Special Edition in the summer of 2010.

The company began experiencing turnovers in layoffs in 2010. Rodriguez left in May after just two years on the job. A Lucasfilm board of Directors and a game industry veteran, Jerry Bowerman, filled in during the transition. Rodriguez was ultimately replaced in June by Paul Meegan, formerly of Gears of War developer Epic Games. In July 2010, Haden Blackman, who served as creative director on the original Star Wars: The Force Unleashed, LucasArts' most successful internally produced title of recent years, and the sequel, unexpectedly left. However, the company scored a surprise coup in August 2010 when Clint Hocking, a high-profile game director from Ubisoft, announced that he would be joining LucasArts. His tenure at LucasArts was short lived however, as Hocking left LucasArts in June 2012 before the game he was working on was released. In September 2010, a third of the employees at LucasArts were laid off.

In March 2011, LucasArts published a sequel to the popular Lego Star Wars series, Lego Star Wars III: The Clone Wars, based on the Clone Wars animated series, once again developed by Traveller's Tales. Sony Online Entertainment announced in June 2011 that Star Wars Galaxies would be shutting down at the end of 2011. Its services were terminated on December 15, 2011. Another canceled title of Lucasarts was a Darth Maul game which was going to be developed by the same company which made the Wii version of The Force Unleashed II. On April 26, 2011, LucasArts announced that it had acquired a license from Epic Games to develop a number of future titles using the Unreal Engine 3 for a number of platforms. Star Wars 1313, a proposed action-adventure about Boba Fett navigating Coruscant's subterranean underworld, was confirmed to use the Unreal Engine 3. (Note: In September 2013, Lucasfilm chief technology strategy officer Kim Libreri demonstrated a video of motion capture being processed in real time by the Star Wars 1313 engine and its assets.) However, the game was cancelled as a result of the closure of the development arm of LucasArts.

In April 2012, LucasArts published Kinect Star Wars, developed by Terminal Reality, for the Xbox 360. It was poorly reviewed by critics, receiving an aggregated score of 53.32% on GameRankings and 55/100 on Metacritic. In August 2012, Meegan, who replaced Rodriguez as president in 2010, also left his position at LucasArts after just two years on the job. Kevin Parker and Gio Corsi were named to co-lead the studio until the studio would choose a permanent president, with the former as interim head of business operations and the latter as interim head of studio production. The last game released through LucasArts as a subsidiary of an independent Lucasfilm was Angry Birds Star Wars, a game that gave the Angry Birds characters costumes and abilities based on the original Star Wars trilogy. It was released on November 8, 2012, before the Disney acquisition of Lucasfilm was finalized. The game was developed and published by Rovio Entertainment, and licensed by LucasArts.

=== Acquisition by Disney ===
The Walt Disney Company acquired Lucasfilm and its subsidiaries, including LucasArts, on December 21, 2012, following regulatory approval in a deal for $4.05 billion. At the time, there were no plans for any downsizing of Lucasfilm divisions, and a LucasArts representative said that "for the time being, all projects are business as usual". In the months that followed, LucasArts was believed to be working on three untitled games: an open-world RPG, an FPS, and an aerial combat game. This included cancelling Star Wars games already in development such as Star Wars 1313, First Assault and Star Wars: The Force Unleashed III to put more focus on Star Wars: Episode VII – The Force Awakens.

On April 3, 2013, Lucasfilm announced that it was shuttering its video game development practice and laying off most of the LucasArts staff. Any further game development would be handled by Disney Interactive Studios or licensed to third-party developers. A skeleton staff of fewer than ten employees remained at LucasArts to function as a video game licensor. Disney indicated that the new business model would "[minimize] the company's risk while achieving a broad portfolio of quality Star Wars games." Around 150 staff members lost their jobs as a result of the closure. The layoffs at LucasArts also resulted in layoffs at fellow visual effects subsidiary Industrial Light & Magic; as many of LucasArts' employees also worked for ILM, the company was left overstaffed. Electronic Arts became one of the major third-party publishers for Star Wars games through an exclusive multi-year license, while Disney Interactive Studios would handle development for the casual gaming market of "mobile, social, tablet and online game categories".

=== 2021–present ===
On January 11, 2021, Lucasfilm announced that it was reestablishing the Lucasfilm Games brand for all future gaming titles from Lucasfilm, though it would remain solely as a licensor of Lucasfilm properties. Later that week, it was announced that MachineGames was developing a game based upon the Indiana Jones franchise with Todd Howard serving as an executive producer and Bethesda publishing the game, and that Massive Entertainment was developing an open world Star Wars game with Julian Gerighty serving as creative director and Ubisoft publishing the game. It was also revealed that EA was still in development on several games based upon the Star Wars franchise. In September 2021, it was announced that a remake of Knights of the Old Republic was in development. The game is being developed by Aspyr for Windows and PlayStation 5, for which it will serve as a timed console-exclusive.

In December 2021, Star Wars Eclipse was announced at The Game Awards 2021; it is an action-adventure game in the early stages of development by Quantic Dream. The game will feature multiple playable characters with branching narratives. It is set in the Star Wars universe and is part of the High Republic multimedia project, which places the events of the game 200 years before the original Star Wars trilogy. In January 2022, it was announced that Respawn Entertainment would be developing multiple Star Wars games, including a Star Wars Jedi: Fallen Order sequel, entitled Star Wars Jedi: Survivor, alongside FPS and Strategy video games. In April 2022, it was announced that Lucasfilm Games would be co-publishing Return to Monkey Island alongside Devolver Digital, a sequel to LeChuck's Revenge with series creator Ron Gilbert returning to develop the game with his company Terrible Toybox. That same month, it was announced that Skydance New Media would be collaborating with Lucasfilm Games to make a game based in the Star Wars universe, with Amy Hennig leading the project. In June 2023, it was revealed that the Indiana Jones game from MachineGames and Bethesda Softworks would release for Windows and Xbox Series X/S as a console-exclusive. In August 2024, the new open-world action-adventure game Star Wars Outlaws was released in cooperation with Massive Entertainment and Ubisoft.

== Logo ==
The original "Gold Guy" LucasArts logo (1992–2005)

The simplified and modernized “Gold Guy” LucasArts logo (2005–2013)

The original Lucasfilm Games logo was based upon the existing Lucasfilm movie logo, with a number of variations on it being used. This logo was later brought back when the Lucasfilm Games branding was revived in 2021. The long-lived LucasArts logo, affectionately known as the "Gold Guy", was introduced in 1990 and first used within Monkey Island 2: LeChuck's Revenge (the first game shipped under the LucasArts name). The logo consisted of a crude gold-colored figure inspired by an Ancestral Puebloan petroglyph, standing on a purple letter "L" inscribed with the company name. The figure had its hands up in the air, as if a sun were rising from behind him. It was also said to resemble an eye, with the rays of the sun as eyelashes. The logo was revised in late 2005, losing the letter "L" pedestal and introducing a more rounded version of the gold-colored figure.

The last game to feature the original "Gold Guy" was Star Wars: Episode III – Revenge of the Sith, while the new logo was first seen in Star Wars: Battlefront II. In the games, the figure sometimes does an action like throw a lightsaber or cast Force Lightning. In 1998, LucasArts approached Finnish game developer Remedy Entertainment, citing that their logo was copied from the top portion of the LucasArts logo, and threatened legal action. Remedy was by that time already in the process of redesigning their logo, so it complied by taking its old logo offline from its website, and before introducing a new logo.

== The LucasArts Archives ==
The LucasArts Archives are a series of CD-ROM personal computer game re-releases and compilations from publisher LucasArts.

- The LucasArts Archives Vol. I (1995)
  - Indiana Jones and the Fate of Atlantis
  - Maniac Mansion: Day of the Tentacle
  - Sam & Max Hit the Road
  - Star Wars Screen Entertainment desktop utility
  - Star Wars: Rebel Assault (3 level demo)
  - LucasArts Super Sampler disc featuring demos of Full Throttle, Star Wars: Dark Forces, Star Wars: Rebel Assault II: The Hidden Empire, and Star Wars: TIE Fighter Collector's Edition CD-ROM.
- The LucasArts Macintosh Archives Vol. I (1996)
  - Indiana Jones and the Fate of Atlantis
  - Maniac Mansion: Day of the Tentacle
  - Sam & Max Hit the Road
  - Star Wars: Rebel Assault
  - Star Wars: Dark Forces (3 level demo)
  - LucasArts Super Sampler disc featuring demos of Full Throttle, Star Wars: X-Wing, Star Wars: Rebel Assault II: The Hidden Empire, The Dig, and Mortimer and the Riddles of the Medallion.
- The LucasArts Archives Vol. II: The Star Wars Collection (1996) was released as part of Lucasfilm's promotion of the then-upcoming expanded theatrical re-releases of the original Star Wars trilogy. The Star Wars Collection contained:
  - Star Wars: Rebel Assault
  - Star Wars: Rebel Assault II: The Hidden Empire
  - Star Wars: TIE Fighter Collector's Edition CD-ROM
  - Star Wars: Dark Forces (demo)
  - Star Wars: Making Magic (Multimedia CD-ROM featuring a behind-the-scenes look at the new versions of the Star Wars films)
- The LucasArts Archives Vol. III (1997)
  - Afterlife
  - The Dig
  - Full Throttle
  - Monkey Island Madness (a compilation disc of The Secret of Monkey Island and Monkey Island 2: LeChuck's Revenge)
  - Star Wars: Dark Forces
  - LucasArts Super Sampler 2 disc featuring demos of The Curse of Monkey Island, Indiana Jones and His Desktop Adventures, Outlaws, Star Wars Jedi Knight: Dark Forces II, Star Wars: X-Wing vs. TIE Fighter, and Star Wars: Yoda Stories.
- The LucasArts Archives Vol. IV: The Star Wars Collection II (1998)
  - Star Wars: Dark Forces
  - Star Wars: TIE Fighter Collector's Edition CD-ROM
  - Star Wars: X-Wing Collector's Edition CD-ROM
  - Star Wars: Yoda Stories
  - Star Wars: Making Magic (same as from the first Star Wars Collection)
  - Demo disc of Star Wars Jedi Knight: Dark Forces II, Star Wars: Jedi Knight: Mysteries of the Sith, and Star Wars: X-Wing vs. TIE Fighter.

Later games published under the LucasArts Archives brand were budget-priced reissues of individual games, except for Monkey Island Archives, which was a compilation of The Secret of Monkey Island, Monkey Island 2: LeChuck's Revenge, and The Curse of Monkey Island, released with The Curse of Monkey Island's box art.

Many of the games that were released in these Archive collections are not directly compatible with modern operating systems, but can still be played using the ScummVM software. The LucasArts Macintosh Archives Vol. I was the top-selling Macintosh game for March, April, and May 1997, selling over 15,000 units over those three months.

== Legacy ==
Ex-LucasArts developers have founded numerous San Francisco game development studios such as Double Fine Productions (2000), Telltale Games (2004), MunkyFun (2008), Dynamighty (2011), SoMa Play (2013), and Fifth Journey (2015) playing a significant role in the continued development of computer games in the Bay Area. At the 2014 Electronic Entertainment Expo, Sony Computer Entertainment announced Grim Fandango Remastered, developed by Double Fine Productions as a console exclusive for PlayStation platforms. It was released in 2015 for PlayStation 4, PlayStation Vita, Microsoft Windows, OS X, Linux, Android, and iOS.

During Sony's new PlayStation Experience convention in 2014, another remaster by Double Fine, Day of the Tentacle Remastered, was announced. It was released in March 2016 for PlayStation 4, PlayStation Vita, Microsoft Windows, OS X, and Linux. At the 2015 PlayStation Experience, another remastered game by Double Fine was announced, Full Throttle Remastered. It was released in April 2017 for PlayStation 4, PlayStation Vita, Microsoft Windows, OS X, and Linux.

== See also ==
- List of LucasArts games
- List of Star Wars games
