= Big Sky Trooper =

1995 video game

- Developer: LucasArts
- Publisher: JVC Musical Industries
- Platform: Super NES
- Release: NA: October 1995; PAL: 1995
- Genre: Action
- Mode: Single player

Big Sky Trooper is a sci-fi action game produced by JVC Musical Industries and LucasArts for the Super NES in October 1995. The game runs on the Zombies Ate My Neighbors engine.

== Gameplay ==
At the start of the game, the player chooses an avatar, male or female. The evil Space Slug forces, led by the Sultan of Slime, have launched a sudden attack on humanity, quickly occupying the majority of planets in the galaxy, and forcing the Sidereal Shock Troops to recruit soldiers to counter the threat. After passing three "grueling tests", the player is made a "21-star general" and transported to the E.S.S. Dire Wolf, where they meet the ship's Flexible Interactive Digital Omnicomputer (FIDO, represented by a dog). After this point, the player receives various orders, from rescuing stranded agents on cartoon-like worlds, retrieving upgrade parts for the ship, and repairing machines which help keep the universe running.

The vast majority of the game, however, is spent hunting down and driving the Slugs off different planets. When arriving at an occupied world, the game switches to an overhead view, where the Dire Wolf must shoot down all enemies (beginning with small, weak ships, followed by larger ones later in the game). After this, the player dons a suit of powered armor and descends to the planet's surface to hunt down the Slugs. Once this is finished, any additional tasks (such as speaking to people, opening up passages to the different machines) can be completed, or the player can return to the Dire Wolf and travel to the next planet.

== Reception ==
A reviewer for Next Generation, noting the incongruous mix of cutesy graphics and storyline with remarkably complex gameplay and levels, concluded that "What exactly this game's intended audience is supposed to be, we can't figure out, but it deserves at least a small one." He gave it three out of five stars.
