= Star Wars: X-Wing (video game) =

1993 video game

- X-Wing's box art depicts a dogfight between several X-wings and TIE fighters.
- Developer: Totally Games
- Publishers: NA: LucasArts; EU: U.S. Gold
- Designers: Lawrence Holland; Edward Kilham
- Composer: Peter McConnell
- Series: Star Wars: X-Wing
- Platforms: MS-DOS, Macintosh, Windows
- Release: March 4, 1993 (Note: March 4 is the retail date but LucasArts had fulfilled direct mail orders since late February.)
- Genre: Space simulation
- Mode: Single-player

Star Wars: X-Wing is a space simulation video game, the first of the X-Wing combat flight simulation games series. The player's character flies starfighters, including the X-wing, for the Rebel Alliance. The narrative precedes and parallels the events of Star Wars Episode IV: A New Hope.

Designed by Lawrence Holland and Edward Kilham's Totally Games for LucasArts, X-Wing is one of the first games to use 3D polygon graphics for spaceships and the first non-adventure game to use the iMUSE music system. The game was updated and re-released several times, and was followed by three sequels. X-Wing became a best-seller with critical acclaim.

== Plot ==
Players take the role of a Rebel pilot fighting the Galactic Empire before and during the climactic battle of Star Wars: A New Hope, the film series debut. The story consists of three tours of duty of 12 to 14 operations each; although the tours can be played out of order, operations within each tour are played linearly. Briefings, cutscenes, and in-flight messages advance the plot. A limited edition of the game was packaged with a 96-page novella, The Farlander Papers by Rusel DeMaria, that provides story information. The novella, later made part of Prima Publishing's strategy guide, presents a pilot named Keyan Farlander as the player's character for most of the operations.

Progress through the game depends on fulfilling each operation's primary objectives; if the player fails an operation, it can be reattempted. The initial game's storyline concludes with the player flying as Luke Skywalker in his attack against the Death Star. Two expansion packs extend the story beyond the events in A New Hope, up to the establishment of the Rebel base depicted at the beginning of The Empire Strikes Back.

== Gameplay ==
A TIE fighter fires past the player's X-wing during the fourth operation of the first tour of duty. The TIE fighter model consists of 3D polygons; most previous simulators use bitmapped images instead. The bars over the "ELS" text (right-center) indicate the player's power allocations to engines, lasers, and shields.

After choosing a pilot file to play with, the player is presented with a "concourse" aboard the Mon Calamari Star Cruiser Independence. From here, the player can choose between flying in a proving ground, historical simulator, or tour of duty. In the proving ground, the player maneuvers a starfighter through a series of gates within a time limit. The historical simulator depicts missions not tied to the main storyline. The game's plot is advanced through tour of duty operations. When the player completes a tour of duty operation, it becomes available for replay in the historical simulator. In addition to the flight options, players can access a technical room that shows images of the game's spacecraft, and a film room for reviewing recorded flight data.

As a space flight simulator game, X-Wing puts the player at the controls of various starfighters in space combat against enemy spacecraft. Drawing some influence from Star Raiders (1979), the game is played in first-person from inside the cockpit. The initial game offered pilotable A-wing, X-wing, and Y-wing craft; the B-Wing expansion adds the B-wing as a playable vehicle.

All flight takes place in space; the player does not encounter gravity or atmospheric effects. The starfighters are equipped with recharging laser weapons and limited warheads. The player controls power allocation between lasers, deflector shields, and engines. Charging the lasers and shields slows the player's craft, giving effective power management an important role in gameplay. The player can toggle the firing mode (separate or linked) of each weapon type, and balance the shields forward, aft, or evenly.

Missions types include dogfights, escorting or disabling other vessels, convoy attacks, and strikes on capital ships. During missions, the player can send orders to friendly craft. In the original floppy disk version, the player can assign other saved pilot profiles to be his or her wingman; the higher the rank of the saved profile, the better the computer-controlled wingman would perform. This was removed from subsequent releases.

The player earns points for each tour of duty mission by completing objectives and destroying enemy spacecraft. Medals and ranks are awarded for campaign progress; if the player dies in combat, his or her score and awards are lost, but campaign progress is preserved.

== Development ==
Until 1992, Broderbund held the license for Star Wars computer games. When the license reverted to LucasArts, designer Lawrence Holland decided to develop a Star Wars game to take advantage of his prior experience developing World War II air combat simulators. X-Wing's game engine is one of the first to use higher-detailed 3D polygonal graphics, rather than bitmap sprites.

The game's MIDI musical score includes pieces from John Williams's Star Wars score in addition to original compositions. X-Wing is the first non-adventure game to use the iMUSE (Interactive MUsic Streaming Engine), although the system's level of interactivity is reduced from previous iterations. For X-Wing, iMUSE provides musical cues in response to in-game events, such as the arrival of friendly or hostile ships. Music designers Michael Land, Clint Bajakian, and Peter McConnell used familiar elements of Williams's music to create these cues. The musical cues were designed to blend seamlessly with the rest of the in-game music soundtrack.

== Cast ==
- Clive Revill as Dodonna (voice)
- Erik Bauersfeld as Ackbar (voice)
- Nick Jameson as Moff Tarkin (voice)
- Clint Bajakian as Darth Vader (voice)
- C. Andrew Nelson as Luke Skywalker (voice)

== Release ==
TIE bombers fly toward a Mon Calamari Star Cruiser in the 1998 release. This version updated the game engine to that of X-Wing vs. TIE Fighter, introducing 3D-accelerated graphics and higher-resolution cockpits. It replaced the dynamic MIDI soundtrack with looped audio of John Williams's orchestral Star Wars soundtrack.

X-Wing was originally released on floppy disks in February 1993. Later that year, LucasArts released the Imperial Pursuit and B-Wing expansion packs on floppy disk. A sixth tour of duty, set during the Rebel Alliance's time at Echo Base, was planned but never produced; the medals case of the game was also designed to hold a sixth campaign ribbon row and medal. Some of the material for the sixth tour of duty was later incorporated into the X-Wing special edition and also the later game TIE Fighter.

LucasArts released the TIE Fighter space combat simulator in 1994. That year, it released the Collector's CD-ROM Edition of X-Wing. This edition runs on the TIE Fighter game engine, based on the X-Wing engine. The newer engine supports Gouraud shading and other rendering enhancements. The Collector's CD-ROM Edition includes the base game, both expansions, some adjustments to missions, redesigned cutscenes, bonus missions, and voiceovers for the mission briefings and in-game radio messages. Erik Bauersfeld reprised Admiral Ackbar from Return of the Jedi. Clive Revill, who voiced Emperor Palpatine in The Empire Strikes Back (pre-2004 version), portrayed Admiral Dodonna. The floppy disk version could be redeemed for a fee to LucasArts, and be upgraded to Gold Edition of the CD-ROM version, with a golden CD-ROM and a free gift.

In 1998, LucasArts released the X-Wing Collector Series Edition. This product again changed the game engine, this time to the engine behind X-Wing vs. TIE Fighter. This update added 3D hardware acceleration and texture mapping to the game engine, and further changed some of the visuals before and during operation briefings. The game was designed to run under Windows 9x rather than DOS. Additionally, the MIDI-based iMUSE soundtrack was replaced with looping Red Book audio recordings of the Star Wars score.

On October 28, 2014, X-Wing and TIE Fighter were released for download online for the first time. The original MS-DOS and Windows editions were updated for modern PCs.

== Reception ==
Reception

Review scores
Publication	Score
AllGame	4.5/5
Computer Gaming World	4/5
Next Generation	4/5
MacUser	(Collector's CD-ROM) 4/5

Awards
Publication	Award
Next Generation	#23 Top 100 Games of All Time
Computer Gaming World	1993 Simulation of the Year
Electronic Entertainment	Best Game of 1993
Origins Award	Best Fantasy or Science Fiction Computer Game of 1993
PC Gamer US	#5 Top 40: The Best Games of All Time
PC Gamer UK	#2 Top 50 PC Games of All Time
PC Gamer US	1994 Best CD-ROM Enhancement

Star Wars: X-Wing became a commercial hit that surpassed the predictions of LucasArts. Its launch shipment of 100,000 units sold out during its debut weekend; nearly 500,000 units in total were ordered by retailers by December 1993.

X-Wing, which one author later stated "skillfully captured the feel" of the Star Wars films, was a best-seller in 1993. In its 1992 preview of the game, Computer Gaming World wrote that the developers "are taking aim at Chris Roberts and his megahit Wing Commander series". The magazine said in its 1993 review that some of the missions were imbalanced, and criticized the need to identify and execute precise "solutions" to them. It praised the flight model as "excellently executed and a joy to play", however, and concluded "I enjoyed the experience tremendously" and looked forward to expansion disks and sequels. A 1994 survey in the magazine later gave the game four stars out of five, stating that it was "A superb rendition of the Star Wars universe, albeit victory conditions in the scenarios are a bit too structured and rigid". Compute! said X-Wing succeeds at being "the first authentic space-combat simulator", comparing it favorably to the contemporaneous Wing Commander, while calling the game's rigid structure with no margin for error, "controversial". A reviewer for Next Generation said X-Wing "was a deserved, runaway hit", and scored the Macintosh conversion four out of five stars. He praised the updating of the graphics with texture mapping, light sourcing, and higher resolution, as well as the inclusion of the Imperial Pursuit and B-Wing expansion packs. He criticized that the game's infamously rigid difficulty had not been fixed in the Macintosh version, but found it an overall welcome port of an outstanding game. In the following month's issue, Next Generation ranked X-Wing and Star Wars: TIE Fighter collectively as number 23 on their "Top 100 Games of All Time".

Jim Trunzo reviewed X-Wing: Space Combat Simulator in White Wolf #36 (1993), rating it a 5 out of 5 and stated that "X-Wing from Lucas Arts will push both your machine and your ability to the limit. Like the Academy Awards, products released early are sometimes forgotten when the end of the year award ceremonies roll around. In this case, however, I'd be willing to bet that X-Wing is going to take home a bundle of honors, regardless of its debut date."

In 1994 Computer Gaming World stated that B-Wing was a better value than Imperial Pursuit but "To the avid X-Wing disciple both expansion disks should be considered must-buy products".

X-Wing was named the best "general simulation" of 1993 by Computer Games Strategy Plus. It also received awards for "Simulation of the Year" from Computer Gaming World (with World Circuit), "Best Simulation of 1993" from Computer Game Review, and "Best Game of 1993" from Electronic Entertainment. In 1994 X-Wing won the Origins Award for "Best Fantasy or Science Fiction Computer Game of 1993", and PC Gamer US named X-Wing the 5th best computer game ever. The editors wrote, "For high-tech dog-fighting action, nothing can touch X-Wing." That year PC Gamer UK named it the second best computer game of all time, calling it "the only game of its type that we constantly find ourselves coming back to". In 1995 PC Gamer US presented X-Wing Collector's CD-ROM with its 1994 "Best CD-ROM Enhancement" award. The editors wrote, "This is enhancement above and beyond the call of duty, and sets the new standard by which all future CD editions will be judged." The Collector's CD-ROM was also named one of the top 50 CD-ROMs of 1996 by MacUser.

GameSpot called X-Wing "one of the best" Star Wars games and an example of how immersive a game can be; they specifically praised the game's graphics, attention to detail, audio, and story. The Keyan Farlander character later appears in two New Jedi Order books, and Hasbro in 2008 created a Keyan Farlander action figure. He is a B-Wing pilot in the Star Wars: X-Wing and Star Wars: Armada miniatures games produced by Fantasy Flight Games. Game Informer ranked the game 42nd on the top 100 games of all time praising the graphics and game speed
