= Star Wars: TIE Fighter =

1994 video game

- Developer: Totally Games
- Publisher: LucasArts
- Designers: Lawrence Holland; Edward Kilham
- Composer: Peter McConnell
- Series: Star Wars: X-Wing
- Platforms: MS-DOS, Classic Mac OS, Windows
- Release: July 20, 1994
- Genre: Space simulation
- Mode: Single-player

Star Wars: TIE Fighter is a space combat simulator published in 1994 for MS-DOS and Classic Mac OS as the follow-up to Star Wars: X-Wing. It places the player in the role of an Imperial starfighter pilot during events that occur between The Empire Strikes Back and Return of the Jedi.

The game was produced by Lawrence Holland and Edward Kilham's Totally Games studio. Based on X-Wing's game engine, TIE Fighter supports Gouraud shading and adds gameplay features and craft not available in X-Wing. TIE Fighter was updated and re-released several times, and it was a critical success. It is considered by some critics to be among the greatest video games of all time.

== Plot ==
The game's plot begins soon after the Empire's victory on Hoth in The Empire Strikes Back. As with X-Wing, the player's character is unnamed in the game; however, an included novella and Prima Publishing's strategy guide name the character Maarek Stele and provide a background narrative. In addition to fighting Rebel Alliance forces, the player fights pirates, combatants in a civil war, and traitorous Imperial forces. The original game ends with the player preventing a coup against Emperor Palpatine and being personally rewarded during a large ceremony. Subsequent expansions focus on Grand Admiral Thrawn's efforts to stop an Imperial traitor; the final mission of the second expansion concludes just before the climactic battle at the end of Return of the Jedi. Though playing on the side of the Star Wars saga's villain, the game presents Imperial forces as maintainers of peace and order in a tumultuous galaxy, which was reinforced as the player character mostly serves under the tactical genius Thrawn rather than the terrifying Darth Vader.

The storyline is divided across thirteen tours of duty (seven in the original game and three in each of the expansion packs), each of which has four to eight missions. Although some of the tours can be played out of order, individual missions within each battle are played linearly. Mission briefings and debriefings, cutscenes, and in-flight communication advance the story.

== Gameplay ==
After selecting a pilot file, the player views the "concourse", a hub with doors to different features of the game. While the main focus of gameplay is completing battles, the concourse also offers several other areas. The training simulator lets the player fly each of the pilotable Imperial craft through a complex obstacle course. The combat chamber offers four extra missions for each craft, ranging from training scenarios to historical reenactments of important missions. There is also a room to view mission recordings, and a tech room to view information about every spacecraft that appears in the game. When the player selects a mission, they are given a briefing, consisting of a dialog describing the mission and an animated map illustrating vessel positions and basic flight patterns. The player may optionally read a list questions and answers about the mission.

In addition to the standard mission briefing covering primary objectives, there is often another briefing given by a mysterious figure who belongs to the Emperor's Inner Circle. This person informs the pilot of optional secondary objectives and provides additional plot information. Completing the primary objectives allows the player to progress to the next mission and earn Imperial military promotion; completing secondary and secret objectives garners additional medals and promotions within the inner circle.

=== Combat ===
The player pilots a TIE fighter inspecting freighters in the game's first story-related mission. Gouraud shading and a 3D view in the target information window are enhancements over the X-Wing game engine.

In-flight gameplay is similar to X-Wing, played primarily in first-person but with the option to switch to third-person. All flight takes place in space; the player does not encounter gravity or atmospheric effects. Mission roles including dogfighting, escorting or disabling other craft, inspecting vehicles, and attacking capital ships and space stations. Initial missions place the player in unshielded TIE fighter variants; as the game progresses, the player gains access to advanced fighters with shields and better armaments.

Laser cannons and ion cannons serve as short range weapons, damaging or disabling targets respectively. Some starfighters carry limited number of missiles or torpedoes for additional range/firepower. As with X-Wing, the player needs to balance power allocation between weapons, engines, and shields (when available); some craft also require the player to further balance power for a beam weapon (a tractor beam which can prevent enemy fighters from maneuvering temporarily, or a jamming beam which can disrupt the defensive fire of enemy capital ships). The player can also change the firing modes of their fighter's weapons (for example, having a pair of laser cannons fire together or alternately). If the ship possesses shields, the player chooses the shield balance between front and rear.

Shields are rechargeable; they protect from damage but are depleted when absorbing damage. When the player's craft is unshielded, enemy fire will damage the player's hull. Hull damage can disable systems, such as the engines or targeting computer. Disabled systems will slowly be repaired; TIE Fighter allows the player to choose the order in which systems are repaired. Hull damage may also cause cockpit displays to break, rendering them useless for the remainder of the mission. Heavy hull damage will destroy the player's spacecraft. When the player's craft is destroyed before completing a mission, or the mission is otherwise a failure, the player can attempt the mission again. However, the mission is still successful if the player's craft is destroyed after all primary mission objectives are completed.

While based upon X-Wing, TIE Fighter does introduce several gameplay additions. The targeting system allows players to target capital ships' and space stations' components, such as shield generators and weapons. Additionally, the targeting display shows a 3D model and relative orientation of the player's target. Mission objective status is accessible in-game, as is a log of in-flight messages.

== Music ==
The music for Star Wars: TIE Fighter was composed by Clint Bajakian and contains many of John Williams' themes from the original trilogy. However, many motifs (such as "The Imperial March" motifs) which were originally composed as dark motifs are used as heroic motifs. This is consistent with the theme of the game where the player plays as an Imperial TIE Fighter pilot working for the villainous Galactic Empire.

The in-game music played during flight sequences (missions) uses the iMuse game engine. The soundtrack uses leitmotifs to vary the music played during missions in reaction to the actions of the player or other mission events. For example, a special motif is played when player achieves a victory, when the mission is failed, when secondary or bonus goals or completed, when an Imperial or Rebel capital ship exits hyperspace, etc. This mirrors the use of leitmotifs in the original film music, while also varying the music sequence every mission.

== Release ==
A Mon Calamari Star Cruiser (foreground) and Victory-class Star Destroyer (background) viewed from a TIE Avenger cockpit in the 1998 X-Wing Collector Series version of TIE Fighter. This edition adds texture-mapped graphics.

LucasArts offered a pre-release demo on two floppy disks bundled with Computer Gaming World. The single-mission demo, sponsored by Dodge and featuring an ad for the Dodge Neon, advertises a spring 1994 TIE Fighter release. However, TIE Fighter was not released until later that year, being leaked by software pirates in early July before its official release on July 20. The Defender of the Empire expansion, which adds three battles, was released soon thereafter. Later that year, LucasArts released a Collector's CD-ROM version of X-Wing using TIE Fighter's updated graphics engine.

In 1995, TIE Fighter also received a Collector's CD-ROM. The CD-ROM version offered optional enhanced SVGA graphics, increasing the game's resolution from 320x200 to 640x480. The cinematic cutscenes were also enhanced, and the game received numerous voiceovers. The CD-ROM includes the previously released Defender of the Empire expansion and an additional Enemies of the Empire expansion. In 1997, the Collector's CD-ROM was ported and released for Classic Mac OS.

TIE Fighter is part of the 1998 X-Wing Collector Series, which also includes updated versions of X-Wing and a pared-down version of X-Wing vs. TIE Fighter. This version drops DOS support, installing only under Windows 9x. TIE Fighter and X-Wing use the X-Wing vs. TIE Fighter flight engine, which adds 3D-accelerated graphics and texture mapping. The MIDI-based interactive soundtrack used in previous versions is replaced by looped Red Book audio recordings of John Williams' Star Wars score. This version also requires a joystick; previously, players could use a mouse and keyboard. This version was later bundled with the X-Wing Trilogy, which includes X-Wing and X-Wing Alliance.

On October 28, 2014, TIE Fighter along with X-Wing were released digitally for the first time on GOG.com. Both the original DOS and Windows editions were included, with updates to run on modern PCs.

== Reception ==
Reception

Review scores
Publication	Score
Computer Gaming World	5/5
GameSpot	8.8
Next Generation	3/5
Macworld	4.5/5

Awards
Publication	Award
CGW	"Hall of Fame"
GameSpot	"Greatest Games of All Time" (2004)
IGN	"Top 25 PC Games of All Time" #3 (2007)
IGN	"Hall of Fame" (2007)
IGN	"Top 25 PC Games of All Time" #2 (2009)
PC Gamer	"50 Best Games of All Time" #1 (1997)
Strategy Plus	"Best Game of the Year" (1994)

Gamebytes Magazine gave the original release its "very highest recommendation", citing numerous improvements over X-Wing. The reviewer called the graphics "astonishing" and noted improved artificial intelligence and in-flight information systems. The review's "single complaint" was the lackluster ending. Edge praised many of the graphic and gameplay enhancements and new features over X-Wing, but described the missions as repetitive and complained the game loses appeal when the player isn't fighting for the underdog Rebellion. GameSpot's review of the Collector's CD-ROM Edition called TIE Fighter "the best space combat game ever made" and praised the updated graphics.

James V. Trunzo reviewed TIE Fighter in White Wolf Inphobia #51 (Jan., 1995), rating it a 5 out of 5 and stated that "There's not much bad to say about this product. It's been a wait for Tie Fighter to arrive, but unlike other games that are highly anticipated, this one delivers. Actually, the worst thing about Tie Fighter is that you're flying for the Empire. It's hard to get over the moral queasiness of shooting down the good guys."

Pyramid magazine reviewed Star Wars: TIE Fighter and stated that "Tie Fighter is LucasArts' latest entry in their Star Wars line of 'spaceflight simulations' started by the highly-acclaimed X-Wing, and features the most stunning graphics that I've ever seen."

Macworld's Michael Gowan summarized TIE Fighter as a "great game" that offers the "action of a World War II dogfight".

Next Generation reviewed the Macintosh version of the game, rating it three stars out of five, and stated that "TIE Fighter, like the movies, isn't really at the cutting edge, but both still offer more depth and considered design than many young razzle-dazzlers."

=== Awards and legacy ===
TIE Fighter was named the best "Fantasy Simulation" and best overall computer game of 1994 by Computer Games Strategy Plus, while the editors of PC Gamer US declared it the year's top action game and "the best space-combat simulation ever created." It was a runner-up for the latter magazine's overall "Game of the Year" award, which went to Doom. Similarly, Computer Gaming World nominated TIE Fighter in its "Action Game of the Year" and "Game of the Year" categories, but gave these prizes to Wing Commander III: Heart of the Tiger and X-COM: UFO Defense, respectively.

In 1996, Computer Gaming World declared TIE Fighter the 56th-best computer game ever released. TIE Fighter became the second Lawrence Holland game to be inducted into Computer Gaming World's "Hall of Fame" and was inducted into GameSpot's "Greatest Games of All Time" in July 2004 and IGN's "Hall of Fame" in 2007. In 1996, GamesMaster rated the game 66th on its "Top 100 Games of All Time."

PC Gamer US named Tie Fighter Collector's CD-ROM the "Best CD-ROM Enhancement" of 1995. The editors called it "an enhanced CD-ROM version that comes close to being a whole new game, and is well worth having even if you've already got the original TIE Fighter." The magazine ranked the Collector's CD-ROM Edition #1 in its "Top 50 Greatest Games of All Time" list in May 1997. It was ranked #3 on IGN's list of the top 25 PC games of all time in 2007 and #2 in 2009. The game was recognized again by IGN in 2010 when it was named the "best Star Wars game ever made".

In 1998, PC Gamer declared the TIE Fighter Collector's CD-ROM the 4th-best computer game ever released, and the editors called it "Now updated and looking better than ever [...] TIE Fighter is still an untarnished classic".

In 1996 Next Generation ranked TIE Fighter and Star Wars: X-Wing collectively as number 23 on their "Top 100 Games of All Time", citing the graphics, sound effects, flight engine, and the sense of accomplishment after finishing a mission.

Maarek Stele from the Prima Publishing strategy guide later appears as a TIE Advanced and TIE Defender pilot in the Star Wars: X-Wing miniatures game produced by Fantasy Flight Games.

The TIE Defender and the TIE Avenger were integrated into Star Wars canon following the acquisition of Lucasfilm by The Walt Disney Company and the subsequent decanonizing and rebranding of the Expanded Universe into Star Wars Legends. The TIE Defender first appeared in the third season of Star Wars Rebels, with its background changed to being a new starfighter initiative spearheaded by Thrawn positioned as a cheaper alternative to the Death Star, with Star Wars Tales revealing that it was designed by Morgan Elsbeth. The TIE Avenger made its first appearance in the second season of Andor; like in Legends continuity it continued the lineage of Darth Vader's TIE Advanced x1, though its design and systems greatly differed from its initial appearance in TIE Fighter and was instead partially based on Kylo Ren's TIE whisper from Star Wars: The Rise of Skywalker.

== See also ==
- List of Star Wars starfighters
- List of Star Wars spacecraft
- List of Star Wars video games
