= Mortimer and the Riddles of the Medallion =

1996 PC video game

- Developer(s): LucasArts
- Publisher(s): LucasArts
- Platform(s): Personal computer
- Release: 1996
- Genre(s): Puzzle
- Mode(s): Single-player

Mortimer and the Riddles of the Medallion is a 1996 children's first-person puzzle video game developed and published by LucasArts. Released for Windows and Macintosh, the game follows an oversized, anthropomorphic snail named Mortimer, who seeks to save a fantasy world's animal population. Players pilot Mortimer - whose shell can transform into an aircraft or submarine - through a 3D world, while solving riddles and learning simple biology. The game was shown at the May 1995 Electronic Entertainment Expo, as an attempt by LucasArts to reach a younger demographic. The game uses the Star Wars: Rebel Assault engine. The game was also displayed at E3 1996; at the show, a writer for Computer Games Strategy Plus remarked that it was "very hard to sneer at the pure and lustrous quality of this kiddie title".

== Gameplay ==
Having chosen a player-character ('Sid' or 'Sally'), the player assumes a first-person control (except during cinematic sequences) to guide Mortimer through four ecosystems (savannah, taiga, Polar Ice Cap, and desert). During travel, the player uses its cursor to revive individual animals native to the habitat, earlier identified as changed into stone figures of themselves by antagonist 'Lodius'. Upon encounter with lesser antagonists (usually cyborg-like figures employing sodium chloride against Mortimer), the cursor becomes a weapon to repel these. At the end of each level, the player encounters an anthropomorphic sentinel permitting access to the next in reward for answering a riddle, whereof the answer is always the name of a species revived by the player. After the fourth level ('desert'), the game depicts Lodius' fortress, where the player-character itself must travel a series of mazes unaccompanied by Mortimer. Having overcome the maze and answered a final riddle (whereto the answer may be Lodius; Mortimer; or their common mentor, Prof./Dr. Laslow), the player rejoins Mortimer, whereupon Lodius, attempting to petrify the player-character, changes himself into a statue, with which the protagonists return to the beginning.

== Characters ==
- Sid and Sally: two children, whereof one is chosen by the player as its character. Appointed 'joint keepers' of the Medallion by Laslow.
- Prof./Dr. Laslow: mentor to all the other characters, an inventor and multidisciplinary mad scientist, who apprises the player of its task.
- Mortimer: a nearly elephant-sized, slightly-anthropomorphic garden snail, from whose conversation emerges most of the story's comic relief. His shell, assuming at need the attributes of single-seated aircraft or submersible, serves as the player's vehicle both of travel and of communication with background characters. His chief weakness is exposure to sodium chloride.
- The Medallion: the story's MacGuffin, resembling a stone disc centered upon a humanoid face. It is stolen from Laslow by Lodius and used by him to petrify the story's wild animals and create a nightmarish fortress beyond the game's 'desert' level; thereafter it is separated into seven pieces, whereof Lodius retains the central 'face' while the sections of its 'rim' are protected by the sentinel 'Gates', from whom they are earned by the player's correct answers to riddles. When the player has obtained the whole 'rim', the 'face' is guarded by a carved figure in Lodius' fortress, from behind whom it speaks in a feminine voice accompanied by music.
- Lodius: the game's antagonist, a former pupil of Laslow's, whose destructive use of the Medallion has given him a cacodemonic appearance and the ability to change living things to stone. He is not seen, except in glimpses, until the game's level depicting his fortress, wherein he imprisons Mortimer and threatens to make escargot of him except in exchange for the complete Medallion, which later changes him to stone. Thereafter he re-appears in Laslow's garden as a decorative statue.
- Lodius' Minions: supporting characters, a series of cyborg-like figures divided into four categories. Each category is introduced in a different level of gameplay: the 'Salt-Shaker Hornets' in the Savannah; the 'Beastie Bags' in the Forest; the 'Whopping Poppers' in the Arctic; and the 'Hopspitters' in Lodius' Fortress. Each is overcome by a designated number of cursor clicks representing amounts of mucus launched by the character's artillery. Of the four categories, the preceding three use sodium chloride to weaken Mortimer, where the 'Hopspitter' performs its eponymous function against the player-character itself. If the player fails to overcome the preceding three at any encounter, a short cinematic sequence depicts Mortimer falling from flight and revived at Laslow's laboratory.
- Lodius' Reflection: supporting character, a reflection of Lodius in any of the mirrors in his fortress, but possessing independent speech of his own by which he warns or flatters Lodius.
- The Gates: supporting characters, the immense sentinels guarding pieces of the broken Medallion and permitting transference from their own levels onward. Each resembles a towering humanoid face embedded in local material: the 'savannah' gate in stone; the 'taiga' or 'forest' gate in wood; the 'Arctic' gate in ice; and the 'desert' gate in stone again. Each gate speaks with a different voice, whereof the 'savannah', 'Arctic', and 'desert' gates are male while the 'forest' gate is female; and each, upon accepting Mortimer and the player-character's wish to proceed, sings a stanza extolling the environment and introducing the riddle. Upon the riddle's correct answer, the gate surrenders its piece of the Medallion and permits access to the proximate level.
- The animals: supporting characters, various vertebrates native to each level, changed to statues of themselves by Lodius and revived by the player. Every time an animal is revived, a small icon appears on Mortimer's cockpit indicating that the animal is back to normal. At each 'gate', a representative of each species speaks with the player, revealing data by which the player identifies the species whose name answers the gate's riddle. Although informative, the animals' speech is often whimsical and implies a distinct personality. There are 28 animals the player may interview to get clues for the answers to each riddle, seven for each habitat. As pictured from left to right in each level in Mortimer's cockpit, the animals are:
  - Savannah: rhinoceros, baboon, cheetah, African elephant, giraffe, lion, oxpecker
  - Taiga: grizzly bear, beaver, bald eagle, flying squirrel, mountain goat, moose, opossum
  - Arctic: gray wolf, humpback whale, killer whale, narwhal, polar bear, Arctic tern, walrus
  - Desert: coyote, elf owl, Gila monster, horned lizard, long-tongued bat, rattlesnake, roadrunner
- Lodius' Carving: supporting character, a batlike visage carved into the plinth on which lies the Medallion's central piece, who sings duet with the Medallion to introduce the final riddle.
- The Singers: anthropomorphic animals who perform the song accompanying the ending-credits, describing the Medallion's ownership by Laslow, possession by Lodius, and (in future tense) recapture by the player.

== Reception ==
Mortimer and the Riddles of the Medallion was nominated for several game awards, including an Emmy.
