= Strike Fleet =

1988 video game

- Developers: Lucasfilm Games; Nickel Ltd. (Amiga, ST)
- Publisher: Electronic Arts
- Designer: Noah Falstein
- Programmer: Lawrence Holland
- Artists: Nancy L. Fong; Ken Macklin
- Composers: Tom Tenbroek; Nic Tenbroek
- Platforms: Commodore 64, Apple II, MS-DOS, Amiga, Atari ST
- Release: 1988: C64, Apple II; 1989: MS-DOS; 1991: Amiga, ST
- Genres: Strategy, wargame
- Mode: Single-player

Strike Fleet is a 1988 video game developed by Lucasfilm Games and published by Electronic Arts. It was released for the Amiga, Apple II, Atari ST, Commodore 64, and MS-DOS. Strike Fleet is the unofficial sequel to the war game PHM: Pegasus.

The player controls either the American or British Fleets over the course of ten scenarios, of which the last four can be played as a single campaign. The player must fight against the navy and air force of various other nations including Argentina, the Soviet Union, and Iran.

== Scenarios ==
=== 1. Stark Realities ===
The player's American frigate is on a routine patrol in the Persian Gulf, defending itself and all neutral shipping in the Gulf.

=== 2. The Enemy Below ===
On May 1, 1982, two British frigates were providing ASW coverage for their forces near Port Stanley on the Falkland Islands, when they detected, and were fired upon, by the Argentine sub ARA San Luis. Neither side acknowledged a hit that day. This mission is to search for, and destroy, Argentine submarines that may be in the area.

=== 3. The Road to Kuwait ===
The captain must escort three tankers through the Persian Gulf.

=== 4. Falklands Defense ===
During the Falklands War, the captain must engage and destroy three Argentine frigates.

=== 5. Dire Straits ===
The ship must defend a small convoy of empty oil tankers in the Persian Gulf against speedboats armed with guns and grenades.

=== 6. Atlantic Cork ===
In a World War III scenario, the captain must prevent the Soviet fleet in the Norwegian Sea from travelling through the GIUK gap, sinking enough ships and subs to seriously cripple their forces.

=== 7. Surprise Invasion ===
The captain commands a small task force that is trying to prevent a Soviet invasion fleet from reaching Trondheim, Norway.

=== 8. Escape to New York ===
The captain must make a fast transit to the U.S. east coast, avoiding or defeating Soviet subs, cruisers, and bombers.

=== 9. Wolfpack ===
The captain must escort a convoy of reinforcements to a U.S. base in Iceland.

=== 10. Mopping Up ===
The captain must prevent Soviet ships and submarines from returning to their bases to refuel.

== Bonus scenarios ==
The PC version of the game included two bonus missions.

=== 11. Bunker Hill Blues ===
The captain must defend the ship from attacking forces.

=== 12. One for the Gipper ===
The captain must destroy two oil platforms and one frigate while remaining undamaged.

== Reception ==
Evan Brooks of Computer Gaming World in April 1988 rated Strike Fleet 3.5 stars out of five. He thought that the game improved upon PHM: Pegasus due to the added excitement and variety, while still maintaining quality graphics and historical accuracy. Brooks questioned some decisions regarding the user interface for the bridge and weapons systems. In June 1992 and January 1994 he reiterated his 3.5 stars rating: "Good graphics and game play do much to overcome certain historical inaccuracies ... but switching from bridge-to-bridge to effect changes can be an awkward experience".

Hartley, Patricia, and Kirk Lesser of Dragon rated Strike Fleet five out of five stars in June 1988, stating that Strike Fleet was "a software program you must consider for purchase". They praised its scope, graphics, and documentation, and thought the ten included scenarios offered "hours of intense excitement". The Lessers concluded "LucasFilm is to be heartily congratulated".

Ervin Bobo of Compute! in July 1988 liked Strike Fleet's documentation and "always good without being cluttered" graphics. He concluded: "Although the notion of commanding a fleet of ships may seem daunting, it can be done. Really".

Jack Warner wrote in The Palm Beach Post in November 1988 that Strike Fleet for Apple II was the only game he knew of that successfully portrayed "modern tactical warfare with a live-action feel", and was much better than PHM: Pegasus.

== Reviews ==
- Casus Belli #46 (August 1988)
