= Secret Weapons of the Luftwaffe =

1991 video game

- Developer: Totally Games
- Publisher: Lucasfilm Games
- Director: Lawrence Holland
- Producers: Anthony Garcia; Gregory Hammond
- Designer: Lawrence Holland
- Programmers: Lawrence Holland; Peter Lincroft
- Artists: Martin Cameron; James McLeod
- Composer: Michael Land
- Platforms: MS-DOS, Classic Mac OS
- Release: August 1991
- Genre: Combat flight simulator
- Mode: Single-player

Secret Weapons of the Luftwaffe is a World War II air-combat combat flight simulation game first released in August 1991 by Lucasfilm Games.

It was the last of a trilogy of World War II titles by Lucasfilm Games, the others being Battlehawks 1942 (1988) and Their Finest Hour (1989). It enabled the player to fly aircraft of the USAAF Eighth Air Force and the German Luftwaffe, including some experimental aircraft that did not see operational service during World War II.

The game was initially released with a code wheel and a 225-page manual, detailing the air war over Western Europe between 1943 and 1945. The game also featured a campaign mode, similar to that found in Their Finest Hour, where the player had to make the strategic decisions on which targets were to be attacked (as USAAF 8th Air Force) or defended (by the German Luftwaffe).

Four expansion packs were released: P-38 Lightning (1991), P-80 Shooting Star (1991), Do 335 Pfeil (1992) and He 162 Volksjäger (1992).

== Setting ==
The game focuses battles between the Eighth Air Force and the Luftwaffe challenge during World War II, especially the American strategic bombing offensive against Germany, from August 1943 towards the end of war in 1945. It is focused more on action than on realistic simulation. The game sets up German secret weapons, with fast jet propulsion and a variety of missiles and bombs, against slower but more numerous American piston-engined airplanes.

There are a number of ways to play the game, covering full tours of duty, historical missions, campaign battles as well as a custom mission builder.

=== Tours of Duty ===
In Tours of Duty, the player creates their own pilot (or crew, for B-17 Flying Fortress) and fights in the air war for a limited number of missions (from 25 to 55, according to the historical Squadrons). The pilot/crew gain experience points, ranks and decorations; and if they manage to survive their assigned Tours of Duty, they can start another, without time limitations. The same pilot/crew can be deployed by the player in Campaign Battles, or in Historical Missions or Custom Missions.

=== Historical Missions ===
The game features a numerous set of prebuilt, historically-oriented missions in which the player is free to choose their own pilot and/or crew.

== Mission Builder ==
The Mission Builder allows the user to create missions. The Waves function allows the player to automatically replicate, up to nine times, any planned non-bombing flight; so that it is possible to simulate, for example, several waves of enemy interceptors against a bomber formation, planning a single flight of interceptors and setting the Waves option as desired.

== Campaign Battles ==
SWOTL - 8th USAAF menu screen

SWOTL - German Luftwaffe menu screen

Campaign Battles allow the player to plan missions inside the Campaign Battles, using the mission builder. This feature allows the player plan their own way to fight the air war, without any limitations. Success or defeat are determined by several overall winning/losing conditions.

== Reception ==
Computer Gaming World in 1991 and 1993 gave the game four and a half stars out of five, stating that it "is a welcome addition to Lucasfilm's World War II aerial oeuvre. Graphically rich, stylistically complex and user-accessible, it succeeds on three levels (tactical, operational and strategic)". The magazine gave the expansion disks four stars. In 1992 the magazine named it one of the year's best simulation games.

== Reviews ==
- Fire & Movement #76
