= Their Finest Hour (video game) =

1989 video game

- Developer: Lucasfilm Games
- Publishers: NA: Lucasfilm Games; EU: U.S. Gold
- Designer: Lawrence Holland
- Programmer: Lawrence Holland
- Artists: Martin Cameron; James McLeod
- Writers: Victor Cross; Lawrence Holland
- Platforms: Amiga, Atari ST, MS-DOS
- Release: October 1989
- Genre: Combat flight simulator
- Mode: Single-player

Their Finest Hour: The Battle of Britain is a World War II combat flight simulation game by Lawrence Holland, released in October 1989 for the Amiga, Atari ST and MS-DOS systems. It was the second game in the trilogy of World War II titles by Lucasfilm Games, the others being Battlehawks 1942 (1988) and Secret Weapons of the Luftwaffe (1991). The game was released with a 192-page manual written by Victor Cross, that provided a detailed historical overview of the battle and pilots' perspectives. An expansion pack, Their Finest Missions: Volume One, was released in 1989.

== Gameplay ==
Their Finest Hour is a simulation of the Royal Air Force and German Luftwaffe aircraft during the Battle of Britain from July to September 1940. It offers eight flyable aircraft, two RAF (Supermarine Spitfire, Hawker Hurricane) and six Luftwaffe (Messerschmitt Bf 109 E, Messerschmitt Bf 110 C-4 "Zerstörer", Junkers Ju 87 Stuka, Dornier 17 z-2, Heinkel He 111 H-3, Junkers Ju 88 A-1).

The game pioneered gameplay elements featured in later Lucasfilm releases, such as a mission builder and combat film recorder, the ability to man all the crew positions in a bomber, and a Campaign mode where the historical outcome is decided by the success or failure of the missions flown by the player.

== Reception ==
Their Finest Hour received 5 out of 5 stars from Dragon. STart described it as "a great sequel" to Battlehawks 1942. Stating that "Flying 'Finest Hour' is pure pleasure", the magazine concluded that "for the aviation buff, it's a 'must have.'"

In the June 1990 edition of Games International (Issue 15), Brian Walker admired the packaging, commenting that it was "as handsome as the planes [...] the book (it's not just a manual) that accompanies it sets standards that others will have to be judged against." He noted that "to succeed you'll need to grasp strategy, as well as the joystick." Walker concluded by giving the game a perfect rating of 10 out of 10 for gameplay and 9 out of 10 for graphics, saying, "Though we live in an world of junk [...] there's room for such an outstanding production such as this."

Computer Gaming World stated that the game was "even more amazing" than Battlehawks 1942. It praised the graphics, sound card audio, and documentation, while mildly criticizing the controls when not using a mouse, and concluded that the game would appeal to both action and wargame players. The magazine named it as Action Game of the Year in 1990. In 1991 the magazine named the game to its Hall of Fame for games readers rated highly over time, and a survey of strategy and war games gave it four and a half stars out of five. Another survey in 1993 gave the game four stars out of five. In 1996, the magazine ranked it as the 21st best game of all time, adding that it "reminds us that the great sim can also be a great game."
