= PHM Pegasus =

1986 video game

- Developer: Lucasfilm Games
- Publisher: Electronic Arts
- Designer: Noah Falstein
- Programmer: Noah Falstein
- Artist: Ken Macklin
- Composer: Christopher Grigg
- Platforms: Commodore 64, Apple II, MS-DOS, Amstrad CPC, ZX Spectrum
- Release: 1986
- Genre: Vehicle simulation

PHM Pegasus is a ship simulation and action game released for the Commodore 64, Apple II, MS-DOS, Amstrad CPC, and ZX Spectrum. The title refers to USS Pegasus (PHM-1), one of the Pegasus-class hydrofoils which were used by the U.S. Navy in the 1970s.

The game was developed by Lucasfilm Games and published by Electronic Arts. The game has eight different missions in which players must maneuver helicopters, convoy ships, and patrol hydrofoil missilecrafts to survey areas, clear areas of enemy ships, and escort friendly ships.

Mission locations include the Persian Gulf, the Eastern Mediterranean, the Caribbean, and the Gulf of Sidra. The developers of the game consulted with Boeing Marine Systems, a manufacturer of hydrofoils, to increase the realism of the simulation.

== Gameplay ==
MS-DOS screenshot

PHM Pegasus assigns players to the control of three different types of vehicles: Patrol Hydrofoil Missilecrafts (PHM), Seasprite and Seahawk helicopters, and convoy ships. The first two missions are time-limited where the player controls a PHM and must find nearby enemy crafts using the ship's 40-mile radius radar and sink them using the ship's array of weaponry. Players can fire from a manual maneuvering screen or use a pair of binoculars to identify and aim at ships. Two missions are seek-and-destroy where the player can use two helicopters to locate enemy ships in the Mediterranean and sink them using the PHM. Another mission involves surveillance where players must navigate within 1500 feet of eight tankers suspected of carrying arms to photograph the vessels. The mission does not allow the tankers to be fired upon, so two SeaHawk helicopters must be used to scout the area before approach.

The last two are escort missions: guarding a friendly vessel to its destination. The first involves protecting a convoy as it travels to port through the Caribbean. The second and final mission of the game has the player guarding a supply ship as it makes its way through the Persian Gulf out into the Indian Ocean. Two helicopters are provided and prolonged enemy incursions must be minimized.

== Reception ==
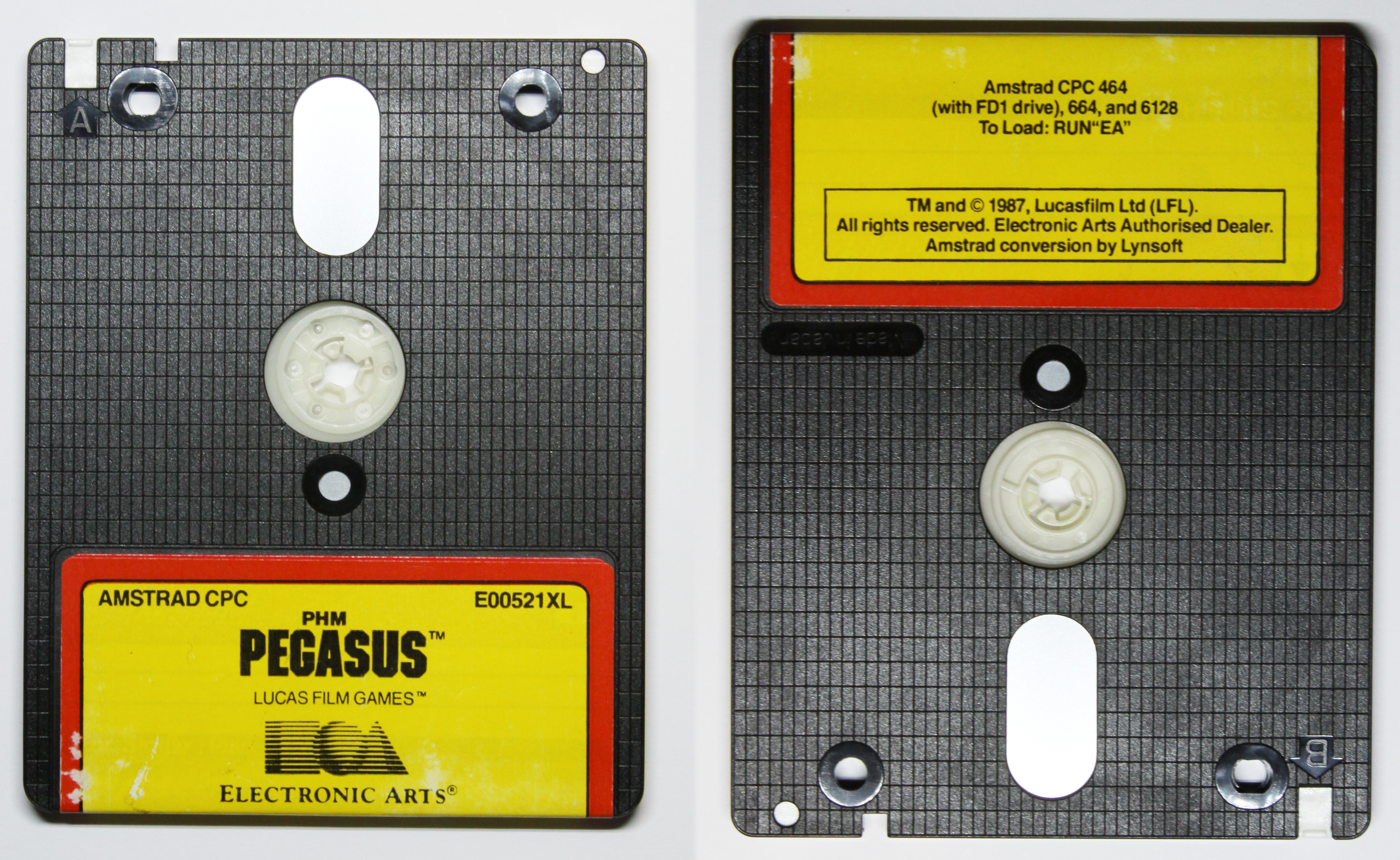
Amstrad CPC 3" floppy disk (front and back)

According to Noah Falstein, PHM Pegasus was Lucasfilm Games' biggest-ever hit at the time of its release, and the company's "first 100,000+ seller".

Compute! called PHM Pegasus "a worthy addition to even the casual game player's collection. It's a must if you are an action fanatic looking for a new challenge". Computer Gaming World consulted with a hydrofoil expert to review PHM Pegasus in 1987. The magazine stated that the game understated damage to the player's ship from missiles, but that the hydrofoil's velocity was realistic; the game also accurately modeled the possibility of shooting down a missile with gunfire. It concluded that "the game has a certain sameness and/or lack of elan which differentiates the truly outstanding product from the merely good one". 1992 and 1994 surveys in the magazine of wargames with modern settings gave the game two and a half stars out of five. The Palm Beach Post stated that PHM: Pegasus was "much less successful" than the later Strike Fleet.
