= Secret Weapons Over Normandy =

2003 video game

- Developer: Totally Games
- Publisher: LucasArts
- Designers: Lawrence Holland; Mike Hawkins; Tony Evans; Jess VanderWalker; Aaron Keppel
- Composer: Michael Giacchino
- Engine: RenderWare
- Platforms: PlayStation 2 Xbox; Microsoft Windows
- Release: NA: November 18, 2003; EU: November 28, 2003
- Genre: Combat flight simulation
- Modes: Single-player, multiplayer

Secret Weapons Over Normandy is a World War II-based combat flight simulation video game released for PlayStation 2, Xbox and Windows in 2003. Developed by Totally Games and published by LucasArts, the game features 15 objective-based missions set in 1940s European, North African and the Pacific theatres of war. The story was written by Derek Chester. The music was composed by Michael Giacchino. The game had downloadable content via Xbox Live that could be played via single-player mode.

== Plot ==
The player assumes the role of James Chase, an American who has volunteered to serve as a fighter pilot in the Royal Air Force starting in May 1940. After displaying above-average skill and bravery during the evacuations at Dunkirk, he is transferred to the Battlehawks: a special unit in the RAF that operates under Prime Minister Winston Churchill's Special Operations Executive. The Battle of Britain, North Africa, China, the Battle of Midway, the Eastern Front, Norway, and Germany are all featured in one or more missions. The final mission of the campaign is on June 6, 1944, with the Battlehawks flying air support as Operation Overlord begins.

The overall goal of the Battlehawks throughout the campaign is to "halt the most insidious plans of the Third Reich". The player's principal opponent is the Luftwaffe, in particular the Battlehawk's counterpart, the elite squadron of top German pilots known as Nemesis (similar to the real KG 200), commanded by Oberst Krieger. The player will also face off against the forces of the Japanese Empire.

== Gameplay ==
The game is almost entirely from a third-person view, with the player's "camera" set to the rear of the plane looking towards it. Fuel is unlimited, but ammunition and mounted ordnance - bombs, torpedoes, or rockets - are not.

In the campaign, the player is often assisted by wingmen. They are friendly pilots who can be ordered to cover Chase's plane, follow it, attack marked units and attack enemy planes. In some missions, it is possible to land on runways and get more ammunition or even change the aircraft. The player can slow down or speed up the time at any moment, but it also removes voice dialogue.

Although most of the gameplay is in the air, certain parts of certain missions are set on the ground and the player must use anti-aircraft weaponry to shoot down enemy planes. The first part of the twelfth mission is in a turret of a Boeing B-17 Flying Fortress bomber, and the player uses machine guns to fight incoming fighters.

During the campaign, the player can play short challenges that often have unique objectives. The story is not affected if these challenges are skipped, but they also follow the same story of the main part of the campaign. Completion of all secondary objectives during a primary mission can result in a promotion or a decoration being awarded. The player, despite being in the Royal Air Force, is given promotions in American, not British, military rank, and the majority of decorations available are American, some of which did not even exist at the time. The two British decorations that can be earned are the highest available - the George Cross and the Victoria Cross - which, if the player earns them, would make James Chase the first to receive both in history.

Throughout the course of the game, the player will have the opportunity to fly many types of World War II aircraft into combat. Most of the aircraft are American, others are British (notably the first few available planes), and the remainder are a handful of German and one Japanese aircraft. Some can be unlocked for multiplayer or single-mission use but not for the campaign, like the Messerschmitt Me 163 Komet, and others are completely unavailable for player use, like the Nakajima B5N and the Heinkel He 111.

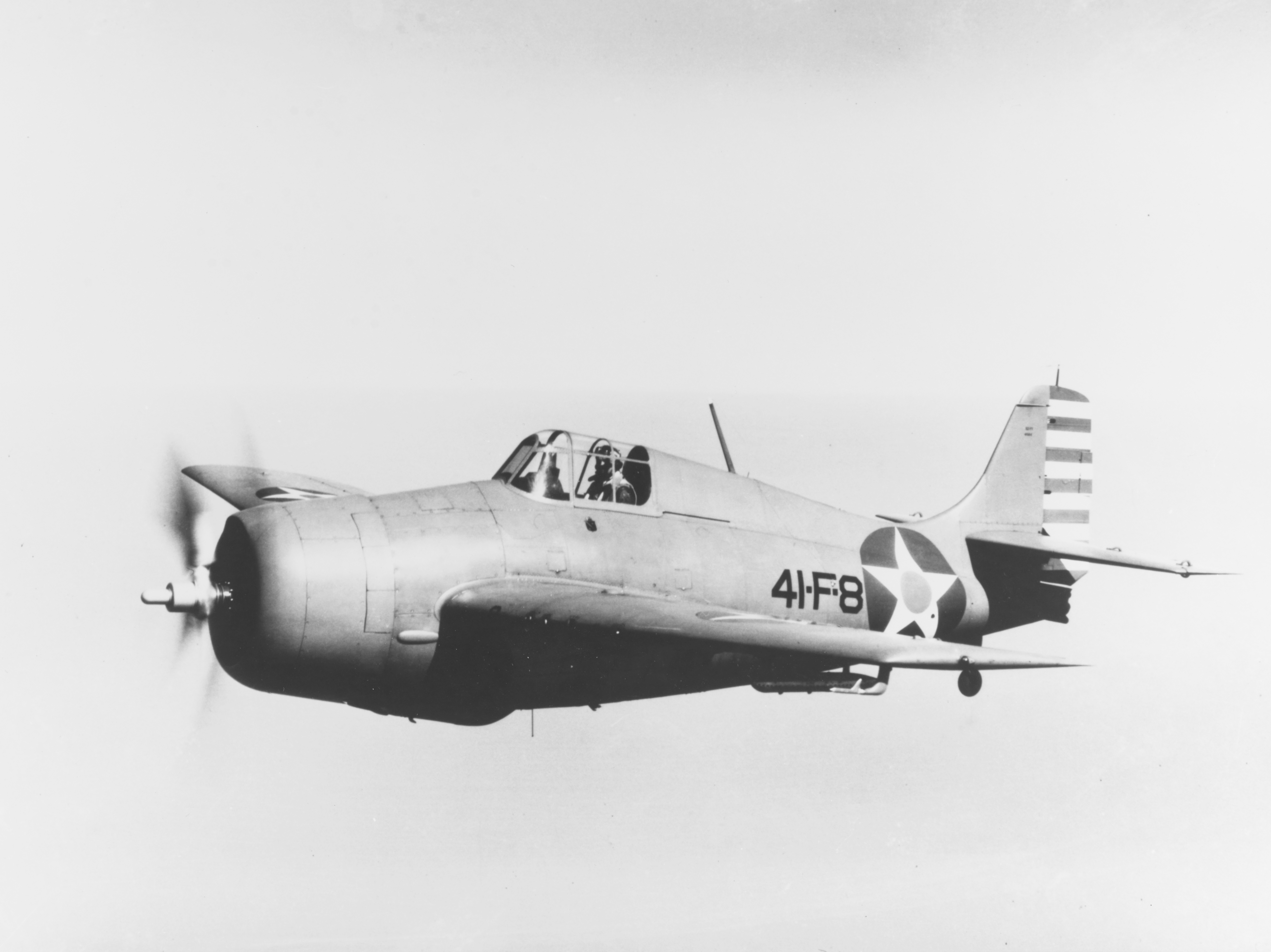
F4F Wildcat

Secret Weapons Over Normandy is notable for the presence of several prototype designs that never flew in combat, or were used in small numbers, among them the XP-55 Ascender, XP-56 Black Bullet, Chance-Vought Flying Pancake, the Junkers Ju 390, and the Daimler Benz C. Also present are several German weapons projects that were either never completed or failed to make a significant impact on the war, such as the Mistel and the Wasserfall missile launcher.

The game features a wide range of actual weapons that were used during World War II. It also features the unlockable TIE Fighter and X-Wing starships from the Star Wars universe in the game's instant action mode.

== Reception ==
Reception

Aggregate score
Aggregator	Score		
Aggregator	PC	PS2	Xbox
Metacritic	72/100	81/100	77/100

Review scores
Publication	Score		
Publication	PC	PS2	Xbox
Edge	N/A	8/10	N/A
Electronic Gaming Monthly	N/A	6.33/10	6.33/10
Eurogamer	N/A	N/A	9/10
Famitsu	N/A	30/40	N/A
Game Informer	N/A	7.5/10	7.5/10
GamePro	N/A	5/5	N/A
GameSpot	6.9/10	6.9/10	6.9/10
GameSpy	3/5	4.5/5	4.5/5
GameZone	8.7/10	9.5/10	N/A
IGN	8/10	8/10	8/10
Official U.S. PlayStation Magazine	N/A	4/5	N/A
Official Xbox Magazine (US)	N/A	N/A	6.9/10
PC Gamer (US)	65%	N/A	N/A
Playboy	75%	75%	75%
The Village Voice	6/10	6/10	6/10

Secret Weapons Over Normandy received "favorable" reviews on all platforms except the PC version, which received "average" reviews, according to the review aggregation website Metacritic.

Steve Butts of IGN praised the sound and gameplay. Kristan Reed of Eurogamer praised the Xbox version, calling it "one of the best kept secrets of the year". Jeff Gerstmann of GameSpot was a little more critical. He praised the simple controls and graphics but noted that they don't excel in any one area, and criticized the lack of challenge. In Japan, where the PS2 version was ported and published by Electronic Arts, Famitsu gave it a score of one eight, two sevens, and one eight for a total of 30 out of 40.

== Soundtrack ==
Secret Weapons Over Normandy: LucasArts Original Soundtrack Recording

Soundtrack album by Michael Giacchino
- Released: December 30, 2003
- Recorded: June 2003
- Studio: Bastyr University, Kenmore, Washington
- Genre: orchestral
- Length: 82:43
- Label: La-La Land Records

Professional ratings
Review scores
Source	Rating
Film Score Monthly	4/5
Game-OST.com	8/10

The game's soundtrack, composed by Medal of Honor's Michael Giacchino and performed by session musicians of the Northwest Sinfonia, was released as a two-CD set by La-La Land Records. The first disc includes the game's main themes, while the second disc features shorter cues and video interviews.
