= List of Star Wars video games =

This is a list of Star Wars video games. This page only includes games developed or published by LucasArts, or officially licensed by Lucasfilm.

== In development ==
=== TBA ===
- Star Wars: Fate of the Old Republic (announced in 2025), Arcanaut Studios
- Star Wars Jedi 3 (announced in 2024), Respawn Entertainment
- Star Wars: Knights of the Old Republic — Remake (announced in 2021) Windows, PlayStation 5, Saber Interactive
- Star Wars: Eclipse (announced in 2021), Quantic Dream

== Episode-related titles ==
The following is a list of Star Wars games that are based on the feature films. They are listed in order of release by film.

=== Episode IV: A New Hope ===
- Star Wars (1983–88) – Arcade
  - Re-released for: Atari 2600, Atari 5200, Commodore 64, Atari 8-bit computers, ColecoVision, BBC Micro, ZX Spectrum, Acorn Electron, Amstrad CPC, Atari ST, Apple II, MS-DOS, Mac, Amiga
- Death Star Interceptor (1984/85, System 3 Software Ltd) (unlicensed) - Commodore 64, ZX Spectrum
- Star Wars (1987) – Famicom
- Star Wars: Attack on the Death Star (1991) – PC-9801, X68000
- Star Wars (1991–93) – NES, Game Boy, Master System, Game Gear
- Super Star Wars (1992) – SNES
  - Re-released for: Wii Virtual Console, PS4, PlayStation Vita
- Star Wars Arcade (1993) – Arcade
  - Re-released for: 32X

=== Episode V: The Empire Strikes Back ===
- Star Wars: The Empire Strikes Back (1982) – Atari 2600, Intellivision
- Star Wars: The Empire Strikes Back (1985/88) – Arcade
  - Re-released for: BBC Micro, Commodore 64, ZX Spectrum, Amstrad CPC, Amiga, Atari ST.
- Star Wars: The Empire Strikes Back (1992) – NES, Game Boy
- Super Star Wars: The Empire Strikes Back (1993) – SNES
  - Re-released for: Wii Virtual Console

=== Episode VI: Return of the Jedi ===
- Star Wars: Return of the Jedi – Death Star Battle (1983/84) – Atari 2600, Atari 8-bit computers, Atari 5200, ZX Spectrum
- Star Wars: Return of the Jedi (1984/88) – Arcade, BBC Micro, Commodore 64, ZX Spectrum, Amstrad CPC, Amiga, Atari ST
- Super Star Wars: Return of the Jedi (1994) – SNES, Game Boy, Game Gear
  - Re-released for: Wii Virtual Console

=== Episode I: The Phantom Menace ===
- Star Wars: Episode I – The Phantom Menace (1999) – Windows, PlayStation
  - Re-released for: PlayStation 4, PlayStation 5 (2024)
- Star Wars Episode I (1999) – Pinball
- Star Wars Episode I: Jedi Power Battles (2000) – PlayStation, Dreamcast, Game Boy Advance
  - Re-released for: Windows (2025), Nintendo Switch (2025), PlayStation 4 & PlayStation 5 (2025), Xbox One & Xbox Series X/S (2025)
- Star Wars Episode I: Battle for Naboo (2000) – Nintendo 64, Microsoft Windows
- Star Wars Episode I: Obi-Wan's Adventures (2000) – Game Boy Color
- Star Wars: Obi-Wan (2001) – Xbox

=== Episode II: Attack of the Clones ===
- Star Wars: The Clone Wars (2002) – GameCube, PlayStation 2, Xbox
- Star Wars: Episode II – Attack of the Clones (2002) – Game Boy Advance
- Star Wars: The New Droid Army (2002) – Game Boy Advance

=== Episode III: Revenge of the Sith ===
- Star Wars: Episode III – Revenge of the Sith (2005) – PlayStation 2, Xbox, Nintendo DS, Game Boy Advance, Mobile Phone
  - Re-released for: PlayStation 3 (2015)

== Series titles ==
The following is a list of Star Wars games that are not based on a particular feature film, and form part of a series. The list is ordered from the oldest series to the latest.

=== X-Wing ===
- Star Wars: X-Wing (1993) – DOS, Macintosh, Windows (X-Wing Collector Series)
  - Expansion(s): Imperial Pursuit (1993) and B-Wing (1993)
    - Compilations: X-Wing (Collector's CD-ROM) (1994), X-Wing Collector Series (1998)
- Star Wars: TIE Fighter (1994) – DOS, Macintosh, Windows (X-Wing Collector Series)
  - Expansion(s): Defender of the Empire (1994)
    - Compilations: TIE Fighter (Collector's CD-ROM) (1995), X-Wing Collector Series (1998)
- Star Wars: X-Wing vs. TIE Fighter (1997) – Windows
  - Expansions: Balance of Power Campaigns (1997), and Flight School (1998)
- Star Wars: X-Wing Alliance (1999) – Windows

=== Rebel Assault ===
- Star Wars: Rebel Assault (1993) DOS, Mac, Sega CD, 3DO
- Star Wars: Rebel Assault II: The Hidden Empire (1995) DOS, PlayStation, Microsoft Windows

=== Jedi Knight ===
- Star Wars: Dark Forces (1995) DOS, Mac, PlayStation
  - Re-released for: Nintendo Switch, Windows, PlayStation 4, PlayStation 5, Xbox One, Xbox Series (2024)
- Star Wars Jedi Knight: Dark Forces II (1997) Windows
  - Expansion(s): Star Wars Jedi Knight: Mysteries of the Sith (1998) Windows
- Star Wars Jedi Knight II: Jedi Outcast (2002) Windows, Mac, Xbox, GameCube
  - Re-released for: Nintendo Switch (2019), PlayStation 4 (2019)
- Star Wars Jedi Knight: Jedi Academy (2003) Windows, Mac, Xbox
  - Re-released for: Nintendo Switch (2020), PlayStation 4 (2020)

=== Rogue Squadron ===
- Star Wars: Rogue Squadron (1998) Windows, Nintendo 64
- Star Wars Rogue Squadron II: Rogue Leader (2001) GameCube
- Star Wars Rogue Squadron III: Rebel Strike (2003) GameCube

=== Racer ===
- Star Wars Episode I: Racer (1999) – Windows, Mac, Dreamcast, Nintendo 64, Game Boy Color
  - Re-released for: Nintendo Switch (2020), PlayStation 4 (2020), Xbox One (2020)
- Star Wars: Racer Arcade (2000) – Arcade
- Star Wars Racer Revenge (2002) – PlayStation 2
  - Re-released for: PlayStation 4 (2015, 2019)
- Star Wars: Galactic Racer (2026) – Windows, PlayStation 5, Xbox Series X/S, Fuse Games

=== Galactic Battlegrounds ===
- Star Wars: Galactic Battlegrounds (2001) Windows, Mac
  - Expansion(s): Star Wars: Galactic Battlegrounds: Clone Campaigns (2002) Windows, Mac

=== Starfighter ===
- Star Wars: Starfighter (2001) PlayStation 2, Xbox, Windows, Arcade
  - Star Wars: Starfighter Special Edition (2001) Xbox
  - Star Wars: Starfighter (2003) Arcade
- Star Wars: Jedi Starfighter (2002) PlayStation 2, Xbox

=== Knights of the Old Republic ===
- Star Wars: Knights of the Old Republic (2003) Xbox, Windows, Mac
  - Re-released for: iOS (2013), Android (2014), Nintendo Switch (2021)
- Star Wars: Knights of the Old Republic II: The Sith Lords (2004) Xbox, Windows
  - Re-released for: Linux, MacOS (2015), Android, iOS (2020), Nintendo Switch (2022)
- Star Wars: The Old Republic (2011) (MMORPG) Windows
  - Expansion(s): Rise of the Hutt Cartel (2013), Galactic Starfighter (2014), Galactic Strongholds (2014), Shadow of Revan (2014), Knights of the Fallen Empire (2015), Knights of the Eternal Throne (2016), Onslaught (2019) and Legacy of the Sith (2022)

=== Galaxies ===
- Star Wars Galaxies: An Empire Divided (2003) Windows (Shutdown)
  - Expansion(s): Star Wars Galaxies: Jump to Lightspeed (2004), Star Wars Galaxies: Episode III Rage of the Wookiees (2005), Star Wars Galaxies: Trials of Obi-Wan (2005),

Compilation(s): Star Wars Galaxies: Starter Kit (2005), Star Wars Galaxies: The Total Experience (2005), and Star Wars Galaxies: The Complete Online Adventures (2006)

=== Battlefront ===
The Battlefront series has been handled by four different developers.

- Pandemic Studios
  - Star Wars: Battlefront (2004) – PlayStation 2, Windows, Xbox, Mac, Mobile Phone
  - Star Wars: Battlefront II (2005) – PlayStation 2, Windows, Xbox, PlayStation Portable
    - Re-released for: Nintendo Switch, PlayStation 4, PlayStation 5, Windows, Xbox One, and Xbox Series X and S (2024)
- Rebellion Developments
  - Star Wars Battlefront: Renegade Squadron (2007) – PlayStation Portable
  - Star Wars Battlefront: Elite Squadron (2009) – PlayStation Portable, Nintendo DS
- THQ Interactive
  - Star Wars Battlefront: Mobile Squadrons (2009) – Mobile Phone
- EA DICE
  - Star Wars Battlefront (2015) – PlayStation 4, Windows, Xbox One
  - Star Wars Battlefront II (2017) – PlayStation 4, Windows, Xbox One

=== Empire at War ===
- Star Wars: Empire at War (2006) Windows, Mac OS X
  - Expansion(s): Star Wars: Empire at War: Forces of Corruption (2006) Windows

Compilation: Star Wars: Empire at War: Gold Pack (game and expansion package) (2007) Windows

=== The Force Unleashed ===
- Star Wars: The Force Unleashed (2008) Windows, Mac OS, Xbox 360, PlayStation 3, PlayStation 2, PlayStation Portable, Wii, Nintendo DS, iOS, N-Gage (service)
  - Re-released for: Nintendo Switch (2022)
  - Star Wars: The Force Unleashed – Ultimate Sith Edition (2009) Windows, Mac OS, Xbox 360, PlayStation 3
- Star Wars: The Force Unleashed II (2010) Windows, Xbox 360, PlayStation 3, Wii, Nintendo DS, iOS

=== The Clone Wars ===
• Star Wars: The Clone Wars (2002 video game) (2002) - GameCube, PlayStation 2, Xbox

- Star Wars: The Clone Wars – Lightsaber Duels (2008) – Wii
- Star Wars: The Clone Wars – Jedi Alliance (2008) – Nintendo DS
- Star Wars: The Clone Wars – Republic Heroes (2009) – Windows, Xbox 360, PlayStation 3, PlayStation 2, PlayStation Portable, Wii, Nintendo DS
- Clone Wars Adventures (2010) – Windows, Mac (Shutdown)

=== Jedi ===
- Star Wars Jedi: Fallen Order (2019) – Windows, PlayStation 4, Xbox One, Stadia, PlayStation 5, Xbox Series X/S
- Star Wars Jedi: Survivor (2023) – Windows, PlayStation 4, Xbox One, PlayStation 5, Xbox Series X/S

== Stand-alone titles ==
The following is a list of stand-alone Star Wars games that do not form part of a series, released primarily for consoles, personal computers, handhelds and arcade. The titles are grouped together depending on the decade in which they were released.

=== 1980s ===
- Star Wars: Jedi Arena (1983) – Atari 2600
- Star Wars: Droids (1988) – Amstrad CPC, ZX Spectrum

=== 1990s ===
- Star Wars: Shadows of the Empire (1996) – Nintendo 64, Windows
- Star Wars: Masters of Teräs Käsi (1997) – PlayStation
- Star Wars: Yoda Stories (1997) – Windows
  - Re-released for: Game Boy Color (1999)
- Star Wars: Rebellion (Star Wars: Supremacy – UK) (1998) – Windows
- Star Wars Trilogy Arcade (1998) – Arcade
- Star Wars Millennium Falcon CD-ROM Playset (1998) – Windows

=== 2000s ===
- Star Wars: Force Commander (2000) – Windows
- Star Wars: Demolition (2000) – PlayStation, Dreamcast
  - Re-released for: PlayStation 4, PlayStation 5 (2023)
- Star Wars: Super Bombad Racing (2001) – PlayStation 2
- Star Wars: Bounty Hunter (2002) – PlayStation 2, GameCube
  - Re-released for: PlayStation 3 (2015), PlayStation 4 (2016), Nintendo Switch (2024), Windows (2024), PlayStation 4 & PlayStation 5 (2024), Xbox One & Xbox Series X/S (2024)
- Star Wars: Flight of the Falcon (2003) – Game Boy Advance
- Star Wars Trilogy: Apprentice of the Force (2004) – Game Boy Advance
- Star Wars: Republic Commando (2005) – Xbox, Windows
  - Re-released for: Nintendo Switch (2021), PlayStation 4 (2021)
- Star Wars: Lethal Alliance (2006) – PlayStation Portable, Nintendo DS

=== 2010s ===
- Star Wars Battle Pod (2014) – Arcade

=== 2020s ===
- Star Wars: Squadrons (2020) – Windows, PlayStation 4, Xbox One
- Star Wars: Hunters (2024) – Nintendo Switch, iOS, Android
- Star Wars Outlaws (2024) – Windows, PlayStation 5, Xbox Series X/S, Nintendo Switch 2 (2025)
- Star Wars Zero Company (2026) – PlayStation 5, Xbox Series X/S, Windows

== Virtual reality ==
- Vader Immortal (2019) – Oculus Rift, Oculus Quest, PlayStation VR
- Star Wars: Tales from the Galaxy's Edge (2020) – Oculus Quest
  - Star Wars: Tales from the Galaxy's Edge – Last Call (2021) – Oculus Quest
  - Star Wars: Tales from the Galaxy's Edge - Enhanced Edition (2023) – PlayStation VR2
- Star Wars: Beyond Victory (2025) – Meta Quest 3, Meta Quest 3S

== Miscellaneous games ==
The following games are grouped together because they share the same genre, rather than because they are officially part of the same series. Excluded are the games listed above.

=== Table top ===
- Star Wars Chess (1993) – DOS, Sega CD, Windows
- Monopoly Star Wars (1997) – Windows
- Monopoly: Star Wars Heroes vs. Villains (2026) – Windows, PlayStation 5, Xbox Series X/S, Nintendo Switch, Nintendo Switch 2

=== Pinball ===
Star Wars Pinball (2013) Windows, Mac, Wii U, Xbox 360, 3DS, PSVita, PlayStation 3, PlayStation 4, Kindle Fire, Android, iOS

- Star Wars Episode V: The Empire Strikes Back (2013)
- Star Wars: The Clone Wars (2013)
- Star Wars Pinball: Boba Fett

Star Wars Pinball: Balance of the Force (2013) Xbox 360, PSVita, PlayStation 3, PlayStation 4, Android, iOS

- Star Wars Episode VI: Return of the Jedi (2013)
- Star Wars Pinball: Darth Vader
- Star Wars Pinball: Starfighter Assault

Star Wars Pinball: Heroes Within (2014) Xbox 360, PSVita, PS3, PS4, Android, iOS

- Star Wars Pinball: Masters of the Force
- Star Wars Episode IV: A New Hope (2013)
- Star Wars Pinball: Droids
- Star Wars Pinball: Han Solo

Star Wars Pinball: Star Wars Rebels (2015)

Star Wars Pinball: The Force Awakens (2016)

- Star Wars Pinball: Star Wars: Resistance
- Star Wars Pinball: Might of the First Order

Star Wars Pinball: Rogue One (2017)

Star Wars Pinball: The Last Jedi (2018)

- Star Wars Pinball: Ahch-To Island
- Star Wars Pinball: The Last Jedi - Survive

Star Wars Pinball: Solo Pack (2018)

- Star Wars Pinball: Solo
- Star Wars Pinball: Calrissian Chronicles
- Star Wars Pinball: Battle of Mimban

A twentieth pinball table, based on the first season of The Mandalorian, was announced to be in development in late October of 2020 and due for a spring 2021 release.

=== Educational ===
Developed by Lucas Learning:

- Star Wars: Yoda's Challenge
- Star Wars: The Gungan Frontier
- Star Wars: Droid Works (1999) Windows, Mac
- Star Wars: Pit Droids Windows, iOS
- Star Wars Math: Jabba's Game Galaxy (Developed by Argonaut Games)
- Star Wars: JarJar's Journey Adventure Book
- Star Wars: Anakin's Speedway
- Star Wars: Early Learning Activity Center

Other educational:

- Star Wars: Jedi Math (2008) (Educational) Leapster
- Star Wars: Jedi Reading (2008) (Educational) Leapster
- Star Wars: The Clone Wars (2008) (Platform/Educational) Didj
- Star Wars: Jedi Trials (2009) Didj

=== Jakks Pacific- Plug It In & Play TV Games ===
- Star Wars: Lightsaber Battle Game (2005) Handheld TV game
- Star Wars: Revenge of the Sith (2005) – Jakks Pacific TV Game
  - Star Wars GameKey (expansion) (2006)
- Star Wars: Original Trilogy (2007) Jakks Pacific TV Game
- Star Wars: Republic Squadron (2009) Jakks Pacific TV Game

=== Non-video game PC software ===
- Star Wars Screen Entertainment (1994) (Screensaver) – Windows, Macintosh
- Star Wars: Behind the Magic (1998) (CD-ROM encyclopedia) – Windows, Macintosh
- Star Wars Episode I: Insider's Guide (1999) – Windows, Macintosh

=== Kinect Motion Sensor ===
- Kinect Star Wars (2012) (Kinect) Xbox 360

=== Mobile and smartphones ===
The following is a list of Star Wars titles that are only for mobile operating systems.

- Star Wars: Battle For The Republic (2005) – Mobile Phone
- Star Wars: Grievous Getaway (2005) – Mobile Phone
- Star Wars: Battle Above Coruscant (2005) – Mobile Phone
- Star Wars: Republic Commando: Order 66 (2005) – Mobile Phone
- Star Wars: Lightsaber Combat (2005) – Mobile Phone
- Star Wars Trivia (2005) – Mobile Phone
- Star Wars: Ask Yoda (2005) – Mobile Phone
- Star Wars: Puzzle Blaster (2005) – Mobile Phone
- Star Wars: Jedi Assassin (2005) – Mobile Phone
- Star Wars Imperial Ace 3D (2006) – Mobile Phone
- Star Wars Cantina (2010) – iOS
- Star Wars: Trench Run (2009) – iOS
- Star Wars: The Battle for Hoth (2010) – iOS, Windows Phone
- Star Wars Arcade: Falcon Gunner (2010) – iOS
- Star Wars: Imperial Academy (2011) – iOS
- Star Wars: Force Collection (2013) – Android, iOS
- Star Wars: Tiny Death Star (2013) – Android, iOS, Windows Phone
- Star Wars: Assault Team (2014) – Android, iOS, Windows Phone
- Star Wars: Commander (2014) – Android, iOS, Windows Phone
- Star Wars: Galactic Defense (2014) – Android, iOS
- Star Wars Journeys: The Phantom Menace (2014) – iOS
- Star Wars Journeys: Beginnings (2014) – iOS
- Star Wars: Galaxy of Heroes (2015) – Android, iOS
- Star Wars: Uprising (2015) – Android, iOS
- Star Wars: Heroes Path (2015) – iOS
- Star Wars Rebels: Recon Missions (2015) – Android, iOS, Windows Phone
- Star Wars: Card Trader (2015) – Android, iOS
- Star Wars: Force Arena (2017) – Android, iOS
- Star Wars: Puzzle Droids (2017) – Android, iOS
- Star Wars: Jedi Challenges (2017) – Android, iOS

=== Internet Browser games ===
StarWars.com

- Carbon Connection (2003)
- Force Flight (2003)
- Garbage Masher (2003)
- Planetary Forces (2003)
- Sharpshooter Clone Training (2008)
- Live Fire (2008)
- Clones vs. Droids (2008)
- Ewok Village (2012)

Disney.com

- Star Wars Rebels: Ghost Raid – StarWars.com, Disney.com (2014)
- Star Wars Rebels: Rebel Strike – Disney.com (2014)

=== Compilations ===
- The LucasArts Archives (1995 – 1998)
- Star Wars: The Best of PC (2006)

== Crossovers ==
In some cases, Lucasfilm has allowed other video game franchises to do their own Star Wars games, resulting in crossover hybrid franchises.

=== Lego Star Wars ===
Lego made video games based on their Lego Star Wars toys, as part of their Lego video games franchise.

Lego main series

- Lego Star Wars: The Video Game (2005): Windows, Mac, PlayStation 2, Xbox, GameCube, Game Boy Advance
- Lego Star Wars II: The Original Trilogy (2006): Windows, Mac, PlayStation 2, PlayStation Portable, Xbox 360, Xbox, GameCube, Game Boy Advance
  - Compilation(s): Lego Star Wars: The Complete Saga (2007) includes Lego Star Wars: The Video Game, and Lego Star Wars II: The Original Trilogy. Windows, Mac, Xbox 360, PlayStation 3, Wii, Nintendo DS, iOS, Android
- Lego Star Wars III: The Clone Wars (2011): Windows, Mac, Xbox 360, PlayStation 3, PlayStation Portable, 3DS, Wii, Nintendo DS
- Lego Star Wars: The Force Awakens (2016): Windows, Mac, PlayStation 4, PlayStation 3, PlayStation Vita, Xbox One, Xbox 360, Wii U, Nintendo 3DS, iOS
- Lego Star Wars: The Skywalker Saga (2022): Windows, PlayStation 4, PlayStation 5, Xbox One, Xbox Series X, Nintendo Switch

Mobile game and web browser

- Lego Star Wars: The Quest for R2-D2 (2009): Unity
- Lego Star Wars: Ace Assault (2011) – Windows
- Lego Star Wars: Ace Assault 2 (2012) – Windows
- Lego Star Wars: Battle Orders (2012) – Unity
- Lego Star Wars: The Yoda Chronicles (2013) – Android, iOS
- Lego Star Wars: The New Yoda Chronicles (2014) – Android, iOS
- Lego Star Wars: Microfighters (2014) – Android, iOS
- Lego Star Wars Battles (2021) – Apple Arcade
- Lego Star Wars: Castaways (2021) – Apple Arcade

Lego Indiana Jones

- Lego Indiana Jones: The Original Adventures (2008), LucasArts – Action-adventure game featuring unlockable Han Solo and cameos from other Star Wars characters. Wii, Nintendo DS, Xbox 360, PlayStation 3, PlayStation 2, PlayStation Portable, Windows
- Lego Indiana Jones 2: The Adventure Continues (2009), LucasArts – Action-adventure game featuring cameos from Star Wars characters. Wii, Nintendo DS, Xbox 360, PlayStation 3, PlayStation Portable, Windows

=== Angry Birds Star Wars ===
- Angry Birds Star Wars (2012) Android, iOS, Windows, Nintendo 3DS, PlayStation 3, PlayStation Vita, Wii, Wii U, Xbox 360, PlayStation 4, Xbox One
- Angry Birds Star Wars II (2013) Android, iOS

=== Roblox ===
- Star Wars (2014-2019): Windows, Xbox One, Xbox One S, IOS, Android, Oculus Rift (VR) - Sponsors and events for Star Wars Rebels, Rogue One, The Last Jedi, Solo, and The Rise of Skywalker, which contained objectives with in-game virtual prizes (accessories and gears) attached to the events' respective games, as well as free items in the Catalog (currently known as the Avatar Shop) for 1 ticket or for free.

List of sponsors:

- Star Wars Rebels: Season One (2014)
- Star Wars Rebels: Season Two (2015)

List of events:

- Universe (2016) - Sponsored by Rogue One: A Star Wars Story
- Space Battle (2017) - Sponsored by Star Wars: The Last Jedi
- Battle Arena (2018) - Sponsored by Solo: A Star Wars Story
- Galactic Speedway Creator Challenge (2019) - Sponsored by Star Wars: The Rise of Skywalker

Additional notes:

- Besides the main events, a Disney XD crossover event known as Summer Camp (2015) included a virtual prize of the Star Wars Rebels character, Chopper, in the form of a tiny shoulder pal.
  - The event also included promotional billboards of the Star Wars Rebels TV series in the maps of the events' respective games.
- Similarly to Summer Camp (2015), Disney Infinity 3.0 was also featured as a sponsored event in 2015, and had the maps decorated in the games that were part of the event that included promotional billboards that featured the characters Princess Leia, Darth Vader, Yoda, Anakin Skywalker and Sabine Wren.
  - While the characters were advertised in billboards in the events' respective games, none of the actual virtual prizes or free items tied directly into any Star Wars media.
- As part of the sponsor, Star Wars Rebels: Season Two not only included free items, but was also featured on the promotional material of the billboards in the maps of two pre-existing games on the platform, and also included the limited-time branding on the games' respective thumbnails.

=== Disney Infinity ===
The Disney Infinity series allowed the use of Star Wars characters alongside characters from other franchises owned by Disney, including characters from the Marvel and Pixar films.

- Disney Infinity 3.0 (2015): Microsoft Windows, PlayStation 3, PlayStation 4, Xbox 360, Xbox One, Wii U, iOS, Android

=== Disney Magic Kingdoms ===
The world builder game Disney Magic Kingdoms includes an area based on Star Wars: Galaxy's Edge (included in 2019), along with several playable characters from Star Wars, as well as some attractions based on locations and vehicles from the franchise.

=== The Sims ===
- The Sims 4: Journey to Batuu (2020): Microsoft Windows, Mac, PlayStation 4, Xbox One - Ninth game pack for The Sims 4. Adds a new destination world called Batuu with a Star Wars-style storyline. Adds new types of aliens and other Star Wars-inspired outfits, objects and characters.

=== Minecraft ===
- Minecraft Star Wars (2020): Windows, PlayStation 4, Xbox One, Nintendo Switch, Amazon Kindle Fire, Amazon Fire TV, IOS, Android, Oculus Rift, Gear VR - DLC for Minecraft: Bedrock Edition purchasable through the Minecraft Market place. Adds Star Wars maps, quests, mobs, skins, items and vehicles from the Original Trilogy and The Mandalorian into the game.

=== PowerWash Simulator ===
- PowerWash Simulator 2: Star Wars Pack (2026): Windows, PlayStation 5, Xbox Series X/S, Nintendo Switch 2 - DLC expansion for the simulation video game PowerWash Simulator 2, developed by FuturLab. The game is set during the events of the original Star Wars trilogy. In the expansion, players control P0-W2, a Class Five cleaning droid equipped with a specialized water blaster. The campaign features six iconic franchise environments, allowing players to wash down various spaceships and legendary settings either solo or through online co-op.

== Cultural impact ==
This category refers to video games from other franchises where the inclusion of Star Wars characters is very minor and restricted only to small Easter eggs or unlockable character cameos.

- Night Shift (1990) – Platform game featuring action figures of various Star Wars characters. Amiga, Atari ST, Commodore 64, Mac, PC, Amstrad CPC, ZX Spectrum
- Tony Hawk's Pro Skater series:
  - Tony Hawk's Pro Skater 3 (2001) – Skateboarding game featuring unlockable Darth Maul. Nintendo GameCube, Xbox, PlayStation 2, PC
  - Tony Hawk's Pro Skater 4 (2002) – Skateboarding game featuring unlockable Jango Fett. Nintendo GameCube, Xbox, PlayStation 2, PC
- Secret Weapons Over Normandy (2003) – Flight simulation game featuring unlockable X-wing and TIE Fighter. Xbox, PlayStation 2, PC
- Mercenaries: Playground of Destruction (2005) – Features unlockable character Han Solo. Xbox, PlayStation 2
- Soulcalibur IV (2008) – Fighting game. At release featuring Darth Vader exclusively in the PlayStation 3 version, with Yoda exclusively in the Xbox 360 version, and Darth Vader's apprentice Galen Starkiller Marek in both versions. Months after the release, Darth Vader and Yoda were made available for purchase as downloadable content, each at the version they were absent at release. Each of the Star Wars characters had his own ending on the "Story Mode". However, in late 2016, all DLC in Soulcalibur IV was removed from the PlayStation and Microsoft stores due to licensing from the purchase of Star Wars by Disney.
- Indiana Jones and the Staff of Kings (2009) – Action-adventure game featuring unlockable Han Solo. Wii, PlayStation 2, Nintendo DS, PlayStation Portable

== Canceled games ==
Games that were never finished, nor released.

- Star Wars: Return of the Jedi – Ewok Adventure (1983) – Atari 2600
- Proteus (MMORPG) - Console
- Star Wars Episode VII: Shadows of the Sith
- Star Wars: Imperial Commando (FPS)
- Star Wars: Smuggler – Cross-platform
- Vernost – Windows
- Star Wars: Jedi Knight III: Brink of Darkness
- Star Wars: Battlefront III (2008) (First/third-person shooter) – PlayStation 3, Windows, Xbox 360
- Star Wars: Battlefront IV (First/third-person shooter)
- Shadow of the Sith
- Star Wars: First Assault (2012) (First-person shooter)
- Star Wars: Knights of the Old Republic III – Windows, Xbox 360
- Star Wars 1313 (2013) (Action-adventure) – Windows, PlayStation 4, Xbox One
- Star Wars Outpost (2013)
- Star Wars: Attack Squadrons (2014) – Browser
- Star Wars Scene Maker: Rebels (2015) – iOS
- Battle of the Sith Lords (2015) (Action-adventure) – Windows, Xbox 360, PlayStation 3, Wii U
- Star Wars: The Force Unleashed III (Action-adventure) – Windows, Wii U, Xbox One, PlayStation 4
- Project Ragtag – Windows, Xbox One, PlayStation 4
- Star Wars Rivals – Mobile
- Star Wars: Rise to Power – Android
