= Rebel Assault (disambiguation) =

Rebel Assault may refer to:

- Star Wars: Rebel Assault
- Star Wars: Rebel Assault II: The Hidden Empire
- "Rebel Assault" (Star Wars Rebels)
