= Star Wars: X-Wing Alliance =

1999 video game

- Developer: Totally Games
- Publisher: LucasArts
- Designer: Lawrence Holland
- Series: Star Wars: X-Wing
- Platform: Windows
- Release: NA: March 23, 1999; EU: March 26, 1999
- Genre: Space simulation
- Modes: Single-player, multiplayer

Star Wars: X-Wing Alliance is a 1999 space simulation video game, the sequel to both Star Wars: TIE Fighter and Star Wars: X-Wing vs. TIE Fighter. X-Wing Alliance presents the story of the Azzameen family, a family of space traders. The player assumes the role of Ace Azzameen, the youngest of the Azzameen children, juggling military duty as a fighter pilot for the Rebel Alliance, and allegiance to his family, flying larger heavily armed freighters for the family business, amid a bloody family feud and in the larger context of a galactic civil war. It received favorable reviews.

== Features ==
Screenshot featuring the second Death Star, the cockpit of the Millennium Falcon, and a few starships and starfighters.

Apart from the usual badges and medals for winning missions – a feature shared by the other games of the X-Wing computer game series – progress is also indicated by the number of souvenirs collected in Ace's room. There is also a "mail" delivery between missions that helps to evolve Ace's background story while also providing a deeper look into his personal relationships and his family's whereabouts.

XWA is the first game of the series to offer a full voiceover soundtrack and full in-flight dialogue. Flight control is marginally updated from the previous games of the series, allowing the player to link different energy weapons to fire together, as well as the addition of rudder support. Graphics are also overhauled in this game; high resolution textures, more complex models, and full three dimensional cockpits were added. However, the cockpits are not faithful to the other games; indicators and screens are separated from the cockpit, depicted as floating windows as part of the in-flight heads-up display. The player also has three "mission skips" that allow them to proceed through the linear storyline without having to complete a particular mission. "Family missions," however, cannot be skipped.

The ability to fly multi-crew craft like the Millennium Falcon was a major new feature because the player could freely choose to be the pilot or operate one of the turrets. The AI would take over any position not controlled by the player, but could be given orders by the player. X-Wing Alliance also introduced multi-part missions that involved making hyperjumps from one region to the next; in previous games, any hyperjumps the player experienced were either to start or end the mission. Additionally, players could now enter a starship's hangar bay to rearm and/or receive repairs before rejoining the fight. They could even witness the battle continuing to unfold outside the hangar. Finally, X-Wing Alliance added a much-desired custom mission builder feature. This allowed players to quickly set up a variety of battle scenarios involving almost every vessel in the game, including dozens of fighters and combat transports that had been fought against in the single-player game and were now flyable in this mode. this included various fighters and also larger spacecraft.

== Story ==
The game's prologue (and tutorial) concerns Ace's "family missions" in which his elder family members and Emkay instruct him in the flying of Corellian transports so that he can begin working for the family.

These missions reveal that the Azzameen family are in heated competition with the Viraxo and are generally sympathetic to the Rebel Alliance. Due to their sympathies, the patriarch of the family, Tomaas Azzameen, smuggles bacta for the Alliance in the aftermath of the Battle of Hoth. This causes them to pay dearly as the Galactic Empire raids their home station for running bacta to an Alliance outpost. Tomaas and Ace's older brother are killed and the family subsequently seeks asylum with a Rebel task force.

As a Rebel pilot, Ace participates in a variety of missions for the Rebellion while also helping his family fight the Viraxo. During his tour with the Rebel Alliance, he proves himself to be a significant pilot as he participates in missions that uncover new Imperial projects, such as experimental TIE fighters and the second Death Star.

Some events connect the game to the movies The Empire Strikes Back and Return of the Jedi, such as sequences that track the Rebellion's situation after the Battle of Hoth, as well as the theft of the shuttle Tydirium. The game also concludes with the climactic Battle of Endor. Several events connect to the Star Wars: Shadows of the Empire story, such as a mission to assist Dash Rendar in the capture of the Imperial freighter Suprosa, which carries the plans to the second Death Star.

== Release ==
Star Wars: X-Wing Alliance was released in 1999, and it was released on Steam and GOG.com in 2015 along with other games in the series.

== Reception ==
Reception

Aggregate score
Aggregator	Score
GameRankings	84%

Review scores
Publication	Score
CNET Gamecenter	9/10
Computer Games Strategy Plus	4.5/5
Computer Gaming World	3.5/5
Edge	8/10
Game Informer	8.5/10
GamePro	4.5/5
GameRevolution	A−
GameSpot	8.4/10
IGN	8.2/10
PC Accelerator	6/10
PC Gamer (US)	92%

The game received favorable reviews according to the review aggregation website GameRankings.

Tal Blevins of IGN praised the ability to hyperjump from area to area and the space battles for being much larger than the game's predecessors, with up to 96 ships in space. He also praised the game's graphics and called the game "the best-looking Star Wars title from Totally Games", but criticized its software mode when 3D hardware mode is set off. Blevins felt that the game's improved details added cinematic elements that make players feel as if they are Rebels fighting in a never-to-be-released movie.

The game's sales reached 143,371 copies in the U.S. during 1999.

The game was a finalist for the Academy of Interactive Arts & Sciences' "Computer Simulation Game of the Year" award, which ultimately went to Microsoft Flight Simulator 2000. It was also nominated for CNET Gamecenter's "Best Sci-Fi Simulation" award and for PC PowerPlay's "Best Fantasy Sim" award, but lost both to MechWarrior 3. Likewise, the game was nominated for Computer Gaming World's 1999 "Science Fiction Simulator of the Year" award, which went to Freespace 2.
