= Star Wars: X-Wing (video game series) =

- Genre: Space combat simulation
- Developers: LucasArts; Totally Games
- Publishers: LucasArts; Disney Interactive Studios
- Platforms: MS-DOS, Classic Mac OS, Windows, Linux
- First release: Star Wars: X-Wing; February 1993
- Latest release: Star Wars: X-Wing Alliance; February 28, 1999
- Parent series: Star Wars video games

Star Wars: X-Wing is a series of space combat simulation video games based in the Star Wars media franchise. The series began with Star Wars: X-Wing released in 1993 for MS-DOS. The games simulate the fictional experience of starfighter combat, while remaining faithful to the movies. The player takes the role of a pilot of the Rebel Alliance, and, in later games, the Galactic Empire. To complete the games, players must complete missions such as simple dogfights with opposition starfighters, reconnaissance and inspection tasks, escort duty for freighters or capital ships, or attacks on larger opposition ships. In addition to dogfighting designed to resemble the free-wheeling duels of World War I, the player must also manage power resources and wingmen.

LucasArts later released the Star Wars: Rogue Squadron series which also feature the X-wing fighter however these are arcade-style action video games geared towards consoles with their gamepads, in contrast to the X-Wing series which are traditional flight simulators for the PC which is meant to be played with a joystick.

In 2020, Electronic Arts and EA Motive released Star Wars: Squadrons, another arcade-style action video game that included multiplayer and virtual reality features.

== Games ==
The first game in the series, Star Wars: X-Wing, and the last, X-Wing Alliance, feature as their concluding missions recreations of the attacks on the first and second Death Star, respectively, and are also named after the eponymous vessel. In 1994, X-Wing won the Origins Award for Best Fantasy or Science Fiction Computer Game of 1993.

Most of the games feature voiced (this was quite unusual in the days of the first two games, X-Wing and TIE Fighter) and hand-drawn (along with occasional rendered) cutscenes at crucial points in the storyline. They also feature music from the original trilogy (Star Wars, The Empire Strikes Back, and Return of the Jedi) that responds to the player's actions thanks to the iMUSE system.

=== X-Wing ===
The floppy disk release for X-Wing.

X-Wing (1993) begins a few months prior to A New Hope and involves helping the Rebel Alliance with salvage, gathering intelligence, and ambushing Imperial forces. The second tour is driven mostly by the interception of the Death Star plans by secretly modified Imperial communication satellites, which prompts the player to help deliver the plans to Princess Leia Organa and eventually stop the Death Star at the Battle of Yavin. The third tour shows the Rebel Alliance desperate to discover the location of the Death Star while the plans are en route to the Rebel Alliance High Command.

The expansion packs – Imperial Pursuit and B-Wing – focus on helping the Rebel fleet evacuate Yavin IV after the destruction of the Death Star, along with protecting the Rebel fleet while searching for a new base. The game concludes with the rebels moving into the Hoth System and setting the stage for The Empire Strikes Back.

=== TIE Fighter ===
TIE Fighter (1994) picks the story up just after the Battle of Hoth. The player is initially assigned to various tasks around the galaxy, including helping protect a space station under construction on the Outer Rim, quelling a war between two non-aligned planets, and hunting down pirates. The game shifts to a growing internal threat to the Empire from two rogue Admirals. One sells his services to the Rebellion, while the other attempts to overthrow the Emperor. The game has special objectives in certain missions that increase the player's prestige with the Emperor. The game ends just before the Battle of Endor. TIE Fighter includes a number of cameo appearances, including Mon Mothma, Emperor Palpatine, then-Vice Admiral Thrawn, and Darth Vader (who in one mission fights alongside the player).

The main character of TIE Fighter is Maarek Stele, although his name is only revealed in the strategy guide and The Stele Chronicles, a short work of fiction explaining the backstory to TIE Fighter. TIE Fighter had advanced features including Gouraud shading for more realistic polygon models, and a more advanced targeting computer (showing a miniature polygon of the targeted vessel, which allows the player to see the target's relative orientation). Besides allowing the player to fly the TIE fighters, TIE Bombers, and TIE Interceptors seen in the films, the game also adds new craft with shields, weaponry, and hyperdrives. These included the Cygnus Assault Gunboat, TIE Advanced "Avenger", TIE Defender, and Cygnus Missile Gunboat (in the Defender of the Empire and Enemies of the Empire expansion packs). By the fifth campaign, the new TIE craft replace the fighters depicted in the films. As a result, the gameplay ends up similar to X-Wing, since the player's side does not feature mass overwhelming attacks with expendable craft (as the Empire would do at the height of its power), and often the player does not have the benefit of wingmen. This can be partially explained by the player being part of a special task force headed by Thrawn, tasked with destroying the rogue Grand Admiral Zaarin.

=== X-Wing vs. TIE Fighter ===
X-Wing vs. TIE Fighter (1997) is slightly different from the other games in the series. It was conceived as a multiplayer-focused version of the first two games; its single-player element is simply a set of unconnected missions, and there are no cutscenes. However, due to the reduced focus on story elements, community backlash prompted LucasArts to release the Balance of Power expansion pack, which includes two story-driven campaigns of 15 missions each complete with cutscenes. X-Wing vs. TIE Fighter was also criticized because the polygon models were reused from the then-dated TIE Fighter, with only enhanced textures.

The campaigns told roughly the same story with one featuring the Rebel point of view, and the other being from the Imperial point of view. Balance of Power also introduced much larger space stations and starships to the series, including the Super Star Destroyer at 19 kilometers in length.

Another notable feature of X-Wing vs. TIE Fighter and especially the Balance of Power expansion is the support for 8-player cooperative play.

=== X-Wing Alliance ===
X-Wing Alliance (1999) merges the improvements made in the X-Wing and TIE Fighter re-releases and provides a more complex, longer, and original storyline that takes place before and during The Empire Strikes Back and Return of the Jedi. The player is Ace Azzameen, youngest member of a family-owned transport company. The first handful of missions involve transport missions and the family's conflict with a rival company, the Viraxo. The second part involves Ace's career with the Rebel Alliance as a freelance pilot, occasionally flying "family" missions. The player shifts to the role of Lando Calrissian and pilots the Millennium Falcon in the game's final missions, which recreate the Battle of Endor.

The ability to fly multi-crew craft like the Millennium Falcon was a major new feature because the player can freely choose to be the pilot or operate one of the turrets. The AI will take over any position not controlled by the player, but can be given orders by the player. X-Wing Alliance also introduces multi-part missions that involve making hyperjumps from one region to the next. In previous games any hyperjumps the player experienced were either to start or end the mission. Additionally, players can enter a starship's hangar bay to rearm and/or receive repairs before rejoining the fight. They can witness the battle continuing to unfold outside the hangar. X-Wing Alliance added a much-desired custom mission builder feature. This allows players to quickly set up a variety of battle scenarios involving almost every vessel in the game, including dozens of fighters and combat transports that had been fought against in the single-player game and were now flyable in this mode.

=== Collector Editions ===
Collector's CD-ROM: — In 1994, after the release of Star Wars: TIE Fighter, X-Wing was re-released along with its expansion packs on CD-ROM. This edition includes various tweaks, bugfixes, easier versions of some old missions, improved graphics, redesigned cutscenes, bonus missions, and voice-overs for the mission briefings and the in-game radio messages. The in-flight engine is also upgraded to the one used in TIE Fighter, which is, in fact, an improved version of the original X-Wing engine, modified to support Gouraud shading and other rendering enhancements.

In 1995, TIE Fighter also received a Collector's CD-ROM. This version offered optional enhanced SVGA graphics, increasing the game's resolution from 320x200 to 640x480. The cinematic cutscenes were also enhanced, and the game received numerous voiceovers. The CD-ROM includes the previously released Defender of the Empire expansion and an additional Enemies of the Empire expansion. Support for Mac OS 8 and Mac OS 9 was also added.

X-Wing Collector Series: — In 1998, X-Wing and TIE Fighter were re-released again on CD-ROM, this time as part of the Collector Series, a compilation containing revamped versions of these two games retrofitted with the Star Wars: X-Wing vs. TIE Fighter engine (which uses texture mapping instead of Gouraud shading) and support for Windows 9x and 3D hardware acceleration, plus a cut-down version of Star Wars: X-Wing vs. TIE Fighter, called X-Wing vs. TIE Fighter: Flight School. This version of X-Wing vs. TIE Fighter was included to renew interest in the full-version of X-Wing vs. TIE Fighter, as it was doing poorly in stores at the time.

X-Wing Trilogy: — In late 1999, LucasArts released the X-Wing Trilogy, containing both X-Wing and TIE Fighter with the updated graphics engines, X-Wing Alliance, and a demo version of X-Wing vs. TIE Fighter. There are no differences between these versions of X-Wing and TIE Fighter and the Collector Series versions.

== Developers ==
The games were developed by Lawrence Holland's company Totally Games, under license from LucasArts, later also released by LucasArts. There are no plans to release further games in the series; although in an interview in 2003, Holland indicated he might return to the series at some point in the future. The series' original mission designers, David Wessman & David Maxwell, have also stated that they would happily return to the series.

== Reception ==
In 1996, Next Generation ranked the series as the 23rd top game of all time, calling it "second to none in the genre."
