= Lucas Learning =

American educational software company

- Type: Video game developer Educational technology
- Industry: Educational software
- Founded: February 1996 (original); 2024 (current)
- Founder: George Lucas; Susan Schilling
- Defunct: June 2001 (original)
- Headquarters: San Rafael, California, United States
- Parent: LucasArts (original); George Lucas Educational Foundation (current)
- Website: lucaslearning.com (archived; original) lucaslearning.org (current)

Lucas Learning is an initiative of the George Lucas Educational Foundation with a mission to work with partners to combine research-validated project-based learning principles with modern simulation technology for pre-K-12 schools.

== History ==
In its initial iteration, started in 1996, the Lucas Learning company was founded by George Lucas as a spin-off to LucasArts in order to provide challenging, engaging and fun educational software for classrooms. Many of their award-winning titles were based on the national curriculum. The company was located in San Rafael, California, and was headed by former MECC senior vice president of development and creative director Susan Schilling. Shilling asserted that Lucas was personally involved with the products and that a company mantra was to stay away from violence. They released games from 1998 until announcing their cancellation of a Mac version of Star Wars Super Bombad Racing in mid 2001, the year Lucas Learning decided to leave the market.

== Games ==
Title	Platform	Release date
Star Wars: DroidWorks	PC/MAC	October 21, 1998
Star Wars Episode I: The Gungan Frontier	PC/MAC	May 24, 1999
Star Wars: Yoda's Challenge Activity Center	PC/MAC	August 17, 1999
Star Wars: Pit Droids	PC/MAC	September 18, 1999
Star Wars: Anakin's Speedway	PC/MAC	March 20, 2000
Star Wars: Early Learning Activity Center	PC/MAC	August 15, 2000
Star Wars Math: Jabba's Game Galaxy	PC/MAC	September 1, 2000
Star Wars: Jar Jar's Journey	PC/MAC	November 15, 2000
Star Wars: Super Bombad Racing (published by LucasArts)	PS2	April 23, 2001

== Critical reception ==
The Boston Herald wrote that the company was "setting a new standard in software development with a unique cooperative effort between Lucas' film and software sides".
