= Jango Fett =

Fictional character in the Star Wars universe

- Star Wars character
- Temuera Morrison as Jango Fett in Star Wars: Episode II – Attack of the Clones (2002)
- First appearance: Attack of the Clones (2002)
- Created by: George Lucas
- Portrayed by: Temuera Morrison
- Voiced by: Jeff Bennett (Star Wars: Galactic Battlegrounds and Star Wars: Jedi Starfighter); Temuera Morrison (Star Wars: Bounty Hunter, Star Wars: Battlefront II (2005 video game), Star Wars Battlefront: Elite Squadron, Star Wars: The Force Unleashed, and Lego Star Wars: The Video Game); Trevor Devall (Lego Star Wars: Droid Tales); Andrew Chaikin (Star Wars Battlefront: Renegade Squadron); Dee Bradley Baker (Lego Star Wars: The Skywalker Saga)

In-universe information
- Species: Human
- Gender: Male
- Occupation: Bounty hunter Mandalore of the True Mandalorians (formerly; Legends)
- Affiliation: Confederacy of Independent Systems; Mandalorians
- Family: Jaster Mereel (adoptive father); Clone troopers (clones)
- Children: Boba Fett (clone son); Omega (clone daughter)
- Home: Concord Dawn

Jango Fett is a fictional character in the Star Wars franchise, created by George Lucas. He first appeared as the secondary antagonist of the 2002 film Star Wars: Episode II – Attack of the Clones, played by Temuera Morrison. The character is a Mandalorian bounty hunter, regarded as the best mercenary in the galaxy of his era, and the father of Boba Fett, an unmodified clone of Jango whom he kept as payment for serving as the genetic template of the Galactic Republic's clone army and raised as his son. Following Jango's death at the hands of Mace Windu, Boba follows in his father's footsteps, using his armor, equipment, and ship, Slave I, to become a successful bounty hunter in his own right.

Outside of the films, the character appears in a number of canonical and non-canonical Star Wars works, such as comic books and video games, many of which depict him as an antihero rather than a villainous figure, and explore his past as both a bounty hunter and a Mandalorian warrior. Since the release of Attack of the Clones, Jango Fett has become a popular figure within the Star Wars fanbase, gaining a cult following.

== Characteristics ==
=== Concept and creation ===
In early drafts of Attack of the Clones, Fett's first name was "J'mee". His name is a reference to Sergio Corbucci's 1966 Spaghetti Western film Django, featuring a hyper-violent drifter of the same name played by Franco Nero. Django was very well known due to the uses and abuses that the Spaghetti Western industry made of his name and character during the 1970s and 1980s.

Jango is covered in a sleek armored suit that conceals his scarred face, largely based on Boba Fett's iconic outfit (designed by Joe Johnston) from the original trilogy. (Note: The Mandalorian season 2 episode "Chapter 14: The Tragedy" establishes that Jango's suit is canonically the same suit later worn by Boba.) His suit was initially planned to be white to match the concept art for Boba Fett, but this was changed to silver and blue, in contrast to Boba's green, red, and orange. Jango also uniquely has thigh, shin, and spat armor, as well as a comparative lack of accessories and trophies.

Franchise creator George Lucas decided that Jango would wear Mandalorian armor but would not be from their planet.

=== Portrayal ===
Jango Fett was portrayed by Temuera Morrison in Attack of the Clones, who subsequently voiced the character in most of his video game appearances, including Star Wars: Bounty Hunter, Star Wars: Battlefront II, Star Wars Battlefront: Elite Squadron, and the PSP version of Star Wars: The Force Unleashed. According to Morrison, he "couldn't see anything" while wearing the costume's helmet due to fog from his breath, making it difficult to perform.

Additionally, Jango was portrayed by Bob Marshall in a commercial for Star Wars: Bounty Hunter (but the voice was provided by a different, unknown actor), and voiced by Jeff Bennett in the games Star Wars: Galactic Battlegrounds and Star Wars: Jedi Starfighter, and Andrew Chaikin in Star Wars Battlefront: Renegade Squadron.

== Appearances ==
=== Film ===
==== Attack of the Clones ====
In Star Wars: Episode II – Attack of the Clones, Jango is depicted as a bounty hunter who had been hired to be the genetic template for the Grand Army of the Republic, becoming entangled in a shady plot by Sith Lord Darth Tyranus (publicly known as Count Dooku). He is later hired by Viceroy Nute Gunray of the Trade Federation to assassinate Senator Padmé Amidala in retaliation for her actions in The Phantom Menace. Fett subcontracts the job to shape-shifter Zam Wesell. Two failed assassination attempts on the Senator's life force Fett to kill Wesell with a poison dart, to prevent her from potentially leading the Jedi to the ocean planet Kamino.

Despite Jango's efforts, Obi-Wan Kenobi's own investigation of the poison dart ultimately brings him to Kamino, where he soon learns that a cloning facility on the planet is using Jango's genetic template to produce a massive clone army, seemingly commissioned on behalf of the Galactic Republic. The ensuing confrontation between Obi-Wan and Jango forces the latter to flee to Geonosis, rendezvousing with his benefactor Tyranus. (Note: Fett was digitally removed from a scene of Tyranus meeting with the Separatists to keep his dealings with the Sith lord obscure until later in the film.) Jango takes part in the Battle of Geonosis, where he encounters a rhinoceros-like beast known as a reek, which tramples and damages his jetpack. Unable to fly away, he is then decapitated by Jedi Master Mace Windu.

Jango's legacy is taken up in the form of the Republic's clone army based on his genetic material, as well as his son Boba, who inherits the armor once worn by Jango and goes on to become the most notorious bounty hunter in the galaxy.

=== Television ===
==== The Clone Wars ====
Jango is mentioned posthumously several times in the animated television series Star Wars: The Clone Wars.

In the episode "The Mandalore Plot", Obi-Wan Kenobi mentions his encounter with Jango to Prime Minister Almec of Mandalore, who dismisses Fett's ties to the Mandalorian culture. In the episode "Clone Cadets", Prime Minister Lama Su of Kamino laments that Fett's death has resulted in the Kaminoan cloners' supply of his DNA being stretched thin. A hologram of Fett appears in the following episode, "ARC Troopers".

In a three-episode story arc comprising "Death Trap", "R2 Come Home", and "Lethal Trackdown", Boba Fett works with fellow bounty hunters to exact revenge against Mace Windu for the latter killing his father. The boy sacrifices Jango's helmet to bait Windu toward an explosive device hidden inside it, though Windu senses the trap and survives. After Boba is apprehended by the Republic, he vows to never forgive the Jedi for his father's death.

==== The Mandalorian ====
Jango is mentioned several times in the second-season episode "Chapter 14: The Tragedy" of The Mandalorian streaming television series. Boba reveals that his armor (which he reclaims from the title character) is the very suit once worn by his father and thus his birthright. Between Boba's dialog and the holographic "chain code" he shows the protagonist, it is established that Jango was adopted into the Mandalorian culture by his mentor, Jaster; that he hailed from Concord Dawn; and that he fought in the Mandalorian Civil Wars—elements all broadly reflective of the character's backstory in the Legends comic Jango Fett: Open Seasons.

==== The Bad Batch ====
Jango is mentioned again in Star Wars: The Bad Batch, an animated spin-off from the Clone Wars series. The episodes "Aftermath" and "Bounty Lost" revealed that Omega, a girl who joined Clone Force 99 after the rise of the Galactic Empire, is an enhanced female clone and second unaltered replication of Fett's template, therefore making her his daughter.

==== The Book of Boba Fett ====
Jango is mentioned several times in The Book of Boba Fett, a spin-off of The Mandalorian. In the episode "Chapter 7: In the Name of Honor", Cad Bane taunts Boba about being a killer like his father causing Boba to retaliate and kill Bane.

=== Canonical literature ===
Jango is the protagonist of the Marvel Comics one-shot Star Wars: Age of Republic – Jango Fett (2019).

=== Legends ===
In April 2014, most of the licensed Star Wars novels, comics, video games, and other works produced since the original 1977 film were rebranded by Lucasfilm as Star Wars Legends and declared non-canonical to the franchise going forward.

==== Video games ====
Star Wars: Bounty Hunter features Jango Fett as the playable character. The game depicts Jango during his prime as a bounty hunter, providing the backstory to his role in Attack of the Clones, and follows him as he becomes entangled in an extensive "death stick" trafficking conspiracy. The game ends with Jango defeating fallen Jedi Komari Vosa, the leader of the Bando Gora crime syndicate, and outgunning his longtime rival Montross, a fellow Mandalorian, before the entire ordeal is revealed to be a trial organized by Count Dooku to find a suitable candidate to be the genetic template of the clone army.

Jango Fett makes further playable and non-playable appearances in Star Wars: Jedi Starfighter, Lego Star Wars, Star Wars: Battlefront, Lego Star Wars II, Lego Star Wars: The Complete Saga, Lego Star Wars: The Force Awakens, Star Wars: Battlefront II, Star Wars Battlefront: Renegade Squadron, and Lego Star Wars: The Skywalker Saga. The character even leaves the Star Wars brand by having a guest appearance in Tony Hawk's Pro Skater 4 as an unlockable character. He also appears as a boss fight in the video game adaptation of Star Wars Episode II: Attack of the Clones and the PlayStation Portable version of Star Wars: The Force Unleashed.

Jango is indirectly mentioned in Star Wars Knights of the Old Republic II: The Sith Lords. After the player defeats Kreia, who has retaken her identity as the Sith Lord Darth Traya during the game's climax, she offers the player a vision of the future as a final gift, with one of her prophecies being Fett's death at the hands of Mace Windu over three millennia later.

An evil pig version of Jango Fett (called "Jango Fatt") is a playable character in Angry Birds Star Wars II. His son "Boba Fatt" and clone troopers are also playable.

==== Literature ====
Fett appears in the Dark Horse comic books Jango Fett, Jango Fett: Open Seasons, and the Toys "R" Us promotional comic Full of Surprises.

He also appears in the Star Wars: Adventures books Jango Fett vs. The Razor Eaters, The Shape Shifter Strikes, and Warlords of Balmorra.

The character was also in the Jedi Readers book Jango Fett: Bounty Hunter, in Boba Fett: The Fight to Survive, and the novelization of Episode II – Attack of the Clones.

===== Jango Fett: Open Seasons =====
Jango Fett: Open Seasons is a comic written by Haden Blackman with art by Ramón F. Bachs and published on 29 January 2003. The story begins shortly after the events of Episode I – The Phantom Menace, with long flashbacks to earlier periods.

26 years before the events of The Phantom Menace, the Mandalorians split into two factions: the barbaric Death Watch, led by Tor Vizsla, and the True Mandalorians, honorable mercenaries led by Jaster Mereel. The two factions battle on Jango's homeworld of Concord Dawn. Jango's family helps Jaster, inciting Vizsla and his men to kill them. A young Jango is the only survivor and, while horrified, helps Jaster and his men escape and ambush Death Watch. Jaster subsequently adopts Jango and welcomes him into his faction.

Years later, Jango has become a full-fledged Mandalorian warrior under Jaster's tutelage. The Mandalorians are ambushed by Death Watch, and Jaster is killed by Vizsla. Sporting Jaster's armor, Jango becomes the new leader of the True Mandalorians. A Jedi strike force led by then-Jedi Master Count Dooku slays Jango's warriors. Jango retaliates and kills several Jedi without any weapons before ultimately being defeated and sold into slavery to the planet's governor. Jango later escapes, attacks Death Watch and kills Vizsla, before beginning pursuing a career as a bounty hunter.

Dooku, now a Sith Lord, on the orders of his master, Darth Sidious, pits the most notorious mercenaries of the galaxy against each other in order to select a genetic template for an army of clones. Remembering Jango from their previous encounter and impressed by Jango's unarmed killing of several Jedi, Dooku seeks out Fett. Fett emerges victorious and in a tense meeting with Dooku, requests one thing in return for donating his DNA: an unmodified clone to be his son and apprentice.

== In popular culture ==
Pop culture website IGN named Jango Fett as the 30th greatest Star Wars character in their Top 100 countdown, citing his calm, effective demeanor and prowess in combat, despite not possessing a connection with the Force.

On February 4, 2022, Indy Stevenson posted a fan comic of The Book of Boba Fett entitled "This Place Was Home" on Twitter to a positive critical reception. The comic explores Jango's relationship with Zam Wesell, simultaneous with the events of Attack of the Clones.

On May 4th, 2022, Entertainment Weekly ranked Jango Fett 65th on its list of the greatest on-screen Star Wars characters, describing him as a "cold-blooded yet honorable mercenary" and highlighting his role as the genetic template for the clone army.

== See also ==
- Space Western
