= Outlaws (1997 video game) =

1997 video game

- Developer: LucasArts (Note: Remaster version developed by Nightdive Studios)
- Publisher: LucasArts (Note: Remaster version published by Atari)
- Producer: Lleslle Aclaro
- Designers: Stephen R. Shaw; Daron Stinnett; Charlie Ramos; Adam Schnitzer
- Programmers: Stephen Michael Ash; Richard Fife; Aaron Giles; Stephen R. Shaw; Daron Stinnett
- Artists: Maria Bowen; Kevin Evans; Adam Schnitzer; Patrick Sirk
- Writers: Matthew Jacobs; Stephen R. Shaw
- Composer: Clint Bajakian
- Engine: Jedi
- Platforms: Windows: Remaster; Nintendo Switch; PlayStation 4; PlayStation 5; Windows; Xbox One; Xbox Series X/S
- Release: April 7, 1997; Remaster: WW: November 20, 2025
- Genre: First-person shooter
- Modes: Single-player, multiplayer

Outlaws is a first-person shooter video game developed and published by LucasArts for Windows, released in April 7, 1997. Set in the Wild West, it follows retired U.S. Marshal James Anderson, who seeks to bring justice to a gang of criminals who killed his wife and kidnapped his daughter. It uses an enhanced version of the Jedi game engine, first used in Star Wars: Dark Forces. It is also largely credited as the first shooter game with a sniper zoom, as well as one of the first to feature a gun reloading mechanic. LucasArts' INSANE animation engine was used to render computer graphics animation sequences. These have special filters to look hand-drawn, and play between each mission and set up the action in the next area.

The game received generally favorable reviews from critics. While the graphics were compared unfavorably to its contemporaries such as Quake, reviewers near-unanimously praised its gameplay and Clint Bajakian's orchestral soundtrack. The voice cast includes veteran talent such as Jeff Osterhage, Richard Moll and John de Lancie. A free expansion, entitled Handful of Missions, was released in 1998. Community-created expansion levels are also available and have received media coverage. Although not a huge financial success, the game has received a cult following comparable to other LucasArts titles.

A high-definition remaster developed by Nightdive Studios, titled Outlaws + Handful of Missions: Remaster, was released by Atari Inc. on November 20, 2025.

== Gameplay ==
Outlaws features one of the earliest examples of a sniper zoom system. Unlike many modern shooters, which switch to a full screen zoom, here only the scope itself is affected by the zoom.

Outlaws is a first-person shooter. Players control the character as he utilizes several American Old West weapons and items, such as a rifle, shotgun, dynamite and revolver. The player can activate the lantern inventory item to lighten dark areas, and use a shovel in specific areas to dig holes. In the lower difficulty levels, termed Good and Bad, the player is able to sustain several bullet wounds with no apparent ill effects. In the hardest difficulty level, Ugly, the player's resistance is reduced to one or two shots. This forces the player into a different style of play. Where on the easier difficulty levels a player might charge into a gunfight heedless of Anderson's personal health, in Ugly mode, the player must use stealth and cover to win.

It is the first video game to feature a sniper zoom, and one of the earliest examples of a reloading mechanic.

Some weapons have alternate fire modes. The basic revolver is a single-shot weapon; holding the alternate fire button allows the player to fire rapidly, akin to fanning. The rifle has no alternate mode until the player acquires a telescopic sight, whereupon alternate fire allows the player to use it as a sniper rifle. Knives can stab, or be thrown. In contrast, the Gatling gun, when deployed, can traverse from side to side, but the player is otherwise unable to move until they stow the weapon away.

Scenarios include a Wild West town, a moving train, a sawmill, a mine, a cliff-side, a Civil War battlefield and a wharf area.

Aside from the main single player campaign, Outlaws includes a set of five discrete missions that chronicle Anderson's rise to the rank of U.S. Marshal. Each of the missions requires Anderson to either capture or kill a specific outlaw. Ranks (Deputy, Sheriff, and Marshal) are awarded on the accumulation of a set number of points. Points are awarded for recovering stolen gold, capturing/killing the outlaw, and for killing enemies. Each outlaw that the player captures or kills appears in a jail cell in Anderson's field office. More points are awarded for capturing an outlaw than for killing one, due to the difficulty in capturing one alive. Completion of the Historical Missions is not a requirement for playing the single player campaign.

Outlaws also features a multiplayer deathmatch in four variants, including a Kill the Fool with the Chicken mode. Multiplayer can be played over local area network, and it was one of the featured games on the MSN Gaming Zone before its demise. The player can assume the role of one of six characters from the main game: James Anderson, Matt "Dr. Death" Jackson, "Bloody" Mary Nash, Chief Two-Feathers, "Gentleman" Bob Graham, and "Spittin'" Jack Sanchez. Each character has its own advantages and disadvantages in terms of speed/maneuverability, weapons selection, and resistance.

The game was shipped on Mixed Mode CD, which allowed the music score, composed by Clint Bajakian, to also be played in an audio CD player. An orchestra was used with authentic instruments which was uncommon at that time. It is noteworthy that, for the game's original release, the rear cover of the jewel-case listed the fifteen tracks of the soundtrack like any normal audio CD.

== Plot ==
James Anderson, a retired U.S. Marshal, comes home after a trip to the general store to find his wife Anna dying and that his daughter Sarah has been kidnapped by two outlaws known as Matt "Dr. Death" Jackson and "Slim" Sam Fulton, under the employ of the railroad baron Bob Graham. Graham has hired several wanted outlaws to "enlighten" the people of the county to sell their land to him, so that he can make a profit off of a huge railroad. However, the psychotic Dr. Death misinterprets Graham's meaning of enlightenment, attacks Anna and leaves her for dead, kidnaps Anderson's daughter, and burns his home to the ground. After burying his wife, the retired Marshal picks up his gun once again and rides off to find his daughter. He travels around the old West, shooting his way through each member of Graham's hired outlaws.

On his journey Anderson is haunted by dreams of his father's murder as a child. He recalls that while the two were camping out in the wild, an unknown assailant shot his father in his sleep for no specific reason, but left young James alive, telling him to "keep that fear [of death], kid". After questioning more and more outlaws, Anderson is confronted by Dr. Death in an old mine. Anderson eventually gets the drop on him; he gets tangled up in a rope above a deep mine shaft. Dr. Death tells him that his daughter is hidden in an old Indian cliff village. After finding out that Anderson is not going to let him out of the pit, he teases Anderson about the murder of his wife. Anderson is enraged and puts his cigar in the pulley from which the rope is hanging, eventually burning up the rope and sending Dr. Death plummeting to his demise at the bottom of the shaft.

At the Indian village, Anderson is ambushed by renegade Indian Two Feathers. After defeating him, Two Feathers praises Anderson's strength in battle, and out of sympathy because he once had a child he had lost, tells Sarah's real location: Bob Graham's estate, Big Rock ranch. Anderson blasts his way into Graham's villa, and finally confronts him. After a fierce gunfight, Graham is believed dead and falls to the ground, and Anderson reunites with his daughter. Graham gets up and trains his gun on Anderson, causing him to recognize Graham as the man who killed his father. Just as Graham is about to finish off Anderson, Sarah manages to shoot Graham with Anderson's gun, avenging her grandfather's death. After a tearful reunion, father and daughter ride into the sunset.

== Development ==
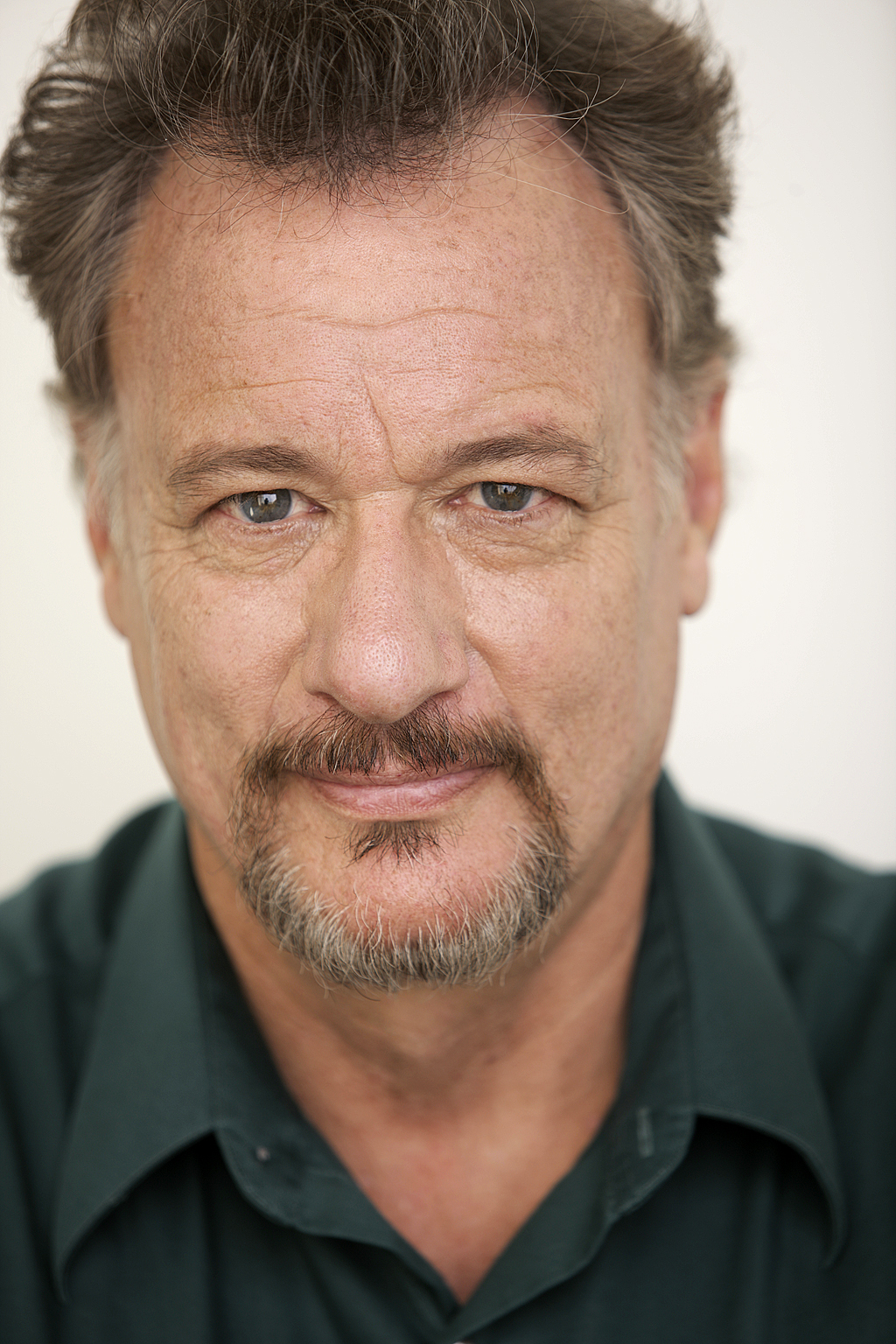
John de Lancie portrays Matt "Dr. Death" Jackson.

Outlaws is powered by an upgraded version of the Jedi engine, which was previously used on Star Wars: Dark Forces. LucasArts' INSANE animation engine is used to display the game's cutscenes. The game was also originally planned to have 12 unique multiplayer characters, each with their own in-game attributes. The final release halved that number to six characters. The game was inspired by western films such as The Good, the Bad and the Ugly and A Fistful of Dollars, as well as other Clint Eastwood westerns. Despite the serious tone of the game, Outlaws maintained a few easter egg jokes, including Max of the Sam & Max series, hidden inside a building, a pair of grey aliens experimenting on a cow, and several references to the Indiana Jones series of games and movies.

Outlaws is listed as one of noted game designer John Romero's all-time favorite games.

Several veteran actors lend their voices to the game. Richard Moll of Night Court plays the game's main antagonist, Bob Graham. John de Lancie portrays Matt Jackson, the secondary antagonist. Veteran voice actor Jack Angel portrays two characters, George Bowers and Jack Sanchez. Jeff Osterhage, himself a veteran of western television films, voices the game's protagonist, U.S. Marshal James Anderson.

== Release ==
LucasArts released the game on 7 April 1997. Later that year, LucasArts released a patch to update the game to version 1.1, adding support for Glide and Aureal A3D

In 1998, LucasArts released a set of four single player missions, called Handful of Missions, for download from the official website. The package includes several new multiplayer missions, and a patch to update the game to version 2.0. The single player missions take place outside of the original game's story, and each level is unrelated to the next.

In 2001, LucasArts released another patch, adding Direct3D compatibility, complementing the existing software rendering support.

On March 19, 2015, Disney Interactive re-released the game for digital distribution on GOG.com.

Third-party levels have been created by the game's community. On April 5, 2013, GameSpot and several other media outlets organized a playthrough of several LucasArts games to honor the then-recently closed developer. GameSpot staff noted that the "community for [Outlaws] has created like 75 user generated maps". In reality more than 1,500 custom multiplayer maps have been created since Outlaws was released, and maps continued to be released until late 2012.

== Reception ==
Outlaws

Aggregate score
Aggregator	Score
GameRankings	79.80%

Review scores
Publication	Score
Computer Gaming World	3/5
Edge	4/10
GameRevolution	A−
GameSpot	8.6/10
Next Generation	3/5
Computer Games Magazine	4/5
PC Zone (UK)	83/100

Outlaws received generally positive reviews from critics. It has been featured in multiple Best Of lists since its release. Complex.com writer Gus Turner included it in his list of The 25 Best LucasArts Games. Of its legacy Turner said it was not a "major financial success, the title has only been able to attract a cult following since its release." Brittany Vincent of ShackNews placed it on her list of Five LucasArts Classics Ripe for Remakes, and noted that it "deserves another chance to woo gamers."

Next Generation stated that "Outlaws uses the Dark Forces engine, and it shows. The graphics are a bit outdated, a bit disorienting, and more than a bit pixelated in close. The game's saving grace is its plot, admittedly and oft-overlooked aspect of this genre."

GameSpot reviewer Chris Hudak commended the game's story and cinematic cutscenes, calling it a "movie-worthy experience" and citing the cinematic and musical influences of Sergio Leone's spaghetti westerns and Ennio Morricone's scores, respectively; he overall praised the game and called it "the most complete and faithful Old West shooter in the industry to date". In a retrospective review of the game, Kotaku editor Luke Plunkett praised the game's soundtrack and called the multiplayer "excellent." Plunkett cited the release of the visually superior Quake a year earlier and Half-Life not long after as factors that led to the game fading into obscurity for most players. The Escapist's Stew Shearer gave high marks for the game's villains; he called them "fun to hate." He stated that Outlaws "isn't just Doom with cowboys; you can tell that the developers put some real hard work into making the player feel like they're the hero in a Sergio Leone flick." The reviewer for Computer Games Magazine noted that while the game did not look as visually appealing as its competitors, other developers should "show as much thought in level and multiplayer design."

Some reviewers were more critical of the game. The reviewer for Computer Gaming World said that "There's nothing really wrong with Outlaws. There just isn't much right with it." The reviewer noted that the game had excellent music and art, but felt that the game had nothing new or innovative to offer players. Edge magazine's reviewer stated that "not for the first time, shown that it's not infallible." Charlie Brooker of PC Zone had to take time to warm up to the game, as he stated "when you start playing Outlaws, it feels downright cruddy." Brooker ultimately said that after a lengthy amount of play his opinion changed, and overall he gave the game a favorable review.

Outlaws won the "Best Story" award in PC Games' annual awards ceremony, concluding with "LucasArts did Sergio Leone proud with this story, presented in beautifully cinematic cutscenes." Computer Gaming World gave the soundtrack for Outlaws its 1997 "Musical Achievement" award. During the Academy of Interactive Arts & Sciences' 1st Annual Interactive Achievement Awards, Outlaws was a finalist for "Outstanding Achievement in Sound and Music", which ultimately went to PaRappa the Rapper. In 2008 IGN selected the soundtrack from Outlaws to its "10 Great Videogame Albums" list.
