= Star Wars: The Battle for Hoth =

2010 real-time strategy video game

- Developer: FluffyLogic
- Publisher: THQ Wireless
- Series: Star Wars
- Platforms: iOS, Windows Mobile
- Release: iOS; July 15, 2010; Windows Mobile; October 21, 2010
- Genre: Real-time strategy
- Mode: Single-player

Star Wars: The Battle for Hoth is a real-time strategy video game based on the Star Wars franchise, developed by FluffyLogic and published by THQ Wireless for iOS and Windows Mobile in 2010.

== Reception ==
Reception

Aggregate score
Aggregator	Score
Metacritic	64/100

Review scores
Publication	Score
Gamezebo	(iOS) 80/100
IGN	(iOS) 7.4/10 (WinM) 6.5/10
Pocket Gamer	(iOS) 3/5 (WinM) 2.5/5
VideoGamer.com	(iOS) 7/10

The iOS version received "mixed" reviews according to the review aggregation website Metacritic.
