= Star Wars: Pit Droids =

1999 video game

- Developer: Lucas Learning
- Publisher: Lucas Learning
- Series: Star Wars
- Platforms: Windows, Mac OS, iOS
- Release: Windows, Mac OS; September 13, 1999 iOS; February 9, 2012
- Genres: Puzzle, educational
- Mode: Single-player

Star Wars: Pit Droids (full title: Star Wars Pit Droids: Logic and Reasoning) is an educational puzzle game developed and published by Lucas Learning. It was originally released for Microsoft Windows and Mac OS on September 13, 1999. It was later ported to iOS and released on February 9, 2012. The game develops skills such as hypothesis testing and geometry.

== Plot ==
Watto has bought a series of new pit droids, and tasks the player with transporting them to the Pod Racing arena by avoiding all the environmental obstacles.

== Gameplay ==
The player maneuvers the pit droids through a series of puzzles such as road blocks and junk heaps. Players can also create their own puzzles and trade them online with other gamers.

== Critical reception ==
Matt Diamond of Inside Mac Games praised the puzzle, variable difficulty, graphics, and music. Brad Cook of All Game Guide complimented its detailed graphics, intricate gameplay, and jazzy soundtrack. Just Adventure's Ray Ivey liked the aesthetic quality of the game manual. The Scotsman said the game was very playable for a TV-tie in and offered educational opportunities. IGN gave the game a rating of 7.5. The Boston Herald thought the game offered an interesting test of children's logical abilities. The Boston Globe thought it was a standout in the children's software genre, mentioning its animation, sound effects, and tutorial. CVG said the game was easy to play, but added that its overly simple concept reduced its replayability.

Pit Droids won Computer Games Strategy Plus's 1999 "Classic Game of the Year" award. The editors wrote: "[T]his game is not only mind-bogglingly fun for puzzle fans of all ages, it is also solid, well-designed, addictive, attractive, and arguably the year's best use of the Star Wars Episode I license". Pit Droids won a CODiE Award from the Software and Information Industry Association for "Arcade/Action/Adventure/Role-Playing Games - Best Product" as a joint winner with Half-Life. Pit Droids was also nominated for "Games - Best Product", but lost to Half-Life.
