= Star Wars Math: Jabba's Game Galaxy =

2000 educational video game

- Developer: Lucas Learning
- Publisher: Lucas Learning
- Series: Star Wars
- Release: September 1, 2000
- Genre: Educational
- Mode: Single-player

Star Wars Math: Jabba's Game Galaxy is an educational Star Wars game released by Lucas Learning in 2000 for Windows and Macintosh. The game uses characters from The Phantom Menace to teach kids basic math skills.

== Development ==
"Our main goal with Star Wars Math was to create an engaging game for kids, that still has all the components parents are looking for: recognizable math content, high replayability, and an overarching goal with lots of rewards and encouragement. We wanted to go beyond the standard math drill and practice software game and excite kids about math in a new and fun way that was well integrated with the Star Wars universe".

— Collette Michaud, project leader for Lucas Learning, The Force

After working on various games as LucasArts - the last of which was Mortimer and the Riddles of the Medallion, Collette Michaud helped to found the children's edutainment-themed sister company Lucas Learning and served as project leader and designer of Droidworks and Star Wars Math Jabba’s Game Galaxy. Early on, a few Lucas Learning employees met with George Lucas at Skywalker Ranch to discuss his goals or creating learning software for children, which led to Lucas offering some early notes for DroidWorks. Lucas soon became preoccupied with the Star Wars prequel trilogy, and he didn't offer much interaction after that, including for Star Wars Math.

Star Wars Math was one of the six titles who went into direct-to-school distribution by Lucas Learning.

Buying via the LucasArts Company Store, customers could get a limited-edition magnetic jigsaw puzzle.

== Plot and gameplay ==
The aim of the game is to build spaceships and travel around the galaxy. This is achieved by playing minigames to earn credits, which can then be exchanged with Watto for spaceship parts.

Players play minigames based on popular games such as Dueling Dice (a simplified version of blackjack) and Holochex, called Dejarik in the Star Wars universe (based on checkers), which was first seen in Star Wars: A New Hope.

Each of the minigames "supports the content standards for primary grades developed by the National Council of Teachers of Mathematics (NCTM)".

== Critical reception ==
Macworld praised the animation, though felt the educational content was lacking. Newsday and The Washington Times liked the "extraordinary" animation and the Hollywood soundtrack, ultimately deeming it a fun experience for fans of the franchise. The Washington Times liked that the game's construction "slyly" taught players basic arithmetic and logic in a "totally fun" way that made the reviewer smile. Daily Campus disliked the character of Watto, though felt he was redeemed in games such as Star Wars Math. Chron felt the minigames were "agreeably atmospheric and offbeat", though felt they were more work than play. Vandal asserted that in the oeuvre of Star Wars titles, this is one of the few educational games and requires players to do continuous mathematical calculations. Allgame felt the game contained both good and bad elements of design.

The Parenting Center honored it as a Seal of Approval Winner Holiday 2000.

=== Awards and accolades ===
- Holiday 2000: The National Parenting Center, Seal of Approval
- November 2000: NewMedia INVISION Award, Gold: Hard Media - Education Kids 7-12
- October 2000: Oppenheim Toy Portfolio Platinum - Best Toy Award
- October 2000: Dr. Toy's 100 Best Children's Products for 2000
- October 2000: Dr. Toy's 10 Best Software/CD-ROM/High Tech Products for 2000
- September 2000: Children's Software Revue, All Star Software 2000 Award
