= Star Wars: Episode II – Attack of the Clones (video game) =

2002 video game

- North American box art
- Developer: David A. Palmer Productions
- Publisher: THQ
- Producers: James Palmer; Nathan K. Rose
- Programmers: Andrew Bowen; Matthew Hopwood
- Artists: Ian Terry; Stoo Cambridge; Tim Claycomb; Paul Simon; James Clarke
- Composers: Allister Brimble; Will Davis; Michael Delaney
- Series: Star Wars
- Platform: Game Boy Advance
- Release: NA: May 30, 2002; EU: June 21, 2002
- Genre: Action
- Mode: Single-player

Star Wars: Episode II – Attack of the Clones is an action game based on the 2002 film of the same name, developed by David A. Palmer Productions and published by THQ for the Game Boy Advance. The game was first announced by THQ and LucasArts in February 2002, months prior to the film's release.

== Gameplay ==
Gameplay of the first level with Anakin Skywalker walking across buildings in Coruscant to get to a speeder

Throughout 11 levels, the player can play as three of the film's main protagonists: Obi-Wan Kenobi, Mace Windu, and Anakin Skywalker. They are also able to fight various enemies, as well as bosses such as Count Dooku and Jango Fett. The game's plot covers important events from Attack of the Clones such as Anakin battling the Sand People, Obi-Wan tracking Jango and his son Boba, and the Jedi Order's climactic battle with Dooku and the Separatists.

The levels play across planets from the film, including Tatooine, Coruscant, and Geonosis, and can differ in terms of gameplay. Most levels are played in a 2D side-scrolling beat 'em up manner on foot, in which the player's lightsaber can be used for slashing and deflection attacks. Some levels play out as 3D first-person vehicular chase sequences, such as the speeder chase through Coruscant in pursuit of bounty hunter Zam Wesell early in the film.

== Reception ==
Reception

Aggregate scores
Aggregator	Score
GameRankings	38.87%
Metacritic	38/100

Review scores
Publication	Score
AllGame	1/5
Computer and Video Games	3/10
Electronic Gaming Monthly	2.17/10
Game Informer	1/10
GamePro	1.5/5
GameSpot	3.7/10
GameSpy	2/5
GameZone	6/10
IGN	6.5/10
Nintendo Power	2.7/5

The game was met with generally negative reception. Reasons include its control issues, simple difficulty, poor level designs and dated password system. Game Informer gave it an abysmal 1/10, calling it "the dark side of gaming." The game so far has a score of 38.89% from GameRankings and 38 out of 100 from Metacritic. However, a few reviewers, including IGN, thought the game was fine and gave a more forgiving review of it.
