= Star Wars Battlefront: Elite Squadron =

2009 action shooter video game

- North American PSP box art
- Developers: Rebellion Developments (PSP); N-Space (DS)
- Publisher: LucasArts
- Producers: Jaime Valls Enriquez (PSP); Scott Kiraly (DS)
- Designers: Andrew Haith (PSP); Brendan McLeod (DS)
- Programmers: Richard May (PSP); Rick Marino (DS)
- Artist: Daniel Meeuws (PSP)
- Writer: Paul Mackman (PSP)
- Composers: Tony Porter (DS); Karl Demer (DS)
- Series: Star Wars: Battlefront
- Platforms: PlayStation Portable, Nintendo DS
- Release: NA: November 3, 2009; EU: November 6, 2009
- Genre: Third-person shooter
- Modes: Single-player, multiplayer

Star Wars Battlefront: Elite Squadron is a third-person shooter video game based on the Star Wars franchise. It is the fourth installment in the Star Wars: Battlefront series, and the second handheld exclusive, after Star Wars Battlefront: Renegade Squadron. It was released on November 3, 2009, in North America and November 6 in Europe, for the Nintendo DS and PlayStation Portable.

The game's single-player campaign follows an elite clone trooper named "X2" created from the DNA of a Jedi Master, who, upon the formation of the Galactic Empire, joins the Rebel Alliance and takes part in all major battles throughout the Galactic Civil War, later going on to serve the New Republic and train as a Jedi, while also facing his fellow-clone "brother" X1, who had become a Sith. The campaign is part of the now non-canonical Star Wars Legends continuity and features appearances from several characters from the films and other Star Wars media, such as Luke Skywalker and Rahm Kota (a main character in Star Wars: The Force Unleashed).

== Gameplay ==
Elite Squadron features "Heroes and Villains" gameplay.

Elite Squadron allows players to participate in combat on foot, in ground vehicles or in space. Players are also able to enter capital ships and, once the shields are down, fight the enemy inside on foot. The ground-space transitions are accompanied by short cutscenes while the game loads the next area. The same is also true of entering or exiting a capital ship. This is the first Battlefront game to allow players to fly from ground to space battles. The consequences of each battle will depend on the players actions, meaning that each individual enemy killed can affect the outcome of a result. The battlefront will not be one giant, seamless map, but a compilation of inter-connected, smaller size areas, each one capable of affecting the other.

It includes playable characters such as Luke Skywalker, Boba Fett, Darth Vader, Darth Maul, The Emperor and Kit Fisto, and the Heroes and Villains mode (Assault Mode) last featured in Star Wars: Battlefront II. Also included is General Rahm Kota, a character from Star Wars: The Force Unleashed, as well as other characters from Renegade Squadron, such as Col Serra. Also, the Galactic Conquest mode features a new mechanic not seen in previous versions, where two players are able to share a single PSP, and compete against each other in a strategy based game mode. Players are also able to mix characters from the Star Wars saga and put them into locations and situations that never happened within canon. The story mode has been called "a huge step up from previous story modes", and was praised for incorporating the controls into the mission. As players made progress in the story and completed objectives, they would unlock customization props.

== Plot ==
The game's campaign takes place in the Star Wars Legends canon, beginning around the time of Revenge of the Sith and covering events up to Return of the Jedi, as well as some that go beyond the films. Throughout the campaign, the player assumes the role of X2, an elite clone trooper created from the DNA of a Jedi Master. Along with his brother X1, he is assigned to serve under Jedi General Ferroda, and oversee the training of the clone army used by the Galactic Republic in the Clone Wars. Under Ferroda's command, X2 and X1 are assigned various missions throughout the war, including defending a training camp on Tatooine, and fighting in the Battles of Coruscant and Cato Neimodia. During the latter, Order 66 is issued, branding all Jedi as traitors to the Republic, including Ferroda. X2 reluctantly executes him, an action he soon comes to regret. Following the transformation of the Republic into the Galactic Empire, X1 joins the Empire, while X2 goes rogue, haunted by the memory of killing Ferroda.

X2 travels to Dantooine to meet his genetic template, Jedi Master Falon Grey, who trains X2 in the Jedi arts, teaching him how to use his Force abilities. Not long into X2's training, their location is discovered by the Empire, and X1 leads an assault. X2 manages to escape, but is badly injured, while Grey is killed during the fight. Years later, blind Jedi Master Rahm Kota finds X2 and convinces him to join the Rebel Alliance, where he forms Grey Squadron in honor of Grey. Shortly before the Battle of Yavin, X2 encounters former bounty hunter Shara and convinces her to join Grey Squadron. Three years later, during the Battle of Hoth, X2 infiltrates a Star Destroyer and plants explosives to destroy it, but runs into X1, who had started training in the Dark Side of the Force. The two clones briefly engage in a duel, before both are forced to escape when the ship is destroyed.

Roughly one year later, following the Battle of Endor and the Empire's defeat, X2 begins training under Luke Skywalker for his inevitable battle with his brother. After locating X1's base at Darth Vader's abandoned castle on Vjun, X2, Shara and the rest of Grey Squadron investigate and manage to track down X1 to Mustafar. There, X1 confronts X2, now a Sith Lord, who has captured Luke and reveals he is planning to build a new Empire under his rule. The two clones engage in a final duel, and X2 emerges victorious. With X1 dead and Luke rescued, Grey Squadron leave Mustafar, with X2 reflecting on the challenges the New Republic has yet to face.

== Development ==
The PlayStation Portable version was developed by Rebellion Developments, who developed the previous Battlefront game, Renegade Squadron. It features twelve campaign missions and a deeper customization system than Renegade Squadron's, boasting "the deepest customization options ever seen in a Star Wars Battlefront title". Players can customize weaponry, armor, species, and other physical attributes. Sixteen player multiplayer is supported, with statistic tracking. The game is played from the traditional third person, over-the-shoulder perspective. On October 25, 2009, a demo was released on the PlayStation Store allowing players to play on the planet Tatooine.

The Nintendo DS version was developed by n-Space, known for the DS installments to the Call of Duty series, World at War and Modern Warfare, and uses a modified version of the same game engine used for the DS version of Star Wars: The Force Unleashed. This version features eleven campaign missions and up to four players via wi-fi connection. The game features no customization, but instead uses the traditional class-based system. It uses an isometric view, similar to a modern dungeon crawler. Unlike classic Battlefront games, Instant Action is played with only four players, usually one from each faction. There are three modes – Free-For-All, Team Game and Hero Mode. Games are won in space by destroying enemy ships to earn points, in capital ships by collecting R2 units, and on the ground by capturing command posts and killing enemies.

== Reception ==
Reception

Aggregate score
Aggregator	Score
Metacritic	(PSP) 63/100 (DS) 61/100

Review scores
Publication	Score
Game Informer	6.75/10
GamePro	3/5
GameRevolution	D+
GameSpot	(PSP) 7/10 (DS) 5/10
IGN	(DS) 6.9/10 (PSP) 6/10
Nintendo Power	5.5/10
Official Nintendo Magazine	73%
PlayStation: The Official Magazine	3.5/5
VideoGamer.com	6/10

Star Wars Battlefront: Elite Squadron received mixed reviews. Metacritic gave it a score of 63 out of 100 for the PSP version, and 61 out of 100 for the DS version.

IGN gave the PSP version a score of 6 out of 10. GameSpot gave the same version 7 out of 10, commending its campaign mode and its three linked battlefronts, as well as the customization options it provides. GameSpot, however, criticized the little impact that the space battles had on the overall outcome, and the controls, calling them "stiff and awkward".

The DS version received a 6.9 out of 10 score from IGN, praising the single-player storyline but stating that the Instant Action feature "leaves a lot to be desired".
