= Star Wars: Force Collection =

2013 video game

- Game logo
- Developer: Konami Digital Entertainment
- Publisher: Konami
- Series: Star Wars
- Platforms: iOS, Android
- Release: September 4, 2013
- Genre: Action (Card game)

Star Wars: Force Collection was an action card game based on the Star Wars franchise, published by Konami for iOS and Android in 2013. It was shut down in 2018.

== Gameplay ==
The game revolves around collecting, trading and upgrading cards featuring content from the Star Wars Skywalker saga (excluding The Rise of Skywalker) and adjacent media such as the Star Wars: The Clone Wars and Star Wars Rebels animated series and Rogue One. Due to being shut down a month before its release, content based on Solo was never released. The last cards to ever be released, variants of Ahsoka Tano and Darth Vader, were based on the Rebels episode "Twilight of the Apprentice".

The game depicts characters, events and vehicles from both the original and prequel trilogies, with The Force Awakens and The Last Jedi being the only films from the sequel trilogy to be featured. In addition, Rogue One is the only anthology film to be featured in the game, and The Clone Wars and Rebels characters and vehicles are also available. A star system is used to denote rarity, with the most common being 1-star and the rarest being 5-stars. The player can set a specific card as their "leader", which provides a boost to friendly cards if it shares the same Force alignment as the player. Cards have attack, defense, accuracy, evasion and cost, all of which are fixed until the card is upgraded or is affected by a skill that increases their power by a certain level. Most units attack another unit one-on-one but some will attack in different manners, like pierce or sweep attacks that affect more than one unit on the formation. Cards are also categorized by their allegiance or profession, if any, with types. Some cards may feature skills that affect units, be it friendly units or enemies; these skills can activate before or during battle. Such skills can take into account a certain type, such as allegiance; for example, a unit with a Rebel Alliance-centric skill will only affect units holding that type.

These cards can then be set into a formation, "enhanced", "evolved" and "awakened", the latter feature made available as an update to the game. Formations are capped by a cost cap, with an example of a more expensive unit costing 60 points. Formations can be further strengthened with "support cards", which depict certain events throughout the saga. "Stack cards" are cards depicting infantry that can be deployed into one formation tile; they provide a ramping attack and defense level which increases in cost the more are deployed into the formation, but may deplete in battle. Two formations are available, one for offense and one for defense.

There are numerous ways to upgrade cards. Enhancing gives a card more power. Evolutions combine two duplicates of the same card to create a much more powerful version of that card. Awakening, introduced alongside The Force Awakens, exponentially increases the card's power, but requires two separate fully evolved cards and a resource called "Holocrons". Select cards from 3-star rarity onwards could be awakened, with the developers adding the ability to awaken more existing cards to the game through post-launch updates. All cards ever since the first Rey and Kylo Ren cards are awakenable. All of these actions require "credits", a soft currency earned through gameplay and selling cards. A card's skill, if present, can be enhanced to increase its potency.

Players obtain cards by going on quests based on the first six films. A player's ability to partake in quests is limited by their current energy points, which can be refilled; this also applies to battle points, which are consumed when players engage in any battle. In addition, cards may be obtained from card packs, most of which are obtainable through purchasing them with real currency; however, their contents are randomized - for example, a card pack may have the chance of obtaining cards of rarity levels 3- to 5-stars. A card pack that can be redeemed with ally points can be drawn, with a very rare chance to obtain rarer cards. Card packs and their respective tickets to redeem certain packs can also be obtained through gameplay and events. Certain cards or items may also be obtained through "Watto's Junkyard", where players can exchange "Wupiupi Coins" to obtain a card or item of their liking. "Wupiupi Coins" cannot be purchased with real currency. Players can also trade cards in the game, with a market being created by the playerbase to compare a certain card's value in PvP compared to another.

Once obtained, cards and vehicles are introduced into the player's "Card Archive", which documents all the cards and vehicles in the game. There are three starting cards in the game; Luke Skywalker, Han Solo and Yoda. However, the player can only have one starting card with them at all times, denoted as a "Special Card" which they obtain when first starting the game. These cards may be enhanced but not evolved nor awakened.

Upon starting the game, the player runs into Princess Leia, who assists the player in repelling an Imperial attack. Once the player secures victory, they are drawn by both sides of the Force and can align themselves to either; the player can either strengthen their connection to their chosen side or be gradually sworn towards the other side by battling other players in player-versus-player combat. Player-versus-player combat is essential to the player's "Proving Grounds" level. There are fourteen levels, with the fourteenth housing players with high-levelled units.

Once built after obtaining six blueprint pieces, vehicles may be upgraded or placed into the formation and cards, some of which provide vehicle-specific bonuses, can be set as their pilots. Player-versus-player combat can also yield blueprints, which players can use to build vehicles to embolster their formation or for use in "Legions at War" events. Such events are accessible if the player has joined a "legion" (guild), where they can work together with other players to board, swarm and attack an enemy legion's capital ship.

Special events were held throughout the game's life. These events gave players the chance to win cards, blueprints and items. Examples of special events were a trivia questionnaire held for the original film's 40th anniversary, a Contra minigame, an event where players can battle a specific themed formation to gain rewards, and map-based quests like the Revenge of the Bosses event. The final event was the Player Appreciation Festival event held from February to April 2018, when the game began its sunset.

== Reception ==
Reception

Aggregate score
Aggregator	Score
Metacritic	61/100

Review scores
Publication	Score
Gamezebo	80/100
MacLife	2/5
Pocket Gamer	3/5
Digital Spy	1/5

The game received "mixed" reviews according to the review aggregation website Metacritic.
