= Star Wars Episode I: The Gungan Frontier =

1999 video game

- Developer: Lucas Learning
- Publisher: Lucas Learning
- Series: Star Wars
- Platforms: Macintosh, Windows
- Release: 1999
- Genres: Life simulation, educational

Star Wars: Episode I - The Gungan Frontier is a 1999 video game by Lucas Learning.

== Plot and gameplay ==
In a game similar to SimLife, the player aims to create a new ecology for Gungan colonisers by using the sacred creature known as the Kresch to build a new home on the moon given to the player by Boss Nass.

== Critical reception ==
Superkids wrote that the game would both challenge and delight aspiring ecologists and population biologists. Robn Kester of Inside Mac Gamers praised the game's unique style, while acknowledging its flaws. Allgame's Brad Cook thought the graphics were substandard.

=== Awards and nominations ===
Year	Nominee / work	Award	Result
December 1999	Star Wars Episode I: The Gungan Frontier	Family Life: Best of the Year	Won
December 1999	Star Wars Episode I: The Gungan Frontier	Choosing Children's Software Magazine: Best Picks for the Holidays Award	Won
September 1999	Star Wars Episode I: The Gungan Frontier	Parent's Guide to Children's Media: Outstanding Achievement in Computer Programs	Won
September 1999	Star Wars Episode I: The Gungan Frontier	The National Association for Gifted Children: Parenting for High Potential; 1999 Holiday Educational Toy List	Won
September 1999	Star Wars Episode I: The Gungan Frontier	NewMedia INVISION '99: Gold in Education, Youth	Won
August 1999	Star Wars Episode I: The Gungan Frontier	Technology & Learning Magazine award	Won
