= Star Wars Episode I: Insider's Guide =

- Developer: LucasArts
- Release: 1999
- Operating system: Macintosh, Windows

Star Wars Episode I: Insider's Guide is a 1999 multimedia CD-ROM from LucasArts. It is designed as a sequel to Star Wars: Behind the Magic.

== Summary ==
Insider's Guide features media from the movie, interviews with the creator George Lucas, character profiles, technology overviews, locations, further details about the Phantom Menace, information on the making of the movie and a glossary of terms.

== Development ==
Star Wars Episode I: Insider's Guide was announced in June 1999.

== Reception ==
All Game Guide gave the Macintosh version a score of 4.5 out of 5, saying "This is a program you will not soon tire of" They gave the PC version a score of 4 out of 5, calling it "the ultimate source for anything and everything related to The Phantom Menace".

The Charlotte Observer gave it a C rating saying "If you're a fan, you'll love it. If not, we advise to leave it alone.

The Birmingham News called it a must-have for Star Wars collectors and fans.
