= Star Wars: Super Bombad Racing =

2001 video game

- North American box art
- Developer: Lucas Learning
- Publisher: LucasArts
- Series: Star Wars
- Engine: RenderWare
- Platform: PlayStation 2
- Release: NA: April 25, 2001; EU: May 25, 2001
- Genres: Racing, vehicular combat
- Modes: Single-player, multiplayer

Star Wars: Super Bombad Racing is a 2001 racing and vehicular combat game with characters from Star Wars: Episode I – The Phantom Menace (1999), Star Wars (1977), and Return of the Jedi (1983). The playable characters are portrayed in a super deformed style (featuring unusually large heads and small bodies). This game is available on PlayStation 2 only, as the Dreamcast, Windows, and Mac OS versions were cancelled due to poor sales of the PlayStation 2 version.

== Gameplay ==
Super Bombad Racing features characters and locales from Star Wars: Episode I – The Phantom Menace.

Star Wars: Super Bombad Racing is a kart racing game. Players select one of various Star Wars: Episode I – The Phantom Menace characters to compete on various courses patterned after the film. Each course also features a reversed, mirrored variant. Boba Fett and Darth Vader appear as unlockable guest characters. Races are conducted with eight competitors and consist of three laps. Powerups are littered throughout each course, and each provides the player character with varying temporary attributes, such as a boost in speed, a shield, or offensive weaponry. Up to four players can join in splitscreen play using the PlayStation 2 multitap peripheral.

A variant on the standard race mode, known as "Teams", limits the race to four competitors, each split into teams of two. An Arena mode is also included. Here the player controls their character in a vehicular combat scenario. Powerups from the racing modes are used, but instead of navigating a race course the objective is to eliminate enemy characters and be the last character standing. Nine race courses and four arenas are available to choose from.

== Development and marketing ==
The game was developed by LucasArts subsidiary Lucas Learning as its first entertainment-only title, and was the final title developed under that brand. The concept for the game was created by Lucas Learning, and the decision was made for them to serve as developer and publisher for the title. Development took close to two years, and at its peak consisted of over 20 people. The music was composed by Peter McConnell, and features cartoon-like, satirical renditions of John Williams' Star Wars score. McConnell had previously worked on soundtracks for other LucasArts games such as Grim Fandango and Full Throttle. Some actors from the films reprise their roles in the game. Jake Lloyd voices Anakin Skywalker, Ahmed Best returns as Jar Jar Binks, and Lewis MacLeod again voices Sebulba. Grey Griffin, Tom Kane and Kevin Michael Richardson are among the voice actors used to voice double the remaining characters. Lucas Learning utilized RenderWare from Criterion Software as the engine to power Super Bombad Racing.

In early May 2000, leaked information revealed Star Wars: Super Bombad Racing was in development. It was officially unveiled at E3 2000. The game was later promoted at the Sony Metreon in San Francisco, California in April 2001. Copies of the game signed by George Lucas were raffled away. It was released in North America on April 25, 2001 and in Europe on May 25. Super Bombad Racing is a PlayStation 2 exclusive. Additional releases were planned for the Sega Dreamcast, Windows, and Mac OS. These were cancelled due to poor sales.

== Reception ==
Reception

Aggregate score
Aggregator	Score
Metacritic	71/100

Review scores
Publication	Score
AllGame	3/5
Electronic Gaming Monthly	3.67/10 (Note: Three critics of Electronic Gaming Monthly gave the game each a score of 2.5/10, 4/10, and 4.5/10.)
EP Daily	7.5/10
Game Informer	2.5/10
GameRevolution	B
GameSpot	6.2/10
GameSpy	80%
GameZone	8.5/10
IGN	7.8/10
Next Generation	2/5
Official U.S. PlayStation Magazine	2/5
X-Play	3/5

The game received "mixed or average" reviews according to the review aggregation website Metacritic. Some praised the game, calling it an accomplished kart racer and a welcome addition to the then-short list of PlayStation 2 titles. Others, however, felt that while the game was mechanically sound, the Star Wars setting and appearance felt "tacked on" and therefore a dirty ploy to make money for LucasArts. Others roundly criticized the game, both for turning Star Wars into a childish kart racer and for simply making a bad game. Shahed Ahmed of GameSpot said that the game introduced a few clever concepts, but was critical of the length and flaws relating to the gameplay. Uncle Dust of GamePro said that the game "offers enough challenge and replay value to be a good party game for younger Star Wars fans." (Note: GamePro gave the game two 4/5 scores for graphics and fun factor, 4.5/5 for sound, and 3.5/5 for control.) However, Jeff Lundrigan of NextGen said of the game in its negative review, "We've said it before, but the world really does not need another licensed kart racing game."

Retrospective opinions on the game were sometimes more critical. GamesRadar+'s Henry Gilbert included Super Bombad Racing in a list of "The most forgettable kart racers ever released". In contrast the IGN staff included it in a list of "The 11 Goofiest Weirdest Silliest Strangest Funniest Dumbest Star Wars Video Games Ever". It also appeared in Game Informer's list of "The 8 Strangest Kart Racing Games". They also listed is as the 2nd worst Star Wars game in 2015.
