= Star Wars Battlefront: Renegade Squadron =

2007 video game

- North American cover art
- Developer: Rebellion Developments
- Publisher: LucasArts
- Producer: James Smith
- Designer: Mike Rosser
- Programmer: Richard May
- Artist: Daniel Meeuws
- Writer: Gordon Rennie
- Series: Star Wars: Battlefront
- Platform: PlayStation Portable
- Release: NA: October 9, 2007; AU: October 10, 2007; EU: October 12, 2007
- Genre: Third-person shooter
- Modes: Single-player, multiplayer

Star Wars Battlefront: Renegade Squadron is a third-person shooter video game based on the Star Wars franchise. It is the third entry in the Star Wars: Battlefront series and the first handheld exclusive. It was released on October 9, 2007 in North America and later in Australia and Europe, as a PlayStation Portable (PSP) exclusive. Renegade Squadron was one of the first games available in a bundle pack with the newly released PSP redesign.

The game's single-player campaign follows the eponymous Rebel Alliance covert ops unit Renegade Squadron and depicts various battles throughout the Galactic Civil War from their perspective, starting with their formation by Han Solo prior to the Battle of Yavin, and ending with the Battle of Endor, which marked the defeat of Galactic Empire. The campaign is part of the now non-canonical Star Wars Legends continuity. The game also features several types of multiplayer modes. In contrast with previous titles in the series that require characters to have a set class, players in Renegade Squadron are able to build their character as they see fit.

Renegade Squadron received a mixed reaction from the video gaming community. The game was considered an improvement to its predecessor (the PSP version of Star Wars: Battlefront II) and it was praised for its customization options and online play, but the single-player campaign was criticized for being brief and shallow. Opinions on the graphics were mixed, and the controls were generally described as inadequate.

== Gameplay ==
The overall structure of Renegade Squadron is similar to other games in the Battlefront series in that it is a war game played primarily from a third-person view. Battles take place on the ground and in space and require the player to capture command posts, specific areas of territory represented by floating icons on the playing field and colored dots on the player's heads-up display. Each map has a set number of command posts, and it is beneficial for the player to occupy as many as possible (space battles use a modified command post system). Each side has a set number of reinforcement tickets at the beginning of the battle—any time a soldier dies, that team loses one ticket when that soldier respawns. To win a match, a player must capture every command post or reduce their opponent's ticket count to zero.

At the ending of each mission, every time the character respawns, and when at a command post, it is possible for the player to adjust their character's weapons, appearance, and other traits to their liking. The player gets 100 credits to purchase weapons and equipment for their character. In previous games in the series, players chose a character's class before battle from a list of pre-made options, such as pilot or other regular infantry units. Each class had a specific combination of weapons and equipment. Before Renegade Squadron's release, LucasArts stated that the customization engine would allow millions of different character combinations. Another new feature allows players to enter asteroid bases on some space maps. In addition, players can earn medals by achieving set objectives, such as destroying a certain number of spaceships.

=== Single-player ===
There are three options for single play: the campaign, instant action, and galactic conquest. During the story campaign, the player takes control of Renegade Squadron, under the command of Col Serra and occasionally Han Solo. Serra describes the formation of the unit in the beginning cutscene of the campaign; the player then starts a series of missions with a range of different objectives, with voiced cutscenes in a static, motion comic style between the missions to provide background information and move the story along. The final mission features the Battle of Endor, where the objectives are similar to the corresponding footage in Return of the Jedi.

Players have the ability to customize the appearance and weaponry of their individual characters.

With instant action, players are able to take part in battles against computer-controlled opponents. There are four types of missions. Conquest is the Battlefront standard and pits two opposing forces against each other on a space or ground map, with the objective of controlling all of the command posts on the map, or defeating every member of the opposing force. There are also three variants of capture the flag, including a new mode called Hero flag, whereby players are permitted to control famous Star Wars characters during standard flag battles by physically carrying their team's flag. These heroes span the Clone Wars and Civil War periods and include Asajj Ventress, Jango Fett, and Kit Fisto.

A holdover from previous Battlefront games, galactic conquest is played as a type of turn-based board game with segmented turns, similar to Risk. The board is a simplified representation of the Star Wars galaxy, with four quadrants containing several planets each. The player and the AI opponent each start with several planets (including a headquarters planet which has more reinforcements), which generate revenue each turn in the form of galactic credits. Credits are used to purchase reinforcements and hire special commanders, who are leaders like Admiral Ackbar and Tarkin. During each turn, a player is allowed to move reinforcements around their controlled planets and attack opponent-controlled planets. Attacking a planet initiates either a ground or space battle, which can be fought manually or automatically. The player wins by conquering all of their opponent's planets.

=== Multiplayer ===
In addition to the single-player story missions, Renegade Squadron allows up to 16 players to compete via the PSP's infrastructure mode, which is a Wi-Fi internet connection. It can also support eight-person matches with ad-hoc, which is a local connectivity option for players in close physical proximity. The multiplayer game types are limited to conquest and capture the flag. A GameSpy network account is required to play using infrastructure, and offers players a rankings system so they can track their performance.

== Plot ==
Renegade Squadron takes place during the original Star Wars film trilogy, mostly during and in-between The Empire Strikes Back and Return of the Jedi. Some time after the conclusion of the Galactic Civil War with the defeat of the Galactic Empire, the New Jedi Order is formed by Luke Skywalker. The game begins with Tionne Solusar, the New Jedi Order's chief historian, researching the forces of the Rebel Alliance during the Galactic Civil War. Tionne finds several vague references to a "Renegade Squadron" and its commander, Col Serra, who were apparently involved in covert ops missions during the war. Tionne manages to contact Serra and he candidly relates the entire history of the unit. The single-player campaign follows the major exploits of Renegade Squadron throughout the war, as told in flashbacks by Serra to Tionne.

Renegade Squadron is formed shortly before the Battle of Yavin at the request of Han Solo and General Jan Dodonna, who are looking for experienced warriors who require no additional training. Solo contacts one of his former smuggling associates, Col Serra, and asks him to help. Serra agrees to Solo's request and puts together a unit of mercenaries, bounty hunters, smugglers, and other fringe-types who will work behind-the-scenes to further the goals of the Alliance. All of the members of Renegade Squadron are wanted by the Empire and generally harbor an intense hatred for it, ensuring that they will remain loyal to the Alliance.

Under Serra's command, the unit is responsible for several operations undertaken for the Alliance throughout the war. The unit operates in secrecy and is able to work anonymously at several major incidents, including the Battles of Yavin, Hoth, and Endor. The unit is made up of skilled pilots in addition to ground operatives, and, as such, is able to assist in missions both in space and planetside. The unit is considered elite by the Alliance, and despite its anonymity, takes part in several high-profile battles against Imperials, including the bounty hunter IG-88 and the Sith Lord Darth Vader. After the Battle of Endor, which marks the ultimate defeat of the Empire, the squadron is disbanded, its purpose fulfilled. Its surviving members disappear, many of them returning to their former criminal roots.

== Development ==
"First off, we all know about the fact that the game is built from the ground up for the PSP. From this we crafted a twofold mission statement, or main goal for the project: 1) Deliver a fun, compelling game with all the features and highlights of a traditional Battlefront experience that the millions of fans out there have come to expect.
2) Consider the PSP audience that likes to play games on the go and sometimes for shorter periods of time compared to the consoles."

— K.C. Coleman, assistant producer at LucasArts

LucasArts announced Renegade Squadron in May 2007. The announcement stated that the game would be the only original Battlefront game of 2007, and it was to be developed by British-based independent game design company Rebellion Developments. Despite having never worked on a Star Wars game, Rebellion had prior development experience with other PlayStation Portable titles, such as a port of the third-person shooter game Gun.

The game's developers made it clear that it was being designed specifically for the PSP. LucasArts made this decision after Rebellion convinced them that the PSP's multiplayer capabilities were well-suited to another Battlefront game, in addition to the strong sales of Battlefront II on the PSP. The game's lead designer, Mike Rosser, stated that the development team tried to retain some aspects of Battlefront II, specifically its "fast and furious action". Other elements borrowed from Battlefront II included the controls—LucasArts solicited feedback from players of the previous game and subsequently decided to make Renegade Squadron's controls more "arcadey" so players could learn them faster. After screenshots of the game were released, several forum posts from fans complained about the game's visuals compared to its predecessor. In response, Rosser claimed that Renegade Squadron "boasts a longer view distance, higher resolution textures and better lighting".

The design team stated repeatedly that the focus of Renegade Squadron was its customization system. There were initially concerns in Rebellion that the feature would lead to unbalanced gameplay; lead programmer Richard May stated he was "worried it might lead to uber-classes and be a balancing nightmare, losing some of the trade-off structure that the old class system provided." Prolific testing of the game eventually assured LucasArts that the system had been implemented appropriately.

The game's setting was based primarily on the Clone Wars and Civil War eras of Star Wars history. Rebellion took inspiration for several missions from comments made in passing from the Star Wars films. Rosser stated in an interview, "For instance, a diversionary attack on Sullust is mentioned during a conversation between Vader and the Emperor in Return of the Jedi. In Renegade Squadron, you'll get to take part in that attack." The planet of Boz Pity was similarly mentioned in Star Wars: Episode III – Revenge of the Sith but wasn't portrayed in the movie, so Renegade Squadron's artists took the opportunity to create the planet based on ancient Cambodian architecture like Angkor Wat. Concept art for the game was provided by Rebellion's comic artists, and the cutscenes were based on the company's comic properties like 2000 AD. While storyboarding the in-game cinematics, Rebellion assistant producer James Valls was careful to ensure that Renegade Squadron was in accordance with established Star Wars canon.

=== Release ===
Renegade Squadron was featured at the LucasArts booth at Comic-Con 2007 as part of the "25 Years of LucasArts Games" display, along with other upcoming games like Lego Indiana Jones: The Original Adventures and The Force Unleashed. The game was released on October 9, 2007, in North America, and on October 10 and 12 in Australia and Europe respectively. LucasArt's official launch event was at the Sony PlayStation Store in the Metreon shopping center in San Francisco. Star Wars fans attended in costume, including the 501st Squadron, a large Star Wars cosplaying fanclub. Attendees were eligible to win several prizes. In addition, the first 200 customers to purchase Sony's new Star Wars PSP bundle were given a Han Solo-in-carbonite case for their PSP. The bundle was announced in July 2007 as the second available PSP-2000 bundle (after Daxter) and titled the Star Wars Battlefront PSP Entertainment Pack. Bundled PSPs were presented in a white case with a black silkscreen of Darth Vader on the battery cover, in addition to the copy of Renegade Squadron.

LucasArts and Rebellion have discussed downloadable content for Renegade Squadron, but were not strongly invested in exploring the prospect during the game's development. LucasArts has also stated that issues with Sony have hindered its implementation. Rebellion has considered the possibility of a comic book or novel based on Renegade Squadron.

== Reception ==
Reception

Aggregate scores
Aggregator	Score
GameRankings	72%
Metacritic	73/100

Review scores
Publication	Score
1Up.com	C+
Eurogamer	6/10
GameSpot	8/10
GameTrailers	8.2/10
GameZone	8/10
IGN	7.9/10

Critical reception of the game was mixed, and as of March 2009 it holds a score of 73/100 on media aggregator site Metacritic, which indicates "mixed or average reviews". Reviewers praised the game's customization options and multiplayer, and it was accepted as marginally superior to Battlefront II on PSP, though one reviewer stated "it's not a true sequel." The game won the Reader's PSP Game of the Month Award from IGN for October 2007, with one fan stating that the game was more "Star Wars-like" than its predecessor. It was the second best-selling PSP game in the US the week of its release and was still among the list of GameFly's most-rented PSP games in December 2007. It continued to be a top seller in the US and UK several months after its release. The game was later re-released as a Greatest Hits title, indicating that it had sold at least 250,000 copies.

Comments about Renegade Squadron's controls were mostly negative, and they were typically described as clumsy or sluggish. GameZone referred to the space dogfights as "unplayable" and Eurogamer called the lock-on feature "a waste of time". One reviewer complained about the PSP's lack of a second analog nub. Despite the criticism, a few reviewers were more favorable towards the controls, with GameSpot noting that they were an improvement over Battlefront II.

Reviewers were polarized on the game's graphics. The cutscenes during the single-player campaign were accepted positively, but reception of the in-game visuals was less glowing. GamePro stated that the "character and vehicle models look great", but the visuals were also described as "blah" and "substandard". GameDaily said "the graphics look good but there's a lack of polish."

Though the single-player campaign was criticized for being short, Renegade Squadron's multiplayer was widely praised. GameSpot noted that the game included an infrastructure mode, a feature which Battlefront II did not have, and GameZone commented that the game ran smoothly in multiplayer even when handling the maximum number of players. GameSpy described the multiplayer as "fantastic", and GamesRadar said that it promised hours of satisfaction. Many reviewers said that the multiplayer was the most important part of the game, with some of the less positive reviews advising players to play the game primarily for the multiplayer experience.
