= Star Wars: Droid Works =

1998 video game

- Developer: Lucas Learning
- Publisher: Lucas Learning
- Designer: Collette Michaud
- Programmer: Jonathan Blossom
- Artist: Richard Herron
- Writers: Collette Michaud; John Whitman
- Series: Star Wars
- Engine: Sith (rendering and gameplay); INSANE (cutscenes and video)
- Platforms: Windows, Mac OS
- Release: NA: October 21, 1998
- Genre: Educational
- Mode: Single-player

Star Wars: DroidWorks is a 1998 edutainment computer game and the premiere title from LucasArts subsidiary Lucas Learning. It uses the same engine as LucasArts' previous title Star Wars Jedi Knight: Dark Forces II. The creators aimed to create a game that would be both appealing and nonviolent. The game's original release date was moved up by months, which resulted in the development team cutting some planned game features.

The game's plot involves the player saving the galaxy by manufacturing droids with specific abilities, such as the ability to see in the dark or jump, to complete missions. The educational portions of these missions teach players about concepts such as energy, force, motion, simple machines, light, and magnetism.

Star Wars: DroidWorks received high praise from critics, sold well, and won numerous awards and accolades.

== Plot and gameplay ==
In Star Wars: Droid Works the player can customize their droid to perform tasks needed.

C-3PO, R2-D2, and the player are sent by the Rebellion to Tatooine to shut down production at an Imperial droid factory. In the tutorial, the player must complete eight training missions and four secret missions, each requiring droids with specific abilities, before proceeding to the droid factory. In the Jawa Droid Workshop, players can paint and name their creations and get a full 360-degree view of other works in progress.

Overall, the player can choose from 87 droid parts, which can be combined in 25 million different combinations. Through experiential learning, players learn about the scientific principles of energy, force, motion, simple machines, light, and magnetism. Players are also encouraged to utilize mathematics, logic, and critical thinking. An in-game 'InDex' provides explanations on various scientific concepts through internet links.

== Development and release ==
=== Conception ===
The game was developed by Lucas Learning, which was originally created to produce consumer products but was re-imagined as a developer of direct-to-school products in the fall of 1998. Star Wars: DroidWorks was the first title from Lucas Learning and eventually became one of a series of Star Wars games to be released as edutainment titles. This game marked George Lucas' first foray into the edutainment market. Lucas' directive to the company was to design a game that would allow players to explore and create in a manner similar to playing with Erector Sets and Lego. DroidWorks was only one out of a total of 175 titles created by third-party software developers for the newly launched iMac. Susan Schilling, the general manager of Lucas Learning, and Clent Richardson, the senior director of worldwide developer relations at Apple Computer, agreed that the Apple Mac was the best platform for the game.

The game was initially conceived by project leader, Collette Michaud, who pitched a game where players could design their own Star Wars droid and watch them move. As the game shifted toward a physics-based educational puzzle game mid-development, resources were redirected accordingly. Susan Schilling said that DroidWorks did not require the player to use bombs or guns, noting that the only weapon required is the player's mind. The team made a concerted effort to make the game equally appealing to all children; recent research had shown that children liked interactive software and to "make their own story", so the team wanted the program to encourage learning about math, science, and computers. It would be the player's decisions and curiosity that would ultimately lead to his or her success. In a press release, Lucas Learning described DroidWorks as a "unique combination of construction set and strategy game". The development team consulted with both a kid advisory group and subject matter experts to make the game appealing to young players and scientifically accurate.

=== Design ===
The game uses audio tracks similar to those from the film series and includes clips from the original Star Wars trilogy. It uses the same first-person shooter engine as many other contemporary LucasArts' titles. The game was built using a modified version of the Sith game engine which was developed for LucasArts' Jedi Knight: Dark Forces II, with changes to ensure that the physics engine would be realistic. While the Star Wars universe was known for its combative atmosphere, the design team tried to incorporate minimal violence. This approach is visible in the ways players progress - rather than pitting the player's droid against enemies, the landscape itself becomes an obstacle passable to only certain droid types. This effectively prevents those who have not yet acquired the parts necessary to complete a level from doing so. One of the removed features would have allowed players to place droid parts in locations other than where they were intended, for instance, an arm could be attached to a droid's head.

=== Release ===
While the developers planned a "luxurious" development schedule which would have culminated in the game's release in Christmas 1998, the marketing department thought the game should be released on Labor Day instead. This new deadline meant that various cuts had to be made to the design. A demo of the game premiered at the 1998 Macworld Expo.

That June, The Washington Times reported that the game was scheduled for release (for both Macintosh and PC) in September. Ultimately, the game missed the Labor Day deadline and was released on 21 October. The game was directly made available to schools, along with other edutainment titles from Lucas Learning. The game was marketed and packaged as an entertainment title, and was advertised in gaming magazines and Family PC.

The developers' original claim that the game blurred the line between entertainment and education presented difficulties for marketers as they had to decide whether to place the game on "game" or "education" shelves. In March 1999, the game was "currently available wherever software is sold". By June, however, the game was noted as being sold at two-store specialty groups. Fortunately, LucasArts' previous successes and association with the Star Wars title enabled DroidWorks to be distributed at retail stores, such as Walmart and Costco.

== Reception ==
Sandra Vogel of The Scotsman noted that, while part of the game's success was due to its association with George Lucas, it had a "pedigree all its own", including a series of gaming awards. Multimedia Schools praised its user-friendliness, tutorials, replayability, and the ease of installation, giving the title 5 stars. Computer Shopper noted that while the game was an exploitation of the Star Wars brand, it used the association to ensure the "productive" game received an audience. Similarly, Daily Record wrote that the title was "yet another spin-off from the incredible marketing hype" of the upcoming film, but praised the game for its imagination, magic, and 3D environments. The Washington Times thought the game would appeal to all fans of the Star Wars sequel trilogy. Daily Herald said the game had a broader appeal than the computer-programming video game The Robot Club. Knight Ridder said the game offered an opportunity for parents and children to work together to build robots and solve missions, in a method similar to the tradition of building Soap Box Derby racers, and praised its slick graphics. The Washington Post thought the game was a worthy piece of kidware. Birmingham Evening Mail praised the game's blend of fun and education. The Boston Globe thought it was a standout educational title. Rocky Mountain News complimented the game's ease of use, sense of humor, and surreptitious educational content.

KidsWorld said the game was "slow and jerky" on a 133 Pentium, and recommended at least a 166 Pentium, or above. Computer Gaming World gave the game 4/5 stars, writing as a minor criticism that, while the game features millions of possible robots, only a select few are useful in the game. Boys' Life praised the educational content, but thought that some of the environments were creepy. ICR and Literacy included a transcript of three children playing the game, which demonstrated how one child was learning how to interpret the game's symbols and articulate herself. PC Magazine praised the game for its ability to make learning fun. Complete Sourcebook on Children's Software (1999, Vol. 7) gave it a rating of 4.5/5 stars. Lisa Karen Savignano of AllGame wrote that the game successfully combined puzzle solving, education and action into an enjoyable title. SuperKids offered a rave review, deeming the program both "intellectually stimulating" and "viscerally captivating", noting that their playtests had brought out a rare "curiosity-driven patience and tenacity" in the young gamers. PC Accelerator thought the game proved that "educational game" was an oxymoron and suggested that people would have been more interested in prequel games.

The game was included in National Association for Gifted Children magazine's Parenting for High Potential 1999 list of favorite holiday educational toys, and commented that the game sufficiently challenges young players. In January, Software Industry Report noted that the game was a popular title on the Mac. Playthings, in June, noted that the PC game was selling "robustly" at $30.

=== Awards and accolades ===
From October 1998 to March 1999, the game received seven awards, including the BAFTA Interactive Entertainment award and two New Media Invision awards, and was "singled out by several prominent educational software newsletters, magazines and Web sites". By May 1999, the game had received two more awards. The game was the highest-rated science software title from 1999 to 2000. While noting that they had previously never considered including educational software in their list, the game was featured in Parenting for High Potential.

Year	Nominee / work	Award	Result
November 1998	Star Wars DroidWorks	BAFTA Interactive Entertainment Award: Children's Category	Won
December 1998	Star Wars DroidWorks	SuperKids Software Award for Best of 1998: Best in Science	Won
December 1998	Star Wars DroidWorks	BrainPlay.com Award for Best Software of 1998: Best Game	Won
December 1998	Star Wars DroidWorks	Games Industry News award for Educational Game of the Year 1998	Won
Winter 1998–99	Star Wars DroidWorks	Choosing Children's Software Magazine: Best Picks for the Holidays	Won
December 1998	Star Wars DroidWorks	New Media INVISION Award: Award of Excellence	Won
December 1998	Star Wars DroidWorks	New Media INVISION Award – Gold: Children/Young Adult	Won
March 1999	Star Wars DroidWorks	CODIE Award for Children's Educational Game of 1998	Won
1999	Star Wars DroidWorks	Codie award for Best New Home Education For Pre-Teens	Won
1999	Star Wars DroidWorks	The Computer Museum of Boston's pick for Best Software for Kids Gallery for the 1998–99 holiday season	Won
August 1999	Star Wars DroidWorks	Technology & Learning Magazine: 1999–2000 Software Awards of Excellence	Won
August 1999	Star Wars DroidWorks	Association for Supervision and Curriculum Development – Only the Best: The Annual Guide to the Highest-Rated Educational Software and Multimedia	Won
September 1999	Star Wars DroidWorks	The National Association for Gifted Children - Parenting for High Potential: 1999 Holiday Educational Toy List	Won
October 2001	Star Wars DroidWorks	Learning Magazine 2002 Teachers' Choice Award	Won
