= Star Wars: Rebel Assault II: The Hidden Empire =

1995 video game

- Developers: LucasArts; Factor 5 (PS)
- Publisher: LucasArts
- Director: Hal Barwood
- Designer: Vince Lee
- Programmer: Vince Lee
- Artists: Richard Green; Aaron Muszalski
- Composer: Peter McConnell
- Series: Star Wars
- Engine: INSANE
- Platforms: DOS, Windows, PlayStation, Mac OS
- Release: November 24, 1995 (DOS); November 26, 1996 (PS)
- Genre: Rail shooter
- Mode: Single-player

Star Wars: Rebel Assault II: The Hidden Empire is a 1995 rail shooter video game developed by LucasArts. It is the sequel to Star Wars: Rebel Assault, set in the Star Wars expanded universe. The player character, Rookie One, pilots ships such as a YT-1300 Corellian Transport, a B-wing, and a Y-wing, and encounters new enemy ships, including TIE Interceptors. They uncover, and eventually disable production of, a new TIE variant known as the TIE Phantom, which has the ability to cloak.

It contains mostly original filming with actors and stunts, while the scenery and the space scenes were 3D rendered. According to LucasArts' magazine, The Adventurer, the game was the first media to incorporate live-action actors and footage in the Star Wars universe since Return of the Jedi. The player proceeds down predetermined paths, but has the ability to control aiming, shooting, and dodging. The game makes use of Lucasarts' proprietary INSANE game engine. The game received mixed reception upon release. While critics generally praised the visuals, many cited frustrations with the game's control scheme. It has since been featured in worst-of lists by IGN and Kotaku.

== Gameplay ==
Rebel Assault II is played as a rail shooter. The player can take cover from incoming fire during on-foot sequences.

Star Wars: Rebel Assault II: The Hidden Empire is played as a rail shooter; the player proceeds down predetermined paths, but has the ability to control aiming, shooting, and dodging. The player uses a mouse or gamepad to navigate, attack or dodge specific elements while interactive, pre-rendered video plays on screen. Action sequences take place both in starships and on-foot. While on-foot the player can control whether the protagonist is taking cover, or leaning out to shoot enemies. Flight sequences are divided into two variants. Sequences which involve attacking enemy ships are in first-person, and feature a cockpit view. Here the player has more control over aiming their fire and less over steering the craft. Third-person sequences largely consist of areas where the player must navigate tight spaces while dodging obstacles. Here the focus is on control of the ship, with little to no emphasis on attack. In addition to save games a passcode system is used to restore progress. With each mission completion players receive a password to return to that point in the story.

== Plot ==
After the destruction of the first Death Star, Darth Vader has begun a new project for the Galactic Empire. Meanwhile, in the Rebel Alliance, rumors have grown concerning "ghost ships" attacking Rebel patrols.

Rookie One (played by Jamison Jones), while flying with his wingman on patrol near the planet Dreighton, receives a distress call from a YT-1300 transport, the Corellia Star, which is being attacked by TIE fighters. The pilot has crucial information about the Empire's new project. After fighting off several TIE Fighters, Rookie One's wingman is destroyed by an unseen attacker, and Rookie One's ship is shot down, but he is able to eject himself before the rest of his ship explodes and crash lands on Dreighton, where the captured transport had been forced to land. Having survived the crash landing, Rookie One follows a tracking scanner to an Imperial station, where the Corellia Star is being held. After fighting stormtroopers, he finds the transport and its information, but the station's doors close before he can escape, forcing him to fly through the mining tunnels. He is able to find another way out and escapes through hyperspace.

Back at Pinnacle Base, Admiral Ackbar helps the pilots understand the message from the freighter. The Alliance learns that the Empire has constructed a secret mining facility in the asteroid belt of Arah, somewhere in the Dreighton Nebula, and Rookie One is sent along with a squadron of X-wings to destroy it. Along the way, they encounter derillium minefields and TIE Interceptors. The facility is not simply mining ore, but is supplying rare metals required to manufacture the new V38 "Phantom" TIE, equipped with a cloaking device invented by Grand Admiral Sarn; the ore itself is the power source for the cloaking devices. After the squadron opens a way into the facility's reactor core and destroys it, narrowly escaping the blast, squadron leader Ace Merrick is killed along with wingman Ina Rece by an ambush of TIE Phantoms. Rookie One manages to evade the TIEs and escape. At Pinnacle Base, Admiral Ackbar comes up with a plan for two people to infiltrate the facility building the Phantom V38s at Imdaar Alpha and steal one of TIE Phantoms to be used for reverse engineering.

Rookie One takes a crash course in TIE piloting from Admiral Krane with two TIEs stolen from the Empire. Then, they head out to the jump point where they encounter TIE Interceptors. After defeating them, Rookie One heads to Imdaar Alpha alone and encounters sentry guns and force fields along the way. He meets with Ru Murleen (played by Julie Eccles), Rookie One's previous flight instructor from Rebel Assault. They fly to an Imperial Landing Platform on the far side of a swamp on Speeder Bikes. Disguised as stormtroopers, Rookie One and Ru Murleen steal an Imperial shuttle and board Admiral Sarn's cloaked Super Star Destroyer Terror. After defeating numerous stormtroopers within the Super Star Destroyer and later in the maintenance tunnels, they steal a TIE Phantom from the hangar. After the destruction of Terror from inside, along with many other TIE Phantoms, Darth Vader kills Admiral Sarn for his failures and escapes on his TIE Advanced. The Imdaar Alpha facility manufacturing the new fighters suddenly appears on Imdaar's moon, as it was also equipped with a cloaking device that was damaged when the Terror exploded. After destroying the facility and returning to a Rebel base, the leader of the Rebels thanks them for saving the day once again. Darth Vader informs the Emperor of what happened and the stolen TIE Phantom at the Rebel Base self-destructs.

== Development ==
Lucasarts utilized blue screen live action footage (top) and superimposed the actors onto three-dimensional sets (bottom).

Rebel Assault II features live-action actors filmed on a blue screen, with digital backgrounds added in post. The stormtrooper armor, weapons, helmets and suits seen to be worn by the actors, were not made for the game, but are the actual props seen in the original trilogy, taken from the archive storage of Lucasfilm. While most props were taken from the Lucasfilm archives, a few were created for the game. During one sequence the protagonist carries a tracking device. This was fashioned from an old calculator case. For cockpit scenes actors were placed on a rig, which was operated by four grips. The grips moved the rig to simulate movement within the cockpit. Interiors were added digitally in post. For each digital background artists added shadows and lighting adjustments for the live-action elements.

Small storyboard arts panels, known internally as thumbnails, were used to conceptualize each scene before filming. Lucasarts utilized their INteractive Streaming ANimation Engine (INSANE) code library, which had been used in the game's predecessor, Star Wars: Rebel Assault, and in point and click adventure games such as The Dig and Sam & Max Hit the Road. Director Hal Barwood was brought on to direct the live action sequences. A cast of 18 individuals brought the characters to life. Jamison Jones portrays the protagonist Rookie One in both cutscenes and gameplay, while Julie Eccles portrays Ru Murleen, his partner who had been his instructor during the events of Rebel Assault. Actor David Prowse, who portrayed Darth Vader in the original Star Wars films (except for his voice), did not return for Rebel Assault 2. Instead, Vader is portrayed by then-Lucasarts employee C. Andrew Nelson, who reprises the role in other Star Wars games. Similarly, James Earl Jones, the voice of Darth Vader, was replaced by Scott Lawrence, who also has provided the voice of Vader in several Star Wars games.

The game was developed by a team of 15 and took 18 months to complete. Vince Lee served as project leader on the team. It was released for DOS, Windows, PlayStation, and Mac OS in November 1995.

== Reception ==
Reception

Review scores
Publication	Score
GameSpot	7.5/10
Next Generation	2/5
Maximum	2/5
MacUser	3/5

Rebel Assault II was a commercial success. According to market research firm PC Data, it was the 15th-best-selling computer game in the United States for the year 1996. It had been the 10th-biggest seller from January through June that year. By November 30, 1997, the game's computer version had sold 515,578 copies and earned $19.77 million in the United States alone. In 2016 IGN listed it as 10th on its list of the Top 10 Worst Star Wars Games Ever Made. Similarly, Kotaku editor Zack Zwiezen ranked it 16th out of 17 Star Wars space combat games.

Maximum applauded the high video quality of the cinematic sequences but overall panned the game for its controls, stating that "Whether using mouse or joystick ... your vehicle jolts and twitches with a life of its own, and there is nothing you can do about it except to employ tiny steadying movements in the hope that the craft doesn't take offense to your attempt at control and vehemently bounce around the screen." They also criticized the game's linearity, low difficulty, poor acting, and anticlimactic final level. A Next Generation critic similarly found that while the video quality is excellent, the acting is poor and the plot is a thinly veiled rehash of the original Star Wars film. He also argued that the gameplay is too limited, likening it to "a movie that requires you to move a stick around and press a button at certain points until you get to see more of the movie."

=== PlayStation version ===
Reception

Review scores
Publication	Score
AllGame	3.5/5
Electronic Gaming Monthly	5.5/10
Famitsu	7/10, 6/10, 7/10, 6/10
GameSpot	4.9/10
Next Generation	2/5
PlayStation: The Official Magazine	9.5/10

Reviews for the PlayStation version praised the use of the film scores and the graphical enhancements over the PC original (particularly the polygonal ship models and the greater full motion video quality), but criticized the loose controls and low difficulty, and typically commented that while the game offers a variety of scenarios and gameplay styles, none of them offer any real depth or excitement. GamePro, however, gave it a laudatory review, citing the variety of stages, the quality of the cinematic cutscenes, and the clean graphics. Dan Hsu of Electronic Gaming Monthly called it "a very glamorous, very pretty game that drops way short of delivering any true gaming satisfaction", while co-reviewer Sushi-X remarked, "I would like to know how unskilled LucasArts thinks we gamers are. The first time I sat down to play RA2, I beat it." A Next Generation critic said that "while it trades in the PC version's digitized sprites for polygonal spacecraft, alas it's still the same mundane game." GameSpot recommended, "If you're a Star Wars fan, your money is much better spent on the Star Wars Trilogy videotapes or tickets to the big-screen director's-cut re-releases." Famitsu reviewers echoed this, saying it would be highly appealing for Star Wars fans due to the game's dedication to recreating the film's world, but others may find it just to be a generic 3D shooter.
