= Star Wars: X-Wing vs. TIE Fighter =

1997 video game

- Developer: Totally Games
- Publisher: LucasArts
- Designer: Lawrence Holland
- Composer: Peter McConnell
- Series: Star Wars: X-Wing
- Platform: Windows
- Release: NA: April 29, 1997; EU: May 9, 1997
- Genre: Space combat
- Modes: Single-player, multiplayer

Star Wars: X-Wing vs. TIE Fighter is a 1997 space combat game developed by Totally Games for LucasArts. It is the third installment of the X-Wing series.

Featuring several technical advancements over the original releases of its predecessors, X-Wing vs. TIE Fighter runs on Windows, requires a joystick, features a CD audio soundtrack, supports high-resolution graphics, and brings texture mapping to the ship models of the in-flight game engine. It includes robust multiplayer options for up to eight players in free-for-all, team-based, and cooperative play modes, and has a sophisticated pilot and mission selection system that tracks the player's points and awards. In addition to selecting what craft they will fly, the player can choose their squadron (and thus role in combat) for each mission.

While all content could be played single-player, it is the only part of the series designed primarily for multiplayer, and it lacked a story-driven campaign. LucasArts later released an expansion called Balance of Power to satisfy popular demand for story-driven campaigns, and to further expand on the multiplayer features.

== Expansion pack ==
Totally Games created an expansion pack called Balance of Power in response to criticism that the game didn't offer enough in single-player mode. Apart from new battles and missions, Balance of Power features a Rebel and an Imperial campaign of 15 missions each. The campaigns supported 8-player cooperative play. The parallel narratives of both campaigns revolve around the same series of events, and feature their own cutscenes, but with alternate endings.

- "Spreading the Rebellion" — Features the evacuation of a base, an attack against the Empire, and the capture of an Imperial Interdictor Cruiser. The campaign ends with an assault on the Super Star Destroyer Vengeance.
- "Imperial Task Force - Vengeance" — The player flies as a member of the elite Avenger squadron under the leadership of Admiral Senn. The missions are similar to those from the Rebel campaign. The campaign ends with the destruction of a Rebel factory.

The pack also adds B-wings as a pilot-able craft, along with other vessels that are lacking from the original game.

== Collectors edition ==
A cut-down limited version of X-Wing vs. TIE Fighter, called Flight School, was re-released as part of the X-Wing Collector Series compilation, which also contained special editions of the first two Star Wars space fighter games. In this edition, X-Wing and TIE Fighter were retrofitted with the X-Wing vs. TIE Fighter graphics engine, which uses texture mapping instead of Gouraud shading.

== Development ==
X-wing vs. TIE Fighter involved huge technical challenges to deliver a satisfactory multiplayer experience. In contrast with most popular multiplayer shooters such as Doom and Descent, it required far more data tracking and flow. This was due to the typical FPS taking place in a closed environment of rooms and corridors where players have little knowledge about other players' status or whereabouts unless they are looking directly at them. The deep space setting of X-wing vs. TIE Fighter, along with the conventions established in earlier titles, required information about all craft be available to all players all of the time.

Lead mission designer David Wessman took responsibility for the decision to avoid implementing a single-player storyline. "I am primarily to blame for the lack of story in [X-Wing vs. TIE Fighter] because I convinced myself and everyone else that we didn't really need it."

== Reception ==
The May 1997 issue of Edge gave X-wing vs. TIE Fighter 90 out of 100, stating, "LucasArts has finally listened to its legions of fans and developed a multiplayer version of its X-Wing and TIE Fighter games. But what's on offer for the PC owner without a network? Face facts. It's practically impossible for LucasArts to fail with a game like X-Wing vs. TIE Fighter. All the design team had to do was take the extremely successful X-Wing game, revamp the graphics (by adding Gouraud shading, texture mapping, dynamic lighting effects and so on), bolt on the critically lauded TIE Fighter (its visuals also suitably beefed up), and give slavering gameplayers the one thing that they've always wanted: a multiplayer option. Good as the original X-Wing and TIE Fighter were, they lacked the option to fly squadrons of Y-Wings and X-Wings against wings of TIE Fighters, bulbous TIE Bombers and Assault Gunboats in the ultimate interstellar deathmatch."

Next Generation gave X-wing vs. TIE Fighter 3 out of 5 stars, stating, "In the end, X-Wing vs. TIE Fighter is a good time, especially over a LAN with a bunch of friends, but it's not what it could have, and perhaps should have, been." Power Unlimited gave the game a score of 92% summarizing: "Super detailed, cool graphics, great sounds and difficult missions that will keep you busy for hours. Guaranteed fun!"

X-Wing vs. TIE Fighter sold 286,002 copies and became the 14th-best-selling computer game of 1997.

== Remake ==
In 2009, LucasArts and Transmission Games began work on a high-definition remake of X-Wing vs. TIE Fighter. Despite reportedly being "quite far down the track," the game was cancelled prior to its release.
