= Star Wars: Behind the Magic =

- Developer: LucasArts
- Publisher: LucasArts
- Platform: Windows
- Release: September 1998
- Genre: Multimedia
- Mode: Single-player

Star Wars: Behind the Magic is a 1998 multimedia CD-ROM from LucasArts.

== Summary ==
Behind the Magic is spread over two discs and includes video clips of the making of Star Wars: Episode I – The Phantom Menace. A wealth of imagery is presented through more than 2,500 photos, 600 pieces of production art, 30 models, 40 minutes of digitized video, 20 minutes of audio, and 30 ship schematics, plus a searchable database with more than 700 glossary terms.

== Development ==
Behind the Magic was shown by LucasArts behind closed doors at E3. Rumors circulated online that the title that would feature the first movie trailer for Star Wars: Episode One, but that was denied. It was compiled in one and a half years.

== Reception ==
Reception

Review scores
Publication	Score
All Game Guide	4.5/5
PC Gaming	92/100

The Daily Chronicle said "More than anything, Behind the Magic is the kind of CD-ROM you can get completely lost in, not just because of the content but because of the proverbial bells and whistles"

Romanian magazine PC Gaming gave Star Wars: Behind the Magic a score of 92 out of 100

Entertainment Weekly ranked Star Wars: Behind the Magic as the best CD-ROM of 1998. It was also a finalist at the DICE Award's for PC Family Title of the Year.
