= Star Wars: Rebel Assault =

1993 video game

- Developer: LucasArts
- Publisher: LucasArts
- Directors: Tony Van (original concept); Vince Lee
- Designer: Vince Lee
- Programmer: Vince Lee
- Artists: Ron Lussier; Aaron Muszalski
- Composers: Michael Land; Peter McConnell
- Series: Star Wars
- Platforms: MS-DOS, Sega CD, Classic Mac OS, 3DO
- Release: November 25, 1993
- Genres: Rail shooter, interactive movie
- Mode: Single-player

Star Wars: Rebel Assault is a rail shooter video game developed by LucasArts and published in 1993 for MS-DOS, Classic Mac OS, Sega CD, and 3DO. It is the first CD-ROM-only game to be published by LucasArts. Set in the Star Wars universe, the game follows a young pilot called Rookie One as they are trained by, and subsequently fight for, the Rebel Alliance in the Galactic Civil War.

The game uses digitized footage and music from the original movies (although most of the original footage is replaced by CGI rendered sequences) and full speech. It was followed by a sequel: Star Wars: Rebel Assault II: The Hidden Empire.

== Gameplay ==
Star Wars: Rebel Assault consists of four mission types: three spaceflight types, and one on foot. The three spaceflight mission types are third person (levels 1, 3, 5, 7, and 11), overhead view (levels 1 and 13), and first person (levels 2, 4, 5, 6, 8, 10, 12, 14, and 15). In all three types, the ship generally follows the same cursor which aims its gunfire. If the player moves the targeting cursor after firing, the shots that were already fired will follow the cursor. 9 of the 15 levels are first person, which has movement more restricted than in other modes. As such, enemy fire cannot be dodged in this mode; instead, the player must shoot the enemy within a set time frame in order to avoid taking damage, much like in a light gun game. Only level 9 falls into the on foot mission type. This level puts the player in a series of three stationary settings, though the player character can be maneuvered horizontally in order to avoid enemy fire. In a few stages, there are branching points, much like those in Panzer Dragoon II. Bonus points are awarded for accuracy and whether secondary objectives are accomplished.

In some cases, original footage was filmed for the game with actors, and a Star Destroyer model was digitized (a mini camera 'flew' around it) for a certain mission. Most of the graphics were prerendered in 3D.

== Story ==
Star Wars: Rebel Assault follows the adventures of a young Rebel pilot known as Rookie One. The game largely takes place during the events of Episode IV: A New Hope; however, the sequences on Hoth from The Empire Strikes Back are included.

The story begins with Rookie One's training, followed by an attack on the Star Destroyer Devastator, after its capture of the Tantive IV in the events of the film. The rebel squad then defends the Rebel base on Hoth from the attack shown in the Empire Strikes Back, and finally launches an assault on the Death Star, with the player taking the place of Luke Skywalker in destroying the battle station. Each of the 15 chapters features its own brief "alternate ending" clip which plays if the player runs out of lives and therefore fails the mission.

All of the original characters are replaced by new characters and voices, and in some cases, new situations. For example, Han Solo and the Millennium Falcon are replaced by Rebel Commander Jake Farrell in an A-wing who saves Rookie One just before he has to take the final shot on the Death Star.

The game was followed by Star Wars: Rebel Assault II: The Hidden Empire.

== Version differences ==
The Sega CD version is missing Chapter 7 (Imperial Probe Droids) and skips straight to Chapter 8 (Imperial Walkers), renumbering all subsequent chapters accordingly. The Sega CD version's graphics are also considerably less sharp and detailed than those of the PC and 3DO versions, and it also lacks the possibility to play as a female Rookie One.

== Reception and sales ==
Reception

Review scores
Publication	Score
AllGame	3.5/5 (Sega CD)
Edge	5/10 (PC)
Game Players	72% (Sega CD)
Hyper	90%
Next Generation	2/5 (3DO, MAC)
MacUser	3/5

Star Wars: Rebel Assault was a commercial hit. LucasArts shipped 110,000 units to retailers in the game's first day, and global sales reached 400,000 units by mid-1994. By summer 1994, this number rose to 500,000 units. The game sold 1 million copies.

For Jeff Lundrigan of Game Players, the Sega CD version was a "decent-enough" product that was a great showcase of the console's capabilities, but also one of the most disappointing games of 1994.

Computer Gaming World in February 1994 said of the DOS version that "In some ways, Rebel Assault is a breathtaking game, yet it comes up a few light sabers short in some key areas". While praising the graphics as "the best yet delivered in a PC action game", the reviewer complained that the story "essentially replays several scenes from the movie" even though the plot "required a knowledge of the movies to make sense of it". Gameplay was "an odd mix of challenging and mindless levels", with enemies attacking in the same easily memorizable patterns. The magazine concluded that "Rebel Assault is a gorgeous, fast-paced shooter that is a lot of fun to play. The problem is, the fun is too short lived" and without replay value. In April 1994 the magazine said that Rebel Assault "seems to have split gamers into two camps—those that absolutely love it, and those that absolutely don't", with some criticizing the "very limited and very repetitive" game play despite "incredible" graphics. The magazine concluded "Come to this one expecting a good show, but be sure your trigger finger knows what your eyes and ears are getting it into".

GamePro gave the Sega CD version a negative review. Though they praised the music, they described the graphics as "grainy, soupy, and very pixelated" and said that the controls are poor enough to all but eliminate the fun factor in the game. Electronic Gaming Monthly scored it a 5.75 out of 10, commenting that the music is excellent but that the graphics suffer from an extremely limited color palette, which even interferes with the gameplay, making it difficult to tell when the player's ship is going to crash into something.

For the 3DO version of the game, GamePro gave a somewhat more positive review, praising the audio and the "awesome graphics", but once again concluded that the controls all but completely ruin the game. They remarked that the directional movements are twitchy and that the need to push the cursor to the edge of the screen in order to maneuver the ship in first person is a major problem. A reviewer for Next Generation likewise said that the graphics and music are impressive, and the port is overall "a very close conversion of the PC CD-ROM game", but that "the control is none too solid, and game play is rudimentary." He gave it two out of five stars.

Next Generation's review of the Macintosh version remarked that the game's recreation of vehicles and scenarios from the Star Wars universe would make it very appealing to fans of the franchise, but that the on-rails gameplay would get old quickly for general gamers. The review also commented on the usual long delay between the release of the PC and Macintosh versions, and scored it two out of five stars.

Rebel Assault was a runner-up for Computer Gaming World's Action Game of the Year award in June 1994, losing to Prince of Persia 2: The Shadow and the Flame. The editors wrote that Rebel Assault "established a new record for CD-ROM game sales as well as a new model for action games based on film properties".

MacUser named Rebel Assault one of the top 50 CD-ROMs of 1995.

Entertainment Weekly gave the game a B and wrote that "You've got to hand it to the folks at LucasArts — they wring every drop of juice from a game platform, whether it's PC CD-ROM (where Rebel Assault has been a best-seller for the past eight months) or Sega CD (which is just releasing the same game). The trouble is, Sega CD doesn't have that much juice to begin with: Thanks to the system's slow disc access and limited color capabilities, this version of the Star Wars fighter ship never quite reaches light speed."

James V. Trunzo reviewed Star Wars: Rebel Assault in White Wolf #42 (April, 1994), giving it a final evaluation of "Very Good" and stated that "If you're looking for a Wing Commander/X-Wing type product, Rebel Assault isn't it. If you're looking for an exciting, quick-playing multimedia experience, you'll love Rebel; Assault."
