= Blue Wizard Is About To Die! =

2003 book by Seth Flynn Barkan

- The cover of the first edition
- Author: Seth "Fingers" Flynn Barkan
- Illustrator: Warren Wucinich
- Cover artist: Warren Wucinich
- Language: English
- Subject: Video and computer games
- Genre: Poetry
- Publisher: Rusty Immelman Press
- Publication date: 2004
- Publication place: US
- Media type: Softcover book
- Pages: 144
- ISBN: 0-9741000-0-5
- OCLC: 54846385

Blue Wizard Is About To Die!: Prose, Poems, and Emoto-Versatronic Expressionist Pieces About Video Games (1980–2003) is a volume of verse written by Seth Flynn Barkan in 2003; the title is a phrase heard in the arcade game Gauntlet II. It is reputedly the first volume of poetry dedicated to computer and video games. In part because of its uniqueness and because of reviews in a number of periodicals both in and out of the gaming world, Blue Wizard Is About To Die! "sold more than 5,000 copies internationally, making it one of the best-selling poetry collections of 2004."

The content (an introduction, 47 poems, 5 appendices, and the text of All Your Base) focuses primarily on classic arcade games such as Sinistar, Dragon's Lair, or Joust, but it also ranges up in time to more recent games such as Half-Life, Crazy Taxi, and Bushido Blade. The poems are largely irregular free verse, although for his Mega Man (character)-related poems Barkan uses an eccentric form of haiku The poems are themselves varied in content; "Mario in Exile" reimagines Mario as a Stalinesque dictator and recontextualizes his games as grand military campaigns to take over countries, while other accounts segue between the in-world reality and backstories, the heart-felt motivations of characters, such as in Bushido Blade, and the callous indifference or anger the players feel as they battle each other; others, like "Doom" reflect on the sad life of characters like the hapless Marine in the titular Doom, or are the internal accounts of characters like Gordon Freeman as they are plunged into hellish situations such as in Half-Life. A number of poems are ostensibly autobiographical in nature, the author as a child or teenager playing games and his reflections on them.

== See also ==
- Lucky Wander Boy
