= Star Wars =

American media franchise

- Created by: George Lucas
- Original work: Star Wars (1977) (Note: The film's release was preceded by its novelization in 1976.)
- Owner: Lucasfilm
- Years: 1977–present

Print publications
- Books: List of reference books
- Novels: List of novels
- Comics: List of comics
- Magazines: Star Wars Insider (1987–2026)

Films and television
- Films: List of films
- Television series: List of television series

Games
- Role-playing: List of RPGs
- Video games: List of video games

Audio
- Radio programs: List of radio dramas
- Original music: Music

Miscellaneous
- Toy: Merchandise
- Theme park attractions: List of attractions

Star Wars is an American media franchise created by George Lucas. The space opera saga began with the original Star Wars film (1977) and quickly became a worldwide pop culture phenomenon. It has expanded into various films and other media, including television series, video games, novels, comic books, theme park attractions, and themed areas, comprising an all-encompassing fictional universe. (Note: Most existing spin-off media was made non-canon and rebranded as 'Legends' in April 2014.) Star Wars is one of the highest-grossing media franchises of all time and has a large following.

The original film, later retitled Episode IV: A New Hope, was followed by the sequels Episode V: The Empire Strikes Back (1980) and Episode VI: Return of the Jedi (1983), forming the original Star Wars trilogy. Lucas later returned to the series to write and direct a prequel trilogy, consisting of Episode I: The Phantom Menace (1999), Episode II: Attack of the Clones (2002), and Episode III: Revenge of the Sith (2005).

In 2012, Lucas sold his production company to Disney, relinquishing his ownership of the franchise. This led to a sequel trilogy, consisting of Episode VII: The Force Awakens (2015), Episode VIII: The Last Jedi (2017), and Episode IX: The Rise of Skywalker (2019).

All nine films, collectively referred to as the "Skywalker Saga", were nominated for Academy Awards, with Oscars going to the first three releases. Together with the spin-off films Rogue One (2016), Solo (2018) and The Mandalorian and Grogu (2026), the combined box office revenue of Star Wars theatrical live-action films equals over US$10 billion, making Star Wars the third-highest-grossing film franchise in cinematic history.

== Premise ==
Star Wars stories are set in a fictional galaxy in the distant past. They span multiple fictional eras, in which humans and many species of aliens (often humanoid) co-exist with droids (robots), which may be programmed for personal assistance or battle. Space travel between planets is common due to lightspeed hyperspace technology. The various planets depicted contain a range of societies, from wealthy, planet-wide cities to deserts scarcely populated by primitive tribes. Virtually any Earth biome, along with many fictional ones, has its counterpart as a Star Wars planet which, in most cases, teem with sentient and non-sentient alien life. The franchise also makes use of other astronomical objects such as asteroid fields and nebulae. Spacecraft range from small starfighters to large capital ships, such as the Star Destroyers, as well as space stations such as the moon-sized Death Stars. Telecommunication includes two-way audio and audiovisual screens, holographic projections, and hyperspace transmission.

The universe of Star Wars is generally similar to the real universe but its laws of physics are less strict allowing for more imaginative stories. One aspect of that is a mystical power known as the Force which is described in the original film as "an energy field created by all living things ... [that] binds the galaxy together". The field is depicted as a kind of pantheistic god. Through training and meditation, those whom "the Force is strong with" exhibit various superpowers (such as telekinesis, precognition, telepathy, and manipulation of physical energy); it is believed nothing is impossible for the Force. These superpowers are wielded by two major knightly orders at conflict with each other: the Jedi, peacekeepers of the Galactic Republic who act on the light side of the Force through non-attachment and arbitration, and the Sith, who use the dark side by manipulating anger, fear and aggression. While Jedi Knights can be numerous, the Dark Lords of the Sith (or 'Sith Lords') are intended to be limited to two: a master and their apprentice.

The franchise is set against a backdrop of galactic conflict involving rebellions, republics and empires, such as the evil Galactic Empire. The Jedi and Sith prefer the use of a weapon called the lightsaber, a retractable blade of plasma that can cut through virtually any surface and deflect energy bolts. The rest of the population, as well as renegades and soldiers, use plasma-powered blaster firearms. In the outer reaches of the galaxy, crime syndicates such as the Hutt cartel are dominant. Bounty hunters are often employed by both gangsters and governments, while illicit activities include smuggling and slavery.

While the franchise is best known as an archetypal space opera, the combination of science fiction and fantasy elements makes Star Wars very universal, capable of telling stories of various genres.

== Films ==
=== The Skywalker Saga ===
Film	U.S. release date	Directed by	Screenplay by	Story by	Produced by	Refs.
Original trilogy: Episodes IV–VI
A New Hope	May 25, 1977	George Lucas	George Lucas	George Lucas	Gary Kurtz	
The Empire Strikes Back	May 21, 1980	Irvin Kershner	Leigh Brackett and Lawrence Kasdan	George Lucas	Gary Kurtz	
Return of the Jedi	May 25, 1983	Richard Marquand	Lawrence Kasdan and George Lucas	George Lucas	Howard Kazanjian	
Prequel trilogy: Episodes I–III
The Phantom Menace	May 19, 1999	George Lucas	George Lucas	George Lucas	Rick McCallum	
Attack of the Clones	May 16, 2002	George Lucas	George Lucas and Jonathan Hales	George Lucas	Rick McCallum	
Revenge of the Sith	May 19, 2005	George Lucas	George Lucas	George Lucas	Rick McCallum	
Sequel trilogy: Episodes VII–IX
The Force Awakens	December 18, 2015	J. J. Abrams	Lawrence Kasdan & J. J. Abrams and Michael Arndt	Lawrence Kasdan & J. J. Abrams and Michael Arndt	Kathleen Kennedy, J.J. Abrams and Bryan Burk	
The Last Jedi	December 15, 2017	Rian Johnson	Rian Johnson	Rian Johnson	Kathleen Kennedy and Ram Bergman	
The Rise of Skywalker	December 20, 2019	J. J. Abrams	Chris Terrio & J. J. Abrams	Derek Connolly & Colin Trevorrow and J.J. Abrams & Chris Terrio	Kathleen Kennedy, J. J. Abrams and Michelle Rejwan	

The Star Wars film series centers on three sets of trilogies, the nine films of which are collectively referred to as the "Skywalker Saga". The saga was produced non-chronologically, beginning with the original trilogy between 1977 and 1983. This was followed by the prequel trilogy, released between 1999 and 2005, and the sequel trilogy, released between 2015 and 2019.

Each trilogy focuses on a generation of the Force-sensitive Skywalker family and their struggle against the Sith lord Palpatine (also known as Darth Sidious). The original trilogy depicts the development of Luke Skywalker as a Jedi and his fight against Palpatine's Galactic Empire alongside his sister, Leia. The prequels tell the backstory of their father, Anakin, who is seduced to the dark side by Palpatine and becomes Darth Vader. The sequels follow the conflict between Leia's son, Ben Solo, and Luke and Leia's protegé, Rey, and their eventual alliance against Palpatine after the fall of the Empire.

==== Original trilogy ====
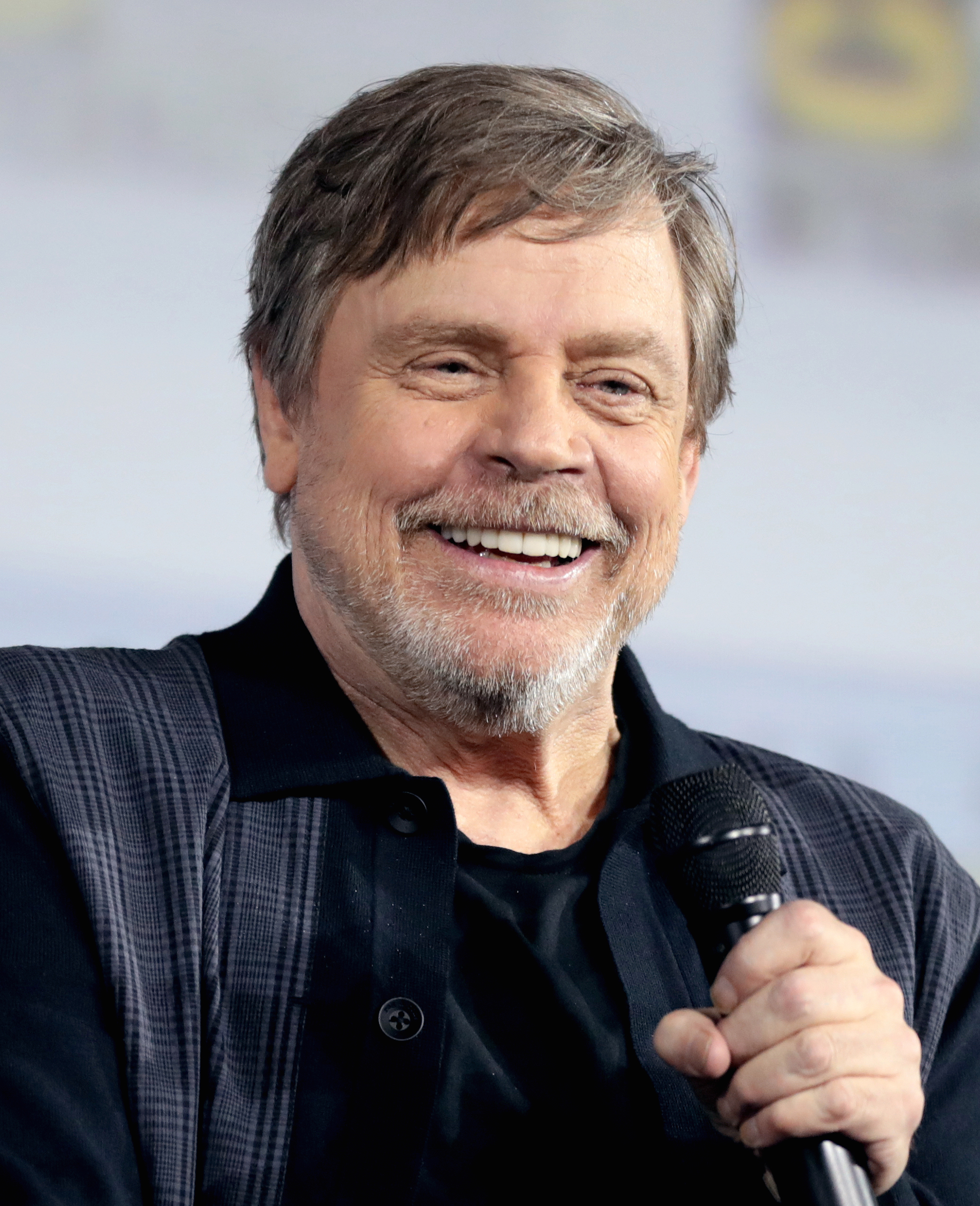
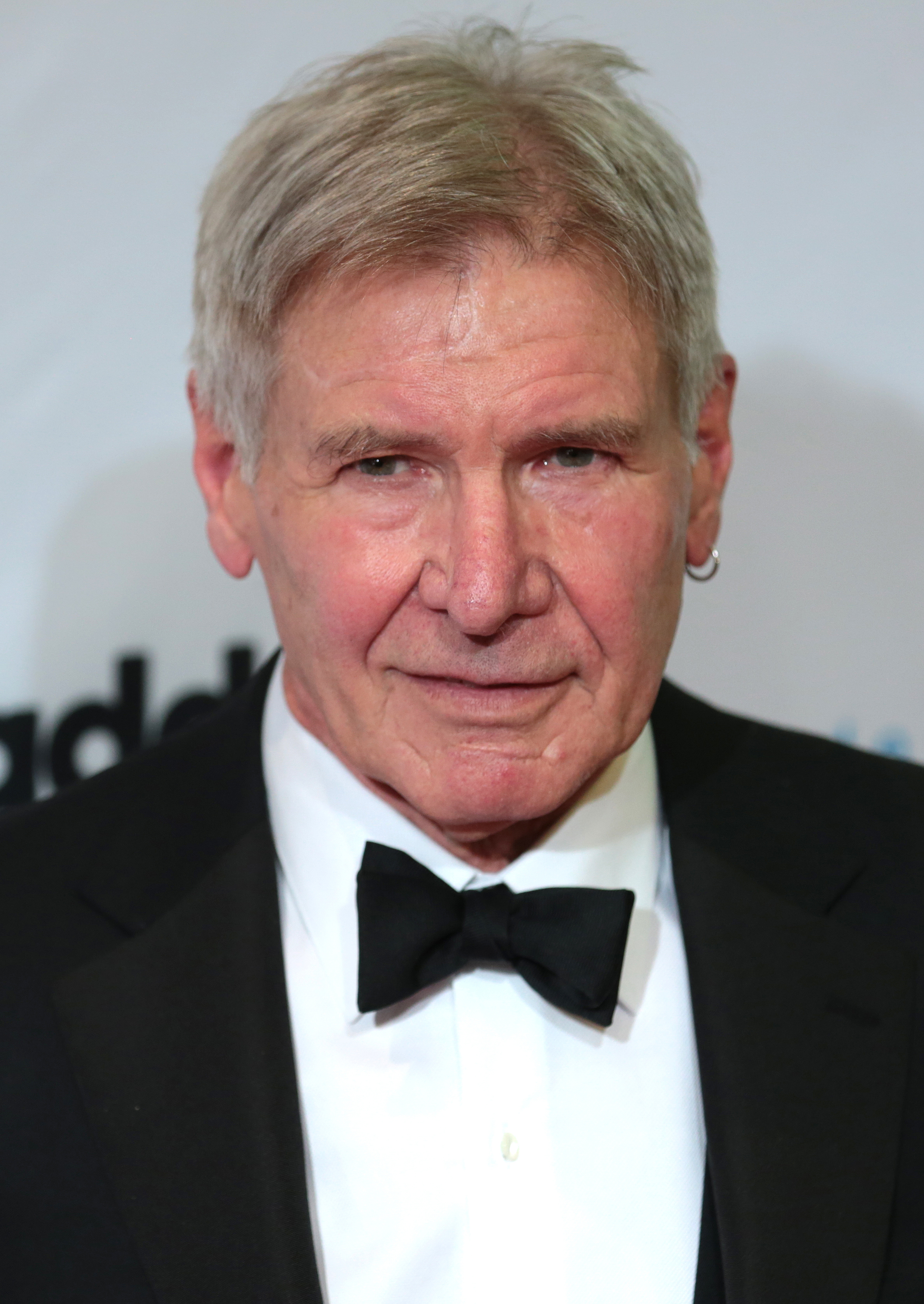
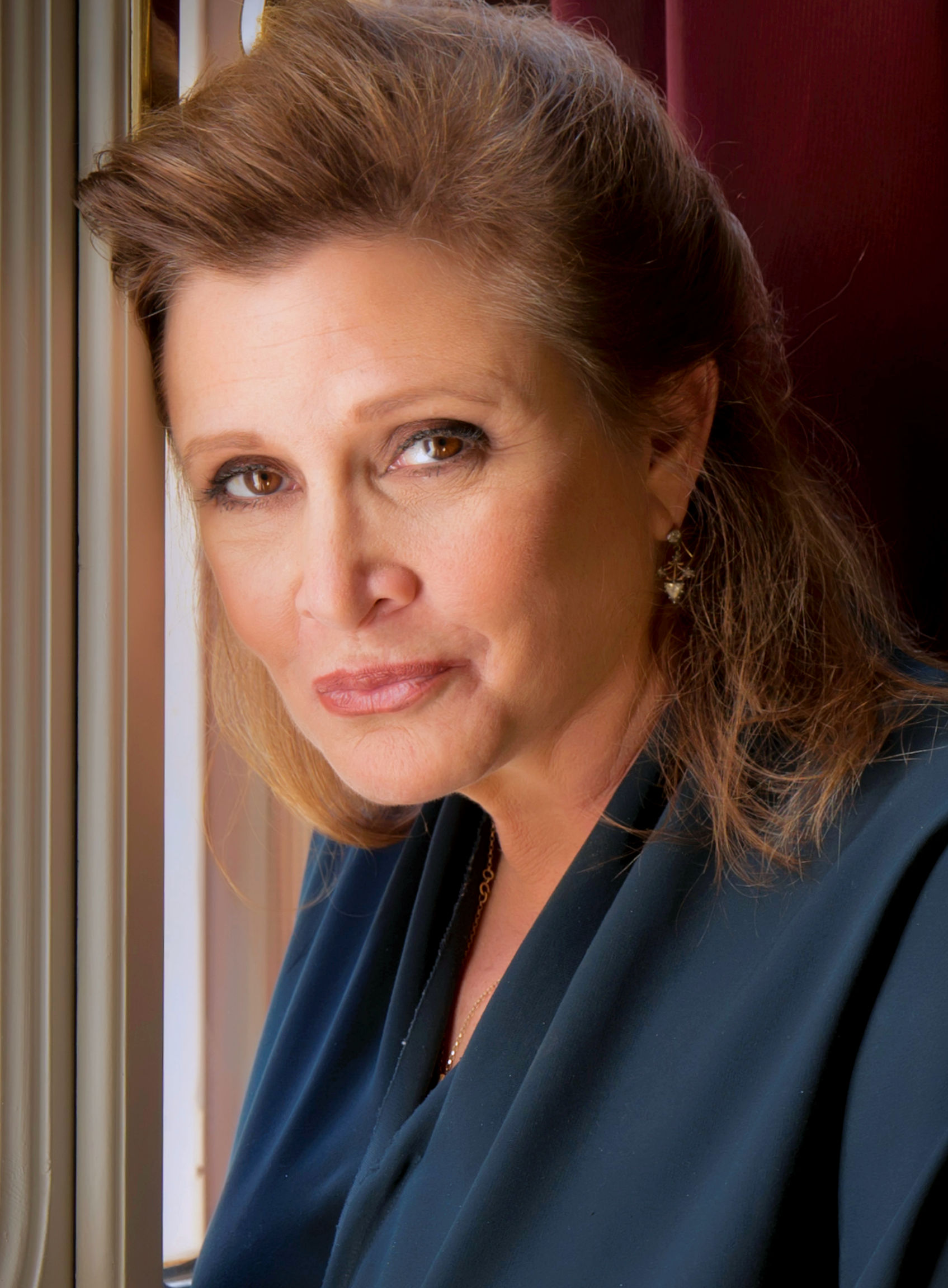
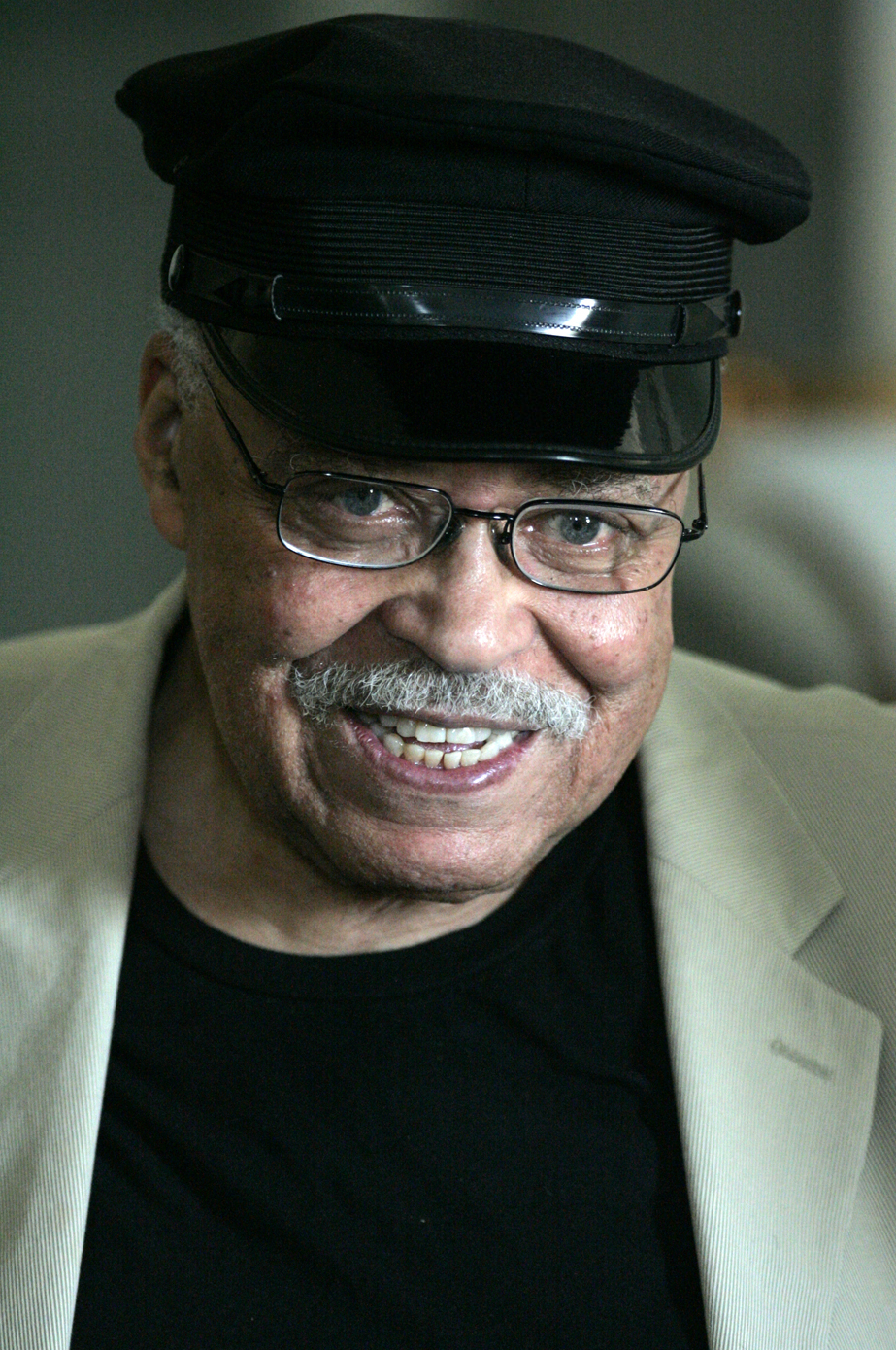
The cast of the original trilogy includes, from left to right, Mark Hamill (Luke Skywalker), Harrison Ford (Han Solo), Carrie Fisher (Princess Leia), and James Earl Jones (Darth Vader's voice).

In 1971, George Lucas wanted to film an adaptation of the Flash Gordon serial, but could not obtain the rights, so he began developing his own space opera. (Note: Lucas started by researching the inspiration behind Alex Raymond's Flash Gordon comic, leading him to the works of author Edgar Rice Burroughs—in particular, the John Carter of Mars series.) After directing American Graffiti (1973), he wrote a two-page synopsis, which 20th Century Fox decided to finance. By 1974, he had expanded the story into the first draft of a screenplay. Fox expected the film would be of limited financial success, and so it was given a relatively low budget, with production moved to Elstree Studios in England to lower costs.

Star Wars was released on May 25, 1977, and was first subtitled Episode IV: A New Hope in the 1979 book The Art of Star Wars. The film's success led Lucas to make it the basis of an elaborate film serial. With the backstory he created for the sequel, Lucas decided that the series would be a trilogy of trilogies. Episode V: The Empire Strikes Back was released on May 21, 1980, also achieving wide financial and critical success. The final film in the trilogy, Episode VI: Return of the Jedi, was released on May 25, 1983.

==== Prequel trilogy ====
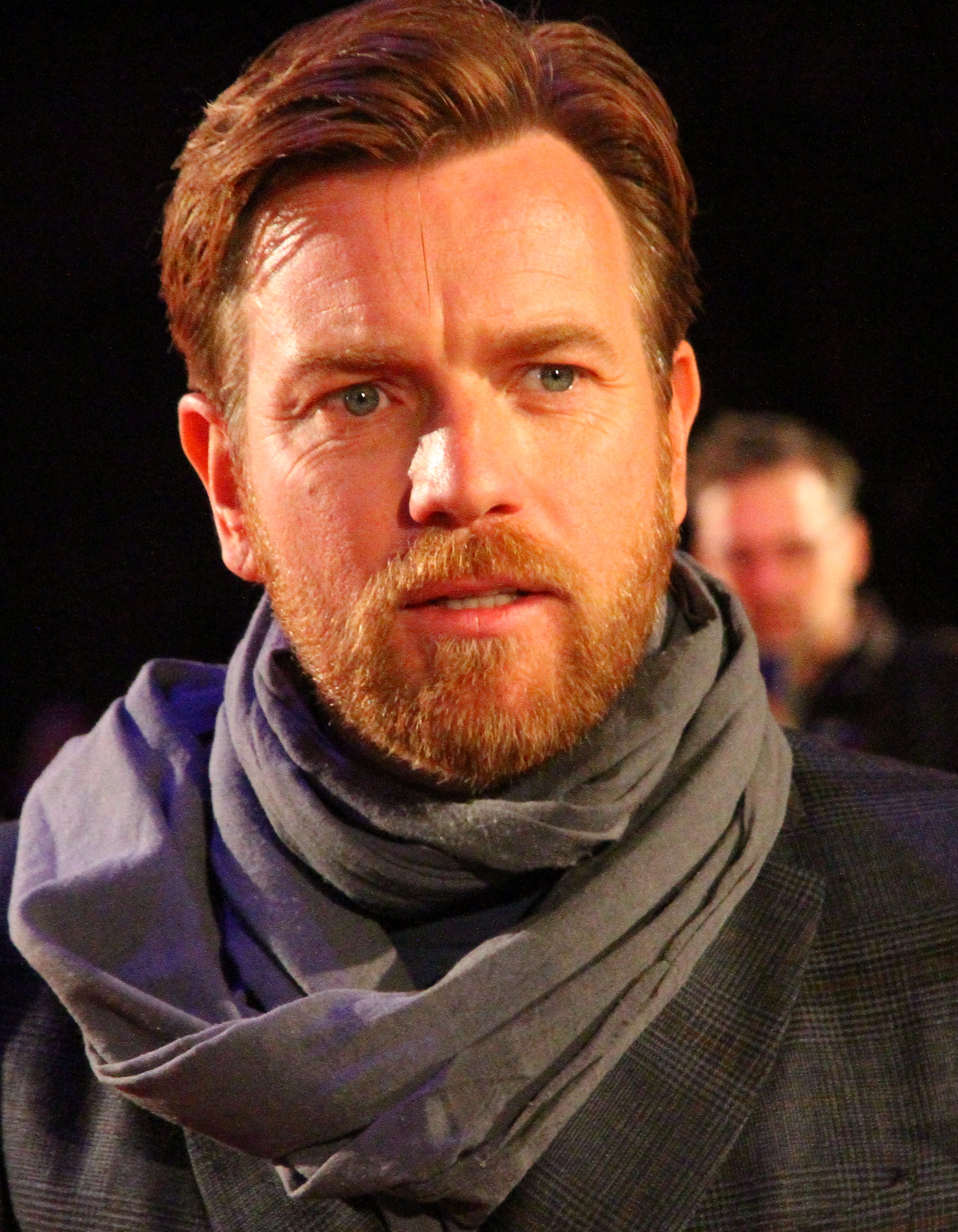
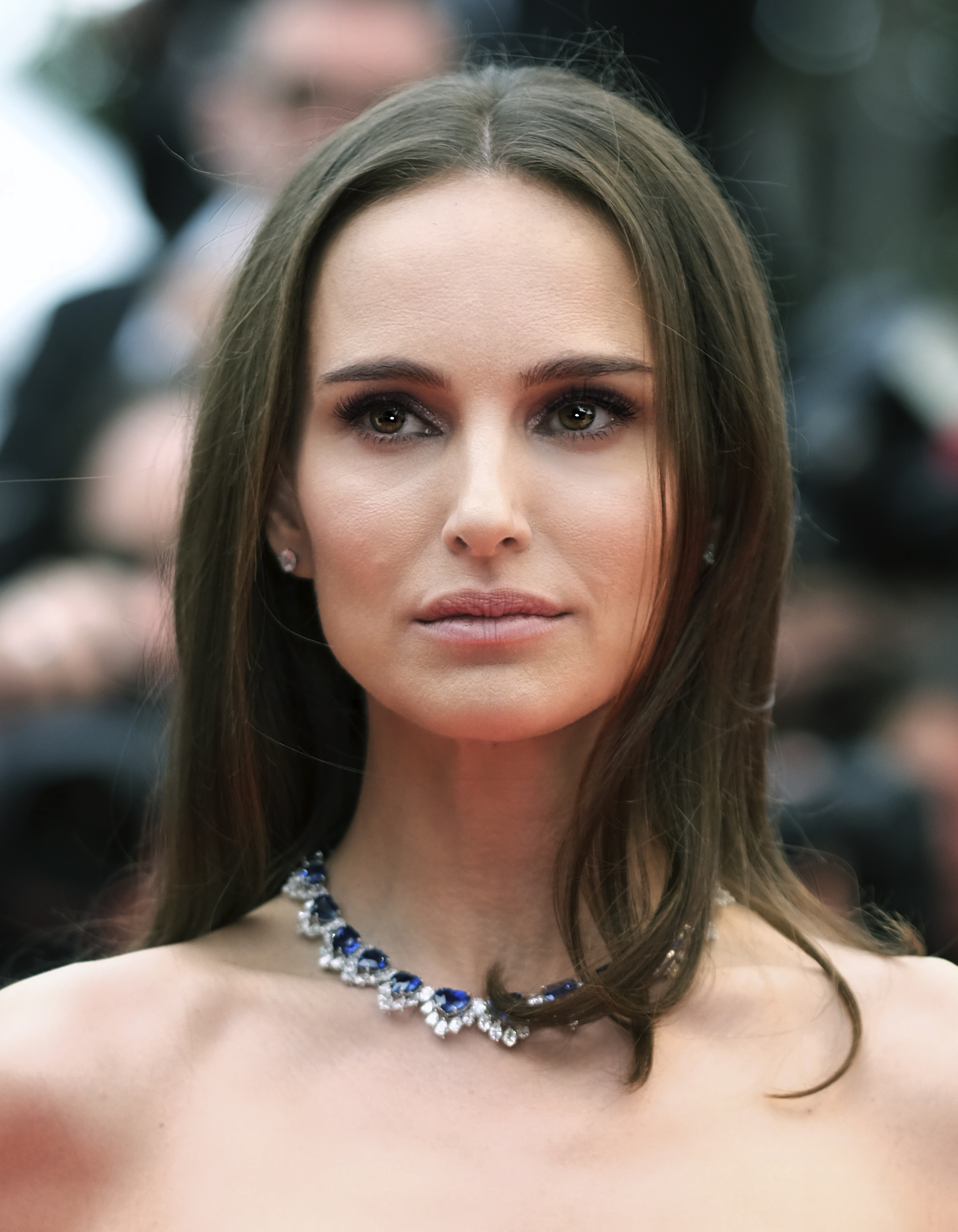
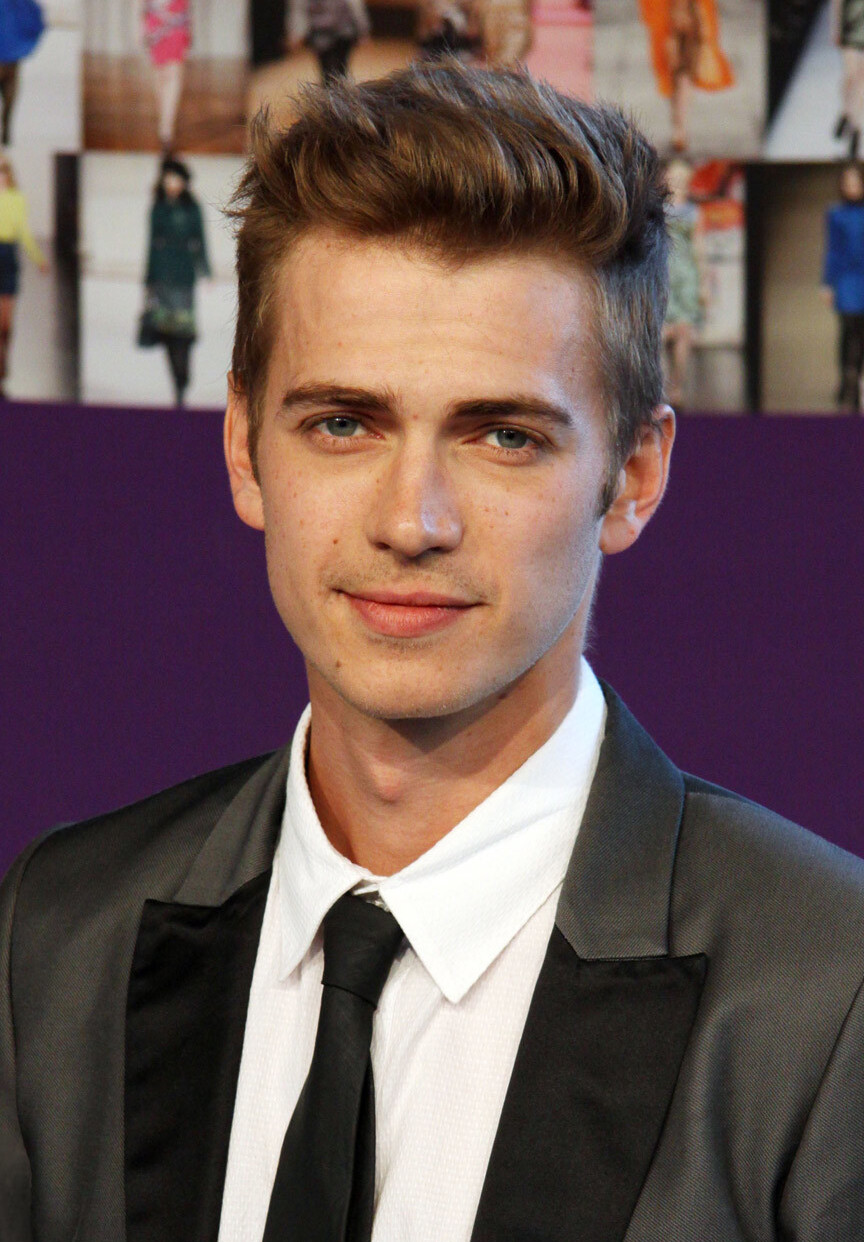
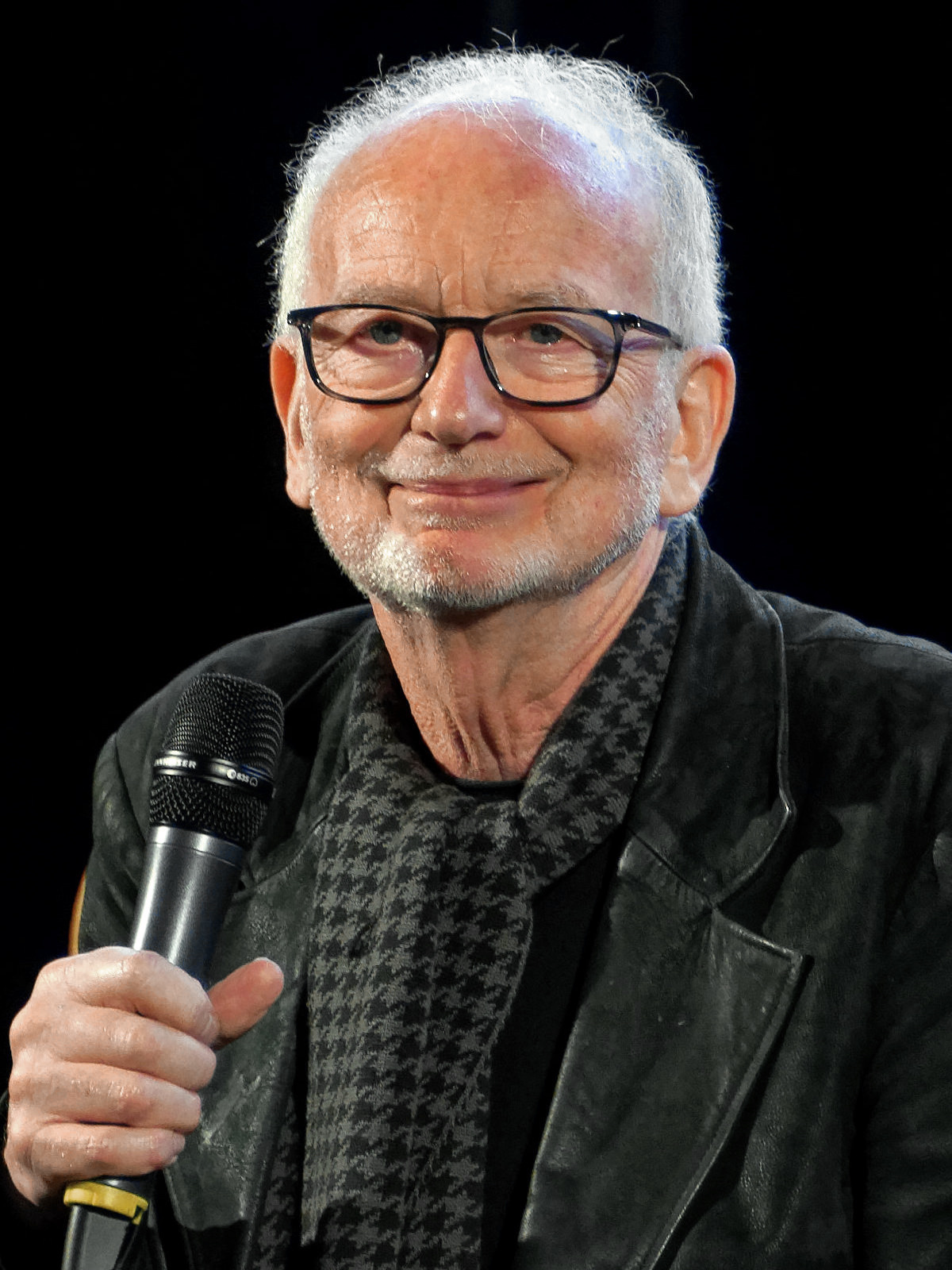
The cast of the prequel trilogy includes, from left to right, Ewan McGregor (Obi-Wan Kenobi), Natalie Portman (Padmé Amidala), Hayden Christensen (Anakin Skywalker), and Ian McDiarmid (Palpatine).

According to producer Gary Kurtz, loose plans for a prequel trilogy were developed during the outlining of the original two films. In 1980, Lucas confirmed that he had the nine-film series plotted, but due to the stress of producing the original trilogy, he had decided to cancel further sequels by 1981. In 1983, Lucas explained that "There was never a script completed that had the entire story as it exists now ... As the stories unfolded, I would take certain ideas and save them ... I kept taking out all the good parts, and I just kept telling myself I would make other movies someday."

Technical advances in the late 1980s and early 1990s, including the ability to create computer-generated imagery (CGI), inspired Lucas to consider that it might be possible to revisit his saga. In 1989, Lucas stated that the prequels would be "unbelievably expensive". In 1992, he acknowledged that he had plans to create the prequel trilogy. A theatrical rerelease of the original trilogy in 1997 "updated" the 20-year-old films with the style of CGI envisioned for the new trilogy.

Episode I: The Phantom Menace was released on May 19, 1999, Episode II: Attack of the Clones on May 16, 2002, and Episode III: Revenge of the Sith on May 19, 2005. The first two films were met with mixed reviews, with the third being received more positively. Together with the original trilogy, Lucas has referred to the first six episodic films of the franchise as "the tragedy of Darth Vader".

==== Sequel trilogy ====
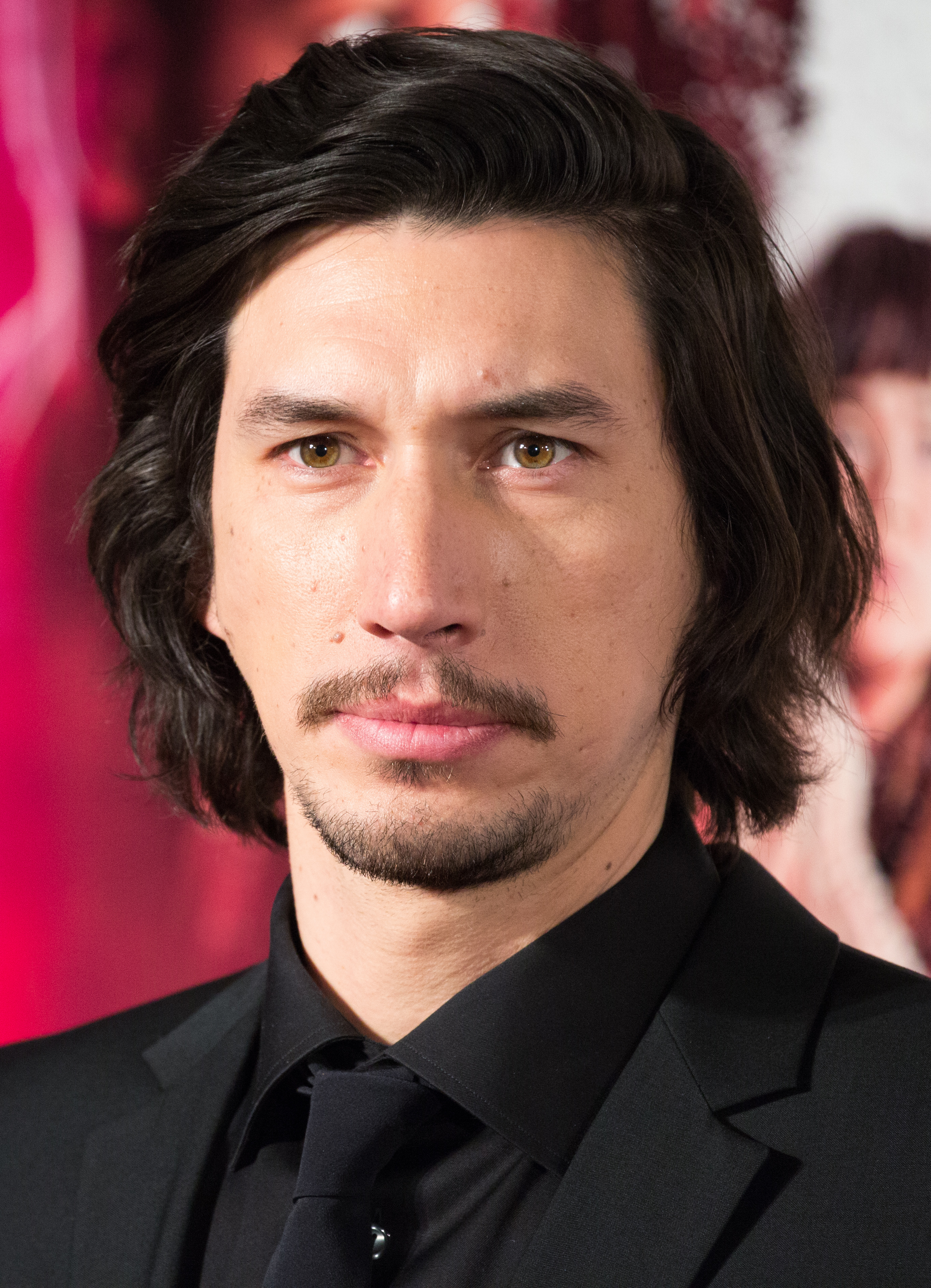
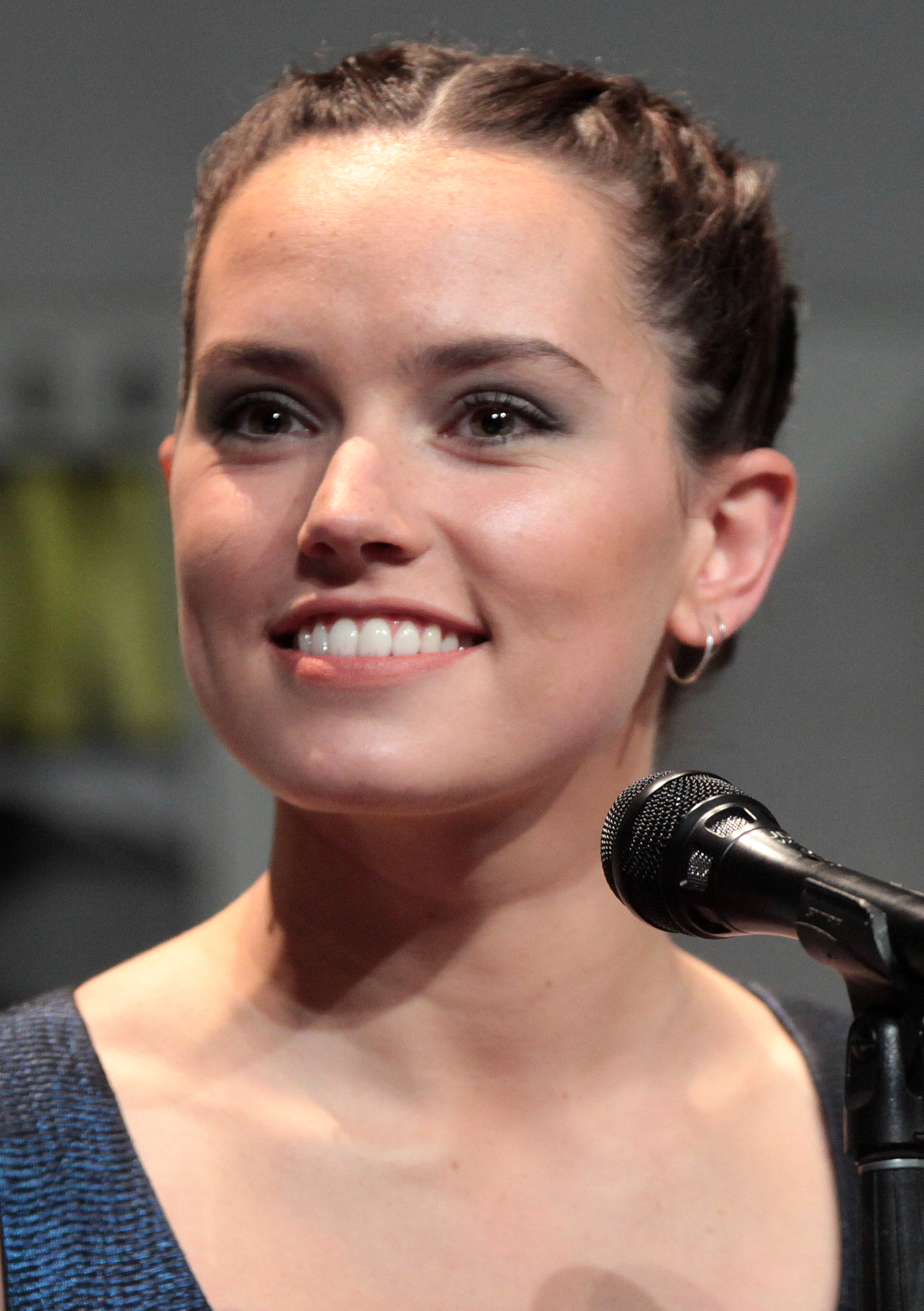
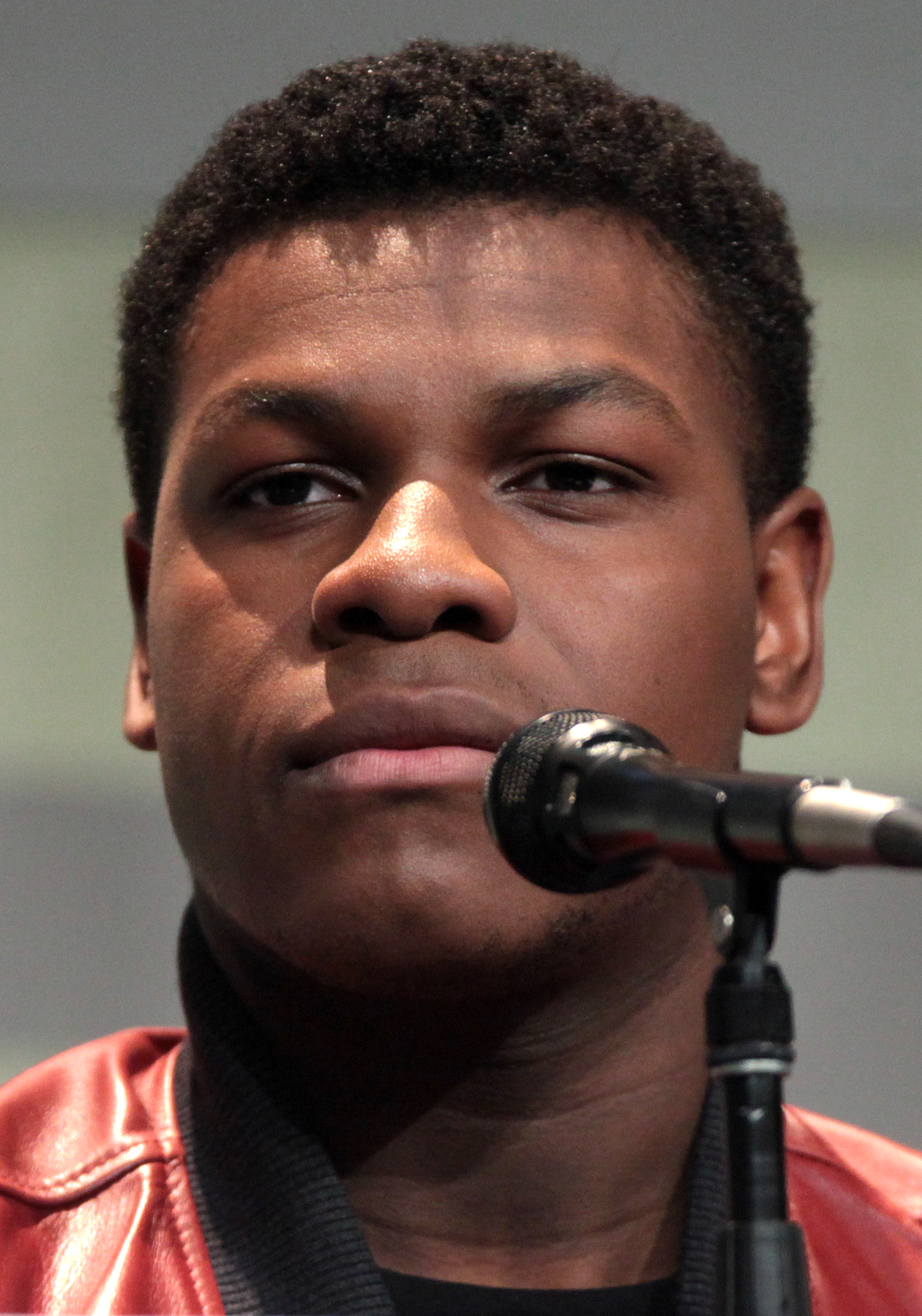
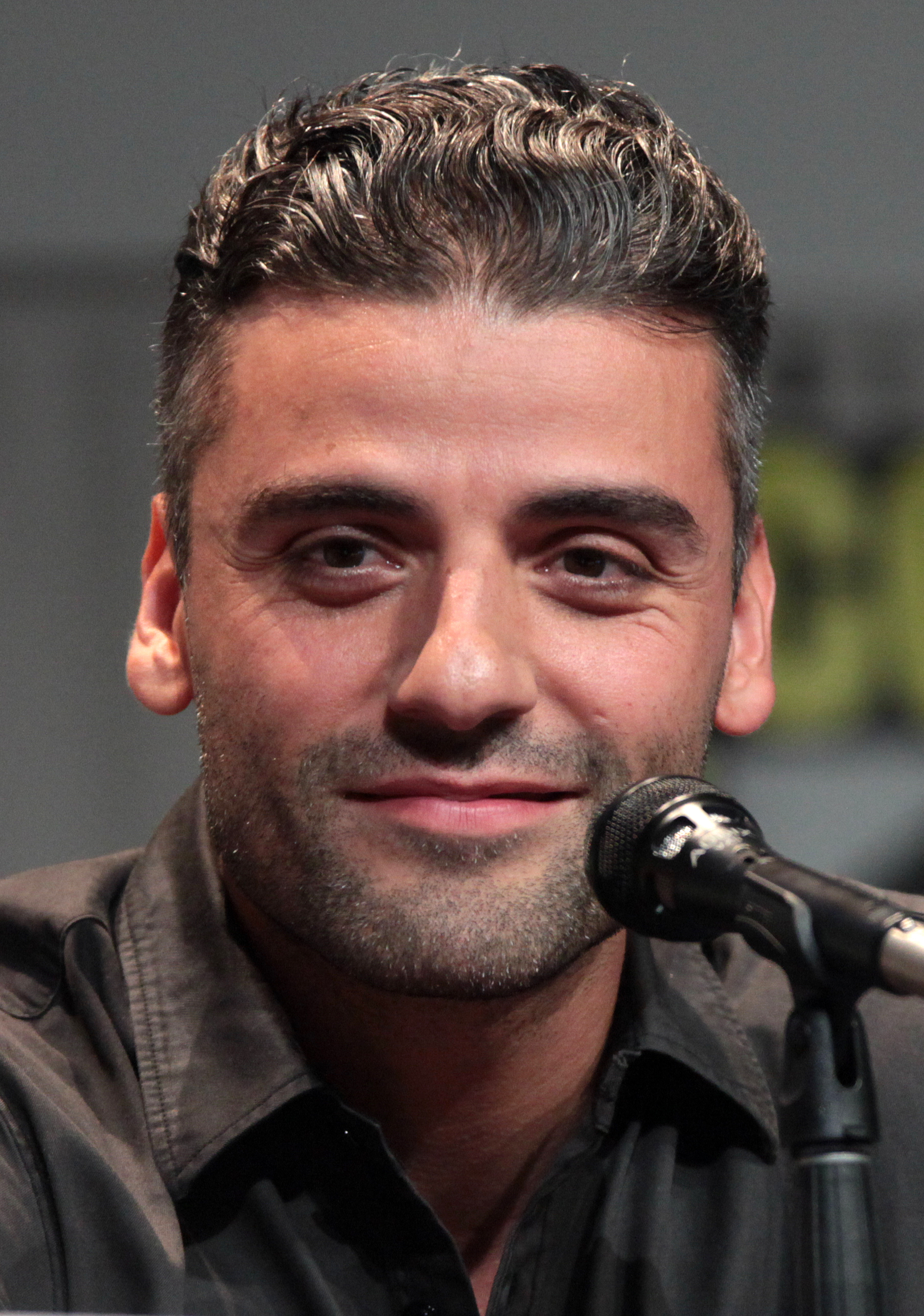
The cast of the sequel trilogy includes, from left to right, Adam Driver (Kylo Ren), Daisy Ridley (Rey), John Boyega (Finn), and Oscar Isaac (Poe Dameron).

Prior to releasing the original 1977 film, and made possible by its success, Lucas planned "three trilogies of nine films". However, he announced to Time in 1978 that he planned "10 sequels". He confirmed that he had outlined the prequels and sequels in 1981. At various stages of development, the sequel trilogy was to focus on the rebuilding of the Republic, the return of Luke as a Jedi Master (a role similar to that of Obi-Wan Kenobi in the original trilogy), Luke's sister (not yet determined to be Leia), Han, Leia, R2-D2 and C-3PO. However, after beginning work on the prequel trilogy, Lucas insisted that Star Wars was meant to be a six-part series and that there would be no sequel trilogy.

Lucas decided to leave the franchise in the hands of other filmmakers, announcing in January 2012 that he would make no more Star Wars films. That October, the Walt Disney Company agreed to buy Lucasfilm and announced that Episode VII would be released in 2015. The co-chairman of Lucasfilm, Kathleen Kennedy, became president and served as executive producer of new Star Wars feature films. Lucas provided Kennedy his story treatments for the sequels during the 2012 sale, but in 2015 it was revealed Lucas's sequel outline had been discarded. The sequel trilogy also meant the end of the Star Wars Expanded Universe stories, which were discarded from canon to give "maximum creative freedom to the filmmakers and also preserve an element of surprise and discovery for the audience."

Episode VII: The Force Awakens was released on December 18, 2015, Episode VIII: The Last Jedi on December 15, 2017, and Episode IX: The Rise of Skywalker on December 20, 2019, in many countries. (Note: Each film was released two days later in the U.S.) The Force Awakens and The Last Jedi were both critical and box office successes. Episode IX received a mixed reception from critics and audiences.

=== Standalone films ===
Film	U.S. release date	Directed by	Screenplay by	Story by	Produced by	Refs.
Star Wars: The Clone Wars	August 15, 2008	Dave Filoni	Henry Gilroy, Steven Melching & Scott Murphy	Henry Gilroy, Steven Melching & Scott Murphy	Catherine Winder	
Rogue One: A Star Wars Story	December 16, 2016	Gareth Edwards	Chris Weitz and Tony Gilroy	John Knoll and Gary Whitta	Kathleen Kennedy, Allison Shearmur and Simon Emanuel	
Solo: A Star Wars Story	May 25, 2018	Ron Howard	Jonathan Kasdan & Lawrence Kasdan	Jonathan Kasdan & Lawrence Kasdan	Kathleen Kennedy, Allison Shearmur and Simon Emanuel	
The Mandalorian and Grogu	May 22, 2026	Jon Favreau	Jon Favreau & Dave Filoni & Noah Kloor	Jon Favreau & Dave Filoni & Noah Kloor	Jon Favreau, Dave Filoni, Kathleen Kennedy and Ian Bryce	

Several Star Wars films have been produced separately from the Skywalker Saga. In 2008, Lucasfilm released the animated film The Clone Wars, which is set during the time period of the prequel trilogy and serves as the theatrical pilot of the television series The Clone Wars. Following Disney's acquisition of Lucasfilm in 2012, an "anthology" film series set between the main episodes of the Skywalker Saga entered development in parallel with the production of the sequel trilogy, described by Disney chief financial officer Jay Rasulo as origin stories.

The first film released was 2016's Rogue One, which tells the story of the rebels who steal the plans for the Death Star, the Galactic Empire's superweapon, just before the events of the original Star Wars film. A second film, 2018's Solo, tells Han Solo's backstory, set 10 years prior to A New Hope. The series Obi-Wan Kenobi was originally planned as a film, but was changed to a miniseries due to Solo's underperformance at the box office.

In January 2024, it was announced that Jon Favreau would direct a new Star Wars film, titled The Mandalorian & Grogu. In February of the same year, Bob Iger announced that the film would be the first release of the next slate of Star Wars movies. The Mandalorian & Grogu released on May 22, 2026.

=== Upcoming films ===
Film	U.S. release date	Directed by	Screenplay by	Produced by	Status	Refs.
Star Wars: Starfighter	May 28, 2027	Shawn Levy	Jonathan Tropper	Kathleen Kennedy and Shawn Levy	Post-production	
Untitled New Jedi Order film	TBA	Sharmeen Obaid-Chinoy	George Nolfi	Kathleen Kennedy	Pre-production	
Untitled Dawn of the Jedi film	TBA	James Mangold	James Mangold and Beau Willimon	Kathleen Kennedy	In development	
Untitled New Republic film	TBA	Dave Filoni	Dave Filoni	Kathleen Kennedy and Jon Favreau	In development	

In April 2023, three new untitled Star Wars films were announced, each taking place in different eras of the franchise's fictional universe. James Mangold will write and direct a film set during the early years of the Jedi, while Dave Filoni will direct a film set between the original and sequel trilogies during the New Republic era. Filoni's movie will serve as the climax of the various live-action television series that began with The Mandalorian in 2019. Sharmeen Obaid-Chinoy will direct a third film about a new Jedi Order, set fifteen years after the sequel trilogy. In January 2025, George Nolfi was hired to write the script for the Obaid-Chinoy film.

In November 2022, Shawn Levy entered talks to direct a Star Wars film, following his work on Deadpool & Wolverine (2024) and the fifth and final season of Stranger Things. In September 2023, Levy said that development on his Star Wars film began, but would not continue until after the conclusion of the 2023 Writers Guild of America strike. In April 2025, Ryan Gosling was cast in the film, the title was officially revealed as Star Wars: Starfighter, and the film received the release date of May 28, 2027. In June 2025, Mia Goth joined the cast.

==== Other announced projects ====
Lucasfilm has a number of Star Wars films in various stages of development, including:

- Untitled Rian Johnson trilogy: In November 2017, a trilogy of movies written by The Last Jedi writer/director Rian Johnson was announced to be in development. In April 2023, Kennedy stated that trilogy of films is still in open development at the studio, with the writer/director working on the story, although it is not currently a priority. By July 2025, Johnson admitted that "nothing really happened with it".
- Untitled David Benioff and D. B. Weiss trilogy: In February 2018, it was announced that David Benioff and D. B. Weiss would serve as writers and producers on a trilogy of new Star Wars movies. The plot would take place chronologically before the prequel trilogy, and center around the origin of the Jedi. By May 2019, the duo were also slated to serve as co-directors of the first installment in their three films. In October of the same year however, the filmmaking duo exited development of the projects due to scheduling conflicts with projects they are developing for Netflix. Kennedy stated that the studio is open to working with the duo, and developing their films once their schedule allows it. In January 2024, the filmmaking duo announced that the working title was The First Jedi and would have followed the titular ancient protagonist. The pair cast doubt on returning to their planned trilogy, commenting on its apparent influence on James Mangold's similarly premised Dawn of the Jedi movie.
- Untitled Taika Waititi film: In May 2020, Taika Waititi signed onto the project which was stated to be the first priority for the studio, with the filmmaker Waititi serving as director from a script he is co-writing with Krysty Wilson-Cairns. In May 2022, the movie was named as the next Star Wars film to begin production ahead of Rogue Squadron, with Kennedy stating that the studio was tentatively looking towards late 2023 for a debut, but had not yet officially set a release date. By April 2023, she stated that the project is still in development, with Waititi continuing to work on the script. In April 2025, it was announced that Tony McNamara was hired to contribute to the script.
- Rogue Squadron: A standalone film following the events of Rogue One will be directed by Patty Jenkins with a script written by Matthew Robinson. In April 2023, Kennedy stated that the script is still in development, with the studio considering changing the project into a television series. In March 2024, Jenkins announced that she had once again commenced working on the script; confirming that developments for the project are ongoing.
- Untitled J.D. Dillard film: In February 2020, a film was announced to be in development from director J. D. Dillard and writer Matt Owens; although, Dillard announced he was no longer to direct that film in November 2022.
- Star Wars: A Droid Story: In December 2020, an animated film centered around the adventures of R2-D2 and C-3PO was announced as being in development; the story will introduce a new heroic character to the franchise, alongside the two returning droids. The project will be a joint-venture production between Lucasfilm Animation, and Industrial Light & Magic. The film is being developed to debut via streaming, exclusively through Disney+.
- Lando: In December 2020, a spin-off series to Solo: A Star Wars Story was announced as being in development. The miniseries which was being developed exclusively for Disney+ was revealed to be centered around Landonis "Lando" Calrissian III, titled Lando. Donald Glover was confirmed at that time to be reprising the lead role, while Justin Simien was named as the series creator and showrunner. By July 2020 however, Donald and Stephen Glover were hired to replace Simien, write and redevelop the show. In September 2023, the show was repurposed to be released as a theatrical film instead.
- Untitled Simon Kinberg trilogy: In November 2024, Simon Kinberg was hired to write and produce the new trilogy of Star Wars movies. The series of movies was reported to be Episode X–XII, though this was also disputed by other sources. In September 2026, the first film of the trilogy was confirmed to be Episode X with Jon Watts attached to direct.

== Television ==
Series	Seasons	Episodes	Originally released	Network
Animated series
Droids	1	13	September 7, 1985 – June 7, 1986	ABC
Ewoks	2	26	September 7, 1985 – December 13, 1986	ABC
Clone Wars	3	25	November 7, 2003 – March 25, 2005	Cartoon Network
The Clone Wars	7	133	October 3, 2008 – May 4, 2020	Cartoon Network / Netflix / Disney+
Rebels	4	75	October 3, 2014 – March 5, 2018	Disney XD
Resistance	2	40	October 7, 2018 – January 26, 2020	Disney Channel
The Bad Batch	3	47	May 4, 2021 – May 1, 2024	Disney+
Visions	3	27	September 22, 2021 – present	Disney+
Tales	3	18	October 26, 2022 – May 4, 2025	Disney+
Young Jedi Adventures	3	55	May 4, 2023 – December 8, 2025	Disney+ / Disney Jr.
Maul – Shadow Lord	1	10	April 6, 2026 – present	Disney+
Visions Presents	1	8	August 5, 2026	Disney+ / Hulu
Live-action series
The Mandalorian	3	24	November 12, 2019 – April 19, 2023	Disney+
The Book of Boba Fett	1	7	December 29, 2021 – February 9, 2022	Disney+
Obi-Wan Kenobi	1	6	May 27 – June 22, 2022	Disney+
Andor	2	24	September 21, 2022 – May 13, 2025	Disney+
Ahsoka	1	8	August 22, 2023 – present	Disney+
The Acolyte	1	8	June 4 – July 16, 2024	Disney+
Skeleton Crew	1	8	December 2, 2024 – January 14, 2025	Disney+
Game shows
Jedi Temple Challenge	1	10	June 10 – August 5, 2020	StarWarsKids.com

=== Animated series ===
The first two animated series, Droids and Ewoks, were produced in the 1980s. They were followed by the Clone Wars animated micro-series in 2003 and the 2008 The Clone Wars. Following Disney's acquisition of Lucasfilm, all animated series released prior to 2014, apart from the 2008 series, were discarded from the franchise's canon. Subsequent animated series include Rebels, released in 2014 and The Bad Batch, released in 2021. These series follow the protagonists during the reign of the Empire. At Star Wars Celebration Japan in April 2025, Star Wars: Maul – Shadow Lord was announced and premiered in April 2026. The series covers the period following the Clone Wars where Maul tries to rebuild his defunct Shadow Collective criminal syndicate into what will eventually become Crimson Dawn on a planet unknown to the Empire. Sam Witwer returned to voice Maul. Star Wars Resistance was released in 2018. This series follows a pilot and the Resistance during the rise of the First Order.

Several micro-series, anthology series (including Star Wars Tales) and shorts have also been released by Lucasfilm since Disney's acquisition, with the earlier animated series falling under Disney's "Vintage" collection of Star Wars content.

=== Live-action series ===
The Star Wars franchise includes several live-action series. The first series, The Mandalorian, was released in 2019 for the streaming service Disney+ and is set between the original and sequel trilogies of the Skywalker Saga. Due to its success, the series spawned multiple live-action spin-offs set during the same fictional era, including The Book of Boba Fett, released in 2021; Ahsoka, released in 2023; and Skeleton Crew, released in 2024. These series follow the plight of the New Republic and its allies against the remnants of the fallen Galactic Empire.

A story focused on Obi-Wan Kenobi was planned as a film before becoming a live-action series after the box office failure of Solo in 2018. The series was released on Disney+ in 2022 and is set between the prequel and original trilogy films. It was followed by the live-action series Andor in the same year; both series follow their titular characters during the reign of the Empire.

The Acolyte is a series created by Leslye Headland set at the end of the High Republic era before the events of the Skywalker Saga, and follows an investigation into a series of murders of Jedi Masters.

=== Films and specials ===
Film	U.S. release date	Directed by	Teleplay by	Story by	Produced by	Network
Star Wars Holiday Special	November 17, 1978	Steve Binder	Pat Proft, Leonard Ripps, Bruce Vilanch, Rod Warren, and Mitzie Welch		Joe Layton, Jeff Starsh, Ken Welch, and Mitzie Welch	CBS
The Ewok Adventure	November 25, 1984	John Korty	Bob Carrau	George Lucas	Thomas G. Smith and Patricia Rose Duignan	ABC
Ewoks: The Battle for Endor	November 24, 1985	Jim Wheat and Ken Wheat	Jim Wheat and Ken Wheat	George Lucas	Thomas G. Smith and Ian Bryce	ABC

== Fictional timeline ==
The Star Wars canon fictional universe spans multiple eras, of which three are focused around each of the film trilogies. The franchise typically uses the climatic Battle of Yavin from the 1977 film as its epoch; for example, the first season of Andor takes place five years before the battle ("5 BBY"). The following eras were defined in January 2021, and further refined and expanded in April 2023:

- Dawn of the Jedi: The first Jedi wields the Force, which is set to be depicted in an upcoming untitled film.
- The Old Republic: The Galactic Republic is founded and the Jedi Order emerges to protect it. A schism within the Jedi leads to the creation of the Sith.
- The High Republic: Under the protection of the Jedi, the Republic grows into a golden age. This era includes the live-action series The Acolyte, the animated series Young Jedi Adventures, and The High Republic literary works.
- Fall of the Jedi: The Republic's Supreme Chancellor, Palpatine (secretly the Sith lord Darth Sidious), orchestrates the Clone Wars, overthrows the Republic, exterminates the Jedi Order and corrupts Anakin Skywalker. This era includes the prequel trilogy films, the animated series The Clone Wars and Tales of the Jedi, and the video game Zero Company.
- Reign of the Empire: Palpatine's Galactic Empire rules the galaxy and the remaining Jedi are hunted down. This era includes the standalone films Solo and Rogue One, the live-action series Obi-Wan Kenobi and Andor, the animated series The Bad Batch, Maul – Shadow Lord, Rebels, Tales of the Empire, and Tales of the Underworld, and the video games Jedi: Fallen Order, Jedi: Survivor and Vader Immortal.
- Age of Rebellion: The Rebellion against the Empire spreads across the galaxy, while the Jedi return with the emergence of Luke Skywalker. This era includes the original trilogy films (Note: The original trilogy depicts the galaxy as dirty and grimy in George Lucas's depiction of a "used universe".) and the video games Battlefront II, Squadrons, and Outlaws.
- The New Republic: Following the Empire's defeat, the emergent New Republic attempts to reunite the galaxy, while threatened by the remnants of the Empire. This era includes the live-action series The Mandalorian (and its film sequel The Mandalorian and Grogu), The Book of Boba Fett, Ahsoka, and Skeleton Crew.
- Rise of the First Order: The remnants of the Empire transform into the First Order but are fought by the Resistance, climaxing with the defeat of Palpatine and the Sith by the Jedi Rey. This era includes the sequel trilogy films, the animated series Resistance and the video game Tales from the Galaxy's Edge.
- New Jedi Order: Rey builds a new Jedi Order, which is set to be depicted in an upcoming untitled film, along with the unrelated upcoming film Starfighter.

The Expanded Universe of spin-off media depicts different levels of continuity, which were deemed non-canonical and rebranded as Legends on April 25, 2014, to make most subsequent works align to the episodic films, The Clone Wars film, and television series.

Many fans and creators use naming guides and generators to explore these patterns and create original character names inspired by the franchise's sound and style.

== Other media ==
From 1976 to 2014, the term Expanded Universe (EU) was an umbrella term for all officially licensed Star Wars storytelling material set outside the events depicted within the theatrical films, including novels, comics, and video games. Lucasfilm maintained internal continuity between the films and television content and the EU material until April 25, 2014, when the company announced all of the EU works would cease production. Existing works would no longer be considered canon to the franchise and subsequent reprints would be rebranded under the Star Wars Legends label, with downloadable content for the massively multiplayer online game The Old Republic the only Legends material to still be produced. The Star Wars canon was subsequently restructured to only include the existing six feature films, the animated film The Clone Wars (2008), and its companion animated series. All future projects and creative developments across all types of media would be overseen and coordinated by the story group, announced as a division of Lucasfilm created to maintain continuity and a cohesive vision on the storytelling of the franchise. Multiple comics series from Marvel and novels published by Del Rey were produced after the announcement. Since the new canon has been introduced, there has been a multitude of pieces of Expanded Universe continuity that have become a part of canon.

=== Print media ===
Star Wars in print predates the release of the first film, with the November 1976 novelization of Star Wars, initially subtitled "From the Adventures of Luke Skywalker". Credited to Lucas, it was ghostwritten by Alan Dean Foster. The first "Expanded Universe" story appeared in Marvel Comics' Star Wars #7 in January 1978 (the first six issues being an adaptation of the film), followed by Foster's sequel novel Splinter of the Mind's Eye the following month.

==== Novels ====
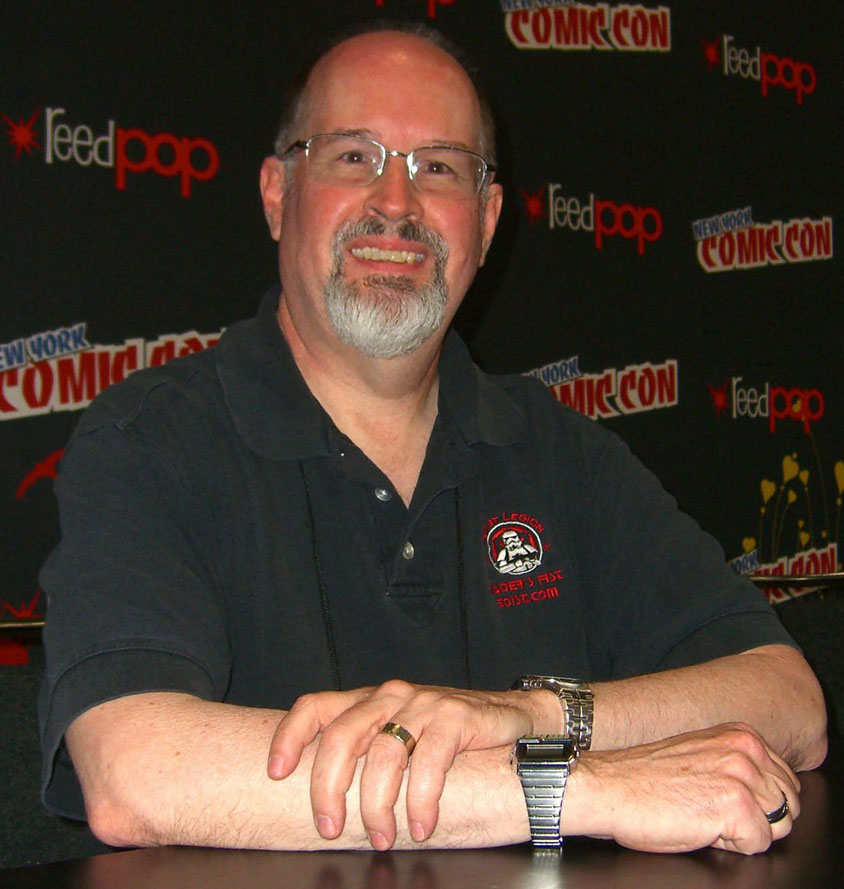
Timothy Zahn authored the Thrawn trilogy, which was widely credited with revitalizing the dormant Star Wars franchise in the early 1990s.

After penning the novelization of the original film, Foster followed it with the sequel Splinter of the Mind's Eye (1978). The novelizations of The Empire Strikes Back (1980) by Donald F. Glut and Return of the Jedi (1983) by James Kahn followed, as well as The Han Solo Adventures trilogy (1979–1980) by Brian Daley, and The Adventures of Lando Calrissian trilogy (1983) by L. Neil Smith.

Timothy Zahn's bestselling Thrawn trilogy (1991–1993) reignited interest in the franchise and introduced the popular characters Grand Admiral Thrawn, Mara Jade, Talon Karrde, and Gilad Pellaeon. (Note: Attributed to multiple references:) The first novel, Heir to the Empire, reached #1 on the New York Times Best Seller list, and the series finds Luke, Leia, and Han facing off against tactical genius Thrawn, who is plotting to retake the galaxy for the Empire. Although no longer canon the story is paralleled in The Mandalorian and Ahsoka with the titular characters and their allies facing off against Thrawn and the remnants of the Empire.

In The Courtship of Princess Leia (1994) by Dave Wolverton, set immediately before the Thrawn trilogy, Leia considers an advantageous political marriage to Prince Isolder of the planet Hapes, but she and Han ultimately marry. Steve Perry's Shadows of the Empire (1996), set between The Empire Strikes Back and Return of the Jedi, was part of a multimedia campaign that included a comic book series and video game. The novel introduced the crime lord Prince Xizor, another popular character who would appear in multiple other works. Other notable series from Bantam include the Jedi Academy trilogy (1994) by Kevin J. Anderson, the 14-book Young Jedi Knights series (1995–1998) by Anderson and Rebecca Moesta, and the X-wing series (1996–2012) by Michael A. Stackpole and Aaron Allston.

Del Rey took over Star Wars book publishing in 1999, releasing what would become a 19-installment novel series called The New Jedi Order (1999–2003). Written by multiple authors, the series was set 25 to 30 years after the original films and introduced the Yuuzhan Vong, a powerful alien race attempting to invade and conquer the entire galaxy. The bestselling multi-author series Legacy of the Force (2006–2008) chronicles the crossover of Han and Leia's son Jacen Solo to the dark side of the Force; among his evil deeds, he kills Luke's wife Mara Jade as a sacrifice to join the Sith. Although no longer canon, the story is paralleled in The Force Awakens with Han and Leia's son Ben Solo, who becomes the evil Kylo Ren. (Note: Attributed to multiple references:)

Three series set in the prequel era were published by Scholastic for younger audiences: the 18-book Jedi Apprentice (1999–2002) chronicles the adventures of Obi-Wan Kenobi and his master Qui-Gon Jinn in the years before The Phantom Menace; the 11-book Jedi Quest (2001–2004) follows Obi-Wan and his own apprentice, Anakin Skywalker in between The Phantom Menace and Attack of the Clones; and the 10-book The Last of the Jedi (2005–2008), set almost immediately after Revenge of the Sith, features Obi-Wan and the last few surviving Jedi. In 2019, a new prequel era novel, starring Qui-Gon and the young Obi-Wan, was published by Del Rey under the title Star Wars: Master and Apprentice.

Although Thrawn had been designated a Legends character in 2014, he was reintroduced into the canon in 2016 for the third season of the Rebels animated series, with Zahn returning to write more novels based on the character and set in the new canon.

==== Comics ====
Marvel Comics published a Star Wars comic book series from 1977 to 1986. (Note: Attributed to multiple references:) Original Star Wars comics were serialized in the Marvel magazine Pizzazz between 1977 and 1979. The 1977 installments were the first original Star Wars stories not directly adapted from the films to appear in print form, as they preceded those of the Star Wars comic series. From 1985 to 1987, the animated children's series Ewoks and Droids inspired comic series from Marvel's Star Comics line. According to Marvel Comics former Editor-In-Chief Jim Shooter, the strong sales of Star Wars comics saved Marvel financially in 1977 and 1978. Marvel's Star Wars series was one of the industry's top selling titles in 1979 and 1980. The only downside for Marvel was that the 100,000 copy sales quota was surpassed quickly, allowing Lippincott to renegotiate the royalty arrangements from a position of strength.

In the late 1980s, Marvel dropped a new Star Wars comic it had in development, which was picked up by Dark Horse Comics and published as the popular Dark Empire series (1991–1995). Dark Horse subsequently launched dozens of series set after the original film trilogy, including Tales of the Jedi (1993–1998), X-wing Rogue Squadron (1995–1998), Star Wars: Republic (1998–2006), Star Wars Tales (1999–2005), Star Wars: Empire (2002–2006), and Knights of the Old Republic (2006–2010).

After Disney's acquisition of Lucasfilm, it was announced in January 2014 that in 2015 the Star Wars comics license would return to Marvel Comics, whose parent company, Marvel Entertainment, Disney had purchased in 2009. Launched in 2015, the first three publications were titled Star Wars, Darth Vader, and the miniseries Princess Leia.

First announced as Project Luminous at Star Wars Celebration in April 2019, the Star Wars: The High Republic publishing initiative was revealed in a press conference in February 2020. Involving the majority of the then current officially licensed publishers, a new era set 200 years before the Skywalker Saga was explored in various books and comics. Including ongoing titles by Marvel and IDW Publishing, written by Cavan Scott and Daniel José Older respectively.

Marvel Comics will publish a one-shot comic book on September 4, 2024, that bridges the gap between the High Republic publishing initiative and the events of The Acolyte. Titled Star Wars: The Acolyte – Kelnacca, the one-shot was written by High Republic writer Cavan Scott with art by Marika Cresta. It focuses on Kelnacca, the Wookiee Jedi introduced in The Acolyte.

=== Audio ===
==== Soundtracks and singles ====
John Williams composed the soundtracks for the nine episodic films. He stated he would retire from the franchise with The Rise of Skywalker, but he composed a theme for Obi-Wan Kenobi for the miniseries and Han Solo's theme for Solo: A Star Wars Story. Williams also created the main theme for Galaxy's Edge.

Several other composers worked on other soundtracks, including John Powell (Obi-Wan Kenobi), Michael Giacchino (Rogue One), and Ludwig Göransson (The Mandalorian).

==== Audio novels ====
The first Star Wars audio work is The Story of Star Wars, an LP using audio samples from the original film and a new narration to retell the story, released in 1977. Most later printed novels were adapted into audio novels, usually released on cassette tape and re-released on CD. As of 2019, audio-only novels have been released not directly based on printed media.

==== Radio ====
Radio adaptations of the films were also produced. Lucas, a fan of the NPR-affiliated campus radio station of his alma mater the University of Southern California, licensed the Star Wars radio rights to KUSC-FM for US$1. The production used John Williams's original film score, along with Ben Burtt's sound effects.

The first was written by science-fiction author Brian Daley and directed by John Madden. It was broadcast on National Public Radio in 1981, adapting the original 1977 film into 13 episodes. Mark Hamill and Anthony Daniels reprised their film roles.

The overwhelming success, led to a 10-episode adaptation of The Empire Strikes Back debuted in 1983. Billy Dee Williams joined the other two stars, reprising his role as Lando Calrissian.

In 1983, Buena Vista Records released an original, 30-minute Star Wars audio drama titled Rebel Mission to Ord Mantell, written by Daley. In the 1990s, Time Warner Audio Publishing adapted several Star Wars series from Dark Horse Comics into audio dramas: the three-part Dark Empire saga, Tales of the Jedi, Dark Lords of the Sith, the Dark Forces trilogy, and Crimson Empire (1998). Return of the Jedi was adapted into 6-episodes in 1996, featuring Daniels.

=== Video games ===
The Star Wars franchise has spawned over one hundred computer, video, and board games, dating back to some of the earliest home consoles. Some are based directly on the movie material, while others rely heavily on the non-canonical Expanded Universe (rebranded as Star Wars Legends and removed from the canon in 2014). Star Wars games have gone through three significant development eras, marked by a change in leadership among the developers: the early licensed games, those developed after the creation of LucasArts, and those created after the closure of the Lucasfilm division by Disney and the transfer of the license to Electronic Arts.

==== Early licensed games (1979–1993) ====
The first officially licensed electronic Star Wars game was Kenner's 1979 table-top Star Wars Electronic Battle Command. In 1982, Parker Brothers published the first Star Wars video game for the Atari 2600, Star Wars: The Empire Strikes Back, followed soon the year later by Star Wars: Jedi Arena, the first video game to depict lightsaber combat. They were followed in 1983 by Atari's rail shooter arcade game Star Wars, with vector graphics to replicate the Death Star trench run scene from the 1977 film. The next game, Star Wars: Return of the Jedi (1984), has more traditional raster graphics, while the following Star Wars: The Empire Strikes Back (1985) has vector graphics.

Platform games were made for the Nintendo Entertainment System, including the Japan-exclusive Star Wars (1987), an international Star Wars (1991), and Star Wars: The Empire Strikes Back (1992). Super Star Wars (1992) was released for the Super Nintendo Entertainment System, with two sequels over the next two years.

==== LucasArts and modern self-published games (1993–2014) ====
Lucasfilm founded its own video game company in 1982, becoming best known for adventure games and World War II flight combat games, but as George Lucas took more interest in the increasing success of the video game market, he wanted to have more creative control over the games and founded his own development company, LucasArts. Improved graphics allowed games to tell complex narratives, which allowed for the retelling of the films, and eventually original narratives set in the same continuity, with voice-overs and CGI cutscenes. In 1993, LucasArts released Star Wars: X-Wing, the first self-published Star Wars video game and the first space flight simulator based on the franchise. It was one of the bestselling video games of 1993 and established its own series of games. The Rogue Squadron series was released between 1998 and 2003, also focusing on space battles set during the films.

Dark Forces (1995), a hybrid adventure game incorporating puzzles and strategy, was the first Star Wars first-person shooter. It featured gameplay and graphical features not then common in other games, made possible by LucasArts' custom-designed game engine, the Jedi. The game was well received, and it was followed by four sequels. The series introduced Kyle Katarn, who would appear in multiple games, novels, and comics. Katarn is a former stormtrooper who joins the Rebellion and becomes a Jedi, a plot arc similar to that of Finn in the sequel trilogy films. A massively multiplayer online role-playing game, Star Wars Galaxies, was in operation from 2003 until 2011. After Disney bought Lucasfilm, LucasArts ceased its role as a developer in 2013, although it still operates as a licensor.

==== EA Star Wars (2014–present) ====
Following its acquisition of the franchise, Disney reassigned video game rights to Electronic Arts. Games made during this era are considered canonical, and feature more influence from the Star Wars filmmakers. Disney partnered with Lenovo to create the augmented reality video game Jedi Challenges, released in November 2017. In August 2018, it was announced that Zynga would publish free-to-play Star Wars mobile games. The Battlefront games received a canonical reboot with Star Wars: Battlefront in November 2015, which was followed by a sequel, Battlefront II, in November 2017. A single-player action-adventure game, Star Wars Jedi: Fallen Order, with an original story and cast of characters, was released in November 2019. A space combat game titled Star Wars: Squadrons, which builds upon the space battles from Battlefront, was released in October 2020. Star Wars Jedi: Survivor, a sequel to Fallen Order, was released in April 2023.

=== Theme park attractions ===
In addition to the Disneyland ride Star Tours (1987) and its successor, Star Tours: The Adventures Continue (2011), many live attractions have been held at Disney parks, including the traveling exhibition Where Science Meets Imagination, the Space Mountain spin-off Hyperspace Mountain, a walkthrough Launch Bay, and the night-time A Galactic Spectacular. An immersive themed area called Galaxy's Edge (2019) opened at Disneyland and opened at Walt Disney World in mid-2019. A themed hotel, Star Wars: Galactic Starcruiser, operated from 2022 to 2023 at Walt Disney World.

Title	Park(s)	Opening date	Closing date
Star Tours	Disneyland	January 9, 1987	July 27, 2010
Star Tours	Tokyo Disneyland	July 12, 1989	April 2, 2012
Star Tours	Disney's Hollywood Studios	December 15, 1989	September 7, 2010
Star Tours	Disneyland Paris	April 12, 1992	March 16, 2016
Star Wars Weekends	Disney's Hollywood Studios	1997	November 2015
Star Wars: Where Science Meets Imagination	Multiple locations	October 19, 2005	March 23, 2014
Jedi Training Academy	Disneyland	October 1, 2006	November 15, 2015
Jedi Training Academy	Disney's Hollywood Studios	October 9, 2007	October 5, 2015
Star Tours: The Adventures Continue	Disney's Hollywood Studios	May 20, 2011	N/A (operating)
Star Tours: The Adventures Continue	Disneyland	June 3, 2011	N/A (operating)
Star Tours: The Adventures Continue	Tokyo Disneyland	May 7, 2013	N/A (operating)
Star Tours: The Adventures Continue	Disneyland Paris	March 26, 2017	N/A (operating)
Star Wars: Hyperspace Mountain	Disneyland	November 14, 2015	May 31, 2017
Star Wars: Hyperspace Mountain	Hong Kong Disneyland	June 11, 2016	N/A (operating)
Star Wars: Hyperspace Mountain	Disneyland Paris	May 7, 2017	N/A (operating)
Star Wars Launch Bay	Disneyland	November 16, 2015	N/A (operating)
Star Wars Launch Bay	Disney's Hollywood Studios	December 4, 2015	N/A (operating)
Star Wars Launch Bay	Shanghai Disneyland	June 16, 2016	N/A (operating)
Jedi Training: Trials of the Temple	Disney's Hollywood Studios	December 1, 2015	N/A (operating)
Jedi Training: Trials of the Temple	Disneyland	December 8, 2015	N/A (operating)
Jedi Training: Trials of the Temple	Disneyland Paris	July 11, 2015	N/A (operating)
Jedi Training: Trials of the Temple	Hong Kong Disneyland	June 25, 2016	N/A (operating)
Star Wars: A Galactic Spectacular	Disney's Hollywood Studios	June 17, 2016	N/A (operating)
Star Wars: Galactic Starcruiser	Disney's Hollywood Studios	March 1, 2022	September 30, 2023
Star Wars: Galaxy's Edge	Disneyland	May 31, 2019	N/A (operating)
Star Wars: Galaxy's Edge	Disney's Hollywood Studios	August 29, 2019	N/A (operating)
Star Wars: Millennium Falcon - Smugglers Run	Disneyland	May 31, 2019	N/A (operating)
Star Wars: Millennium Falcon - Smugglers Run	Disney's Hollywood Studios	August 29, 2019	N/A (operating)
Star Wars: Rise of the Resistance	Disney's Hollywood Studios	December 5, 2019	N/A (operating)
Star Wars: Rise of the Resistance	Disneyland	January 17, 2020	N/A (operating)

=== Multimedia projects ===
A multimedia project involves works released across multiple types of media. Shadows of the Empire (1996) was a multimedia project set between The Empire Strikes Back and Return of the Jedi that included a novel by Steve Perry, a comic book series, a video game, and action figures. The Force Unleashed (2008–2010) was a similar project set between Revenge of the Sith and A New Hope that included a novel, a 2008 video game and its 2010 sequel, a graphic novel, a role-playing game supplement, and toys.

=== Merchandising ===
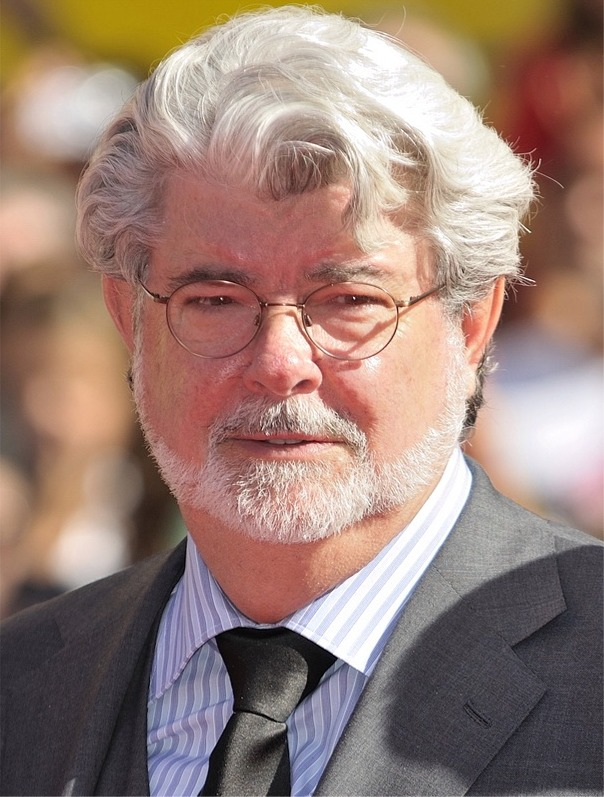
George Lucas made much of his fortune by retaining the rights to Star Wars merchandising.

The success of the Star Wars films led the franchise to become one of the most merchandised franchises in the world. While filming the original 1977 film, George Lucas decided to take a $500,000 pay cut to his salary as director in exchange for full ownership of the franchise's merchandising rights. By 1987, the first three films have made US$2.6 billion in merchandising revenue. By 2012, the first six films produced approximately US$20 billion in merchandising revenue.

Kenner Products made the first Star Wars action figures to coincide with the release of the original film, and today the original figures are highly valuable. Since the 1990s, Hasbro holds the rights to create action figures based on the saga. Pez dispensers began to be produced in 1997. Star Wars was the first intellectual property to be licensed in Lego history. Lego has produced animated parody short films and mini-series to promote their Star Wars sets. The Lego Star Wars video games are critically acclaimed bestsellers.

In 1977, the board game Star Wars: Escape from the Death Star was released. (Note: It is not to be confused with the board game of the same name published in 1990.) A Star Wars Monopoly and themed versions of Trivial Pursuit and Battleship were released in 1997, with updated versions released in subsequent years. The board game Risk has been adapted in two editions by Hasbro: The Clone Wars Edition (2005) and the Original Trilogy Edition (2006). Three Star Wars tabletop role-playing games have been developed: a version by West End Games in the 1980s and 1990s, one by Wizards of the Coast in the 2000s, and one by Fantasy Flight Games in the 2010s.

Star Wars Trading Cards have been published since the first "blue" series, by Topps, in 1977. Dozens of series have been produced, with Topps being the licensed creator in the United States. Each card series are of film stills or original art. Many of the cards have become highly collectible with some very rare "promos", such as the 1993 Galaxy Series II "floating Yoda" P3 card often commanding US$1,000 or more. While most "base" or "common card" sets are plentiful, many "insert" or "chase cards" are very rare. From 1995 until 2001, Decipher, Inc. had the license for, created, and produced the Star Wars Customizable Card Game.

== Themes ==
Star Wars features elements such as knighthood, chivalry, and Jungian archetypes such as "the shadow". There are also many references to Christianity, such as in the appearance of Darth Maul, whose design draws heavily from traditional depictions of the devil. Anakin was conceived of a virgin birth, and is assumed to be the "Chosen One", a messianic individual. However, unlike Jesus, Anakin falls from grace, remaining evil as Darth Vader until Return of the Jedi. According to Adam Driver, sequel trilogy villain Kylo Ren, who idolizes Vader, believes he is "doing what he thinks is right". George Lucas has said that the theme of the saga is redemption.

The saga draws heavily from the hero's journey, an archetypical template developed by comparative mythologist Joseph Campbell. Each character—primarily Anakin, Luke, and Rey—follows the steps of the cycle or undergoes its reversal, becoming the villain. A defining step of the journey is "Atonement with the Father". Obi-Wan's loss of a father figure could have impacted his relationship with Anakin, whom both Obi-Wan and Palpatine are fatherlike mentors to. Luke's discovery that Vader is his father has strong repercussions on the saga and is regarded as one of the most influential plot twists in cinema. Supreme Leader Snoke encourages Kylo Ren to kill his father, Han Solo. Kylo uses the fact that Rey is an orphan to tempt her into joining the dark side. According to Inverse, the final scene in The Last Jedi, which depicts servant children playing with a toy of Luke and one boy using the Force, symbolizes that "the Force can be found in people with humble beginnings."

=== Historical influences ===
Political science has been an important element of Star Wars since the franchise launched in 1977, focusing on a struggle between democracy and dictatorship. Battles featuring the Ewoks and Gungans against the Empire and Trade Federation, respectively, represent the clash between a primitive society and a more advanced one, similar to the Vietnam-American War. Darth Vader's design was initially inspired by Samurai armor, and also incorporated a German military helmet. Originally, Lucas conceived of the Sith as a group that served the Emperor in the same way the Schutzstaffel (SS) served Adolf Hitler, but this was condensed into one character in the form of Vader. Stormtroopers borrow the name of World War I German "shock" troopers. Imperial officers wear uniforms resembling those of German forces during World War II, and political and security officers resemble the black-clad SS down to the stylized silver death's head on their caps. World War II terms were used for names in the films; e.g. the planets Kessel (a term that refers to a group of encircled forces) and Hoth (after a German general who served on the snow-laden Eastern Front). Shots of the commanders looking through AT-AT walker viewscreens in The Empire Strikes Back resemble tank interiors, and space battles in the original film were based on World War I and World War II dogfights.

Palpatine being a chancellor before becoming the Emperor in the prequel trilogy alludes to Hitler's role before appointing himself Führer. Lucas has also drawn parallels to historical dictators such as Julius Caesar, Napoleon Bonaparte, and politicians like Richard Nixon. (Note: In his early drafts, Lucas used the plot point of a dictator staying in power with the support of the military. In his comment (made in the prequel trilogy era), Lucas attributed this to Nixon's supposed intention to defy the 22nd Amendment, but the president resigned and never ran for a third term.) The Great Jedi Purge mirrors the events of the Night of the Long Knives. The corruption of the Galactic Republic is modeled after the fall of the democratic Roman Republic and the formation of an empire.

On the inspiration for the First Order formed "from the ashes of the Empire", The Force Awakens director J. J. Abrams spoke of conversations the writers had about how the Nazis could have escaped to Argentina after WWII and "started working together again."

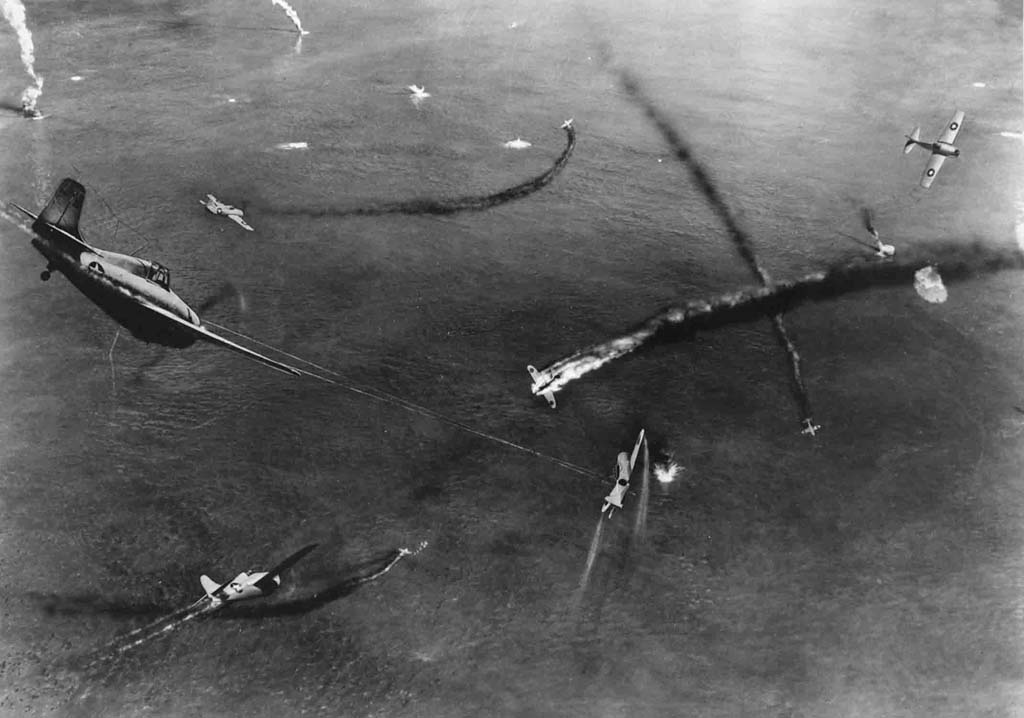
The aerial warfare of WWII inspired the space fights.

The flag and iconography of the Empire resembles those of the Nazi Party and Germany during its rule.

== Cultural impact ==

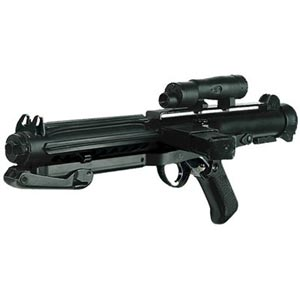
The lightsaber and the blaster are iconic elements of the franchise.

The Star Wars saga has had a significant impact on popular culture, with references to its fictional universe deeply embedded in everyday life. Phrases like "evil empire" and "May the Force be with you" have become part of the popular lexicon. The first Star Wars film in 1977 was a cultural unifier, enjoyed by a wide spectrum of people. The film can be said to have helped launch the science-fiction boom of the late 1970s and early 1980s, making science-fiction films a mainstream genre. The widespread impact made it a prime target for parody works and homages, with popular examples including Hardware Wars, Spaceballs, The Family Guy Trilogy and Robot Chicken: Star Wars.

In 1989, the Library of Congress selected the original Star Wars film for preservation in the U.S. National Film Registry, as being "culturally, historically, or aesthetically significant." The Empire Strikes Back was selected in 2010, and Return of the Jedi was selected in 2021. 35 mm reels of the 1997 Special Editions were the versions initially presented for preservation because of the difficulty of transferring from the original prints, but it was later revealed that the Library possesses a copyright deposit print of the original theatrical releases.

In December 2025, a 1977 painting that introduced the world to Star Wars sold for record $3.875 million at Heritage Auctions, becoming the most expensive piece of memorabilia in the franchise's history.

=== Industry ===
The original Star Wars film was a huge success for 20th Century Fox, and was credited for reinvigorating the company. Within three weeks of the film's release, the studio's stock price doubled to a record high. Prior to 1977, 20th Century Fox's greatest annual profits were $37 million, while in 1977, the company broke that record by posting a profit of $79 million. The franchise helped Fox to change from an almost bankrupt production company to a thriving media conglomerate. With over $10.3 billion in worldwide box office receipts, Star Wars is the second-highest-grossing film franchise of all time.

Star Wars fundamentally changed the aesthetics and narratives of Hollywood films, switching the focus of Hollywood-made films from deep, meaningful stories based on dramatic conflict, themes and irony, to sprawling special-effects-laden blockbusters, as well as changing the Hollywood film industry in fundamental ways. Before Star Wars, special effects in films had not appreciably advanced since the 1950s. The commercial success of Star Wars created a boom in state-of-the-art special effects in the late 1970s. Along with Jaws, Star Wars started the tradition of the summer blockbuster film in the entertainment industry, where films open on many screens at the same time and profitable franchises are important. It created the model for the major film trilogy and showed that merchandising rights on a film could generate more money than the film itself did.

Film critic Roger Ebert wrote in his book The Great Movies, "Like The Birth of a Nation and Citizen Kane, Star Wars was a technical watershed that influenced many of the movies that came after." It began a new generation of special effects and high-energy motion pictures. The film was one of the first films to link genres together to invent a new, high-concept genre for filmmakers to build upon. Finally, along with Steven Spielberg's Jaws, it shifted the film industry's focus away from personal filmmaking of the 1970s and towards fast-paced, big-budget blockbusters for younger audiences.

Some critics have blamed Star Wars and Jaws for "ruining" Hollywood by shifting its focus from "sophisticated" films such as The Godfather, Taxi Driver, and Annie Hall to films about spectacle and juvenile fantasy, and for the industry shift from stand-alone, one and done films, towards blockbuster franchises with multiple sequels and prequels. One such critic, Peter Biskind, complained, "When all was said and done, Lucas and Spielberg returned the 1970s audience, grown sophisticated on a diet of European and New Hollywood films, to the simplicities of the pre-1960s Golden Age of movies... They marched backward through the looking-glass." In an opposing view, Tom Shone wrote that through Star Wars and Jaws, Lucas and Spielberg "didn't betray cinema at all: they plugged it back into the grid, returning the medium to its roots as a carnival sideshow, a magic act, one big special effect", which was "a kind of rebirth".

The original Star Wars trilogy is widely considered one of the best film trilogies in history. Numerous filmmakers have been influenced by Star Wars, including Damon Lindelof, Dean Devlin, Roland Emmerich, John Lasseter, David Fincher, Joss Whedon, John Singleton, Kevin Smith, and later Star Wars directors J. J. Abrams and Gareth Edwards. Lucas's concept of a "used universe" particularly influenced Ridley Scott's Blade Runner (1982) and Alien (1979), James Cameron's Aliens (1986) as well as The Terminator (1984), George Miller's Mad Max 2 (1981), and Peter Jackson's The Lord of the Rings trilogy (2001–2003). Christopher Nolan cited Star Wars as an influence when making the 2010 blockbuster film Inception.

==== Fan works ====
The Star Wars saga has inspired many fans to create their own non-canon material set in the Star Wars galaxy. In recent years, this has ranged from writing fan fiction to creating fan films. In 2002, Lucasfilm sponsored the first annual Official Star Wars Fan Film Awards, officially recognizing filmmakers and the genre. Because of concerns over potential copyright and trademark issues, however, the contest was initially open only to parodies, mockumentaries, and documentaries. Fan fiction films set in the Star Wars universe were originally ineligible, but in 2007, Lucasfilm changed the submission standards to allow in-universe fiction entries. Lucasfilm has allowed but not endorsed the creation of fan fiction, as long as it does not attempt to make a profit.

==== Fan communities and cosplay ====
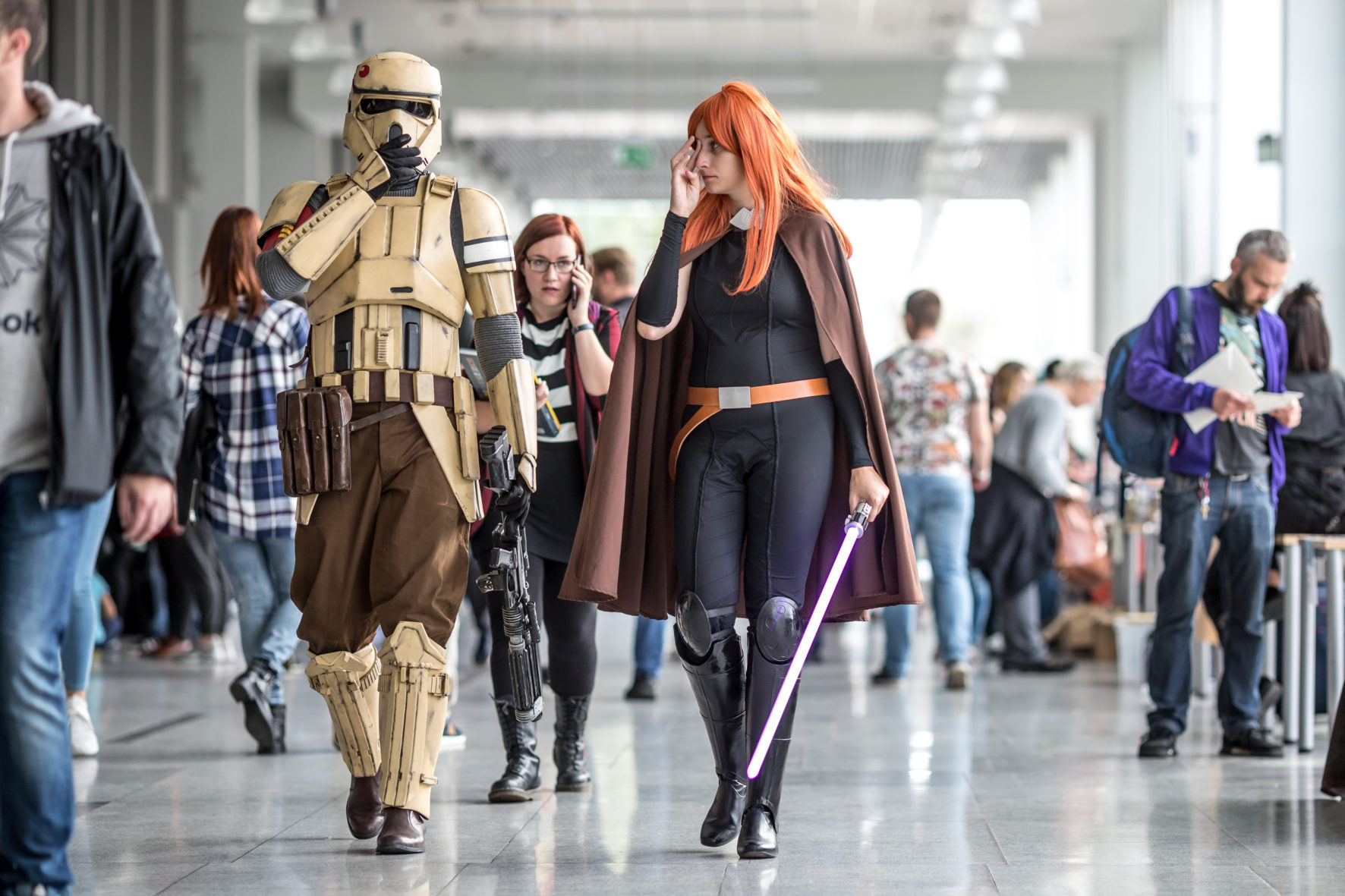
Star Wars cosplayers at the 31st International Festival of Comics and Games in Poland

Star Wars cosplay has developed into an international form of fan activity centered on the creation, wearing and presentation of costumes based on characters from the Star Wars universe. One of the largest organized communities is the 501st Legion, an international fan-run costuming organization founded in 1997; its members create detailed costumes representing Stormtroopers, Sith, clone troopers, bounty hunters and other characters, and participate in conventions, charity activities and volunteer work. Star Wars costuming takes place both at dedicated events, such as Star Wars Celebration, and at large multi-genre conventions including San Diego Comic-Con and the New York Comic Con. In Europe, Star Wars cosplay is represented at major popular-culture conventions including MCM London Comic Con in the United Kingdom, where Star Wars characters such as Jedi feature in the convention's cosplay program, and Lucca Comics & Games in Italy, which has hosted dedicated Star Wars cosplay contests, appearances by the 501st Legion and Rebel Legion, and large-scale Star Wars parades. In Poland, the practice is represented, among other events, at the International Festival of Comics and Games, which incorporates cosplay into its program and has hosted Star Wars-related activities and appearances by members of the 501st Legion.

=== Academia ===
As the characters and the storyline of the original trilogy are so well known, educators have used the films in the classroom as a learning resource. For example, a project in Western Australia honed elementary school students' storytelling skills by role-playing action scenes from the movies and later creating props and audio/visual scenery to enhance their performance. Others have used the films to encourage second-level students to integrate technology in the science classroom by making prototype lightsabers. Similarly, psychiatrists in New Zealand and the U.S. have advocated their use in the university classroom to explain different types of psychopathology.

== See also ==
- 501st Legion
- Architecture of Star Wars
- Comparison of Star Trek and Star Wars
- Jedi census phenomenon
- Jediism
- List of space science fiction franchises
- List of Star Wars characters
- List of Star Wars creatures
- List of Star Wars planets and moons
- Music of Star Wars
- Physics and Star Wars
- Star Wars Celebration
- Star Wars Day
- Star Wars documentaries
- Star Wars: The High Republic
- Space warfare in fiction
- The Force
- The Story of Star Wars
- Technology in Star Wars
