= The Specials (TV series) =

British Internet reality TV series

- Genre: Reality television
- Starring: Sam Powell; Lucy Hatfield; Lewis Carr; Hilly German; Megan Kenward
- Narrated by: Sam Powell; Lucy Hatfield; Lewis Carr; Megan Kenward
- Country of origin: United Kingdom
- Original language: English
- No. of seasons: 2
- No. of episodes: 13

Production
- Executive producers: Carolyn Strauss; D. B. Weiss; Rosie O'Donnell; Oprah Winfrey; Sheri Salata
- Producers: Katy Lock; Daniel May
- Running time: 21 minutes
- Production company: KADA Media

Original release
- Network: OWN
- Release: 2 September 2009
- Release: 7 September 2014

The Specials is a reality television series that follows the lives of five friends with intellectual disabilities living together in the same house in Brighton. The five young-adult housemates, Sam, Hilly, Lewis, Megan, and Lucy, aged between 19 and 23, include individuals with Williams syndrome and Down syndrome. The series premiered on its website on 2 September 2009 and ran until mid-November 2009, featuring weekly 10-minute episodes

The series was originally made as a web-series, the show has since made the transition to television.

The series received critical attention for its depiction of independent living for adults with intellectual disabilities. It was used in a Disability Studies course that focuses on media and disability at City University of New York in summer 2011. Michael Shaw of Tubefilter compared the series to The Real World, writing that "inner-house romance and friendship rule, minus the evil."

== Synopsis ==
Created by producer/director Katy Lock and Daniel May, the series follows the independent living venture that arose when 20-year-old Hilly told her parents she wanted to live with her friends. Hilly's parents, Carol and Dafydd Williams, set up Small Opportunities, the company that runs the house where the housemates in The Specials live.

== Episodes ==
Season 1 consists of the web series with some extra footage recut into six 21-minute episodes. It launched together with season 2 on OWN as a back-to-back marathon on 7 September 2014. Season 2 consists of seven 21-minute episodes, and picks up 2 years after the end of the first season.

== Web series ==
The show was initially launched as a web-series on The Specials website. Consisting of ten 10–15 minute episodes, the first episode was released on 2 September 2009. Subsequent episodes were released roughly every fortnight, with the 10th and last released on 7 December 2009.

The web series chronicles the housemates, then aged between 19 and 23, beginning when Megan moves into the house. Episodes depict their daily routines, including life skills classes, meal preparation, and employment at a charity shop, alongside activities such as traveling, surfing, and competing in a Special Olympics equestrian event.

== Transition to television ==
The show's creators Katy Lock and Daniel May were contacted by Carolyn Strauss (executive producer of "Game of Thrones" and former president of HBO Entertainment). She had been introduced to the web series by D. B. Weiss (co-creator of "Game of Thrones"). Together, and with the help of Rosie O'Donnell they brought it to executives at OWN, including Oprah Winfrey. OWN acquired two seasons of the show.

== Awards and nominations ==
- Winner, Webby Award in the Reality Category, 14th Annual Webby Awards 2010.
- Winner, People's Choice Award in the Reality Category, 14th Annual Webby Awards 2010.
- Winner, Festival Cinema Tous Ecrans 'Prix Titra Films S.A.,' November 2010.
- Winner, Best Web Series, National Youth Disability Film Awards UK, December 2010.
- Finalist, Original Series category, Vimeo Awards 2010.
