= Star Wars Risk: The Original Trilogy Edition =

Board game

- Players: 2–5
- Setup time: 5–10 minutes
- Playing time: 1–8 hours (player dependent)
- Chance: medium
- Age range: 10+
- Skills: Tactics, Strategy, and Negotiation

Star Wars Risk: The Original Trilogy Edition is a commercial strategic board game, produced by Parker Brothers, a division of Hasbro. It is a variation of the classic board game Risk, with the rules and appearance altered to fit within the fictional Star Wars universe, during the Galactic Civil War (Episodes 4, 5, and 6) period. It was released in November 2006, almost two years after the release of Star Wars Risk: The Clone Wars Edition.

== Overview ==
Unlike the generic armies differentiated only by their colour in the classic game of Risk, in the Star Wars Original Trilogy Edition there are three distinct factions: the Empire, the Rebel Alliance and the Hutts.

While any number of players between two and five are able to play, the game is optimized for three- or five-player games, in which the Hutt faction is player-controlled. In two- or four-person play, the Hutt pieces can still be placed on the board to act as an inactive neutral force to deepen gameplay.

The Empire and Rebel Alliance factions each have two sets of differently coloured figurines (orange and yellow for the Rebels, and two shades of gray for the Imperials), meaning up to two players can team up and control their own separate armies within each of those factions, facilitating the four- and five-person gameplay. There is only one set of green figurines for the Hutt faction.

The game board uses a similar system of "territories" and "continents" to the original game of Risk, but in this edition they are replaced by "planets" and "regions," respectively. Many notable planets and moons from the Star Wars saga and Star Wars expanded universe are represented, such as Coruscant, Tatooine, and Nar Shaddaa. The grouping of the planets into regions roughly equates the commonly accepted maps of the Star Wars galaxy, with a few exceptions, such as Ord Mantell's placement in the Outer Rim region instead of the Mid Rim.

The game can be played with standard Risk rules or The Original Trilogy Edition rules

== Object ==
When playing by the Original Trilogy Edition rules, each of the three factions has its own victory condition.

The Empire must eliminate all Rebel forces.

The Rebel Alliance must find and destroy the Emperor, who will be hidden under one of the Imperial Bases.

The Hutts must take control of 10 out of the 13 designated resource planets on the board.

The moment one of these victory conditions has been met by the respective faction, the game is over and that faction has won.

== Special components ==
=== Faction-specific figurines ===
Unlike the generic infantryman, cavalryman, and artillery piece figurines (representing one, five, and ten units, respectively) of the classic Risk, this edition includes figurines based on faction-specific characters. Each faction has two figurines, one representing a single unit, the other representing three. Also, as previously stated, the Rebel pieces are split between red and yellow figurines, the Imperial pieces between two shades of gray figurines, and all the Hutt figurines are green.

In the Imperial armies are two Death Stars. The Death Star is a special Imperial unit that can protect your own planets from attack, and destroy other planets.
