= D. B. Weiss =

American writer and producer (born 1971)

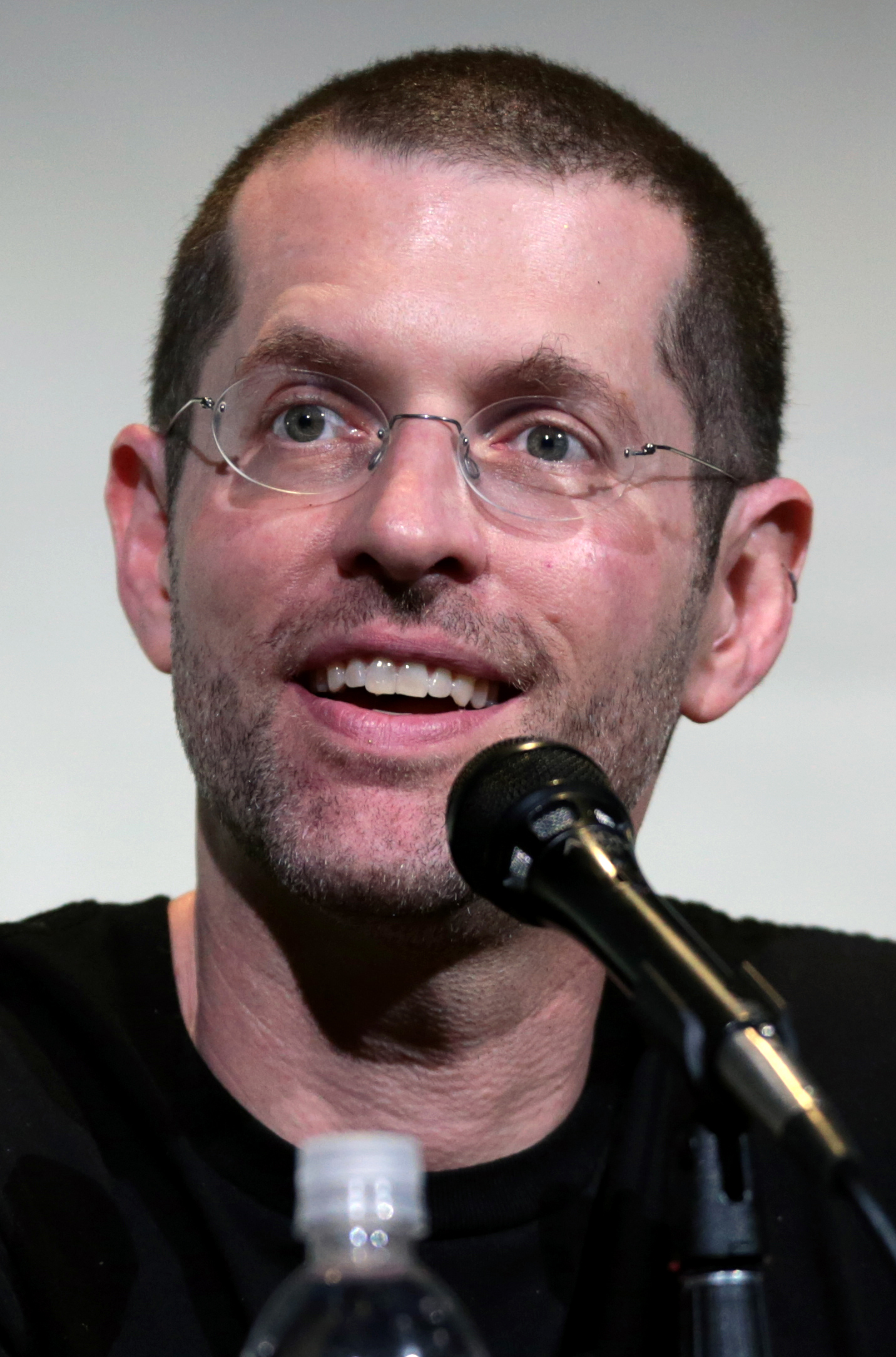
- Weiss in 2016
- Born: Daniel Brett Weiss; April 23, 1971 (age 55); Chicago, Illinois, US
- Education: Wesleyan University (BA); Trinity College, Dublin (MPhil); University of Iowa (MFA)
- Occupations: Television producer; screenwriter
- Spouse: Andrea Troyer
- Children: 2

Daniel Brett Weiss (/waɪs/; born April 23, 1971) is an American screenwriter and television producer. Along with his collaborator David Benioff, he is best known for co-creating Game of Thrones (2011–2019), the HBO adaptation of George R. R. Martin's series of books, A Song of Ice and Fire. He also wrote and produced the 2022 American teen comedy-drama Metal Lords.

== Early life ==
Weiss was born and raised in Chicago, Illinois. His family is Jewish, with ancestral roots in Germany. He graduated from Wesleyan University. He earned a Master of Philosophy in Irish literature from Trinity College Dublin, where he wrote his thesis, Understanding the (Net) Wake. It explores James Joyce's novel Finnegans Wake. Weiss later earned a Master of Fine Arts in creative writing from the Iowa Writers' Workshop.

== Career ==
Weiss worked as personal assistant on films such as The Viking Sagas for New Line Cinema. For a brief period, he also worked as a personal assistant for musician Glenn Frey.

When Weiss went to Dublin in 1995 to study Anglo-Irish literature, he met David Benioff, the screenwriter of Troy. Three years later, around 1998, they met again after his return to the US in Santa Monica, California.

Weiss and Benioff co-wrote a screenplay for a film titled The Headmaster, but it was never made. In 2003, they were hired to collaborate on a new script based on Orson Scott Card's book Ender's Game, in consultation with the then-designated director Wolfgang Petersen. It was not used.

Weiss's 2003 debut novel, Lucky Wander Boy, is themed around video games. In 2006, he said he had written a second novel that "needs a second draft". The same year, Weiss completed a screenplay for a film adaptation of the video game series Halo, based on a script by Alex Garland. Director Neill Blomkamp declared the project dead in late 2007.

Weiss also worked on a script for a prequel to I Am Legend, but in May 2011, director Francis Lawrence said that he did not think the prequel would ever happen.

Weiss collaborated with Benioff on the HBO television series Game of Thrones, based on George R. R. Martin's book series A Song of Ice and Fire. Benioff and Weiss also directed three episodes together. For the first two, they flipped a coin to decide who would get the credit on the show. Weiss received directing credit for "Two Swords", Season 4 episode 1, while Benioff was credited for "Walk of Punishment", Season 3 episode 3. Benioff and Weiss were both credited for co-directing the series finale, "The Iron Throne".

On July 19, 2017, Weiss announced that he and Benioff were going to begin production on another HBO series, Confederate, after the final season of Game of Thrones. Weiss and Benioff said, "We have discussed Confederate for years, originally as a concept for a feature film, but our experience on Thrones has convinced us that no one provides a bigger, better storytelling canvas than HBO." In January 2020, HBO President Casey Bloys confirmed that the project had been officially canceled.

On February 6, 2018, Disney announced that Weiss and Benioff would write and produce a new series of Star Wars films after the last season of Game of Thrones ended in 2019. Toward the end of the last season, a petition to HBO was started on Change.org. It described showrunners Benioff and Weiss as "woefully incompetent writers" and demanded "competent writers" to remake the eighth season of Game of Thrones in a manner "that makes sense". The petition eventually amassed over 1.5 million signatures. In the Chicago Sun Times, Richard Roeper wrote that the backlash to the eighth season was so great that he doubted he had "ever seen the level of fan (and to a lesser degree, critical) vitriol leveled at" Game of Thrones.

In early 2019, Weiss and Benioff entered into an exclusive $200 million deal with Netflix to produce several films and television shows exclusively for it. In late October 2019, it was reported that Weiss and Benioff had exited their deal with Disney due to their commitments to Netflix.

Weiss and Benioff's first project on Netflix was as directors of Leslie Jones's stand-up comedy special Time Machine.

In September 2020, it was announced that Weiss, Benioff and Alexander Woo would write and executive produce the Netflix series 3 Body Problem, based on the similarly named Chinese novel series.

== Personal life ==
Weiss and his wife, Andrea Troyer, have two children.

== Bibliography ==
=== Author ===
Title	Year	Type
Lucky Wander Boy	2003	Novel

== Filmography ==
Film

Year	Title	Writer	Producer	Director
2022	Metal Lords	Yes	Yes	Peter Sollett

Television

Year(s)	Title	Director	Writer	Executive Producer	Creator	Notes
2011–2019	Game of Thrones	Yes	Yes	Yes	Yes	Directed and wrote episodes "Two Swords" and "The Iron Throne"; Wrote 45 episodes
2013–2017	It's Always Sunny in Philadelphia	No	Yes	No	No	Wrote episode "Flowers for Charlie"; Cameo as "Bored Lifeguard #2" (In episode "The Gang Goes to a Water Park")
2014	The Specials	No	No	Yes	No	
2020	Leslie Jones: Time Machine	Yes	No	No	No	TV special; Co-director with David Benioff
2021	The Chair	No	No	Yes	No	
2024–present	3 Body Problem	No	Yes	Yes	Yes	Wrote 4 episodes
2025	Death by Lightning	No	No	Yes	No	

== Awards and nominations ==
Year	Title	Award/Nominations
2011–2019	Game of Thrones	Primetime Emmy Award for Outstanding Drama Series (2015,2016,2018 and 2019)
2011–2019	Game of Thrones	Primetime Emmy Award for Outstanding Writing for a Drama Series (2015–2016)
2011–2019	Game of Thrones	Hugo Award for Best Dramatic Presentation, Long Form (2012)
2011–2019	Game of Thrones	Hugo Award for Best Dramatic Presentation, Short Form (2013–2014)
2011–2019	Game of Thrones	Producers Guild of America Award for Best Episodic Drama (2015)
2011–2019	Game of Thrones	Golden Nymph Awards for Outstanding International Producer (2012)
2011–2019	Game of Thrones	Nominated—Primetime Emmy Award for Outstanding Drama Series (2011–2014)
2011–2019	Game of Thrones	Nominated—Primetime Emmy Award for Outstanding Writing for a Drama Series (2011–2014)
2011–2019	Game of Thrones	Nominated—Producers Guild of America Award for Best Episodic Drama (2011–2014, 2016, 2018)
2011–2019	Game of Thrones	Nominated—BAFTA for Best International Programme (2013)
2011–2019	Game of Thrones	Nominated—Writers Guild of America Award for Dramatic Series (2011–2012, 2014–2016, 2018)
2011–2019	Game of Thrones	Nominated—Writers Guild of America Award for Episodic Drama (2015–2016)
2011–2019	Game of Thrones	Nominated—Writers Guild of America Award for New Series (2011)
2011–2019	Game of Thrones	Nominated—Hugo Award for Best Dramatic Presentation, Short Form (2015, 2017)
2011–2019	Game of Thrones	Nominated—USC Scripter Award for Best Adapted Screenplay (2016–2017)
2011–2019	Game of Thrones	Nominated—Humanitas Prize for 60 Minute Network or Syndicated Television (2017)
2024	3 Body Problem	Nominated—Primetime Emmy Award for Outstanding Drama Series (2024)

== See also ==
- List of awards and nominations received by Game of Thrones
