= Carolyn Strauss =

American television producer

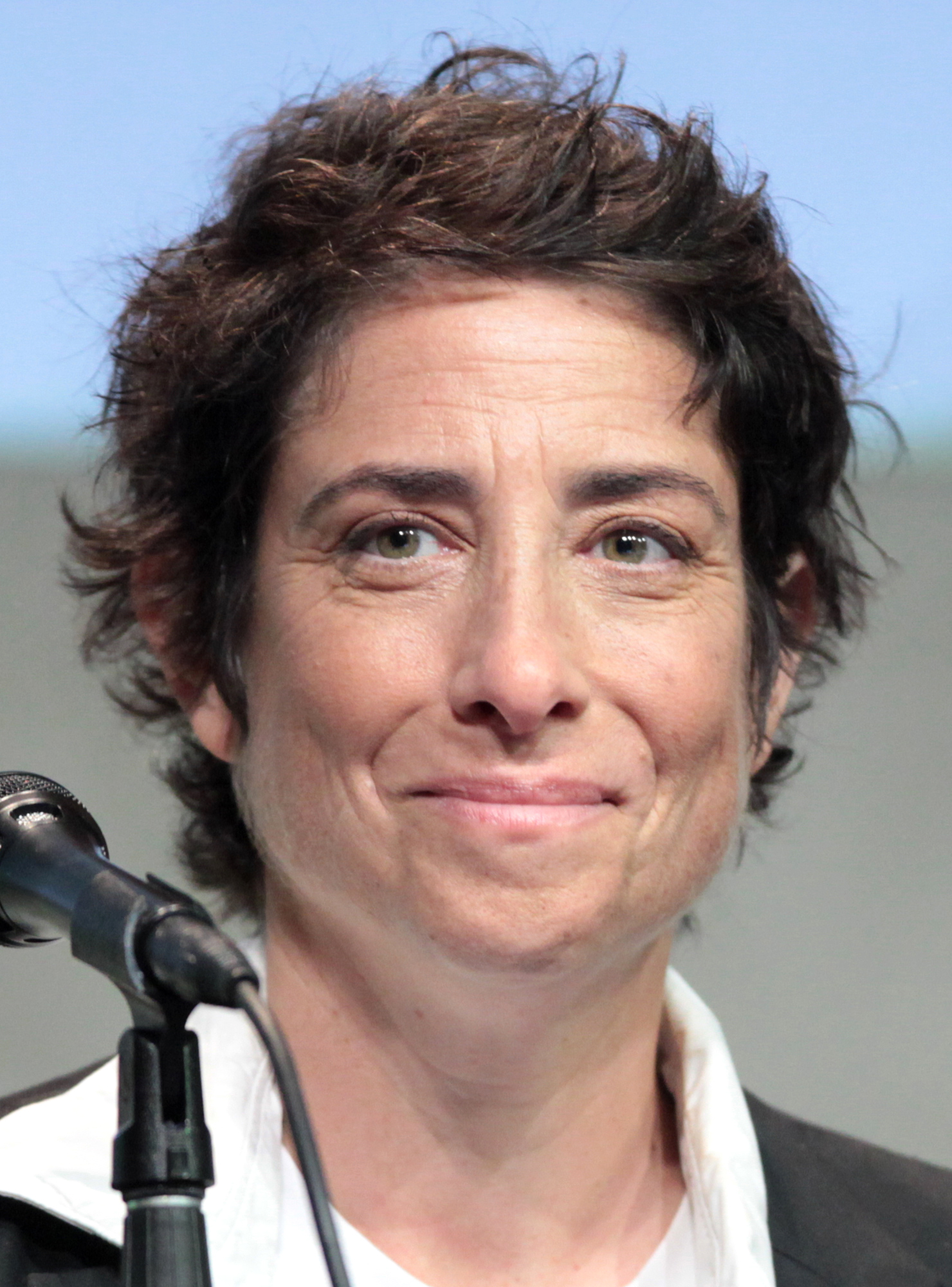
- Strauss in July 2015
- Born: July 13, 1963 (age 63); Scarsdale, New York, U.S.
- Occupations: Producer; executive

Carolyn Strauss (born July 13, 1963) is an American television producer and executive. She was promoted to HBO's head of original programming in 1990 and commissioned widely successful HBO series such as The Sopranos, The Wire, Six Feet Under, Curb Your Enthusiasm, and Sex and the City. After 10 months as president of HBO's entertainment division, she left the position to focus on her producing career in 2008; she was given a production deal with HBO and has since served as an executive producer on series such as Treme, Game of Thrones, Luck, and The Last of Us.

== Early life ==
Carolyn Strauss was born to an Ashkenazi Jewish family in Scarsdale, New York, on July 13, 1963. She graduated from Harvard University with a BA in History.

== Career ==
Although she had no intentions of working in television, Strauss started her career as a temp in the documentaries department of HBO's New York City branch in 1986. Within 10 months, she had secured a full-time job there as the assistant to the head of original programming.

In 1990, she was promoted to HBO's head of original programming and moved to Los Angeles, where she later commissioned widely successful HBO series such as The Sopranos, The Wire, Six Feet Under, Curb Your Enthusiasm, and Sex and the City. She was upped to EVP, original programming, in 2002, and entertainment president in 2004. She was the executive producer on the HBO's Deadwood movie.

After 10 months of serving as president of HBO's entertainment division, she left the position to focus on her producing career in 2008. In 2006, she bought David Benioff and D.B. Weiss’ pitch for a TV series adaptation of George R. R. Martin’s book series A Song of Ice and Fire and was one of the project’s biggest supporters at the network. She was given a production deal with HBO and has since served as an executive producer on series such as Game of Thrones, Treme, Luck, Somebody Somewhere, and The Last of Us. In 2020, she joined Sister, which has built upon Featherstone’s scripted indie, Sister Pictures.

== Personal life ==
Strauss is gay. She has lived in Los Angeles since 1990.

In August 2015, Strauss and 97 other members of Los Angeles' Jewish community signed an open letter supporting the Iran nuclear deal framework.

== Filmography ==
All credits are as executive producer.

- Treme (2010–2013)
- Game of Thrones (2011–2019)
- Luck (2011–2012)
- The Specials (2014)
- Chernobyl (2019)
- Deadwood: The Movie (2019)
- The Baby (2022)
- Somebody Somewhere (2022–2024)
- The Last of Us (2023–present)

== Accolades ==
| Year | Award | Category | Nominee(s) | Result | Ref. |
|---|---|---|---|---|---|
| 2011 | Primetime Emmy Awards | Outstanding Drama Series | Game of Thrones | Nominated | |
| 2012 | Primetime Emmy Awards | Outstanding Drama Series | Game of Thrones | Nominated | |
| 2013 | Primetime Emmy Awards | Outstanding Drama Series | Game of Thrones | Nominated | |
| 2014 | Primetime Emmy Awards | Outstanding Drama Series | Game of Thrones | Nominated | |
| 2014 | Primetime Emmy Awards | Outstanding Miniseries | Treme | Nominated | |
| 2015 | Primetime Emmy Awards | Outstanding Drama Series | Game of Thrones | Won | |
| 2016 | Primetime Emmy Awards | Outstanding Drama Series | Game of Thrones | Won | |
| 2018 | Primetime Emmy Awards | Outstanding Drama Series | Game of Thrones | Won | |
| 2019 | Primetime Emmy Awards | Outstanding Drama Series | Game of Thrones | Won | |
| 2019 | Primetime Emmy Awards | Outstanding Limited Series | Chernobyl | Won | |
| 2019 | Primetime Emmy Awards | Outstanding Television Movie | Deadwood: The Movie | Nominated | |
| 2022 | Peabody Awards | Entertainment | Somebody Somewhere | Nominated | |
| 2023 | Primetime Emmy Awards | Outstanding Drama Series | The Last of Us | Nominated | |
| 2025 | Primetime Emmy Awards | Outstanding Drama Series | The Last of Us | Nominated | |
