= Star Wars Risk: The Clone Wars Edition =

Board game

Star Wars Risk: The Clone Wars Edition is a form of the board game Risk. The factions represented in the game are the Galactic Republic, led largely by the Jedi, and the Separatists, led by charismatic Count Dooku.

== Equipment ==
The box contains the gameboard, cardboard tokens and plastic tokens. Plastic pieces include dice (5 six-sided, 5 eight-sided) and tokens depicting the armies and Darth Sidious. Cardboard pieces represent other elements of the game being:

- Republic Ships (18),
- Separatist Ships (18),
- Republic Factions Cards (30),
- Separatist Faction Cards (29),
- Turn Reference Cards (17),
- Separatist Tokens (9).

== Board layout ==
The game board consists of zones. Each zone contains a grouping of game squares which represent a planet in the Star Wars Universe. Where planets share a common border, a player may move directly to. There are also squares which allow a player to travel to a planet in a different zone. The zones consist of:

=== Wild Space (3 bonus points) ===
Consists of:

- Felucia
- Raxus Prime
- Mon Calamari
- Jabiim
- Saleucami
- Boz Pity
- Kessel

=== Colonies (2 bonus points) ===
- Ithor
- Mygeeto
- Muunilinst
- Dathomir
- Dantooine

=== Mid Rim (5 bonus points) ===
- Sullust
- Haruun Kal
- Kashyyyk
- Rodia
- Ando
- Naboo
- Rattatak
- Kamino
- Nal Hutta

=== Outer Rim (6 bonus points) ===
- Ryloth
- Polis Massa
- Dagobah
- Mustafar
- Tatooine
- Yavin 4
- Utapau
- Geonosis
- Praesitlyn
- Hypori

=== Core Worlds (5 bonus points) ===
- Byss
- Coruscant
- Duro
- Ansion
- Cato Neimoidia
- Corellia
- Alderaan

=== Expansion (3 bonus points) ===
- Ilum
- Malastare
- Toydaria
- Bogden

== Victory conditions ==
Like traditional Risk, players obtain cards for winning battles during the game. If a player takes over an opposing army's territory, that player gets a card at the end of the turn. However, one difference is that if a player takes over at least one territory from each opposing army, that player gets two cards at the end of the turn.

While playing the Clone Wars version, the Republic armies and the Separatist armies have different card decks. When a player draws a card, the card is drawn from the appropriate deck.

Each card has a symbol of a spacecraft on it, as well as a section for special rules.

During gameplay, cards can be played in three different ways:

- A set of 3 cards can be played at the beginning of a player's turn to add more troops to the board before invading. A set consists of 3 cards with a matching symbol (i.e., 3 fighters), or 3 cards each with a different symbol (i.e., a Capital ship, a Corvette, and a Fighter). The number or armies received depends on the type of set turned in.
- A single card can be played in order to put a spacecraft into play (see below). The type of spacecraft built is determined by the symbol on the card.
- A card can be played to use the special text on the card. Each card will specify when it should be played to use the text. Some effects include the ability to add extra reinforcements to a defending territory, remove units from a territory, or alter die rolls during battle.

Some cards have a red colored background, which represent the Jedi Anakin Skywalker. Anakin cards are available to both the Republic and Separatist armies, representing his struggle between the Light and Dark sides of the Force. Once Order 66 is called, however, Republic players cannot use the special text on Anakin cards; they can use the cards only for spacecraft and reinforcements. This represents Anakin's fall to the Dark Side. You can also fortify as many times as you want.

== Spacecraft ==
In addition to the regular troops fighting during battles, players can also add spacecraft to their territories. By a card at the beginning of a player's turn, that player adds a spacecraft to any territory they have under their control. There are three types of spacecraft, and each provides a unique benefit:

- Fighters allow the player to reroll all 1's on a single die. If a player has multiple Fighters on a territory, that player may reroll 1's on multiple dice.
- Corvettes allow the player to add 1 to a single die. If a player has multiple Corvette's on a territory, that player may add 1 to multiple dice. (But may not stack them on the same die).
- Capital ships allow the player to roll an 8-sided die instead of the standard 6-sided die. For each Capital ship on the territory, the player may substitute an 8-sided die during an attack.

Spacecraft can turn the tide of battle, especially when used in conjunction with one another.

Spacecraft are NOT destroyed after use.

== Separatist Leader tokens ==
At the beginning of each Separatist army's turn, the player places a special token face-down onto a space that army controls. These tokens represent the various leaders of the Separatist Army, such as Count Dooku, General Grievous, and Nute Gunray. The Republic player does not know which token represents which leader.

Each token has a number of red dots on the front side. If a Republic player captures a territory containing one of these tokens, at the end of that player's turn the player may draw an extra card for each dot on the tokens captured that turn.

The Separatist Leader Tokens give the Republic a key advantage at the beginning of the game, as they are able to draw cards much faster than the Separatists, which allows them to build their forces more quickly.

Once Order 66 is called, all Separatist tokens are removed from the game, and the Republic player can no longer capture them.

== Order 66 ==
Order 66 is perhaps the most drastic rules variation in the Clone Wars edition. At the beginning of each Separatist player's turn, a Darth Sidious figure is moved along a special track. Each space on the track has a list of numbers from 1 to 8 next to it.

At the end of a Separatist player's turn, once per game, that player may call Order 66. When this happens, the Separatist player rolls an 8-sided die for each of the territories belonging to a Republic player. If the number rolled is in the list of numbers next to the space that Darth Sidious is on, the territory immediately becomes controlled by a Separatist army. The Republic troops and spacecraft are removed and replaced with the same number of troops and spacecraft of either Separatist army (unless one of them was previously eliminated from the game).

After Order 66 is called, the Darth Sidious figure is placed on any territory controlled by either Separatist player. If that territory is ever taken over by the Republic, the Republic wins the game.

This rule represents the manipulations of Darth Sidious. When Order 66 is called, many Clone troopers turn on their Jedi generals, and follow the newly revealed Emperor.

This dynamic can drastically alter the flow of the game. The Republic player could be very close to winning and suddenly find himself having to struggle to survive. However, the decision to call Order 66 must be made carefully. The longer the Separatist players wait before calling it, the more likely it will be for each territory to change control. However, it must be called before the Republic players destroy both Separatist armies. Also, if either Separatist army is completely destroyed, that player's turn is skipped, meaning the Darth Sidious token is moved less quickly.

Finally, since the Darth Sidious token is placed on the gameboard after all territory control changes have been made, it could give the Republic an easy victory. In many situations there are no territories in which the figure can be easily defended, allowing the Republic to take the territory quickly, even if many of their own territories were taken.

== See also ==
- Risk: Star Wars Original Trilogy Edition
- Risk 2210 A.D.
