= Chris Huelsbeck =

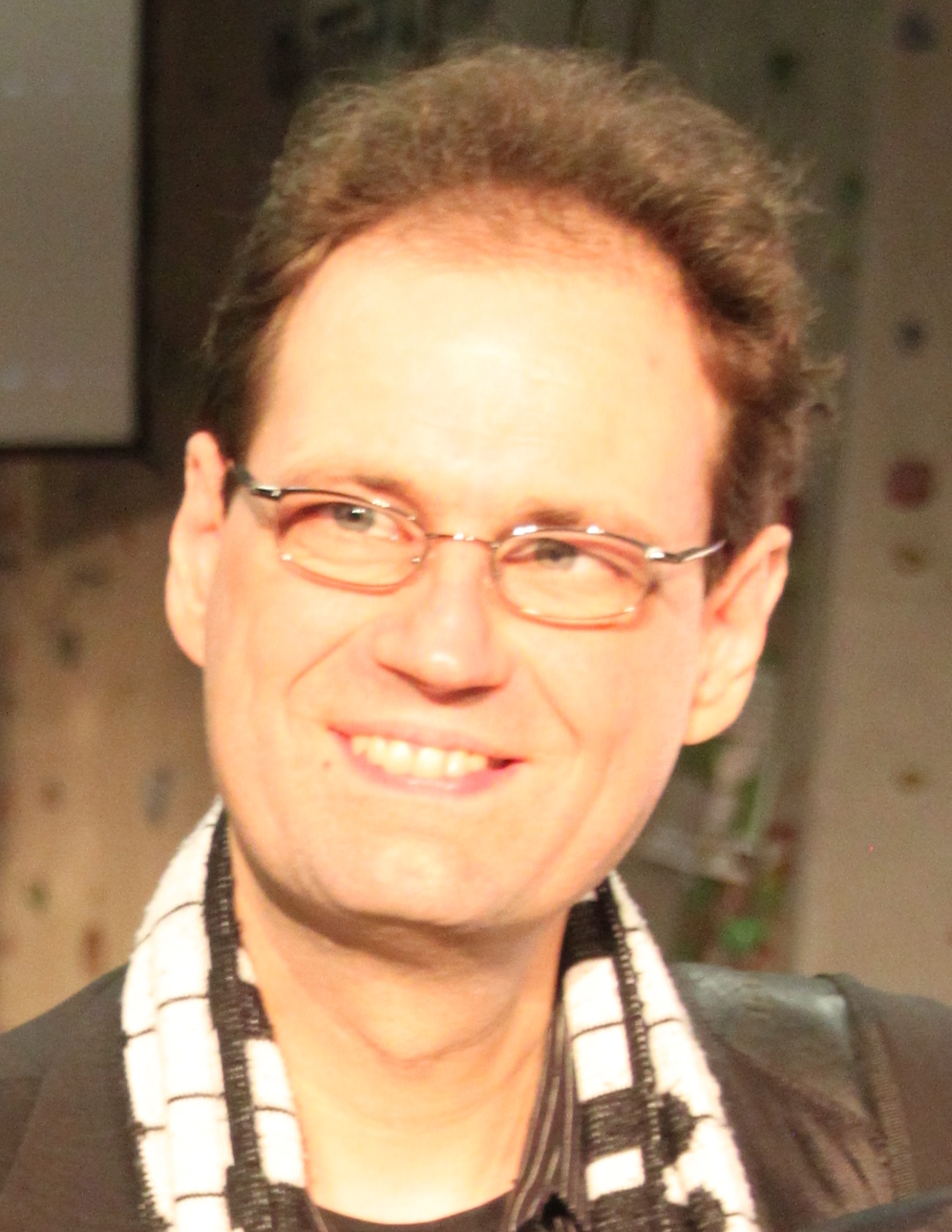
- Huelsbeck in 2011

Background information
- Born: Christopher Hülsbeck; 2 March 1968 (age 58); Kassel, West Germany
- Genres: Electronica, video game music
- Occupation: Composer
- Years active: 1986–present
- Website: Official website

Christopher Hülsbeck (born 2 March 1968), professionally known as Chris Huelsbeck, is a German video game music composer who has worked in the industry since the 1980s. His early work includes music for games such as The Great Giana Sisters and the Turrican series. He later worked on the music for Factor 5 titles such as Star Wars: Rogue Squadron and its sequels.

== Career ==
Huelsbeck's professional career began in 1986, when his composition Shades won a music competition organized by the German computer magazine 64'er. This led to a position at Rainbow Arts, where he composed music for games including The Great Giana Sisters.

Huelsbeck also developed music tools for home computers. In 1986, he published SoundMonitor for the Commodore 64 and later co-created the TFMX ("The Final Musicsystem eXtended") sound editor with programmer Peter Thierolf.

During the early 1990s, Huelsbeck composed music for the Turrican series and co-founded the game developer Kaiko, whose releases included Gem'X and Apidya. In 1998, he moved to the United States to join Factor 5, where he worked on the Star Wars: Rogue Squadron series.

Huelsbeck continued composing in later years, including Giana Sisters: Twisted Dreams (2012), Tiny Thor (2023) and X-Out: Resurfaced (2025).

=== Orchestra performances ===
Huelsbeck's music was performed in the Game Concerts series in Leipzig between 2003 and 2007, including works from Apidya, Turrican II, Turrican 3 and The Great Giana Sisters.

On 23 August 2008, Symphonic Shades was presented in Cologne as a concert devoted entirely to Huelsbeck's music, performed by the WDR Radio Orchestra and the FILMharmonic Choir Prague. It was the first video game music concert to be broadcast live on the radio. In 2009, selections from Symphonic Shades were performed by the Royal Stockholm Philharmonic Orchestra as part of Sinfonia Drammatica, alongside music by Yoko Shimomura.

== Selected video game credits ==
Year	Title	Role
1987	The Great Giana Sisters	Music
1988	Katakis / Denaris	Music
1989	R-Type	Intro music
1990	X-Out	Music
1990	Turrican	Music
1991	Turrican II: The Final Fight	Music
1991	Z-Out	Music
1991	Gem'X	Music
1992	Apidya	Music
1992	Jim Power in Mutant Planet	Music
1993	Mega Turrican / Turrican 3: Payment Day	Music
1993	Super Turrican	Music
1995	Super Turrican 2	Music
1996	Tunnel B1	Music
1997	Extreme Assault	Music
1998	Star Wars: Rogue Squadron	Music
2000	Star Wars Episode I: Battle for Naboo	Music
2001	Star Wars Rogue Squadron II: Rogue Leader	Music direction
2003	Star Wars Rogue Squadron III: Rebel Strike	Music direction
2012	Giana Sisters: Twisted Dreams	Music
2013	Doctor Who: Legacy	Music and production
2017	Bubsy: The Woolies Strike Back	Music
2019	Fade to Silence	Music
2023	Tiny Thor	Music
2023	Interstellar Sentinel	Music
2025	X-Out: Resurfaced	Music
2026	Apidya Special	Music

== Selected discography ==
Year	Title	Notes
1991	Shades	Album
1992	Apidya Soundtrack	Soundtrack
1992	To Be On Top	Album
1993	Turrican Soundtrack	Soundtrack
1997	Tunnel B1 Soundtrack	Soundtrack
1997	Extreme Assault Soundtrack	Soundtrack
2000	Merregnon Soundtrack, Volume 1	Composer, one bonus track
2004	Merregnon Soundtrack, Volume 2	Composer, two tracks
2008	Symphonic Shades	Orchestral album
2013	Turrican Soundtrack Anthology	Soundtrack anthology
2014	GEM'X Extended Soundtrack	Soundtrack
2017	Turrican – Orchestral Selections	Orchestral album
2023	Tiny Thor Soundtrack	Soundtrack
2024	Interstellar Sentinel Soundtrack	Soundtrack
2025	X-Out: Resurfaced (Original Video Game Soundtrack)	Soundtrack
