= Super Turrican 2 =

1995 video game

- North American cover art
- Developer: Factor 5
- Publisher: Ocean Software
- Producer: Julian Eggebrecht
- Designers: Julian Eggebrecht, Lutz Osterkorn, Nils Meier
- Artists: Frank Matzke, Tobias J. Richter, Andreas Escher
- Composer: Chris Huelsbeck
- Platform: SNES
- Release: EU: May 1995; NA: November 1995
- Genre: Run and gun
- Mode: Single-player

Super Turrican 2 is a run and gun video game developed by Factor 5 and published by Ocean Software in 1995 for the Super Nintendo Entertainment System. Part of the Turrican series, it is the sequel to Super Turrican for the same platform.

The game was released on the Virtual Console in North America on September 29, 2008. However, it was retired without any explanation in October 2013 in the same region. It was also re-released as an aftermarket cartridge for the original SNES console in 2022, also including a score attack level for Super Turrican.

== Story ==
The location is a small star system floating in the endless spiral arms of a black hole. Little do the inhabitants of the planets know about the menacing hordes of The Machine. Fleeing through the outer regions of the known galaxy, the villain found his next victims. Long since his last defeat, The Machine has returned and the defenses of the star system are no match for The Machine's phasers launched from deep space. Civilizations were destroyed in an instant and the whole system fell under the spell of evil, with just a few tiny cries for help escaping the boundaries of the system.

In the U.S.S. Avalon, flagship of the United Freedom Forces, the heroes of many rescued souls are restlessly waiting for the final encounter with their longtime arch-enemy. As the sirens yell across the hangar, three ships blast off into the unknown. Ready to face their final challenge, the ships prepare to enter a black hole in order to reach the attacked system. But seconds later, only one of the ships manage to escape the dangerous influence of the black hole.

Badly damaged and burning, the ship hurtles towards a devastated dune world. Shipwrecked somewhere in this devastated realm is the last remaining survivor of the assault squad team sent by the United Freedom Forces. Equipped with his Turrican assault suit, he has to face alone the attempt to stop The Machine's plan to transform the devastated galaxy into his new army stronghold.

== Gameplay ==
Super Turrican 2 features more straightforward shooting action and uses Dolby Pro-Logic surround sound as well as many "Mode 7" effects, but sacrifices the big levels of the original Turrican games by playing more similar to Konami's Contra series. The major addition is a grappling arm, similar to that used in Capcom's Bionic Commando, which can be used to swing between platforms and grab power-ups.

The game features different vehicles such as a desert dune buggy, a space motorcycle and an underwater motojet.

== Reception ==
Reception

Review scores
Publication	Score
Consoles +	89%
Computer and Video Games	90/100
GameFan	92/100, 90/100, 90/100
GamesMaster	85%
Joypad	91%
M! Games	86%
Mega Fun	85%
Official Nintendo Magazine	88/100
Player One	90%
Superjuegos	91/100
Super Play	84%
Total!	(UK) 91/100 (DE) 1-
Video Games (DE)	85%
Games World	86%
Nintendo Acción	89/100
Play Time	85/100
Super Gamer	92/100
VideoGame Advisor	C+

Super Turrican 2 garnered generally favorable reception from critics. GamePro's Mike Weigand applauded the game's varied battlefield settings, "flawless" controls, "stunning" visuals, powerful explosions, and strong soundtrack.

IGN ranked the game at 93rd in their "Top 100 SNES Games of All Time." Upon rerelease to the Wii Virtual Console, IGN reviewed it 7.5/10 in retrospect. In 1995, Total! rated the game 59th on its Top 100 SNES Games writing: "The original C64 Turrican games were a bit ropey but this is a classic blaster in every way."
