= Katakis =

1987 video game

- Developers: Rainbow Arts; Factor 5 (Amiga)
- Publisher: Rainbow Arts
- Programmer: Manfred Trenz (C64)
- Composer: Chris Huelsbeck
- Platforms: Commodore 64, Amiga
- Release: 1987
- Genre: Scrolling shooter
- Modes: Single-player, Multiplayer

Katakis is a horizontally scrolling shooter developed for the Commodore 64 by Rainbow Arts in 1987, and converted to the Amiga by Factor 5 in 1988. It was re-released as Denaris in 1989. The name Katakis has a Greek origin and was found in a phone book in Gütersloh, Germany. The name Denaris was created by a random name generator, and by coincidence, matches a Greek name as well.

== Plot ==
The game takes place on the planet Katakis, a human colony in deep space. There, scientists developed machinery with advanced artificial intelligence capabilities. However, the machines eventually evolved beyond the control of their human creators and overtook the planet. The humans attempted to retaliate through the use of nuclear ballistic missiles, but the machines survived.

The colonists' remaining plan is to use a series of DS-H75 Eagle Fighter space gliders to attack the machines and retake the planet.

== Gameplay ==
C64 battle scene

Katakis has a very similar theme as the game R-Type, with multiple levels, power-ups and various end-bosses. Players must eliminate enemy opponents to reach various end-bosses. One major innovation is the fact that the two-player mode features the second player controlling the Force module. This creates an unusual play strategy of the attacker and the defender, since the main ship is vulnerable to enemy fire and hazards.

== Controversy ==
Due to the game's obvious similarity to R-Type, rights holder Activision Europe delivered an ultimatum: either Factor 5 accept a contract to perform the official R-Type conversion for the Amiga home computer, or receive a lawsuit for rights infringement. According to Julian Eggebrecht, this was because "Activision couldn't find any programmers" but the opportunity was "a dream come true".

== Legacy ==
Factor 5 released the Amiga version of Katakis as freeware as follows:

Katakis, R-Type and BC KID are not provided for the public domain. You are entitled to download and use these games only for non-commercial purposes. All copyrights are retained by their owners. Any distribution of this data through any medium unless specifically permitted by the copyright owners is not allowed.

In Turrican II (also designed by Manfred Trenz) there are references to the Commodore 64 version of Katakis. At the end of level 2-2, the main character takes off in a fighter resembling the one from Katakis. During the take-off sequence, the fighter's drone pod can also briefly be seen, hanging from the ceiling. From that point, and for the whole world 3 duration, the game turns from a platform shooter to a scrolling shooter. There is also an easter egg: before level 3-2's end boss, a Katakis bonus container ship appears. If shot down, it reveals a "question mark" (?) bonus (unique in the whole Turrican II game map) that, if picked up, makes a helicopter walker robot appear, towing a banner with "KATAKIS LIVES!!!" written on it. The Super NES video game Super Turrican is also set on a planet called Katakis. Turrican II also shares numerous graphical assets with Katakis, such as the H. R. Giger inspired backgrounds in both game's final levels.
