= Star Wars Rogue Squadron II: Rogue Leader =

2001 video game

- North American box art
- Developers: Factor 5; LucasArts
- Publisher: LucasArts
- Director: Julian Eggebrecht
- Producer: Brett Tosti
- Artist: Paul Topolos
- Composers: Chris Hülsbeck; John Williams (themes)
- Series: Star Wars: Rogue Squadron
- Platform: GameCube
- Release: NA: November 18, 2001; EU: May 3, 2002
- Genres: Action, arcade flight
- Mode: Single-player

Star Wars Rogue Squadron II: Rogue Leader is a flight action game developed by Factor 5 and LucasArts and published by LucasArts for the GameCube. The second installment of the Rogue Squadron series, it was released as a launch title for the console in North America on November 18, 2001, Europe on May 3, 2002, and Australia on May 17, 2002. Set in the fictional Star Wars galaxy, the game spans all three original trilogy Star Wars films. The player controls either Luke Skywalker or Wedge Antilles. As the game progresses, Skywalker, Antilles and the Rebel Alliance fight the Galactic Empire in ten missions across various planets.

The game received critical acclaim from critics who praised the game's graphics, sound and gameplay, though the lack of multiplayer was criticised. The third and last game in the series, Star Wars Rogue Squadron III: Rebel Strike, was released in 2003 for the GameCube.

== Gameplay ==
Rogue Leader's levels include Star Wars movie moments, such as Return of the Jedi's Battle of Endor.

Similar to its predecessor, Star Wars: Rogue Squadron, Rogue Leader is a fast-paced, flight action game. Each of the game's ten levels introduces mission objectives such as search and destroy or protection that must be completed to progress to the next level. Enemy aircraft are primarily composed of TIE fighters, Imperial shuttles and Star Destroyers. Ground defenses are more varied and include three different walkers, various laser turrets, probe droids and stormtroopers.

The heads-up display features a health meter, a radar, an ammunition count for secondary weapons and the "command cross" that allows the player to give limited instructions to their wingmen via the GameCube controller's D-pad. The player can control seven craft in the base game: X-wing, A-wing, Y-wing, B-wing, Snowspeeder, the T-16 Skyhopper and the Millennium Falcon. Each vehicle offers a unique armament arrangement, as well as varying degrees of speed and maneuverability. The game initially restricts the player to a particular craft for each level; however, after a level has been completed, it can be replayed with any available craft. Some levels offer the player the option to change craft mid-level. Eleven bonus power-ups are hidden in different levels throughout the game. These bonuses improve a craft's weapons, durability, and targeting computer and are applied to each eligible craft for the remainder of the game.

The player's performance is measured throughout the game, and performance statistics are checked after each level against three medal benchmarks. Each benchmark contains six categories: completion time, number of enemies destroyed, shot accuracy, number of friendly craft and structures saved, number of lives lost and targeting computer efficiency. If a player's performance meets or exceeds one of the level's three benchmarks in all six categories, a medal—bronze, silver or gold—is awarded on completion. Acquiring these medals promotes the player's rank and helps unlock hidden content. Once the player completes all of the training missions and achieves gold medals on all 15 levels, the opportunity to activate "Ace Mode" is awarded. The player may then achieve one more medal per level by completing them with this mode activated.

=== Unlockable content ===
Rogue Leader includes a number of unlockable secrets. The player can unlock five bonus levels. Two of these levels allow the player to pilot the Millennium Falcon, while two others allow the player to fight against the Rebel Alliance as Darth Vader. The fifth unlockable level is the tech demo that Factor 5 produced to be exhibited at Nintendo's Space World trade show in 2000. These levels can be obtained after the player obtains enough points accumulated via the game's medal system. Alternatively, they can be unlocked via password. Several craft are also available when unlocked. The Millennium Falcon, the TIE advanced, an Imperial shuttle and the Slave I may be selected after the player meets or exceeds various medal requirements or enters the corresponding passwords. A Naboo Starfighter and a TIE fighter may also be selected after the player completes in-game tasks dependent on the time as dictated by the GameCube's real-time clock. A playable model of a 1969 Buick Electra 225 based on a car owned by the game's sound designer, Rudolph Stember, can be unlocked via password only.

== Synopsis ==
=== Setting ===
Star Wars Rogue Squadron II: Rogue Leader is set in the fictional Star Wars galaxy, where a war is fought between the Galactic Empire and the Rebel Alliance. The game spans all three original trilogy Star Wars films: A New Hope, The Empire Strikes Back and Return of the Jedi. Young pilots Luke Skywalker and Wedge Antilles have recently joined the Alliance to help defeat the Empire and restore freedom to the galaxy.

=== Plot ===
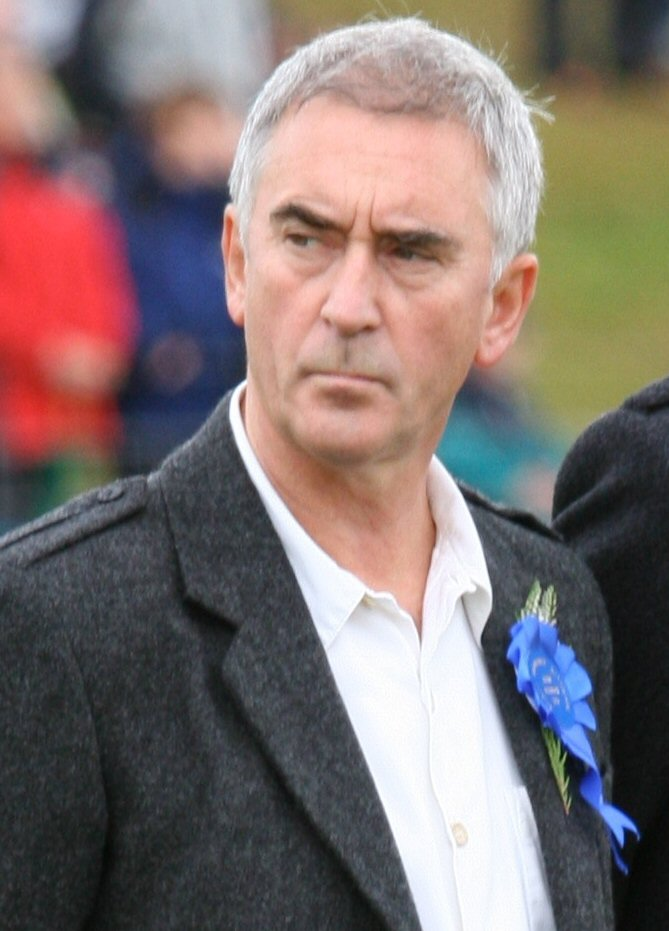
Denis Lawson, who portrayed Wedge Antilles in the Star Wars films, recorded new lines for the game.

The game opens with an opening crawl resembling those featured in the Star Wars films. Further story details are presented through the game's instruction manual, pre-mission briefings, character conversations during the game, in-game cutscenes and movie clips lifted directly from Star Wars films. The game begins with the Rebel Alliance launching an attack on the Death Star, the Galactic Empire's largest space station. In a reenactment of A New Hope's climactic battle, Luke Skywalker destroys the Death Star after firing into an exhaust port.

Skywalker and Wedge Antilles then accompany a rebel supply convoy from Yavin IV to Hoth. When attempting to rendezvous with a second convoy in the Ison Corridor, they discover that the convoy has been destroyed and are ambushed. After fighting off the attack, the rebels continue on to Hoth. As depicted in The Empire Strikes Back, Imperial forces locate the rebel base on Hoth and begin an invasion. Despite Skywalker crash-landing, Rogue Squadron is able to hold off the Imperial attack force long enough for the Rebel base to sufficiently evacuate.

A secret Imperial installation is then located in The Maw. As the Antilles-led Rogue Squadron approaches the base, they receive a transmission from a prisoner who identifies herself as Karie Neth, a rebel who was taken prisoner after the Battle of Hoth. Neth informs Rogue Squadron that she and a few others have escaped from the prison, but need help freeing the remaining Rebel prisoners. By providing cover fire, Rogue Squadron is able to successfully escort the prisoners out of the base. Skywalker then obtains data important to the rebellion, and Rogue Squadron is asked to escort the blockade runner carrying the data to rebel high command. However, the blockade runner is captured by an Imperial Star Destroyer while orbiting Kothlis. After the rebels disable the Star Destroyer, it crashes on Kothlis and Crix Madine retrieves the data.

The Alliance soon discovers that the Empire is constructing a second Death Star near Endor. With the help of Madine, Antilles infiltrates the Imperial Academy on Prefsbelt IV and steals an Imperial shuttle needed to get close enough to destroy a shield generator on Endor. The rebel fleet then begins to assemble near Sullust but needs tibanna gas for its weapons. Lando Calrissian points the rebels to his former tibanna-mining operation near Cloud City on Bespin. Rogue Squadron raids the now-Imperial-controlled facility and secures the gas supply.

In a reenactment of Return of the Jedi's climactic space battle, the Alliance then launches its attack on the second Death Star. When they arrive, however, Han Solo has not yet disabled the Death Star's shield generator on Endor and the Alliance is forced to engage the Imperial fleet until the generator is destroyed. Once the space station is vulnerable, Calrissian and Antilles fly into the Death Star and destroy its power generator, destroying the entire structure.

== Development ==
Developer Factor 5 decided to create a direct sequel to their most successful game to date—Star Wars: Rogue Squadron—when Nintendo approached them about its upcoming new video game console, the GameCube, in the summer of 2000. When they received the early prototype hardware, Factor 5's development team was working on Star Wars Episode I: Battle for Naboo. With LucasArts' approval, the team immediately began developing a tech demo to exhibit at Space World, a Nintendo-hosted trade show. Eggebrecht successfully negotiated with Nintendo that if he was able to ship the game on schedule as a launch title for the console, he could borrow Nintendo of America's only Sky Skipper cabinet for his company's arcade due to the game's elusive nature. In 19 days, Factor 5 produced an introductory cutscene that emulated a scene from A New Hope and a playable demo to premier alongside Nintendo's GameCube hardware at the show.

According to GameSpot, the cutscene "wowed audiences", and IGN described the demo as "drop-dead gorgeous". After the Space World demo, an artist continued working on the 3D models for the player craft in anticipation of the full game's production while the rest of the development team continued to work on Battle for Naboo and Indiana Jones and the Infernal Machine until late 2000. According to the game's director, Julian Eggebrecht, Rogue Leader's development was in jeopardy after the Space World trailer was unveiled. A LucasArts development team working on Star Wars: Starfighter, unaware of Rogue Leader before the reveal, attempted to stop its development to prevent it from possibly overshadowing Starfighter and Microsoft offered LucasArts incentives to move the game to their new console, Xbox.

[Rogue Leader's development period] was the most hectic nine months of my life

— Factor 5 software engineer Dean Giberson

In late December 2000, the core development team met with Eggebrecht and producer Brett Tosti to start planning the game engine. According to Eggebrect, when Factor 5 was developing Rogue Leader, they had access to an early prototype of the GameCube controller that incorporated motion controls. He believed that motion controls worked well for the game's style of gameplay in terms of flight, but when Nintendo decided not to incorporate motion controls into the system, the idea was abandoned. Full-time development of Rogue Leader began in January 2001. The game was scheduled to release simultaneously alongside the GameCube hardware as a launch title in September 2001. The planned nine-month development cycle was extremely short by industry standards, and it has been estimated that a game such as Rogue Leader could typically take 15 to 24 months to produce. Because of this abbreviated production schedule, the game required every development resource available during its entire production. According to technical lead engineer Thomas Engel, "it wasn't long into the project before six- or seven-day weeks became the absolute norm for everybody on the team." Software engineer Dean Giberson recalls that the project was "the most hectic nine months of [his] life".

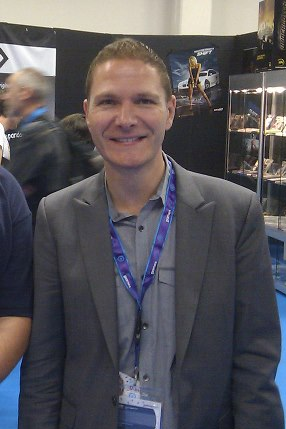
Factor 5's Julian Eggebrecht was the game's director.

As with Rogue Squadron and Battle for Naboo, Rogue Leader was again co-developed by Factor 5 and LucasArts, however this time the bulk of the game's development was done by Factor 5. Their in-house development team consisted of 25 people plus two freelance employees. One level designer as well as the game's lead artist were employed by LucasArts. The art team was unable to use the computer generated film models from visual effects studio Industrial Light & Magic (ILM) as they were constructed using NURBS and it was not practical to convert them to the polygonal models necessary for game development. Instead, high-polygon models of the playable craft were created using Maya, in-house tools, and usable art pulled from archives. During the early stages of development, the new and highly detailed 3D model of the X-Wing was created and perfected in approximately a month. However, toward the end of the project, new ship models were being produced in about a week because of the time constraints. The team's artists referenced Star Wars movies, reference books, and kids' toys in the effort to make the ship models look as realistic as possible. Landscapes were created by applying multiple textures to heightmaps plus bump mapping to add additional detail. The game has three levels of detail; the closer the player comes to objects, the more detailed they become. Draw distance, much improved over the first Rogue Squadron and Battle for Naboo, was drawn out as far as possible. A small amount of haze was deliberately added to create a sense of distance, but not to actually hide the drawing. Additionally, the GameCube's increased processing power allowed the development team to give Rogue Leader's computer-controlled fighters the artificial intelligence (AI) needed to allow them to chase and fly in different formations, unlike the first game, which largely had enemy fighters fly in a predetermined path. AI-controlled flight had to be balanced with creating some predetermined paths, however, to keep the gameplay fun and to not overwhelm the player. By utilizing the GameCube's graphics processing unit's TEV pipeline, Factor 5 was able to create the shader needed to produce the visual effect employed by the game's targeting computer.

Unlike the first Rogue Squadron game that was almost completely set in the Star Wars Expanded Universe, Rogue Leader more closely follows the narrative of the films. Level designers used the trademark battles from the original trilogy as narrative anchors in the game which allowed them to focus on mission design and content creation. To create mission ideas, level designer Albert Chen researched obscure Star Wars lore. By looking "at everything from the Star Wars role-playing books to the radio dramas and even the Marvel comic books and expanded universe stuff", Chen increased his chances of getting missions approved by LucasArts. An in-house level editing tool called L3D was used to design missions. Around since the development of the first Rogue Squadron game, L3D was outdated but Factor 5 did not have the time to program a new level editing tool. It proved instrumental in Rogue Leader's development, however, despite its flaws.

The theme music from Rogue Squadron was re-arranged and used for Rogue Leader. Roughly half of the music featured in the game is John Williams' film score with the other half being new, original music from Factor 5. Sound designers also had access to the LucasArts and Lucasfilm archives, which helped keep the game's audio sound authentic. The developers tried to make the game as close to the movies as possible, studying ILM's special effects, using some of the same sound effects, music and voice acting from the films. The original actor, Denis Lawson, was also hired to record new lines for Wedge Antilles. Having developed the GameCube's MusyX audio system in-house, Factor 5 played an important role in the development of the console's audio hardware and were therefore able to build Rogue Leader's audio on tools they were intimately familiar with. MusyX allowed for seamless blending between streamed and real-time music, giving dynamic sound that could change according to the gameplay. Late in the development process, the team added five-channel surround sound to the game by introducing Dolby Pro Logic II (DPLII) technology into the MusyX system. Rogue Leader was the first game on any platform to use DPLII.

=== Cooperative remake ===
Factor 5 did not have enough time to explore adding a multiplayer mode during development of Rogue Leader because of the short development cycle. When its sequel, Star Wars Rogue Squadron III: Rebel Strike, was released two years later, however, all of Rogue Leader's missions were included in the game only as a two-player cooperative mode. These co-op Rogue Leader levels underwent several changes from the originals. Graphically, Rebel Strike's new, more detailed landscape engine was utilized for any levels set in a planet's atmosphere. The new engine better simulates how light scatters in an atmosphere and allowed for more particle effects. Game models also feature more polygons. Additionally, in the original Rogue Leader, Factor 5 used a simple texture to simulate water. In the Rebel Strike release, water physics were simulated in real-time in conjunction with complex shaders. The gameplay was also reworked in almost all of the missions to better suit co-op, and the difficulty was increased to account for the second player.

== Reception ==
Reception

Aggregate scores
Aggregator	Score
GameRankings	90.04%
Metacritic	90/100

Review scores
Publication	Score
AllGame	4.5/5
Electronic Gaming Monthly	9/10
Eurogamer	9/10
Game Informer	9.5/10
GamePro	5/5
GameRevolution	B+
GameSpot	9.4/10; Editors' Choice
GameSpy	4.5/5
GameZone	9.2/10
IGN	9.1/10; Editors' Choice
Nintendo Life	9/10
Nintendo Power	5/5
The Cincinnati Enquirer	4/5
Playboy	90%

Award
Publication	Award
Game Critics Awards	Best Action Game (2001)

The game was met with critical acclaim, as on GameRankings it holds a score of 90.04%, while the Metacritic score was 90 out of 100. David Trammell of Nintendo World Report gave it nine out of ten and called it "a visual and aural masterpiece. The game has all the bells and whistles you'd expect from a next-generation game including bump mapping and 480p support on the visual end, and five channel surround sound via Dolby Pro Logic II on the aural end." Marc Saltzman of Playboy gave it a score of 90% and stated that, "The combined package of beautiful graphics, intense action (including force-feedback rumble support in the controller!) and familiar Star Wars ditties all work together to create an immersive, outstanding experience from beginning to end." In The Cincinnati Enquirer, he gave the game four stars out of five and stated that, "If there was ever a reason to purchase this compact new console, this is it... [but] there's no multiplayer mode. It would have been fun to fly alongside or against another player in some of the missions." Alex Porter of Maxim gave it a similar score of eight out of ten and said: "More than a Jedi mind trick to make you buy Nintendo's new whiz-bang console, this is the closest a video game has come to recreating a Star Wars movie."

Rogue Leader was among the highest rated GameCube launch titles, and praised for its gameplay and graphics. Official Nintendo Magazine ranked it the 100th best game available on Nintendo platforms. The staff called it an essential launch title for the GameCube. It was a runner-up for GameSpot's annual "Best GameCube Game" and, among console games, "Best Shooting Game" awards. These went respectively to Super Smash Bros. Melee and Halo: Combat Evolved.

Rogue Leader won the E3 2001 Game Critics Award for Best Action Game.

During the 5th Annual Interactive Achievement Awards, Rogue Leader received a nomination for the "Art Direction" award by the Academy of Interactive Arts & Sciences.

=== Sales ===
Rogue Leader was the 7th-best-selling video game in November 2001, the title's debut month. These sale figures made the game the best-selling third-party and second-best-selling overall GameCube game during the console's launch. LucasArts stated that the title had sold faster than any of its previously published games at the time. When both the game and console were launched in the United Kingdom over six months later, the title entered the charts at number one, making it the first ever third-party game to hit the top spot during a console's launch. In May 2003, Nintendo added Rogue Leader to its best-selling Player's Choice collection. Rogue Leader sold 1.03 million copies in the United States, and over 100,000 in the UK.
