= Tunnel B1 =

1996 video game

- European cover art
- Developer: NEON Software
- Publishers: EU: Ocean Software; NA: Acclaim Entertainment
- Designers: Antony Christoulakis; Jan Joeckel; Boris Triebel
- Artists: Andreas Samland; Leif Rumbke
- Composer: Chris Huelsbeck
- Platforms: MS-DOS, PlayStation, Sega Saturn
- Release: October 16, 1996: Saturn; EU: October 16, 1996; NA: January 15, 1997; JP: August 29, 1997 PlayStation; EU: October 19, 1996; JP: October 4, 1996; NA: November 21, 1996 MS-DOS; NA: December 19, 1996; EU: 1996
- Genre: First-person shooter
- Mode: Single-player

Tunnel B1 is a first-person shooter developed by NEON Software and published by Ocean Software in 1996. The soundtrack is by Chris Huelsbeck who also scored Turrican. The PlayStation and Sega Saturn ports were released in Japan as 3D Mission Shooting: Finalist (３Ｄミッション・シューティング ファイナリスト).

== Gameplay ==
The player character travels through a set of precarious tunnels in a high-tech hovercraft. The tunnels are filled with enemy vehicles, choppers and sentry guns which the player has to take out or avoid. Many sections require the player to clear them in a given time limit. The player can upgrade their weaponry.

A complete map of each level can be accessed at any time.

== Development ==
NEON Software began by working on a game which alternated between segments in a hovercraft and segments in a helicopter, both running on the same game engine. Publisher Ocean Software felt the two play styles did not work well together and suggested that they split them into two separate games. The helicopter segments became Viper, while the hovercraft segments became Tunnel B1.

A demonstration at the April 1996 European Computer Trade Show impressed crowds, and Sony Computer Entertainment subsequently purchased the rights to publish Tunnel B1 and Viper for the PlayStation in North America. Ocean later sold the North American publishing rights for all versions of the game to Acclaim Entertainment, stating that they wanted to focus more on development.

Viper saw release in 1998 on the PlayStation in Europe only, being published by Infogrames following their purchase of Ocean. By this time Viper had been reworked to use the P.H.I.G.S. engine and development had been taken over by X-Ample Architectures, a team formed by former members of NEON.

== Reception ==
Reception

Review scores
Publication	Score
Electronic Gaming Monthly	8.5/10, 8.5/10, 7/10, 7/10 (PS)
GameSpot	4.6/10 (PS)
Next Generation	3/5 (PS)
Sega Saturn Magazine	87% (SAT)

Most reviews for Tunnel B1 highly praised the game's visuals, especially the lighting effects. However, most also remarked that the gameplay, while fast-paced and competently designed, is too simplistic and lacking in variety to maintain the player's interest. Some also criticized the low-to-the-ground perspective. A reviewer for Next Generation felt the game could still be worthwhile so long as the buyer didn't expect much from the gameplay, while Scary Larry and Dr. Zombie of GamePro both contended that "a weekend rental" would be sufficient to exhaust what enjoyment the game has to offer, and GameSpot's Jeff Kitts found it too relentlessly boring to merit attention. The four reviewers of Electronic Gaming Monthly instead contended that Tunnel B1 does manage to combine its impressive visuals with flawed but overall fun gameplay. Shawn Smith and Crispin Boyer elaborated that while it does seem repetitious in the early levels, those who persevere will find the game has a satisfying amount of variety. Rich Leadbetter of Sega Saturn Magazine was pleased that, apart from the replacement of the transparencies with meshes, the Saturn conversion is nearly identical to the PlayStation original, and includes some exclusive content to somewhat make up for the loss of transparencies. He summarized the game as "Not the classic it should have been, but pretty solid (if a tad samey) entertainment."
