= Ballblazer Champions =

1997 video game

- Developer: Factor 5
- Publishers: NA: LucasArts; EU: CTO SpA
- Producer: Julian Eggebrecht
- Designers: Brett Tosti; Julian Eggebrecht; Holger Schmidt; Thomas Engel
- Programmers: Holger Schmidt; Thomas Engel; Jens Petersam
- Artists: Mario Wagner; Tobias J. Richter
- Composer: Rudolf Stember
- Platform: PlayStation
- Release: NA: April 2, 1997; EU: October 1997; JP: March 19, 1998
- Genres: Action, sports
- Modes: Single-player, multiplayer

Ballblazer Champions is an action/sports video game released for the PlayStation console. It was developed by Factor 5 and published by LucasArts in North America and by CTO SpA in Europe. It is a remake of the 1985 video game Ballblazer that was released for the Commodore 64 and Atari 8-bit computers.

== Plot ==
A one thousand year feud between four races - the Kraytons, the Mandalars, the Thilibies, and the Zaitecs - is planned to be settled by a Ballblazer knock-out tournament. Each race enters two of their best rotofoil pilots to take part in a series of 1v1 matches with the victor being crowned "Master Ballblazer". The race that wins overall gains control over the galaxy.

== Gameplay ==
The game takes place on an asteroid where an intergalactic BallBlazer competition is taking place, featuring creatures coming from throughout the galaxy. The player selects from one of eight characters, each with their own unique ship called a rotofoil. Each has differing stats in speed, handling, launcher and energy. Players travel around an arena in their rotofoils, armed with various weaponry, similar to the 1975 film Rollerball. The object is to score goals by shooting glowing balls known as "plasmorbs" with the rotofoil into the goal. The winner of each round is the first to score five goals. At the same time, opponents use their weapons to prevent goals from being scored. When a ship has possession of the ball, the energy used to maintain its top speed drains.

== Development ==
At one point the game had been scheduled to be released in the fall of 1996, before it was delayed to early 1997.

== Reception ==
Reception

Aggregate score
Aggregator	Score
GameRankings	64%

Review scores
Publication	Score
AllGame	2.5/5
CNET Gamecenter	8/10
Edge	6/10
Electronic Gaming Monthly	7.125/10
EP Daily	6.5/10
Famitsu	22/40
Game Informer	6.25/10
GameSpot	8.6/10
IGN	6/10
Next Generation	3/5

The game received mixed reviews. In Japan, where the game was ported and published by Bullet-Proof Software on October 23, 1997, Famitsu gave it a score of 22 out of 40.

The game received a wide range of opinions from reviewers. Adam Douglas from IGN said that "For fans of the original game, BallBlazer Champions offers a nostalgic update. But for everyone else, stick to the normal sports." Ward's biggest praise about the game was with the multiplayer mode, which he says adds to the game's replay value. A Next Generation critic similarly described it as "A good one-player game, but even better with two players." Contrarily, GamePro said that "Even though it has an interesting premise, BBC ultimately rockets its way into the 'who cares' bin." (Note: GamePro gave the game 3/5 for graphics, two 2.5/5 scores for sound and control, and 2/5 for overall fun factor.) Shawn Smith of Electronic Gaming Monthly said "The different play modes were fun (my personal favorite being freeplay) and the competition was pretty fierce at times", while his co-reviewer Dan Hsu said that "The choppy and speedy animation combined with the loose controls make the game very difficult to follow, especially in the two-player mode."

The most widely praised aspect of the graphics was the lighting effects. Several critics found the game's sound uninspired. Another common complaint was that the arenas are too large, frequently resulting in situations where the two players simply drive around in isolation from each other.

The game was named the Best Multi-Player Game of the Year in PSExtreme Magazine's 1997 Extreme Awards.
