= Lair (video game) =

2007 video game

- Developer: Factor 5
- Publisher: Sony Computer Entertainment
- Directors: Julian Eggebrecht; Holger Schmidt
- Producer: Brian D. Krueger
- Designer: Brett Tosti
- Artist: Wayne Lo
- Writers: Will Staples; Sean O'Keefe
- Composer: John Debney
- Platform: PlayStation 3
- Release: NA: August 31, 2007; AU: November 15, 2007; EU: November 23, 2007
- Genre: Action-adventure
- Mode: Single-player

Lair is a 2007 action-adventure video game developed by Factor 5 and published by Sony Computer Entertainment for the PlayStation 3.

In Lair, the world is filled with deadly volcanoes, which devastated the world's natural resources and air. It led the native people to split into two warring nations: the poor Mokai, and the well-off Asylia. The story revolves around Rohn Partridge, an Asylia Sky Guard, who eventually turned to support the Mokai. Most of the game's battles are air-based combat, with some fought on the ground by landing the dragon and fighting troops and other land-based creatures. A morale system is also present, in which enemies may retreat if they suffer from low morale.

Lair is the first PlayStation 3 title to have been fully playable via the Remote Play function, allowing it to be accessed through the Internet on a PlayStation Portable. An English demo was released for Asian countries except for Japan, prior to the game's release. The game's soundtrack was composed by John Debney. Lair received mixed reviews upon release, with critics praising the game's visuals and art direction, while criticizing its control scheme. Sony released a reviewer guide to teach reviewers how to properly review the game. Analog stick support and DualShock 3 controller support were later introduced to the game. It was Factor 5's last game developed before its closure in May 2009.

== Gameplay ==
The player assumes the role of a dragon-riding knight named Rohn Partridge. Rohn is given the tasks of defending a certain area, destroying certain objects, eliminating enemies or creatures, and other mission-based objectives. After each stage, the player can earn either gold, silver, or bronze medals, depending on performance during the level. A platinum medal is also available, though unlike the other three its requirements are hidden. Earning medals assists in unlocking combos and behind-the-scenes videos.

Most of the game's battles are air-based combat, with some fought on the ground by landing the dragon and fighting troops and other land-based creatures. In some locations, the game features a morale system tied to the enemy; the lower an enemy's morale, the less he will fight, and it is possible that he will retreat from combat.

The game relies heavily on the PlayStation 3's Sixaxis motion controls. The player flies the dragon by tilting the controller, with additional moves also using motion sensing; one such example is fighting a dragon by tilting the controller to match the enemy dragon's flying height, and then slamming the controller left or right to knock the dragon sideways and out of the battle.

== Plot ==
Lair takes place in a world threatened by numerous emerging volcanoes, causing much of the land to be destroyed and the air to be polluted. As a result, natives divided the world into two kingdoms: the Mokai, whose lands are arid and depleted of resources, and the seemingly noble Asylians, who live in one of the last remaining bountiful, green areas. Desperate to gain the Asylians' land, the Mokai attack the Asylians from the rear. The spiritual leader of the Asylians, the Diviner, preaches that the Mokai are pagans and savages, defying abominations to the will of God, but the Mokai are truly a misunderstood people, hanging on to survival and only attacked the Asylians out of desperation for food (their attacks focused on their granaries).

The game mainly revolves around the pursuits of Rohn (Robin Atkin Downes), one of the Burners (dragon-riders) Sky Guards (the air force-based military). At first Rohn adopts the feeling of hatred towards the Mokai the Asylians have but over the course of the story begins to have more sympathy towards this misunderstood people.

The leader of the Mokai, General Atta-Kai (Fred Tatasciore), approaches the Guardians of Asylia (three individuals with ruling power in Asylia) in peace to ensure the survival of both people. The Diviner (Carlos Alazraqui), in an act to maintain his power over his people, has Loden (Robert Clotworthy), one of the Asylia's Sky Guards assassinate Atta-Kai, one of the guardians and the Sky Guard Captain, Talan (Dorian Harewood), prolonging the war between the two people and capturing Atta-Kai's Blood Dragon in the process. After witnessing the assassinations of both Atta-Kai and Captain Talan, Rohn begins having second thoughts about Asylia's attitude towards the Mokai and releases Atta-Kai's dragon from Loden, thus putting Rohn on thin ice with Loden, the new captain of the Sky Guards.

Loden leads a massive air strike on the Mokai City, bombing the city and attacking what Loden thought to be an armory, but was actually a temple where the women and children had sheltered themselves from the attacks. Rohn is devastated when he discovers the victims and defies Loden, who declares Rohn an enemy of Asylia and delivers near fatal blows to both Rohn and Rohn's Plains Dragon. Rohn's dragon, in an attempt to save Rohn's life, carries him into a desert in Mokai territory but dies in the process from the wound Loden delivered.

Rohn soon reunites with Atta-Kai's Blood Dragon, who adopts Rohn as its new rider. While searching the desert for water, Rohn and the dragon discover the elder of the Mokai, Ren-Kai (Jane Singer), under attack from a Spider Wasp, which the two slay. Ren reveals that some of the Mokai managed to survive the bombings and are hiding out in the desert and Rohn helps protect them from Asylian attacks. Ren, knowing that the Mokai people need a new leader, asks Rohn to rescue General Atta-Kai's son, Koba-Kai (Crispin Freeman), who is imprisoned in Asylia. Both Rohn and Koba-Kai defend the Mokai people from further attacks and acquire a small fleet of Asylian ships. The Mokai launch an attack on the Asylians and reclaim Mokai City. After the battle a group of Asylian Burners arrive and submit themselves to the Mokai. Among them is Jevin (Raphael Sbarge), Rohn's best friend, who informs Rohn that the remaining two Guardians were executed by the Diviner and that some of the Sky Guard had defected from the Diviner's rule over Asylia and were imprisoned in the Maelstrom (an Asylian prison situated within a dimensional vortex).

Knowing they would need reinforcements, Rohn and Koba-Kai lead an attack on the Maelstrom to free the Burners imprisoned there. During the rescue Rohn battles Loden, who rides a powerful species of gorilla-like dragon called the Bull Dragon. Loden attempts to kill the fleeing prisoners by flinging enormous boulders from the Maelstrom's gravitational pull onto the prison but Rohn intervenes and kills Loden and succeeds in rescuing the imprisoned burners. The combined forces of Mokai and defected Burners charges towards Asylia, battle the Diviner's forces, prevent the volcanoes from erupting and kill the Diviner. During the battle Koba-Kai is shot down by the Diviner's forces. After the battle Rohn finds him and Koba-Kai comments on how beautiful the sunsets in Asylia are, Rohn goes on to say that the new world that the Asylians and Mokai were to build together would never be the same, to which Koba-Kai replied "Let us hope not," before dying. Rohn asks Atta-Kai's Blood Dragon to carry Koba-Kai's body home, afterwards Ren approaches Rohn and tells him that his people are waiting.

== Development ==
Lair is the first PlayStation 3 title to have been playable via the Remote Play function, allowing it to be accessed through the Internet on a PlayStation Portable. Though not fully playable, as motion sensor controls are not available on PSP. The machine lacks L2 and R2 buttons and a right analog stick, which are necessary to pass certain levels. Initially the game was a Wii tech demo.

On April 15, 2008, an update was released on the PlayStation Network, adding analog stick support, extra playable dragons, and rumble support for the DualShock 3 controller. The game now uses the directional pad for actions such as the 180 degree turn and the "dash forward" ability.

An English-language demo for Lair was made available to Asian markets only, excluding Japan, in April 2008. Even though the Lair Trial Version includes the gameplay patch, it is not compatible with the Remote Play function.

The developers would later admit to a troubled development process many years later.

== Soundtrack ==
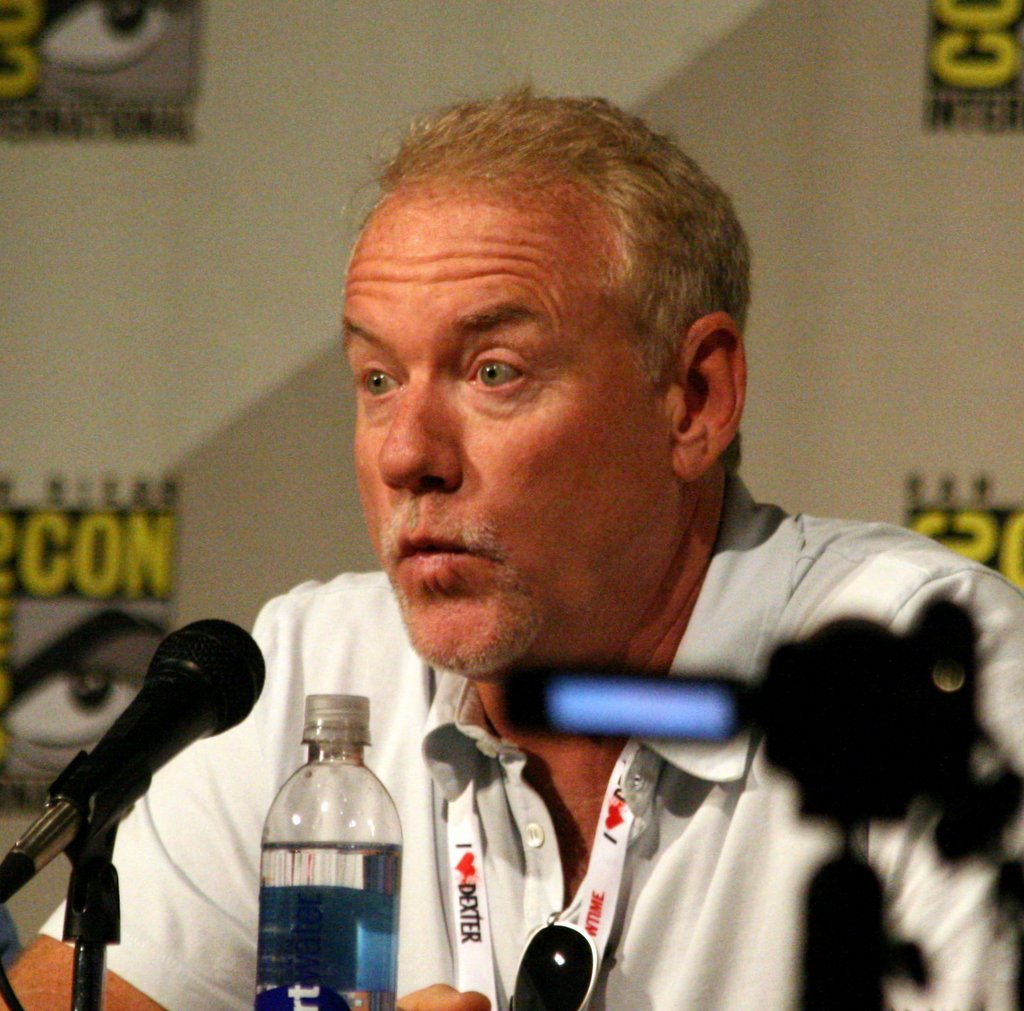
John Debney composed the game's score.

John Debney was hired to write the soundtrack for Lair with Kevin Kaska composing the additional music. Debney has had experience writing music for epics, but Lair is his first video game soundtrack. The score was performed with a 90-piece orchestra at Abbey Road Studios in London. Lair's soundtrack received critical acclaim, with some calling it "one of the strongest of video game scores." A review on Tracksounds gave the soundtrack a score of 10/10, the highest possible score. ScoreNotes.com also reviewed the soundtrack and gave it a full score. Several critics also compared the tracks to some of the works in Star Wars: Episode I – The Phantom Menace by John Williams. Debney stated that he was interested in writing music for a video game after seeing the work in Medal of Honor by Michael Giacchino. The score was released as a limited edition 2 CD-set on April 8, 2014 by La-La Land Records.

== Reception ==
Reception

Aggregate score
Aggregator	Score
Metacritic	53/100

Review scores
Publication	Score
Edge	3/10
Electronic Gaming Monthly	5.5/10
Eurogamer	4/10
Famitsu	33/40
Game Informer	7.25/10
GamePro	3.75/5
GameRevolution	C−
GameSpot	4.5/10
GameSpy	1.5/5
GameTrailers	6/10
GameZone	7.5/10
IGN	4.9/10
PlayStation: The Official Magazine	5/10
411Mania	2.5/10

During development, Lair gained attention due to its graphical presentation and developer Factor 5's reputation. However, upon release, it was seen as a critical and commercial failure. It received "mixed or average" reviews according to the review aggregation website Metacritic. The only reviewer that gave it a high score was Japan's Famitsu, which gave it a score of 9, 7, 8, 9 for a total of 33 out of 40. Although the game was praised for its graphics, artwork, storytelling, soundtrack, and sound quality, it was also heavily criticized for its control scheme. In 2010, GameTrailers placed the game 7th in their list of the "Top 10 Most Disappointing Games of the Decade".

Sony attracted criticism from video game blogs by mailing review websites a "Lair Reviewer's Guide" following negative reviews of the game. It is common practice to post a fact sheet with review copies of a game, but this guide was mailed separately, and after negative reviews of the game had been published by the website. As well as providing a 21-page booklet containing artwork, background story, and six pages of instructions regarding the game's control system, the booklet invited reviewers to "Open your mind and hands for something very different."

Despite the mixed reception, John Debney's strong musical score enticed the Academy of Interactive Arts & Sciences into nominating Lair for "Outstanding Achievement in Original Music Composition" during the 11th Annual Interactive Achievement Awards.
