= Psycho-Nics Oscar =

1987 video game

- Developer: Data East
- Publisher: Data East
- Designer: Akira Sakuma
- Programmer: Satoshi Imamura
- Artists: Harumi Nomura; Jun Matsuda; Masayuki Kawaguchi
- Composers: Azusa Hara; Hiroaki Yoshida; Hitomi Komatsu
- Platform: Arcade
- Release: JP: August 1987; NA: February 1988
- Genre: Run and gun
- Mode: Single-player

Psycho-Nics Oscar (Note: Japanese: サイコニクス・オスカー, Hepburn: Saiko-Nikusu Osukā; also known as Oscar in North America) is a 1987 run and gun video game developed and published by Data East for arcades. Set in the futuristic Ordio City, players assume the role of the titular mecha to fight against enemy invaders. Headed by Akira Sakuma, the title was developed by most of the same team that would later work on several projects at Data East. It received positive reception since its release from critics and has been cited as an influence for Turrican. The rights to the title are currently owned by G-Mode.

== Gameplay ==
Gameplay screenshot.

Psycho-Nics Oscar is a side-scrolling run and gun game where players assume the role of Oscar to fight against invaders in Ordio City. The controls consists of an eight-way joystick and three action buttons for shooting, jumping and selecting a power-up item. The weapon system is similar to Gradius, where the currently selected power-up items appears highlighted at the bottom of the screen. When a power-up item is highlighted by picking up a "N" capsule, players obtain it by pressing the power-up button but the system returns to its initial state.

Players also have access to satellite options called "P.C.U.", which provides additional firepower for Oscar. Making a full rotation of the weapon system changes the "Gun" power-up to "Armor", giving Oscar an armor to sustain enemy hits while making a full rotation twice provides Oscar a "Quick" rapid fire power-up. A checkpoint system is used to respawn a downed player at the start of a reached checkpoint before dying. Sustaining a number of enemy hits results in losing a live, as well as a penalty of lowering Oscar's power to his original state and the game is over once all lives are lost, unless players insert credits into the arcade machine to continue playing.

== Development and release ==
Psycho-Nics Oscar was created by most of the same team that would later work on several projects at Data East. Its development was helmed by designer Akira Sakuma, who also acted as co-programmer alongside Satoshi Imamura and Takuya Haga. Artists Harumi Nomura, Jun Matsuda, Katsunori Tsujimura, Masayuki Kawaguchi, Tomo Adachi and Yutaka Kadode were in charge of creating the pixel art. The soundtrack was handled by Gamadelic members Azusa Hara, Hiroaki Yoshida, Hitomi Komatsu and Tatsuya Kiuchi. When creating the game, Sakuma thought about how a robot would operate and wanted to introduce more features but they were not implemented due to lack of time.

Psycho-Nics Oscar was first released in Japan by Data East in August 1987 and later in North America in February 1988 by the North American branch of Data East. In 1988, an album containing music from the game and other Data East titles was published exclusively in Japan by G.M.O. Records. The title has since been re-released on the Antstream service in 2019. In September 2020, M2 announced a new version of Psycho-Nics Oscar as part of their M2 ShotTriggers publishing label.

== Reception and legacy ==
In Japan, Game Machine listed Psycho-Nics Oscar on their October 1, 1987 issue as being the fifth most-successful table arcade unit of the month, outperforming titles such as Double Dragon. Oscar got an overall rating of 7 out of 10 by Martin Gaksch of German magazine Power Play. Gaksch saw the game in the tradition of Ghosts 'n Goblins, mentioning the unusual three fire buttons and rated the gameplay as "very good".

According to Factor 5 co-founder Julian Eggebrecht and Manfred Trenz, the game influenced the design of Turrican, which was released in 1989 and featured a more European aesthetic. Ron Alpert of Gamasutra regarded it as "A solid, fun little game which is said to be the inspiration for the much more memorable Turrican..." Kurt Kalata of Hardcore Gaming 101 stated that "While technically Psycho-Nics Oscar blends into the murky miasma of similar arcade titles from the era, it's still a fun little game, however, the kind that, like many, probably would've obtained more popularity had it been ported to a console." The rights to the title are currently owned by G-Mode and the company expressed interest in developing a sequel if an opportunity arises.
