= Mega Turrican =

1993 video game

- European cover art
- Developers: Factor 5 (Mega Drive); Kaiko/Neon Studios (Amiga)
- Publishers: NA: Data East; EU: Sony Imagesoft (Mega Drive); EU: Sega (Virtual Console Wii); EU: Rainbow Arts/Renegade Software (Amiga)
- Designers: Thomas Engel; Frank Matzke; Julian Eggebrecht
- Platforms: Mega Drive/Genesis, Amiga
- Release: Amiga: EU: 1993; Mega Drive/Genesis: NA: March 1994; EU: November 1994; Director's Cut: WW: 2022
- Genre: Run and gun
- Mode: Single-player

Mega Turrican is a run and gun video game developed by Factor 5 in 1993 and published by Data East in 1994. Part of the Turrican series, it was released for the Mega Drive/Genesis, and later followed by an Amiga port converted by Kaiko and Neon Studios under the title of Turrican 3: Payment Day. Despite not being the original, the Amiga version was the one that was first commercially released in 1993, published by Rainbow Arts in Germany and Renegade in the rest of Europe. The Mega Drive version did not have a publisher and stayed unreleased from spring 1993 until 1994, when Data East took over its worldwide distribution. Data East itself released the game in North America, and contracted Sony Imagesoft for the game's distribution in Europe.

The Mega Drive version of the game was re-released on the Wii's Virtual Console service in Europe and Australia on March 22, 2008 and on April 14, 2008 in North America. It was also released once again for the Mega Drive/Genesis in 2022 as Mega Turrican: Director's Cut, an aftermarket cartridge containing the original game, a new variant with some restored content and a score attack level.

== Plot ==
Time has passed since humankind last heard of The Machine. Bren McGuire is on a United Planets Freedom Forces mission when suddenly he sees his worst nightmares come true again. Years ago, he was the only survivor of the starship Avalon 1 when The Machine took out his comrades in an attempt to take over the galaxy. Back then, Bren sought revenge against his enemy and finally destroyed him in the planet of Landorin. Nobody expected a return of The Machine, but now, after many people enjoyed freedom and peace in the galaxy, the dark forces under his command are starting to assemble again.

A wave of terror strikes as The Machine devastates numerous planets and subjugates hundreds of innocent people. The old memories come back to Bren as he hears the message of a beautiful young girl. She appeals for help as her planet is invaded by the troops of The Machine. Donning his Turrican assault suit, Bren makes his final vow for revenge.

Yet again, Bren McGuire, now the leader of the Freedom Forces, becomes the only hope in a crucial mission to ultimately destroy The Machine. A warrior against the evil hordes of The Machine, Bren vaults out of his ship to face the ultimate challenge.

== Gameplay ==
The player has to complete numerous large levels always searching for secrets to pick up and enemies to shoot. To do this, the player can pick up three different, upgradeable shots: a "Multiple" spread gun, a more powerful, single-direction "Laser" and a "Rebound", which fires shots directly up and down that travel along floors and ceilings, while the main forward-firing shot is weaker. He can also go into wheel-mode by pressing jump while holding down on the D-Pad (as long as the player has enough special energy) and use a rope. In wheel-mode, the player is nearly invincible and can lay mines or explore previously unreachable areas, a mechanic similar to the "Morph Ball" from the Metroid series and the "Spin Dash" from the Sonic the Hedgehog series.

The player can also use a grappling hook for the first time in the Turrican series.

== Development ==
The German magazine "Amiga Games" published a complete 6-part development diary (The long way from Turrican II to Turrican III) in 1992. The German magazine "Power Play" published an article about the development of Turrican 3 in 1993.

Factor 5 began the work on Turrican III for the Amiga right after Turrican II was released in 1991. They had a working demo that already had some features from the final game. However, around this time, the Amiga market was already in decline and together with Rainbow Arts, it was decided to develop the game for the Sega Mega Drive instead. The game was completely redesigned for the console and it was co-developed by Factor 5 and members of Kaiko. Development of what was already known as Mega Turrican was finished in spring 1993, but Factor 5 was still lacking a publishing agreement for the title at this point, since Rainbow Arts did not perform direct operations on the console business. Factor 5 had then to shift efforts into presenting the game to various Mega Drive/Genesis publishers in hopes they could sign a definite deal, a process that would end a whole year after when Data East agreed with Factor 5 into publishing Mega Turrican in 1994.

Not long after development of Mega Turrican for the Mega Drive was finished, Kaiko approached Rainbow Arts and asked to develop their own version of a third Turrican game for the Amiga. However, development on this version did not get very far and was stopped after a short time. Efforts on a third Amiga version were once again restarted, this time as a conversion of Mega Turrican, which was still an unpublished title on the Mega Drive/Genesis. The programming was done by Peter Thierolf of Neon Studios, formerly of Kaiko (the company was falling apart at the time). This port for the Amiga, rebranded as Turrican 3 (replacing the Roman numerals that the previous Factor 5 project had assigned), was released in Europe in Autumn 1993 by Rainbow Arts and Renegade Software, even before the original version for the Mega Drive/Genesis could find a publishing company for any region.

The main differences between the Mega Drive and Amiga versions are graphics and sound. Notably, the graphical department of the original Mega Drive version was compromised in the porting process to the Amiga, resulting in slight loss of color, some missing backgrounds, and a general lacking of animations and graphical effects. The music and sound effects were ported to the Amiga sound capabilities with readjustments in various track compositions being made in the process. Not many changes, additions, or cuts were done in gameplay and level design aside from a secret level in the initial world of Mega Turrican becoming a regular level in Turrican 3 and if the user on the Amiga uses a one-button joystick/pad, they have to restore the traditional jumping method back to the up direction and having to hold the fire button in order to use the grappling hook.

In general terms and aside from specific version differences, the game features smaller levels compared to the original Amiga Turrican games, but compensates these with many new effects and graphical improvements, and a major focus on shooting action. The lightning whip from the first two games is gone and is replaced by a physics-driven grappling hook used to reach higher places in a similar fashion to other games like Bionic Commando.

Versions were considered by Rainbow Arts for MS-DOS and Acorn Archimedes for summer 1994, but neither were released.

== Reception ==
Reception

Review scores
Publication	Score	
Publication	Amiga	Sega Genesis
AllGame	N/A	3.5/5
Amiga Action	81%	N/A
Amiga Computing	90%	N/A
Amiga Force	69/100	N/A
Amiga Format	77%	N/A
Amiga Power	62%	N/A
Amiga User International	74%	N/A
Computer and Video Games	87/100	83/100
Edge	6/10	N/A
Electronic Gaming Monthly	N/A	9/10, 8/10, 8/10, 8/10, 8/10
Game Players	N/A	88%
GameFan	N/A	90%, 88%, 90%, 90%
GamesMaster	74/100	77/100
Mean Machines Sega	N/A	89/100
CU Amiga	85%	N/A
Electronic Games	N/A	87%
Mega	N/A	83%
MegaTech	N/A	70/100
Mega Play	N/A	85%, 87%
The One Amiga	79%	N/A
Sega Magazine	N/A	79/100
Sega Power	N/A	87%
Sega Pro	N/A	78%
Sega Zone	N/A	83%
VideoGames	N/A	8/10

Mega Turrican garnered generally favorable reception from critics.

In 2017, GamesRadar+ ranked Mega Turrican 36th on their "Best Sega Genesis/Mega Drive games of all time" list.

=== Amiga ===
Turrican 3 was also met with generally positive reviews.
