= Star Wars Episode I: Battle for Naboo =

2000 video game

- North American cover art
- Developers: Factor 5 LucasArts
- Publishers: Nintendo 64: NA: LucasArts; EU: THQ; Windows: NA/EU: LucasArts
- Director: Brett Tosti
- Producers: Dale Geist; Julian Eggebrecht
- Designer: Duncan Brown
- Programmer: Holger Schmidt
- Artists: Lynne Gura; Chris Doyle
- Composers: Chris Huelsbeck; Jake Jacobson
- Series: Star Wars
- Platforms: Nintendo 64, Windows
- Release: Nintendo 64: NA: December 14, 2000; EU: March 30, 2001; Windows: NA: March 12, 2001; EU: March 23, 2001
- Genres: Action, arcade flight
- Mode: Single-player

Star Wars Episode I: Battle for Naboo (Note: Released on Microsoft Windows as Star Wars: Battle for Naboo) is an arcade-style action game co-developed by Factor 5 and LucasArts. It is a spiritual successor to Star Wars: Rogue Squadron released two years earlier. Despite the similarities between the two games, the development team designed a new game engine for Battle for Naboo and included land- and water-based combat in addition to aerial combat. The player can control various air, land, and water vehicles; each offers a unique armament arrangement, as well as varying degrees of speed and maneuverability. Bonus power-ups that improve these crafts' weapons or durability are hidden in different levels throughout the game. The player's performance is checked against four medal benchmarks after the completion of each level. Acquiring these medals promotes the player's rank and helps unlock hidden content.

Set in the fictional Star Wars galaxy, the game takes place during the events depicted in the film Star Wars: Episode I – The Phantom Menace. The player controls Gavyn Sykes, a lieutenant in Naboo's Royal Security Forces. As the game progresses, Sykes and the Royal Security Forces fight the Trade Federation in 15 missions that take place on Naboo or in the space surrounding it. The game concludes after the player completes a mission that recreates the film's climactic assault on the Trade Federation's Droid Control Ship.

Battle for Naboo was published by LucasArts and THQ and released for the Nintendo 64 in December 2000. A Windows port was released three months later in March 2001. The Nintendo 64 version was heavily compared to Rogue Squadron and received generally positive reviews; critics praised the game's tight and responsive controls, but expressed dislike for the game's Episode I setting. The game's PC port was less well-received, with critics citing poor visuals and difficult controls.

== Gameplay ==
A follow-up to Star Wars: Rogue Squadron, Battle for Naboo is a fast-paced, arcade-style action game. Each of the game's 15 levels introduces mission objectives that must be completed to progress to the next level. Enemy aircraft are primarily composed of Trade Federation Droid starfighters and air mines. Ground defenses are more varied and include battle and destroyer droids, laser and missile turrets, Armored Assault Tanks (AATs), Multi-troop transports (MTTs), gunboats, and Single trooper aerial platform (STAPs).

The heads-up display features a health meter, a radar, and an ammunition count for secondary weapons. Depending on the level, the player can control several different air, land, and water vehicles. Aircraft are the Naboo N-1 Starfighter, the Naboo Bomber, and Police Cruiser, while land and watercraft are the Flash and Gian speeders, the Trade Federation Gunboat, and the Heavy STAP. Each vehicle offers a unique armament arrangement, as well as varying degrees of speed and maneuverability. The game initially restricts the player to a particular craft for each level; however, after a level is completed, it can be replayed with any available craft that falls within its air, land, or watercraft specification. Some levels offer the player the option to change craft mid-level. Seven bonus power-ups are hidden in different levels throughout the game. These bonuses improve a craft's weapons or durability and are applied to each eligible craft for the remainder of the game.

The player's performance is measured throughout the game, and performance statistics are checked after each level against four medal benchmarks. Each benchmark contains six categories: completion time, number of enemies destroyed, shot accuracy, number of friendly craft and structures saved, whether the level's bonus was collected, and lives remaining. If a player's performance exceeds one of the level's four benchmarks in all six categories, a medal—bronze, silver, gold, or platinum—is awarded on completion. Unlike other medal benchmarks, platinum medal benchmarks are undisclosed to the player. Acquiring medals promotes the player's rank and helps unlock hidden content.

=== Unlockable content ===
Battle for Naboo includes a number of unlockable secrets. The player can unlock three bonus levels: "Trade Federation Secrets", "Coruscant Encounter", and "Dark Side". These levels are made available when the player obtains all bronze, silver, or gold medals, respectively, on every level. Alternatively, they can be unlocked via password. Several craft are also available when unlocked. The Sith Infiltrator, a Swamp Speeder, and an AAT may be selected when the player enters the correct passwords or achieves all gold or platinum medals, respectively, on all levels. A playable model of a 1969 Buick Electra 225 based on a car owned by the game's sound designer, Rudolph Stember, can be unlocked via password only.

The development team also included early game design sketches and audio commentary for each of the game's 15 standard levels, unlockable via a password. Each level features more than five minutes of audio that totals over an hour of commentary in all. IGN likened the "captivating" commentary to DVD bonus material and believed the addition could start a trend in video games. MTV reporter Stephen Totilo believes that this audio commentary "may very well be" the earliest in video gaming.

== Synopsis ==
=== Setting ===
Battle for Naboo takes place in the fictional Star Wars galaxy. The overarching conflict is an escalating battle between the Trade Federation and the people of Naboo. All 15 missions occur during the events depicted in Star Wars: Episode I – The Phantom Menace. The taxation of trade routes is in dispute and the Trade Federation has sent an invasion force to the planet's capital city of Theed hoping to capture the planet and steal its resources. The planet's queen, Padmé Amidala, has left the city for Coruscant to try to gain support from the Galactic Senate. To help defend the planet, Lieutenant Gavyn Sykes must form a resistance movement.

=== Plot ===
The game starts with an opening crawl resembling the ones featured in the Star Wars films. Further story details are presented through the game's instruction manual, pre-mission briefings, characters' conversations during the game and in-game cut scenes. During the Trade Federation's initial invasion of Theed, Lieutenant Gavyn Sykes and Captain Kael are able to escape the capital and head into the surrounding farmland. The two attempt to protect civilian farmers, but Federation presence is too strong, and they retreat into the nearby swamps. There they learn of a smuggler hidden in the mountains who might aid them. With the help of farmer Ved Deviss, Sykes and Kael find Borvo the Hutt. Borvo agrees to assist the resistance movement against the Trade Federation after the group helps him escape Federation forces.

In their first strike against the Trade Federation, Kael, Sykes, Ved, Lutin Hollis and Kol Kotha, a mercenary agent of Borvo's, destroy the communications satellite Comm 4. The satellite's destruction temporarily disables a Federation base on the planet, allowing the resistance to successfully attack it and destroy numerous droids and heavy equipment. During the fight, Sykes commandeers a Federation gunboat and uses it to liberate labor camps along the Andrevea River, escorting the freed prisoners to a rendezvous point among ruins to the north.

However, during the escort mission, Kael disappears and Sykes begins a search and rescue mission for the missing Captain. Sykes discovers a mortally wounded Kael near his crashed fighter, and it is revealed that Borvo had shot down Kael after he'd learned of the Hutt's secret plan to sell the escaped prisoners into slavery. Seeking vengeance and the freedom of his people, Sykes hunts down Borvo, assisted by a disgruntled Kotha who disagrees with Borvo's betrayal. Though the Hutt is able to escape to Nal Hutta, the prisoners are saved.

Now in charge of the resistance on Naboo, Sykes leads a mission to liberate the Camp 4, a detention center where the Trade Federation has placed most of Naboo's important leaders. After the camp is freed, Sykes is contacted by Captain Panaka, and the plan to finally liberate Naboo is set in motion. After taking part in the diversionary attack on Theed that allows Queen Amidala and Panaka to infiltrate the Palace and capture Trade Federation Viceroy Nute Gunray, Sykes joins the rest of Bravo Flight in the climactic assault on the Droid Control Ship. Partnered with R2-C4, Sykes knocks out the Droid Control Ship's Shield Generator, which allows young Anakin Skywalker to destroy the ship from within. With the Trade Federation army disabled, Naboo is freed.

== Development ==
With Star Wars: Rogue Squadron and Star Wars Episode I: Racer already released under a three-game exclusivity agreement signed by Nintendo, LucasArts began planning for the third and final game. After the success of Rogue Squadron in 1998, LucasArts and Factor 5 started initial testing for a follow-up in February 1999. The team discussed how they could build on that success and began planning the development of a new game engine. Possible plot ideas involving the film Star Wars: Episode I – The Phantom Menace were also discussed. After it was released in May 1999, the team watched the movie several times in an attempt to find interesting characters, situations and craft for the game. Factor 5 stated that tying a movie plot into a vehicle combat game was "hard". They included all the characters and vehicles from the movie they could, and attempted to mix these elements with entirely new content.

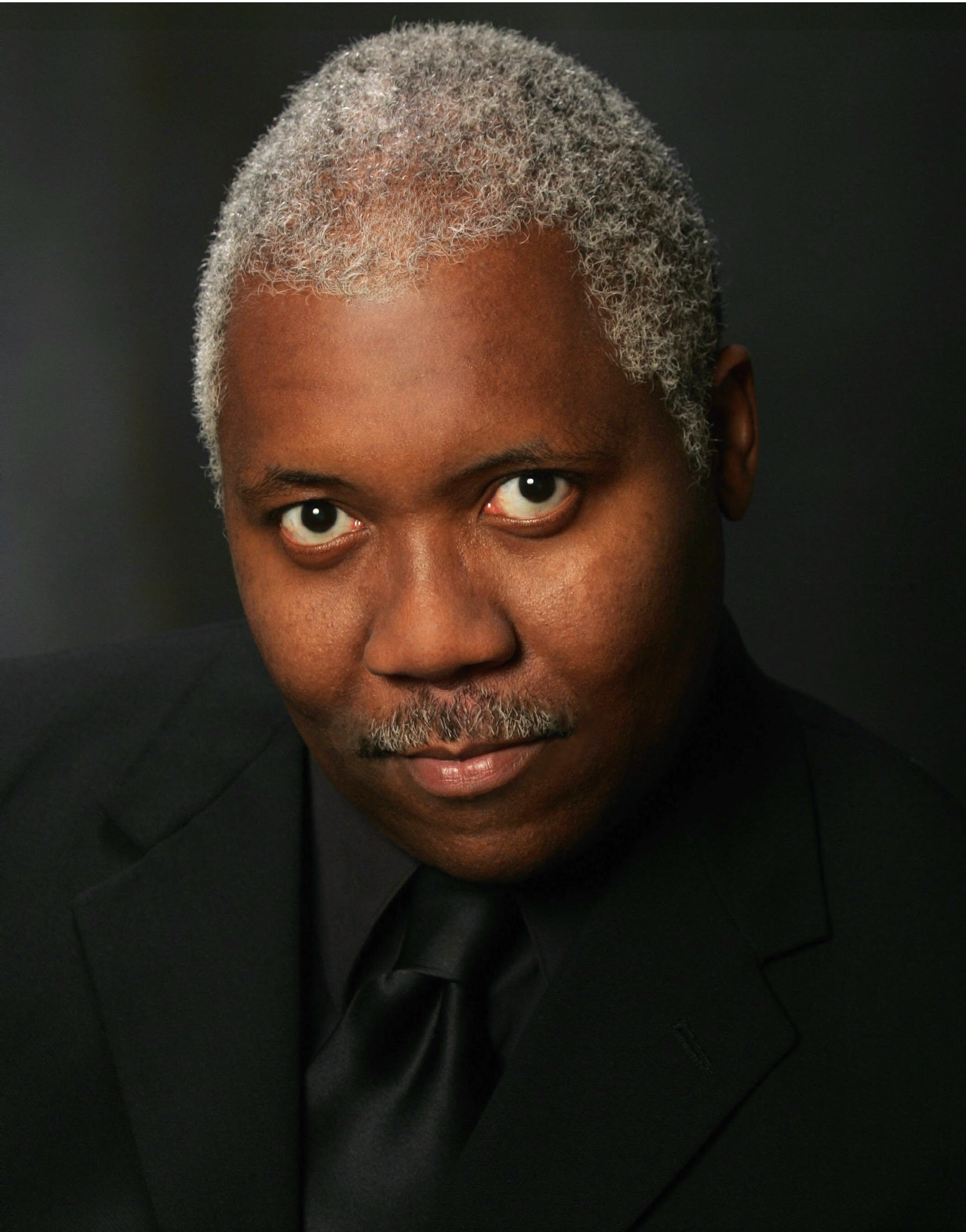
Voice actor Jeff Coopwood provided the voices for Captain Panaka and the game's narrator.

During the development process, LucasArts supplied most of the art and level-design, while Factor 5 provided the programming, tools, sound, and most of the cut-scene and art post-production work. After contemplating the idea of reusing Rogue Squadron's game engine, the team decided it was necessary to develop a new engine from scratch. Being more familiar with the Nintendo 64, Factor 5 was able to write Battle for Naboo's microcode by identifying the previous engine's strengths and weaknesses. Factor 5 stated that many of Battle for Naboo's technical aspects (such as a farther draw distance) "simply would not have been possible" using the Rogue Squadron engine. The game uses a particle system that was written in microcode for the Nintendo 64's Reality Signal Processor. The team first developed the technique to display falling snow in Indiana Jones and the Infernal Machine, another Nintendo 64 game that was developed simultaneously by the company. The result allowed Battle for Naboo to have rain and the snow effects that display up to 3,000 particles at any given time without compromising the game's frame rate and without using the system's central processing unit. Explosions and fountains also use these particle effects. Battle for Naboo also takes advantage of the Nintendo 64's memory expansion, the Expansion Pak, which allows gameplay at a higher display resolution.

Skywalker Sound supplied the development team with sound directly from The Phantom Menace for use in Battle for Naboo. Because its music is fully interactive and in real-time, the game required new material to be composed and pieces from the movie to be rewritten. Factor 5 again used its own sound drivers called MusyX to handle the game's sound, as it did with Rogue Squadron (then called MOsys FX Surround). The game includes voice work from voice actors Jeff Coopwood, Roger L. Jackson, Doug Boyd and Terry McGovern.

Unlike Rogue Squadron, which was developed and released for the Nintendo 64 and Windows simultaneously, Battle for Naboo was ported to Windows and released two months later. The Windows version features enhanced resolution and textures and includes a mouse-supported menu interface. On October 24, 2001, it was re-released as a part of the LucasArts Archive Series.

== Reception ==
Reception

Aggregate scores
Aggregator	Score	
Aggregator	N64	PC
GameRankings	82.21% (16 reviews)	57% (24 reviews)
Metacritic	84/100 (9 reviews)	54/100 (17 reviews)

Review scores
Publication	Score	
Publication	N64	PC
Electronic Gaming Monthly	6.83/10	N/A
GamePro	4.5/5; Editors' Choice	N/A
GameSpot	7.3/10	6.4/10
GameSpy	N/A	76%
IGN	9/10; Editors' Choice	7.4/10
Next Generation	N/A	2/5
Nintendo Power	4/5	N/A
X-Play	4/5	N/A
Computer Games Magazine	N/A	1.5/5

Award
Publication	Award
IGN	Game of the Month (December 2000)

Many reviews compared Battle for Naboo to Star Wars: Rogue Squadron. GamePro remarked that the games share the same "exciting aerial combat, sturdy controls, and ... absorbing story line", and IGN's Fran Mirabella III wrote, "Battle for Naboo proves to be a worthy follow up to Rogue by improving on nearly everything that held it back from perfection." EGM believed that, "if you liked Rogue Squadron, it's a good bet you'll like Naboo even more." GameSpot's Ryan Davis, however, thought that the game remained fun despite the "general lack of innovation over its predecessor" and believed it to be "one of the best Episode I titles to hit the market". The Nintendo 64 version received mostly positive reviews and received an aggregate score of 82 percent and 84 from GameRankings and Metacritic, respectively.

Battle for Naboo's controls were described as tight and responsive. Reviewers praised the addition of ground vehicles, which were completely absent from Rogue Squadron. Both Davis and Mirabella remarked that this addition keeps the game from getting stale or redundant. Nintendo Power thought that the game is at its best when the action isn't grounded, however, describing some of the ground missions as "tedious" and "uninspired". Some reviewers believed that the game's Episode I setting is less engaging than Rogue Squadron's original trilogy setting. Mirabella stated that "any fan of Rogue Squadron should enjoy Battle for Naboo just as much if they can get past the Episode I barrier", and Davis wrote that the game's setting "does not carry the same impact as the story of the original [trilogy]."

Critics directly compared Battle for Naboo's (top) draw distance to Rogue Squadron's (bottom).

The game's visuals were a source of disagreement between some critics. Extended Play's Matthew Keil wrote that the game's visuals are the "most notable improvement" over Rogue Squadron. Mirabella agreed and went on to call Battle for Naboo "one of the prettiest games to grace the N64." Both Keil and Mirabella praised the game for being less dependent on distance fog and "vastly" improving the draw distance over Rogue Squadron. Davis, however, wrote that "the graphics in Battle for Naboo are exactly the same as those of Rogue Squadron, flaws and all", and Nintendo Power's Andy Meyers cited "drab backgrounds and dry cinemas". EGM enjoyed the game's models and lighting, but thought the environments looked "blurry". Reviewers' opinions on the game's music and sound effects were generally less divided. Keil stated that the game showcases Factor 5's audio talents, and Mirabella and Davis described the audio as "atmospheric" and "immersive", respectively. One EGM reviewer lamented "the low-quality cartridge Episode I music", but another thought the sound was impressive.

With aggregated scores of 57 percent and 54 from GameRankings and Metacritic, respectively, Battle for Naboo's PC port garnered significantly lower review scores than its Nintendo 64 counterpart. Many complaints about the PC version stemmed from the fact that the game was not optimized for the PC when it was ported. Computer Games Magazine's Adam Fleet thought the game was ugly, citing "truly bland textures and sad-looking 2D sprites". Next Generation's Jim Preston bluntly wrote that the "graphics suck." Of the audio, GameSpot's Giancarlo Varanini wrote, "[it] isn't that bad, but it isn't quite as good as the audio in other similar games", and goes on to describe the music as sounding "tinny." Varanini also took issue with the PC version's aiming controls, stating that because Battle for Naboo was originally designed for the Nintendo 64's analog controller, it is difficult to aim using a PC's digital keyboard. Preston agreed, writing that controlling the game is "nearly impossible" with a digital controller or mouse.
