= Super Turrican (1993 video game) =

- North American cover art
- Developer: Factor 5
- Publishers: NA: Seika Corp.; EU: Hudson Soft; JP: Tonkin House; WW: Factor 5
- Producer: Julian Eggebrecht
- Designers: Julian Eggebrecht, Holger Schmidt, Frank Matzke
- Artists: Frank Matzke, Ramiro Vaca, Andreas Escher
- Composer: Chris Huelsbeck
- Series: Turrican
- Platform: Super NES
- Release: Super NES: EU: 1993; NA: May 1993; JP: September 3, 1993; Director's Cut: WW: 2022
- Genre: Run and gun
- Mode: Single-player

Super Turrican is a 1993 run and gun video game released by Factor 5 for the Super Nintendo Entertainment System. The European version was published by Hudson Soft, the North American version was published by Seika Corporation, and the Japanese version was published by Tonkin House. It is the fifth game in the Turrican series.

== Gameplay ==
It plays similarly to Mega Turrican (also developed by Factor 5) and shares a similar visual style. The game has a different set of levels, however, and features a freeze beam in place of the original lightning whip. The game only features 4 worlds and ends with the H. R. Giger-inspired alien boss, despite a representation of 'The Machine', similar to that featured in Mega Turrican, appearing in the prologue.

== Release ==
Super Turrican was released on the Virtual Console in Europe and Australia on February 29, 2008, and in North America on March 3, 2008.

A previously unreleased uncut version of the game, Super Turrican: Director's Cut, was included with the Analogue Super Nt console. Previously, this uncut version was considered for release on the Wii's Virtual Console, but was rejected by Nintendo due to not being previously released on consoles. The Director's Cut was released as an aftermarket cartridge for the original SNES console in 2022, also including the original game.

== Reception ==
Reception

Aggregate score
Aggregator	Score
GameRankings	76.70%

Review scores
Publication	Score
Computer and Video Games	83/100
Electronic Gaming Monthly	8/10
Famitsu	6/10, 6/10; 6/10, 6/10
Game Informer	8/10
GameFan	85%, 92%, 93%, 80%
GamesMaster	90%
Nintendo Power	3.425/5
Official Nintendo Magazine	83/100
Super Play	80%
Total!	(UK) 75% (DE) 2+
VideoGames & Computer Entertainment	8/10
Dengeki Super Famicom	7/10, 6/10, 5/10, 7/10
Electronic Games	88%
SNES Force	83/100
Super Action	88%
Super Control	85%
The Super Famicom	52/100
Super Gamer	89%
Super Pro	89/100

Super Turrican on the SNES received generally favorable reception, holding a rating of 76.70% based on five reviews according to review aggregator website GameRankings.
