= Turrican II: The Final Fight =

1991 video game

- Developers: Rainbow Arts (C64); Factor 5 (Amiga, ST); Enigma Variations (CPC, ZX); Sun-Project (MS-DOS); The Code Monkeys (MD, GB)
- Publishers: Rainbow Arts; Accolade (Universal Soldier)
- Producer: Julian Eggebrecht
- Designers: Manfred Trenz; Andreas Escher; Holger Schmidt; Julian Eggebrecht
- Programmers: Holger Schmidt (Amiga); Thomas Engel (ST)
- Composers: Markus Siebold; Chris Huelsbeck
- Platforms: Amiga, Atari ST, Amstrad CPC, CDTV, Commodore 64, MS-DOS, ZX Spectrum; Universal Soldier; Mega Drive/Genesis, Game Boy
- Release: C64, Amiga, ST, CPC, Spectrum: EU: 1991; MS-DOS: EU: 1995; Universal Soldier; Genesis, Game Boy: NA: 1992; EU: 1992
- Genre: Run and gun
- Mode: Single-player

Turrican II: The Final Fight is a run and gun video game developed by Factor 5 and published by Rainbow Arts in 1991 for the Amiga. This version was finished before the Commodore 64 version, but designer Manfred Trenz cites the C64 version as the original. Turrican II was also released for the CDTV, Atari ST, Amstrad CPC, and ZX Spectrum, and later for MS-DOS, and also for the Mega Drive/Genesis, and Game Boy rebranded as Universal Soldier.

The Amiga version of Turrican II along with Turrican, Super Turrican and Mega Turrican were re-released on the PlayStation 4 and Nintendo Switch in 2020 to commemorate the 30th anniversary of the original game, under the name Turrican Flashback.

== Plot ==
This is the text from the game's opening cutscene:

The timedate is 3025. For decades peace, freedom, and the rule of law in galaxy have been enforced by the United Planets Freedom Forces. The United Planets Ship, the Avalon 1, is drifting through the outer reaches of the known universe. Colonel Ardon C. Striker and his crew are preparing for the final passage through the barrier of the galaxy.

Suddenly, a huge battlecruiser materializes in close proximity of the Avalon 1. The crew hurry to take up their battle stations amid the sounding of the alert sirens. The automated defence systems of the ship activate, the anti-radiation shields surround the ship and finally the weapon systems are armed. Somehow, with some unknown technology, the enemy battlecruiser, with a flash of blinding light, neutralizes every defence system on the Avalon 1. The sound of an explosion fills the air as an airlock of the ship disintegrates and mutants begin to pour through. The crew fight to save their ship with their phasers and dozens of the invaders fall to death, but they press forward their attack and the crew of the Avalon 1 start to fall down while desperately engaging them in hand-to-hand fighting. One of the Avalon 1 soldiers, Bren McGuire, with tears in his eyes, fires the last of his phaser bolts, downing a mutant and diving to the ground as a chunk of structure falls from above.

After an intense fight that wipes out all tripulants of the ship, there is silence as the evil emperor known as The Machine, half-man, half-robot enters the airlock and commands his mutants back to the battle-cruiser. The Machine surveys the carnage, steps forward and comes to halt with one foot on the prone body of Bren McGuire. "Excellent", he says to himself, "the crew of Avalon 1 are no more". Then, without any further hesitation, he turns and leaves the ship. Bren McGuire lays still until he is certain that he is alone on the ravaged ship. Realizing that he is the only one left to combat the evil of the invaders and restore peace and freedom to the galaxy, he gets up and hurries to the equipment room. There, Bren sights the new Turrican fighting suits, which are built of the most advanced technology known to mankind. Climbing into the suit, one last cry is heard from him: "Revenge!"

== Gameplay ==
The first level of the game (Amiga version)

Turrican II can be described as a cross between Metroid and Psycho-Nics Oscar. While the huge detailed labyrinth levels and the morph-ball function were inspired by Metroid, the overall graphics design and weapons were inspired by Psycho-Nics Oscar.

The game is divided into five distinct "worlds", split across eleven levels, each with its own themed music provided by Chris Huelsbeck, plus a final showdown with the boss known as "The Machine". There is a music menu accessible by pressing the Space-Bar (Amiga version), where all the in-game music is available to be listened to. The music to Turrican II is widely regarded as one of Huelsbeck's best compositions, and it was performed live by an orchestra at the second Symphonic Game Music Concert in 2004. In 2016 Chris Huelsbeck created a limited Collector's Edition Box Set featuring new live orchestra recordings of music from Turrican II.

== Weapons ==
There are three primary weapons; Bounce, Laser and Multiple. Each weapon has several levels of firepower. In addition, there is a white laser "wall" which sweeps out from either side of the player. The player starts off with only three of these at the start of each life. There is also a very powerful secondary weapon activated by holding down the fire button. This takes the form of a long segmented steerable laser beam which is essential for defeating bosses.

Power-ups

Hidden in the worlds are many Power-Up blocks, which can be discovered by hitting them with weapon fire. They contain shields, health & primary and secondary weapon power-ups.

Wheel

The Wheel is an indestructible ball that the player can switch to by pressing the down key and then Space bar or a second button on a joystick that supports it. Unlike its predecessor the indestructible wheel mode can be used an unlimited number of times. The Wheel will destroy most small enemies on contact, others can be destroyed using the primary fire mode which fires small bombs on the ground. There is also an ultra-fire mode which can be used once per life by pressing fire and the space bar at the same time.

Shield

Protection from damage for a limited time.

== Development ==
The Amiga and Atari ST versions of Turrican II, as published by Rainbow Arts, began development in May 1990, and were released in February 1991. In a January 1991 issue of British gaming magazine The One, The One interviewed team members from Rainbow Arts for information regarding Turrican II's development in a pre-release interview. According to Manfred Trenz, a designer for Turrican and Turrican II, he picked the name from a phone book, and Turrican stemmed from the Italian name 'Turricano'; Trenz further stated that he "always get[s] titles that way: there's loads of good material out there, you don't have to bother making it up." Turrican II has seven-layer parallax scrolling, and was originally coded on the Commodore 64, as was its predecessor. While Turrican I was used as a base, Turrican II is primarily newly written code: Holger Schmidt, the programmer of the Amiga version, stated that "All we really kept were the scrolling routines. Everything else was optimized and rewritten because we needed more processing time for the sprites and animation." Trenz expressed that his design philosophy in creating Turrican II was 'making a game he'd want to play', and for this reason, more enemies and weapons were added; several design concepts that didn't make the cut for Turrican I due to time constraints were also incorporated into Turrican II. Trenz also expressed that some ideas from fans of the original game were incorporated into Turrican II, stating that "So many people wanted so many different things I couldn't please them all. In the end I just did the best I could."

Turrican II was developed using Rainbow Arts' custom development system titled Pegasus. Julian Eggbrecht, Turrican II's producer, expressed that a difficulty in the game's development was the game's scrolling conflicting with the game's desired frame rate, stating that "Action games consist of patterns of little bytes like a jigsaw and on 16-bit you waste a lot of time just by building up the screen. Hardly anyone has tried multidirectional in 50 frames before and at first we didn't think that it would work - most action adventures run in 25 frames or even 17 - but eventually, using a lot of tricks, we did it." Eggbrecht expressed that while the team wanted Turrican II to have 'arcade quality' graphics, he stated that the team tried to avoid "sacrifici[ing] presentation to playability", giving an example of world two having a lower frame rate and less parallax due to the high number of enemies on that level. The Atari ST version of Turrican II was programmed by Thomas Engel, who managed to get the game running at a 25 Hz frame rate with the same amount of parallax and sound effects as the Amiga version: Eggbrecht stated that this was achieved not through hardware scrolling techniques, but by "using eight buffers and by pre-shifting all the enemies in memory." Turrican II has 10 sampled speech sound effects, and the game's sound runs on four channels. Turrican II's sound and music was created by Chris Huelsbeck using Rainbow Art's custom sound utility TFMX; Huelsbeck stated that TFMX "allows you to modify [sounds] like a synthesiser", allowing greater audio editing. The Amiga and Atari ST versions use a 16-color palette, but through programming techniques, the Amiga version has around 120 colors, despite being written in 16-color mode as opposed to 32-color mode due to memory constraints.

Turrican II's levels were primarily made by Trenz, Andreas Escher, and Schmidt: Trenz first created the levels on the C64 using sprite, level and monster editors and then provided the raw data to Schmidt for processing. While Rainbow Arts used several other custom editors in Turrican II's development, they had no level editors for the Amiga and Atari ST, and thus edited level data at the code level as needed. The 'MegaWeapon' in Turrican II was partially inspired by the Lotus Blossom weapon in The Last Starfighter.

== Universal Soldier ==
Console conversions of Turrican II for the Sega Mega Drive/Genesis, SNES and Game Boy were produced by The Code Monkeys for Accolade, which had kept the rights for the console ports of the franchise. The game was originally developed using the original C64 source code and Amiga graphics as a base. At a late stage in the development, Accolade also acquired rights to produce a game spin-off of the Jean-Claude Van Damme movie Universal Soldier and decided to rebrand the console conversions as Universal Soldier. Turrican's sprite was changed into a marine and several other substitutions were made. Among other changes, the eyeballs-walking-on-fingers became mini tanks, and instead of a large mech/steel dragon in the first stage, the player now faces a large representation of Dolph Lundgren's character in the film.

The three shoot 'em up stages, cut out from the port, were replaced by the developers with three original stages (a Vietnam jungle, a fortress, and a motel/car junkyard) that in theory should link the game to the film's atmosphere. The rest of the original Turrican II stages are still present and remain mostly intact in overall design, though some of them appear in a different order, along with the three new levels scattered through them.

In the end, Accolade only released the Mega Drive/Genesis and Game Boy versions in both North America and Europe. Accolade decided not to publish the SNES version due to the high cost of larger capacity SNES cartridges, so it only exists in the form of a leaked pre-production alpha ROM. As none of the computer versions were published in North America, these disenfranchised ports were the only official North American releases of Turrican II until Turrican Flashback was released.

=== Reception ===
Reception

Awards
Publication	Award
Crash	Crash Smash
Your Sinclair	Megagame
Amstrad Action	Mastergame

Entertainment Weekly gave the game a D+ and wrote that "Universal in name only, this is very reminiscent of a mediocre action game called Turrican, featuring the kind of dinky enemies that have plagued the genre for years, as well as a hero who curls up into a buzzing circular saw. It's still no worse than the movies it has absolutely nothing to do with."

In 1993, Commodore Force ranked the game at number seven on its list of the top 100 Commodore 64 games.
