= Tiny Thor =

2023 video game

- Developer: Asylum Square Interactive
- Publisher: Gameforge
- Platforms: Windows, Nintendo Switch
- Release: Windows: WW: 5 June 2023; Switch: WW: 3 August 2023
- Genre: Platform
- Mode: Single-player

Tiny Thor is a 2023 video game developed by Asylum Square and published by Gameforge for Windows and the Nintendo Switch. It is a side-scrolling platformer in which players assume the role of the Norse god Thor, as a child, who uses his hammer Mjölnir to defeat enemies across 30 levels. Upon release, the game received generally favorable reviews.

== Gameplay ==
Gameplay

The game is a two-dimensional side-scrolling platformer in which players use the weapon to defeat enemies to clear 30 levels set across three realms. Players use the hammer to spin and throw it to defeat enemies, and can bounce off walls and ceilings until recalled by the player. Each level is linear, although includes shortcuts and secret areas to discover. Players can use gems collected through the level at an upgrade shop to purchase abilities, such as faster use and recall of the hammer.

== Plot ==
Players assume the role of the titular Thor who is granted the weapon Mjölnir by Odin on his eighth birthday. After being tricked by Loki, Thor damages the bifrost, cutting off Asgard, and he sets out into the work to repair the damage and prevent Ragnarök from causing the end of the world. out into the world to assist the other Gods defeat evil.

== Development and release ==
Tiny Thor was produced by Asylum Square, an independent development team of six. Studio founder Jochen Heizmann stated the game was inspired by an attempt to merge the visual style of the Amiga and Super NES, and create a platformer with modernised mechanics and designs. The game featured work by artist Henk Nieborg, who had worked on Spyro: A Hero's Tail, and composer Chris Hulsbeck, who had composed Star Wars: Rogue Squadron. Publisher Gameforge announced Tiny Thor in February 2023 as part of Indieforge, a partnership initiative with independent studios. The Windows version was released on 5 June 2023, distributed on Steam and GOG and the Epic Games Store, and the Nintendo Switch version on 3 August.

Following release of the game on Windows, the game received an update alongside release of the Nintendo Switch version to introduce an "accessibility mode" to the game. Strictly Limited Games published a limited physical release of 4000 copies, titled Mjönir Edition, that included the game's soundtrack and the studio's previous title, Hammer Kid.

== Reception ==
Reception

Aggregate score
Aggregator	Score
Metacritic	76%

Review scores
Publication	Score
Eurogamer	3/5
Nintendo Life	6.9/10
Nintendo World Report	7/10
Cubed3	8/10
Softpedia	4/5

Tiny Thor received "generally favorable" reviews, according to review aggregator platform Metacritic.
