= International Superstar Soccer Deluxe =

1995 video game

- Developers: Konami (SNES); Factor 5 (MD)
- Publisher: Konami
- Series: International Superstar Soccer
- Platforms: SNES, Mega Drive, PlayStation
- Release: SNES: JP: September 22, 1995; NA: November 1995; EU: January 25, 1996; Mega Drive: EU: December 5, 1996; PlayStation: EU: February 14, 1997
- Genre: Sports
- Modes: Single-player, multiplayer

International Superstar Soccer Deluxe, known as Jikkyou World Soccer 2: Fighting Eleven in Japan and also known as ISS Deluxe, is a 1995 football video game and the sequel to International Superstar Soccer developed and published by Konami. The Deluxe version was published first to the SNES in 1995, then the Mega Drive in 1996 (developed by Factor 5) and finally the PlayStation in 1997.

The game features 16 different formations, and 8 strategies, and includes 36 national sides. However, all players have fictitious names, due to a lack of official licensing.

== Game Modes ==
There are 6 different game modes. While there is no game saving function, there is a password system that allows the player to restore a previous game.

Open Game: A friendly match against a human player or the CPU with the option to choose a stadium, weather conditions, player's handicap, number of players on the pitch and the skill level of the goal keeper. It is also possible to spectate a CPU vs CPU match.

There's a "Short League" mode where you can play in a 24-team mini-league, and a "Short Tournament" with 64 teams competing in a knockout tournament.

International Cup: a World Cup mode starting from a regional qualifying round.

European Cup: a Euro Cup mode starting from a regional qualifying round.

World Series: a 36 teams league playing home and away.

Scenario: 12 scenarios recreating historical matches. The game starts during the match in different conditions, and the player has to defend the result or make a comeback depending on the difficulty level.

Penalty Kicks: the standard 5 penalty kicks mode with sudden death if both teams are tied.

Training: there are 3 different training modes; free training where you can try the game controls on the pitch, free kick training and corner kick training. There's also a "challenge mode" where you can beat records in different skills.

== Gameplay ==
The game contains eight different stadiums, and all vary in the material of the pitch and the surrounding décor, and are all of different sizes. The game can be played in many weather conditions. Below is a list of the different dimensions of the eight national stadiums in-game:

- Lagos National Stadium (Nigeria): 90 x 138 (yards) 81.9 x 125.58 (meters)
- Maracanã Stadium (Brazil): 90 x 114 (yards) 81.9 x 103.74 (meters)
- Munich Olympic Stadium (Germany): 74 x 122 (yards) 67.34 x 111 (meters)
- Osaka Nagai Stadium (Japan): 74 x 114 (yards) 67.34 x 103.74 (meters)
- Rose Bowl (United States): 82 x 118 (yards) 74.62 x 107.38 (meters)
- San Paolo Stadium (Italy): 82 x 132 (yards) 74.62 x 120.12 (meters)
- Santiago Bernabéu Stadium (Spain): 90 x 126 (yards) 81.9 x 114.61 (meters)
- Wembley Stadium (England): 82 x 122 (yards) 74.62 x 111 (meters)

The game also contains 36 national teams in groups of 6 based on their region

=== UEFA 1 ===
- England
- Germany
- Italy
- Northern Ireland
- Scotland
- Wales

=== UEFA 2 ===
- France
- (Republic of Ireland) Ireland
- Netherlands
- Norway
- Portugal
- Spain

=== AFC–CAF ===
- Cameroon
- Japan
- Morocco
- Nigeria
- South Korea
- Turkey

=== UEFA 3 ===
- Austria
- Belgium
- Czech Republic
- Denmark
- Poland
- Sweden

=== UEFA 4 ===
- Bulgaria
- Croatia
- Greece
- Romania
- Russia
- Switzerland

=== CONMEBOL–CONCACAF ===
- Argentina
- Brazil
- Colombia
- Mexico
- United States
- Uruguay

== Scenario ==
Besides friendly matches and tournaments, the player could also choose the Scenario mode, where they would resume a game with his team either losing and tying to win it within the few time left on the clock. The matches in the Scenario mode were heavily influenced by real matches with similar score.

Fixture	Possession	Description	Notes
Italy 1–2 Croatia (1:14 remaining)	Italy (free kick)	It seems like a defeat for ITALY against the talented CROATIA. ITALY scored a goal in the second half. Now they are trying to turn the tables around.	Italy lost against Croatia on November 16, 1994, during a Euro 96 qualifier played in Palermo.
Germany 2–3 Bulgaria (1:02 remaining)	Germany (free kick)	Although GERMANY had a 2 goals lead, they gave BULGARIA a penalty, and now they are behind by a goal. BULGARIA is a dangerous team to handle.	Germany lost 3–2 against Bulgaria in Sofia on June 7, 1995. A subsequent match in Berlin on November 15, 1995 ended 3–1.
England 1–3 Brazil (1:54 remaining)	England (corner kick)	It's ENGLAND, the home of football, against the champions, BRAZIL. ENGLAND can not end the game as it is, for the sake of their pride.	England lost against Brazil in the Umbro Cup.
Germany 0–0 Italy (0:56 remaining)	Germany (free kick)	GERMANY cannot score a goal against ITALY, even though the ITALIANS are playing poorly. GERMANY wants to turn the tables with this free kick.	Germany defeated Italy 2-0 on a friendly match for the 100th anniversary of the Swiss Football Association.
Turkey 1–1 Sweden (0:49 remaining)	Sweden (throw in)	TURKEY is doing extremely well against SWEDEN, who have been playing with their best team. One more goal for a historical win.	Turkey defeated the Swedes 2–1 in their Euro '96 qualifier on March 29, 1995.
Belgium 1–1 Spain (0:42 remaining)	Belgium (free kick)	In the last game when they faced each other, BELGIUM were soundly beaten. Although many key players are out, this time they want to make it even.	Belgium played to a draw against Spain in their Euro '96 qualifier in Seville on March 29, 1995. On December 17, 1994, Spain won away for 1–4.
Romania 0–1 Poland (1:43 remaining)	Romania (free kick)	ROMANIA is in good conditions. Even though they have let POLAND take the lead, there is plenty of time to turn it around.	Romania beat Poland 2–1 in their Euro '96 qualifier on March 29, 1995.
Scotland 0–0 Russia (1:24 remaining)	Scotland (goal kick)	SCOTLAND is eager a ticket to ENGLAND for the finals. The most important thing to do is defeat RUSSIA right now.	Scotland's Euro '96 qualifier against Russia in Moscow on March 29, 1995 ended 0–0. On November 16, 1994, the match in Glasgow ended 1-1.
Portugal 0–1 Republic of Ireland (0:38 remaining)	Portugal (free kick)	PORTUGAL have regained their old strong form. But they have just conceded an own goal. Concentrate and you may yet win.	Portugal lost against Ireland in a Euro '96 qualifier in Dublin on April 26, 1995. On November 15, 1995, the match in Lisbon ended 3–0.
Argentina 2–2 Brazil (0:49 remaining)	Argentina (corner kick)	BRAZIL are strong. They seem like they can score from anywhere. But this is for the South American championship, so ARGENTINA must fight back.	Brasil defeated Argentina on the penalties after a 2-2 draw for the quarterfinals of the 1995 Copa América.
Netherlands 1–3 Czech Republic (1:38 remaining)	Holland (free kick)	HOLLAND’S defence has been shattered in the second half. Unless their offense starts something, they have no choice but to lose.	Holland lost a Euro '96 qualifier to the Czech Republic 3–1 in Prague on April 26, 1995. On November 16, 1994, the match in Rotterdam ended 0–0.
England 1–1 Japan (0:02 remaining)	England (corner kick)	Unbelievably, ENGLAND conceded a goal to a country from ASIA. It will be just a losing if the game ends in a tie.	England conceded an early goal against Japan in a match of the Umbro Cup and went on to win 2–1.

== Reception ==
SNES reviews

Review scores
Publication	Score
Computer and Video Games	91%
GamePro	4/5
Next Generation	3/5

Reviewing the Super NES version, Computer and Video Games rated it 91% and said the "best soccer game on the Super NES has been improved" and it is "an essential buy for fans of fast, fun footy."

Videohead of GamePro rated the SNES version 4 out of 5, saying "it "ain't FIFA, but it's a respectable game" that "brings solid play to the match" and which soccer fans should appreciate. He said the game has easy controls with a short learning curve, but that manual goalie control is difficult and high kicks tend to send the ball off-screen due to the large sprites and close-in side view. He praised the announcer's voice and crowd chants.

Next Generation reviewed the Super NES version of the game, rating it three stars out of five, and stated that "Overall, this particular stab at the Soccer genre is slightly above average, but not by much."

The Mega Drive version received generally positive reviews in Europe. In the United Kingdom, Computer and Video Games praised the game's extensive options and distinctive arcade-style play, though it considered the graphics and sound comparatively unimpressive and noted that the console already had numerous football games. The magazine nevertheless regarded it as the best option for players seeking something different.

French magazine Joypad awarded the Mega Drive version 92%, praising its speed, animation, tactical depth and wide range of techniques. It considered the game superior to contemporary FIFA titles and described it as an exceptional football game for the Mega Drive. German magazine NeXt Level gave it 90%, commending Factor 5 for extracting strong technical performance from the ageing Mega Drive hardware, particularly its animation and speech samples, and described it as an outstanding sports simulation for the end of the console's life.

In Spain, Hobby Consolas awarded the game 91%, praising its fluid animation, accessible controls, tactical options and variety of game modes. The magazine described it as the best Mega Drive football option for players seeking an entertaining game while awaiting FIFA 97, although it criticised the absence of club teams and league competitions.

In 1996, GamesMaster ranked the SNES version 8th on their "The GamesMaster SNES Top 10." In the same issue, they also ranked the game 34th in its "Top 100 Games of All Time."
