= Star Wars: Rogue Squadron =

1998 video game

- The game's Nintendo 64 box art shows a hand-drawn dogfight, while the PC artwork features a computer-rendered scene.
- Developers: Factor 5 LucasArts
- Publisher: LucasArts
- Directors: Mark Haigh-Hutchinson; Brett Tosti
- Producer: Julian Eggebrecht
- Designer: Kevin Schmitt
- Programmers: Thomas Engel; Holger Schmidt; Amit Shalev
- Artist: Craig Rundels
- Composer: Chris Huelsbeck
- Series: Star Wars: Rogue Squadron
- Platforms: Microsoft Windows, Nintendo 64
- Release: Windows: NA: December 3, 1998; EU: December 4, 1998; Nintendo 64: NA: December 8, 1998; EU: January 10, 1999
- Genres: Action, Arcade flight
- Mode: Single-player

Star Wars: Rogue Squadron or Star Wars: Rogue Squadron 3D (Note: Released as Star Wars: Rogue Squadron 3D on Microsoft Windows) is an arcade-style flight action game co-developed by Factor 5 and LucasArts. The first of the Rogue Squadron trilogy, it was published by LucasArts and released for Microsoft Windows and Nintendo 64 in December 1998. The game's story was influenced by the Star Wars: X-wing – Rogue Squadron comics and is set in the fictional Star Wars galaxy, taking place primarily between events in the films Star Wars and The Empire Strikes Back. The player controls Luke Skywalker, commander of the elite X-wing pilots known as Rogue Squadron. As the game progresses, Skywalker and Rogue Squadron fight the Galactic Empire in 16 missions across various planets.

Gameplay is presented from the third-person perspective, although players can switch to first person if they prefer. The game's objectives are divided into four categories: search and destroy, reconnaissance, rescue, and protect. The player can control up to five standard craft, with an additional two unlockable bonus craft on PC version, and three on 64 version. Each offers a unique armament arrangement, as well as varying degrees of speed and maneuverability. Bonus power-ups that improve these craft's weapons or durability are hidden in different levels throughout the game. After each level, the player's performance is checked against three medal benchmarks. Acquiring these medals promotes the player's rank and helps unlock hidden content.

Rogue Squadron's focus on flight combat was directly inspired by a level in Star Wars: Shadows of the Empire that allowed the player to pilot a snowspeeder. Working together during development, Factor 5 designed the game engine, the music, and worked closely with Nintendo, while LucasArts produced the game's story and gameplay and ensured it was faithful to Star Wars canon. Before the game's release, Factor 5 appealed to Nintendo to commercially release the Nintendo 64's newly developed memory Expansion Pak. Consequently, Rogue Squadron was one of the first games to take advantage of the Expansion Pak, which allows gameplay at a higher display resolution.

Upon release, critics praised the game's technical achievements and flight controls, but its use of distance fog and the lack of a multiplayer mode drew criticism. The game's sales exceeded expectations; by August 1999, more than one million copies had been sold worldwide. It spawned two sequels developed and released for the GameCube—Star Wars Rogue Squadron II: Rogue Leader and Star Wars Rogue Squadron III: Rebel Strike—as well as Star Wars Episode I: Battle for Naboo, a spiritual successor released for Windows and Nintendo 64.

== Gameplay ==
Unlike the Star Wars: X-Wing series that emphasizes space combat simulation, Rogue Squadron is a fast-paced, arcade-style flight action game. Each of the game's 16 levels introduces mission objectives that must be completed to progress to the next level. These objectives are divided into four categories: search and destroy, reconnaissance, rescue, and protect. Enemy aircraft are primarily composed of TIE fighters, TIE Bombers and TIE Interceptors. Ground defenses are more varied and include three different walkers, laser and missile turrets, tanks, probe droids, shuttles, stormtroopers, and speeder bikes.

Gameplay is presented from the third-person perspective; a view from a craft's cockpit is available. The heads-up display features a health meter, a radar, and an ammunition count for secondary weapons. The player can control five craft: X-wing, A-wing, Y-wing, snowspeeder and V-wing. Each vehicle offers a unique armament arrangement, as well as varying degrees of speed and maneuverability. The game initially restricts the player to a particular craft for each level; however, after a level is completed, it can be replayed with any available craft. Levels set on non-atmospheric moons expose the player's craft to space; thus disallowing the speeder and V-wing (which are repulsorcraft) from being used; but as on other levels, the craft is vertically confined. Nine bonus power-ups are hidden in different levels throughout the game. These bonuses improve a craft's weapons or durability and are applied to each eligible craft for the remainder of the game.

The player's performance is measured throughout the game, and performance statistics are checked after each level against three medal benchmarks. Each benchmark contains five categories: completion time, number of enemies destroyed, shot accuracy, number of friendly craft and structures saved, and number of bonuses collected. If a player's performance exceeds one of the level's three benchmarks in all five categories, a medal—bronze, silver, or gold—is awarded on completion. Acquiring these medals promotes the player's rank and helps unlock hidden content.

=== Unlockable content ===
Rogue Squadron includes many unlockable secrets. The player can unlock three bonus levels: "Beggar's Canyon", "The Death Star Trench Run", and "The Battle of Hoth". These levels are made available when the player obtains all bronze, silver, or gold medals, respectively, on each level. Alternatively, they can be unlocked via passcode. Unlike the game's primary levels, the bonus levels are adaptations of events from the Star Wars films. "Beggar's Canyon" allows the player to reenact the race mentioned in A New Hope, while "The Death Star Trench Run" allows the player to execute an alternate version of the film's climactic battle. In the "Battle of Hoth" bonus level, the player can join the Rebel Alliance's combat against Imperial troops, as depicted in The Empire Strikes Back.

Several craft are available when unlocked. Both the Millennium Falcon and a TIE interceptor are initially present in the craft selection screen. However, neither may be selected until the player enters the correct passcodes or achieves all bronze or silver medals, respectively, on the bonus levels. Two other craft can be unlocked, but each is confined to a specific level. One is the T-16 Skyhopper in "Beggar's Canyon", and an AT-ST is playable in a basic demonstration level unlocked only via passcode. A playable model of a 1969 Buick Electra 225 based on a car owned by the game's sound designer, Rudolph Stember, is included in the game as an Easter egg.

During Rogue Squadron's development, Star Wars: Episode I – The Phantom Menace—the first Star Wars film in more than 15 years—was less than one year from its scheduled release date. To take advantage of this marketing opportunity, Factor 5 included content from the upcoming film in Rogue Squadron. Lucasfilm provided the developers with design art for the Naboo Starfighter, a ship prominently featured in the new film. These designs were used to create an in-game model. Because the game was scheduled to be released six months before the film, Factor 5 was required to keep the ship's inclusion a secret. As a result, most of the game's development team at Factor 5 and LucasArts were not informed of its inclusion. A complex scrambling system was developed to help hide the ship's code from gamers using cheat cartridges such as GameShark or Action Replay. More than six months after the release of Rogue Squadron, LucasArts unveiled the code to unlock the Naboo Starfighter as a playable craft. The code has been named the Nintendo 64's most well-hidden code because of the length of time before its discovery.

== Synopsis ==
=== Setting ===
Star Wars: Rogue Squadron is set in the fictional Star Wars galaxy, where a war is fought between the Galactic Empire and the Rebel Alliance. The game's first fifteen levels occur six months after the Battle of Yavin—as depicted in A New Hope—and before the events of The Empire Strikes Back. As the Empire gathers strength for an all-out assault on the Rebel forces, Luke Skywalker and Wedge Antilles form Rogue Squadron, a group comprising twelve of the most skilled X-wing pilots from the Rebel Alliance.

The sixteenth and final level of the game takes place six years after Return of the Jedi's Battle of Endor. The Rebel Alliance has established the New Republic, which now controls three-quarters of the galaxy. After the deaths of Emperor Palpatine and Darth Vader, the Galactic Empire collapsed, but was reborn under a mysterious new leader. Rogue Squadron, now under the command of Wedge Antilles, continues to fight the Empire to protect the newly formed Republic.

=== Plot ===
The story is divided into four chapters, each of which starts with an opening crawl resembling those featured in the Star Wars films. Further story details are presented through the game's instruction manual, pre-mission briefings, character conversations during the game, and in-game cutscenes. The game begins with Rogue Squadron briefly encountering the Empire at the Mos Eisley spaceport on Tatooine. The team executes escort and rescue missions on Barkhesh and Chorax, respectively.

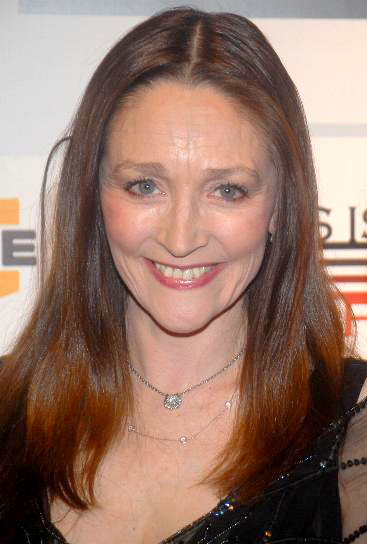
Screen actress Olivia Hussey provided voice work for Kasan Moor.

The Rebels learn that Imperial officer Crix Madine wishes to defect to the Rebel Alliance. The Empire launches an attack on Corellia, where Madine is stationed, to prevent his departure. Rogue Squadron, with the help of Han Solo and Chewbacca in the Millennium Falcon, fights off the Empire and helps escort Madine safely off the planet. Rogue Squadron is joined by Gold Squadron, a group of Y-wings now led by Crix Madine; they are dispatched to the moon of Gerrard V to aid its quest for independence from the Empire. They encounter the 128th TIE interceptor Squadron and disable Kasan Moor's TIE. When Rogue Squadron tells Moor that she has been taken prisoner, she offers to defect and provide the Rebel Alliance with Imperial intelligence.

With the help of Kasan Moor's intelligence, the Alliance launches three consecutive attacks on Imperial bases throughout the galaxy. After an assault on the Imperial Enclave, a facility on Kile II supporting the Empire's Naval operations, Wedge Antilles is ambushed by a group of TIEs and is taken captive. The Rebel Alliance tracks Wedge to an Imperial prison complex on the planet of Kessel. The remaining members of Rogue Squadron travel to Kessel and rescue him and other Rebel prisoners.

With Wedge Antilles free and Rogue Squadron again at full strength, the Rebel Alliance turns its attention to a new Imperial threat — Moff Kohl Seerdon. Seerdon is consolidating Imperial power in preparation for an attack aimed at capturing Thyferra, a planet that produces the healing substance bacta. Rogue Squadron is ordered to disrupt his operation with hit-and-run missions against key targets on Taloraan and Fest. In retaliation, Seerdon attacks and holds a city on the planet of Chandrila hostage. Rogue Squadron and the Alliance strike back by initiating a Kasan Moor-engineered raid on an Imperial base located inside a volcano on Sullust. While still on Sullust, however, General Rieekan informs the Squadron that Moff Seerdon has used their raid as a diversion and begun his attack on Thyferra. With Seerdon in control of the planet's bacta and their supply threatened, Rogue Squadron quickly reaches Thyferra, kills Seerdon, and frees the planet.

In the final chapter, the game moves into the future, six years after the Battle of Endor. Rogue Squadron, now under the command of Wedge Antilles, continues to fight the wounded Empire. On the planet of Mon Calamari, new Imperial weapons called World Devastators are destroying the planet. Rogue Squadron is deployed, disables all three Devastators and destroys the Imperial presence.

== Development ==
After the success of Star Wars: Shadows of the Empire on the Nintendo 64 in 1996, LucasArts began planning a follow-up. At the time, Factor 5 was developing a game engine to create large terrain maps for their planned sequel to LucasArts' Rescue on Fractalus! After LucasArts signed a three-game exclusivity deal with Nintendo, Factor 5 was allowed to convert their work on the new Fractalus sequel into a Star Wars game instead. The game's focus would be flight combat; this direction was inspired by a level of Shadows of the Empire in which the player flies a snowspeeder during the Battle of Hoth. Rogue Squadron and LucasArts production manager Brett Tosti stated, "That whole scene was actually the genesis for Rogue Squadron because everybody said, 'Why don't you do a whole game like that?' So we did." Factor 5 and LucasArts divided the game's development load. Factor 5 designed the game engine, the music, and worked closely with Nintendo, while LucasArts produced the game's content and ensured it was faithful to Star Wars canon.

Factor 5 initially pitched a concept to allow gamers to play through missions similar to the fans' favorite action sequences from the Star Wars films. This proposal was rejected, however. At that time, Lucasfilm was not comfortable with video games drawing directly from the films nor would they allow original content to be incorporated alongside battles from the films. Consequently, the resulting game was almost completely set in the Star Wars Expanded Universe. The designers at LucasArts initially planned to adapt Rogue Squadron and Star Wars: X-wing Rogue Squadron, a series of books and comic books set after the years of the original film trilogy, and have the game centered around Wedge Antilles. It was later decided that the game would instead focus on Luke Skywalker and primarily take place between the events of A New Hope and The Empire Strikes Back as it was more commercially appealing.

LucasArts began developing the story and gameplay in a setting that would include characters from the films participating in new, original missions using Factor 5's terrain map engine as the base. The development team's basic design plan was to combine the free-roaming style of Rescue on Fractalus with the on-rails gameplay of Atari's Star Wars arcade game. Initially, designing and refining the individualized flight controls for the game's various vehicles was difficult for programmer Mark Haigh-Hutchinson before breaking through to find the right balance for each. In May 1998, a demo of the game was displayed at E3, but the game was so incomplete at the time that Tosti considered it a tech demo. It rendered a basic heightmap and an immobile AT-AT model, while TIE fighters lacking artificial intelligence flew and fired in a predetermined path. When "playing" the demo for audiences, Tosti followed a specific flight path to give the illusion that he was battling with the TIEs. Despite the demo's bare-bones presentation, the response from gamers was largely positive. In the game's final build, many of the enemy fighters continued to follow predetermined flight paths as calculating flight paths on the fly required too much processing power.

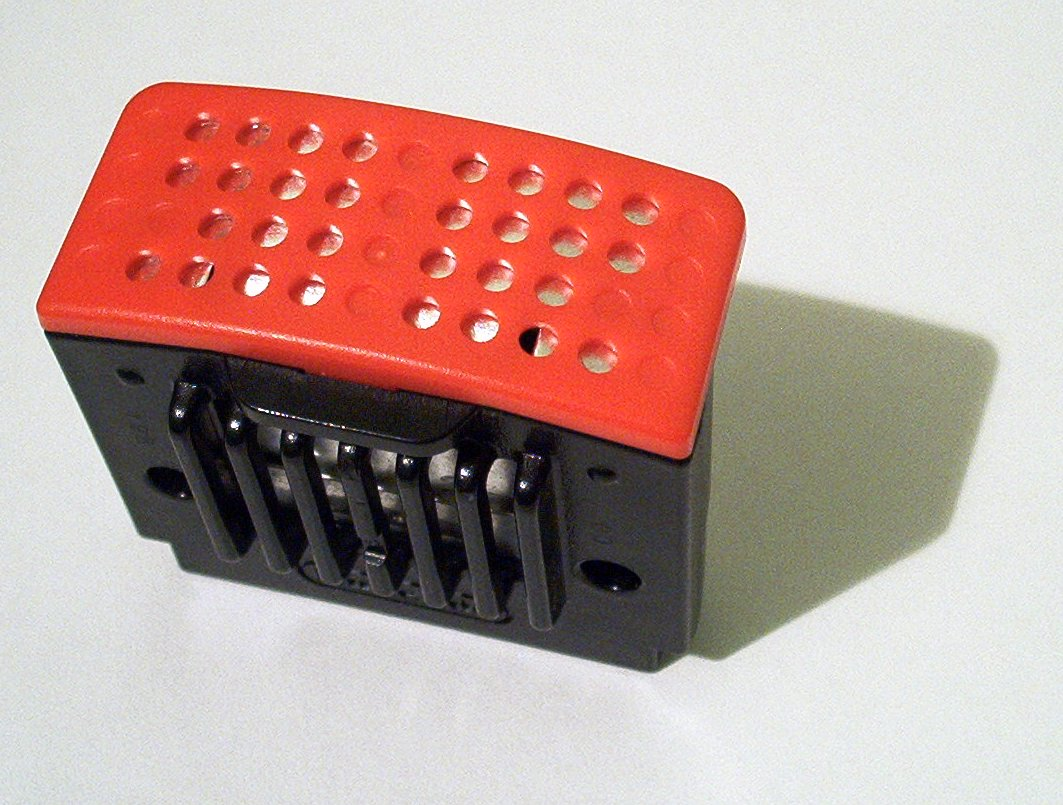
The Nintendo 64's Expansion Pak allows game play at a higher resolution.

Late in development, the team realized that they were developing the game with a Nintendo 64 memory expansion in place at all times. Unable to run the game on a standard Nintendo 64, they began working on compression techniques to allow the game to run within the confines of the standard console. At the same time, Factor 5 appealed to Nintendo to release the newly developed memory Expansion Pak commercially. Nintendo was reluctant, expecting the technology to be reserved solely for hardware peripherals. However, after Iguana Entertainment also wanted to use the Expansion Pak to achieve a higher display resolution for Turok 2: Seeds of Evil, Factor 5 was given the green light. Ultimately, Rogue Squadron was made to run on a standard Nintendo 64 but the Expansion Pak increases its resolution from 320 × 240 to 640 × 480.

Lucasfilm hesitated to grant access to the Star Wars sound effects library to Factor 5 sound designer Rudolph Stember. As a compromise, the company provided Stember with sounds sampled at the relatively low rate of 22 kHz, half the standard rate. Stember objected, claiming that the clips sounded worse than effects he had lifted from VHS tapes for a previous Star Wars project. The game includes voice work from several notable people, including screen actors Olivia Hussey and Raphael Sbarge as well as voice actors Bob Bergen, Neil Ross and Terence McGovern. Instead of using Nintendo's default sound drivers, Factor 5 developed its own tool called MOsys FX Surround. The Factor 5 drivers use Nintendo 64 processors, but tax them less; advanced compression techniques were employed. As a result, the game includes over 80 minutes of high-quality stereo sound.

In November 1998, a month before the game's release, LucasArts announced the worldwide agreement with Nintendo concerning three new Star Wars video games. It granted Nintendo the rights to market the games and hold exclusive, worldwide distribution rights for five years following each release. Rogue Squadron was the first game released under this agreement. To promote the release of the game, Mark Hamill, the actor who played Luke Skywalker in the Star Wars films, visited the Mattel Children's Hospital in Los Angeles to play the game with patients in a Starlight Children's Foundation's Fun Center.

== Reception ==
Reception

Aggregate scores
Aggregator	Score	
Aggregator	N64	PC
GameRankings	84.76% (19 reviews)	79.61% (22 reviews)
Metacritic	85/100 (15 reviews)	N/A

Review scores
Publication	Score	
Publication	N64	PC
AllGame	4/5	4/5
GamePro	5/5; Editors' Choice	4.5/5; Editors' Choice
GameSpot	7.9/10	8/10
IGN	8.8/10	8.3/10
Next Generation	4/5	N/A
Nintendo Power	9.1/10	N/A
PC Zone	N/A	7.7/10

Awards
Publication	Award
Origins Award	Best Action Computer Game of 1998
IGN	Best Sound of 1998 (N64); Best Overall Sound; Sound Effects; Best Voice

The R2 unit and exhaust flames on the player's X-wing are examples of graphical detail that reviewers praised.

Many reviews compared Star Wars: Rogue Squadron to one of its inspirations, the Battle of Hoth flight combat level in Star Wars: Shadows of the Empire, considered one of that game's best elements. GamePro remarked that Rogue Squadron "enhanced the flight model with true pitch, roll, and bank mechanics". IGN praised its inclusion of "upgrades, more enemies, better sound, and stunning second-generation graphics". The Nintendo 64 version received mostly positive reviews, and received an aggregate score of 85% from both GameRankings and Metacritic. GamePro named it one of the best games released in 1998. In a 2008 retrospective, IGN's Levi Buchanan stated that the game revived the Star Wars license on consoles through well-paced gameplay, a story tied into the Star Wars canon, and visuals that made it "one of the generation's top stunners".

The game's technical aspects were singled out for acclaim. Its visuals were called "respectable" in the standard resolution, but highly praised in high-resolution mode (achieved via the Nintendo 64's Expansion Pak). GameSpot remarked that in a higher resolution, "[the] textures of the landscapes, the ships, the lighting effects—everything looks so much better," while IGN's Peer Schneider said, "After playing the game in the optional high-resolution mode (640 × 480) once, it's impossible to go back to the still respectable standard resolution." Citing details such as decals, Rebel markings, R2 units, cockpit views, and exhaust flames, Schneider described the game's 3D ship models as "gorgeous". IGN's Matt Casamassina said that the game was the best-looking Nintendo 64 game to date.

Reviewers also praised the game's sound design. Powered by the new Factor 5 audio drivers, Rogue Squadron features about 40 minutes of speech and 40 minutes of music. GameSpot's Ryan Mac Donald believed that the game's inclusion of extended voice work helped create a "movie-like" atmosphere. IGN noted that in addition to being technically impressive, the game's Dolby Pro Logic surround sound was a critical gameplay element. The audio signals help the player determine enemy positions and the direction of travel. IGN awarded the game three sound awards, including Sound Effects, Best Voice, and Best Overall Sound of 1998 on the Nintendo 64. The game earned a nomination for "Game of the Year" at the AIAS' 2nd Annual Interactive Achievement Awards (now known as the D.I.C.E. Awards).

Some reviewers complained about aspects of the game's visuals; critics disliked the heavy reliance on distance fog. Another common criticism was the lack of multiplayer modes. GamePro's review called the omission a "serious, unforgivable sin"; Schneider believed that while adding these modes would have extended Rogue Squadron's replay value, the game was still enjoyable for its medal reward system and a large number of secrets and unlockables.

Although nearly identical, the game's PC version garnered lower review scores than its Nintendo 64 counterpart, with an aggregated GameRankings score of 80%. This version enjoyed many of the same praises for its gameplay, but handling and graphics were cited as problematic. Directly comparing the two versions, AllGame's Brad Cook wrote that the PC version's handling is more difficult than the Nintendo 64 version. He believed the PC's "choppy" feel made it difficult to target enemies. Unlike its opinion of the Nintendo 64 version, IGN's PC review was not enthusiastic about the game's visuals. IGN staff remarked that Rogue Squadron's "graphics and special effects aren't spectacular" and that they had "seen better graphics" on the PC.

=== Sales ===
When Rogue Squadron was released in early December 1998, the title's Nintendo 64 incarnation was the second-highest-selling video game for the first half of the month (behind Nintendo's The Legend of Zelda: Ocarina of Time) and the holiday season. PC Data, which tracked sales in the United States, reported that Rogue Squadron sold 584,337 units and earned $29.3 million in revenue by the end of 1998. This made it the country's ninth-best-selling Nintendo 64 release of the year. Delayed until after Christmas in the United Kingdom, the game was released mid-January and debuted as the second-best-selling game of the month, ahead of Ocarina of Time. In August 1999, Nintendo added the title to its best-selling Player's Choice collection, while the PC version was re-released as a part of the LucasArts Archive Series in May 2001. The PC version was also released via digital distribution in 2015. The Nintendo 64 version sold over one million copies in the United States, and over 44,000 in Japan. Rogue Squadron's retail success was not anticipated by the game's producer Julian Eggebrecht, who said that the game sold "about 100 times better than anybody expected". He believed that releasing the game shortly after the theatrical re-releases of the original Star Wars films and only five months before the theatrical release of Star Wars: Episode I – The Phantom Menace helped contribute to the game's success. Two sequels were later developed and released for the GameCube—Star Wars Rogue Squadron II: Rogue Leader and Star Wars Rogue Squadron III: Rebel Strike—as well as Star Wars Episode I: Battle for Naboo, a spiritual successor released for Windows and Nintendo 64.
