= Factor 5 =

German-American video game developer

Factor 5 GmbH Factor 5, Inc. (US branch)
- Type: Private
- Industry: Video games
- Founded: 1987
- Defunct: 2011
- Headquarters: Cologne, Germany; San Rafael, California, U.S.
- Key people: Achim Moller, CEO; Julian Eggebrecht, President (U.S. branch)
- Products: Lair; Rogue Squadron series Turrican series MusyX: Dolby Sound Tools; DivX For Games SDK
- Website: Official website

Factor 5 GmbH was a German-American independent software and video game developer. The company was co-founded by five former Rainbow Arts employees in 1987 in Cologne, Germany, which served as the inspiration behind the studio's name.

In order to have a stronger relationship with Factor 5's North American partners like LucasArts, Factor 5, Inc. was established in the United States in May 1996 with legal support from LucasArts, and in late 1996 the core of the development team in Germany was relocated to the North American company headquarters in San Rafael, California. Julian Eggebrecht, one of the five initial co-founders, served as President of Factor 5's U.S. branch.

The U.S. company closed in May 2009, following the closure of Brash Entertainment, with which the company had multiple contracts. The original German company, headed by CEO Achim Moller, remained active due to its unrelated business policy and operations with the North American company.

However, in January 2011, Moller liquidated Factor 5 GmbH, and all game licenses were transferred to "Eggebrecht, Engel, Schmidt GbR".

On March 15, 2017, Factor 5 co-founder Julian Eggebrecht had announced that the company has returned and re-acquired the rights to the Turrican franchise.

== History ==
The programming group which would eventually become Factor 5 had originally formed in the 1980s, in what cofounder Julian Eggebrecht described as a culture of hacking and multimedia programming on the local demo scene. Eggebrecht attended the Filmhochschule in Munich to become a movie director, and all the other members studied computer science.

While its founders were still university students, Factor 5 started out in game development as a part-time activity under partnership with Rainbow Arts for the Amiga computer. There, they had their earliest moderate success with Katakis, an R-Type clone of impressive technical performance. Due to the game's obvious similarity to R-Type, rights holder Activision Europe delivered an ultimatum: either Factor 5 accept a contract to perform the official R-Type conversion for the Amiga home computer, or receive a lawsuit for rights infringement. According to Julian Eggebrecht, this was because "Activision couldn't find any programmers" however the opportunity was "a dream come true".

Their first important success, however, came with Turrican, a game designed by Rainbow Arts designer Manfred Trenz. Factor 5 handled the Amiga and Atari ST versions of the game; and together with the original Commodore 64 version and several others, Turrican was a major hit across Europe in 1990.

In 1991, faced with the prospect of corporate formalities imposed by the video game console industry, the company founders quit school in favor of full-time corporate careers. Eggebrecht explained, "[t]he moment you go into console programming, you won't get a development system from Nintendo unless you have a reputable company." After they finished work on Turrican II: The Final Fight for the Amiga and Atari ST in 1991, Factor 5 built their own development kits and software environments for the Super Nintendo Entertainment System and Sega Mega Drive/Genesis, codenamed Pegasus SNES and Pegasus Mega Drive. Subsequently, they decided to focus their efforts towards console game development in 1992 with several projects for the SNES and Mega Drive/Genesis, including new Turrican games and other titles contracted by companies like LucasArts, Hudson Soft and Konami, the latter of which had also Game Boy development contracts with them. In 1993, Factor 5 produced their last Amiga effort, an Amiga conversion of Mega Turrican handled with programming support from fellow company Neon Studios. They would develop games for the SNES, Mega Drive/Genesis, and Game Boy until 1996, when they switched their efforts to the PlayStation.

At the January 1995 Consumer Electronics Show, Factor 5 developers Willy Bäcker, Thomas Engel and Holger Schmidt discussed their plans for the next generation of consoles. They revealed that the studio was developing an unnamed 3D game for the Sega Saturn for LucasArts, involving what they described as a well-known name, although a release was not expected before 1996. The developers also considered the Saturn more difficult to program than the PlayStation, praising its two-dimensional graphics capabilities while regarding Sony's console as superior for three-dimensional graphics.

With the development of PlayStation games for LucasArts, the personnel located in Germany experienced communication difficulties in working with their North American partner due to the distance between both countries and the Internet speeds of that time being insufficient for the requirements of console development. This, together with legal assistance offered by LucasArts, resulted in a new Factor 5 branch in California. There, the core of the development team from Germany was established after they finished work on their PlayStation games in late 1996.

For a long time, the North American branch of Factor 5 was an exclusive, known development partner with both LucasArts and Nintendo, developing both game titles for the former and middleware tools for the latter. During that time, the studio produced what are often cited as some of the most visually advanced titles on the Nintendo 64 and GameCube, all based on LucasArts properties. Two high-profile middleware tools were also developed by the company for Nintendo: MusyX, a sound system produced in cooperation with Dolby Laboratories; and the DivX For Games SDK, integrating the functionality of the widespread video codec into Nintendo's development tools.

In late December 2008, several online media outlets reported that Brash Entertainment (Factor 5's publisher of their current project) would close at the end of the month after encountering financial problems. This sudden interruption in funding left Factor 5 with their own funding difficulties, eventually causing its closure in May 2009.

Factor 5 had been involved in litigation with its former employees in the defunct North American Factor 5 company. The suit alleges that Factor 5 did not pay its employees for work during November and December, that employees were laid off without the required notice by law, that employees did not receive their vacation pay, and that the company misled the employees. The suit was filed in Marin Superior Court.

== Games ==
=== Factor 5 GmbH ===
==== Amiga ====
- 1988: Katakis
- 1989: R-Type
- 1990: Turrican
- 1990: Masterblazer (intro only)
- 1991: Turrican II: The Final Fight
- 1992: BC Kid
- 1993: Turrican 3 (conversion program by Neon Studios)
- 1994: Tony & Friends in Kellogg's Land

==== Atari ST ====
- 1990: Turrican
- 1991: Turrican II: The Final Fight

==== Super Nintendo Entertainment System ====
- 1993: Super Turrican
- 1994: Indiana Jones' Greatest Adventures
- 1995: Super Turrican 2

==== Sega Mega Drive/Genesis ====
- 1993: Mega Turrican (released in 1994)
- 1994: Mega Bomberman 8-players (unpublished demo)
- 1996: International Superstar Soccer Deluxe

==== Game Boy ====
- 1994: Contra: The Alien Wars
- 1995: Animaniacs

==== MS-DOS ====
- 1994: Tony & Friends in Kellogg's Land

==== PlayStation ====
- 1996: Star Wars: Rebel Assault II: The Hidden Empire
- 1997: Ballblazer Champions

==== Cancelled games ====
- Indiana Jones' Greatest Adventures (completed but unreleased) (Sega Mega Drive/Genesis)

=== Factor 5, Inc. ===
==== Nintendo 64 ====
- 1998: Star Wars: Rogue Squadron
- 1999: Pokémon Stadium (Sound Compression Technology)
- 1999: Resident Evil 2 (Sound Compression Technology)
- 1999: Elmo's Letter Adventure (Sound Compression Technology)
- 2000: San Francisco Rush 2049 (Sound Compression Technology)
- 2000: Star Wars: Episode I: Battle for Naboo
- 2000: Indiana Jones and the Infernal Machine
- 2000: Pokémon Stadium 2 (Sound Compression Technology)

==== Microsoft Windows ====
- 1999: Star Wars: Rogue Squadron 3D
- 2001: Star Wars Episode I: Battle for Naboo

==== GameCube ====
- 2001: Star Wars Rogue Squadron II: Rogue Leader
- 2003: Star Wars Rogue Squadron III: Rebel Strike

==== PlayStation 3 ====
- 2007: Lair

==== Cancelled games ====
- Animal Wars (PS3)
- Icarus (reboot of Kid Icarus) (Wii)
- Untitled Pilotwings project (GameCube)
- Star Wars Rogue Squadron: Rogue Leaders Wii (completed but unreleased) (Wii)
- Thornado (Nintendo 64)
- Thornado (GameCube)
- Turrican: Cyclone (PS3)
- Virus (PS3)
- WeFly (Wii)
- Superman (PS3, Xbox 360)

== Technology ==
- MusyX: Dolby Sound Tools - Developed for Nintendo 64, GameCube, Game Boy Color, and Game Boy Advance
- DivX For Games SDK - Developed for GameCube
