= Turrican =

1990 video game

- Home computer cover art by Celal Kandemiroglu
- Developers: Rainbow Arts (C64); Factor 5 (Amiga, ST); Probe Software (CPC, ZX); The Code Monkeys (MD, PCE, GB)
- Publishers: EU: Rainbow Arts; NA: Innerprise; Accolade (consoles)
- Designer: Manfred Trenz
- Composers: Chris Huelsbeck; Jochen Hippel (ST)
- Platforms: Commodore 64, Amiga, Atari ST, Amstrad CPC, ZX Spectrum, Mega Drive/Genesis, PC-Engine/TurboGrafx-16, Game Boy, CDTV
- Release: Commodore 64, Amiga: EU: 1990; NA: 1990; Atari ST, CPC, Spectrum: EU: 1990; Mega Drive/Genesis: NA: July 1991; EU: October 15, 1991; TurboGrafx-16: NA: August 1991; Game Boy: NA: November 1991; EU: November 1991
- Genre: Run and gun
- Mode: Single-player

Turrican is a 1990 run and gun video game developed by Factor 5 and published by Rainbow Arts. Designed by Manfred Trenz, it was released for the Commodore 64, and was ported to other systems later. In addition to concept design and character creation, Trenz programmed Turrican on the Commodore 64. A sequel, Turrican II: The Final Fight, followed in 1991 for the Commodore 64 and other platforms.

== Gameplay ==
Level 1 (Atari ST version)

Turrican can be described as a cross between Metroid and Psycho-Nics Oscar. While the huge levels and the morph-ball function were inspired by Metroid, the overall graphics design and weapons were inspired by Psycho-Nics Oscar. Unlike many other action games of its time, Turrican did not force the player to complete a linear level. Instead, the player can explore each level and uncover secrets.

== Plot ==
The lost colony of Alterra is a completely man-made world in a nearby galaxy, abandoned long ago. Alterra consists of five self-contained habitats, separately bio-engineered by a powerful ecosystem generation network known as a Multiple Organism Unit Link, or MORGUL for short. Early colonists used MORGUL to render Alterra habitable, but a cataclysmic earthquake severed all system interface functions, and MORGUL murderously rebelled. The few colonists lucky enough to escape told a grim tale of a higher intelligence gone berserk.

For generations, mankind sought a return to Alterra. Finally, genetic science created a saviour: Turrican, a mutant warrior, bio-engineered for the task of planetary reclamation. In the meantime, MORGUL has diligently twisted Alterran life forms to his brutal, destructive purposes. Thus, Turrican's challenges consist of eliminating hostile organisms from Alterra's five multi-level worlds and, finally, destroying the three faces of MORGUL.

== Development ==
The series started in 1989 on the Commodore 64 with a demo level of the full game which was released in 1990. Turrican became popular due to its high technical achievements, demonstrating graphics which many did not believe to be possible on a C64. Turrican was developed mainly by Manfred Trenz and published by Rainbow Arts.

Turrican was released for the Amiga, Atari ST, Amstrad CPC, ZX Spectrum and CDTV. Factor 5 handled the Amiga, Atari ST and CDTV versions, while the Amstrad CPC and ZX Spectrum were developed by Probe Software. While all of these versions were published in Europe, the Commodore versions were the only computer versions to be published in North America, by Innerprise Software. The Spectrum version of the game went to number 2 in the UK sales charts, behind Shadow Warriors.

In 1991, console ports for the Sega Mega Drive/Genesis, TurboGrafx-16 and Game Boy were handled by The Code Monkeys and published by Accolade in North America, with the Mega Drive and Game Boy versions being also released in Europe. A conversion of the game for the Atari Jaguar was under discussion by German studio Softgold, but work on the port was never stated beyond the discussional phase.

== Music ==
Chris Huelsbeck composed music for the Amiga conversions of Turrican, Turrican II and Turrican 3, as well as Mega Turrican for the Mega Drive and Super Turrican and Super Turrican 2 for the SNES. Music from Turrican II was performed live by a full orchestra at the second Symphonic Game Music Concert in 2004. The event took place in Leipzig, Germany. The music from Turrican was released in the Turrican Soundtrack Anthology on November 24, 2013, as a 4-volume digital download.

In addition, "Subsong 2" from the Commodore 64 version of Turrican, arranged by Ramiro Vaca, was copied from the song "Escape" of The Transformers: The Movie soundtrack. The title screen of Turrican is based upon the album cover Kings of Metal (1988) by the heavy metal band Manowar.

== Reception ==
Reception

Review scores
Publication	Score
Crash	94%
Sinclair User	79%
Your Sinclair	92%
MicroHobby (ES)	5/5
Zzap!64	97%
MegaTech	73%

Awards
Publication	Award
Zzap!64	Gold Medal
Crash	Crash Smash
C+VG	C+VG Hit
Amstrad Action	Mastergame

The Spectrum version was voted number 36 in the Your Sinclair Readers' Top 100 Games of All Time. The four reviewers from Mega Play gave very positive reviews for the Sega Genesis port and lauded the variety of weapons and techniques. They also praised the gameplay for having a good combination of strategy and action. One reviewer felt that Turrican is "the ultimate action game for the Genesis".

== Sequels ==
=== Turrican II: The Final Fight ===
Turrican II: The Final Fight was released in 1991. The Amiga version, done by Factor 5, was finished before the C64 version, but Manfred Trenz cites the C64 version as the original design. The game was also released for the CDTV, Atari ST, Amstrad CPC, ZX Spectrum and PC (MS-DOS). The Mega Drive/Genesis and Game Boy versions were modified into Universal Soldier, a tie in to the film of the same name. A planned Super NES version was cancelled before release.

=== Mega Turrican/Turrican 3: Payment Day ===
Mega Turrican was an original Factor 5 game initially designed for the Mega Drive/Genesis, and later followed by an Amiga port under the title of Turrican 3: Payment Day. PC (MS-DOS), Acorn Archimedes and Amiga CD32 versions were also planned and developed, but they were never released and only some enemy sprite designs have surfaced.

=== Super Turrican (NES) ===
Released for the NES, this Turrican game was created by Manfred Trenz alone. It is based roughly on the levels of the first two Turrican games.

=== Super Turrican and Super Turrican 2 (SNES) ===
The Super Turrican games were developed for the SNES by Factor 5. They were released in 1993 and 1995, respectively.

=== Unreleased games ===
Turrican 3D was intended to introduce 3D graphics in the Turrican series, but was not released because publisher THQ stopped development. The game was intended for PC (Windows) and Dreamcast. Screenshots and videos show how the world of Turrican would have looked. In an interview, Manfred Trenz, creator of Turrican, Turrican II, Super Turrican (NES) and co-developer of Turrican 3D, stated that many members of the project were far too profit-oriented, and the project failed as a result.

Thornado is another never-released Turrican spin-off. Handled by the US branch of Factor 5, they did not use the name Turrican because of legal issues. It was developed first for the Nintendo 64 and later for the GameCube. All that is available from this game is a piece of preliminary music composed by Chris Huelsbeck and some art assets that were reused in Star Wars: Rebel Strike, such as the Golden Gate-looking bridge. The "Thornado Demo" track which was released as a teaser for the then-upcoming GameCube game, was in fact running on the older Nintendo 64 sound hardware using Factor 5's new proprietary MusyX software sound engine. The Thornado demo, although not available on Factor 5's website anymore, can still be found on Chris Huelsbeck's page at GarageBand.com.

In April 2007, a Gamasutra article revealed that Factor 5 was working on concepts for a new Turrican game. The game did not have a title yet and was known as Turrican or Project cyclone. Since the game was being planned once again by the US branch of Factor 5 and they went bankrupt not long after, this game was not released.

=== Turrican Flashback ===
The Amiga versions of Turrican and Turrican II along with Mega Turrican and Super Turrican were re-released in 2020 for the PlayStation 4 and Nintendo Switch under the title Turrican Flashback to commemorate the 30th anniversary of the original game. These versions feature various mods such as the ability to rewind the action to correct mistakes, modify the visuals to better simulate the CRT type displays used by players at the time and input cheat codes.

=== The Turrican Collection ===
The Turrican Collection for the Evercade was released on February 27, 2026. The cartridge contains eight games and two bonus games which include Turrican, Turrican II: The Final Fight, Turrican 3, Mega Turrican, Mega Turrican: Director's Cut, Super Turrican, Super Turrican: Director's Cut,Super Turrican 2, Mega Turrican: Score Attack and Super Turrican: Score Attack. A trailer was also released on YouTube.
