= Julian Eggebrecht =

German video game businessman (born 1968/1969)

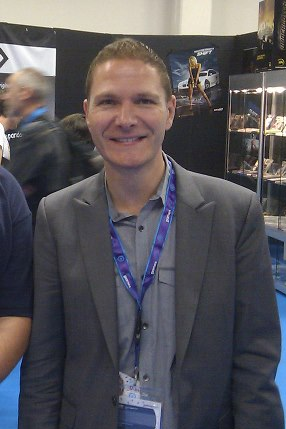
- Julian Eggebrecht at Gamescom 2012
- Born: 1968 or 1969 (age 57–58)
- Occupations: Video game producer, director
- Known for: Co-founder of Factor 5

Julian Eggebrecht (born 1968 or 1969) is a German video game businessman. He is notable for having been one of the founding members and creative director of Factor 5, a German-American game development company.

== Career ==
Eggebrecht co-founded Factor 5 in Germany in 1987 and moved the company to California in 1996 for the purpose of closer working with its largest partner, LucasArts.

He was key in Factor 5 becoming Nintendo's technology partner, supplying the Nintendo 64 audio development software; and in the fundamental development of the GameCube and Wii console hardware and software. He was a member of the Sony PS3 Edge toolset group. He led Factor 5's teams to pioneer many technological advancements in video game audiovisual technology such as MusyX (originally called MOsys FX Surround), with collaboration with Dolby Labs, THX, and AMD (then known as ATI).

His games include the Turrican and Star Wars Rogue Squadron series, Indiana Jones' Greatest Adventures, and ports of International Superstar Soccer Deluxe and Contra III: The Alien Wars. He also served on the board of the IGDA of the Game Developers Conference.

Between 1993 and 2000, he was a freelancer for the German version of the video game magazine Total!.

At the 2007 Games Convention Developers Conference, Eggebrecht criticized the ESRB for random processing in the guidelines to the development of Lair, and called for improvement to the system.

Factor 5 closed in 2008 due to financial issues. In 2010, Eggebrecht and other former Factor 5 employees founded the mobile game studio TouchFactor. Factor 5 was resurrected in 2017, and it reacquired the rights to the Turrican franchise.

In 2019 Eggebrecht joined Epic Games as Director of Online Technology.
