= Emergency (video game) =

1998 video game

Emergency: Fighters for Life
- Developer: Sixteen Tons Entertainment
- Publishers: NA: WizardWorks; EU: ASCII Entertainment
- Director: Ralph Stock
- Producer: Ralph Stock
- Programmer: Andreas Epple
- Series: Emergency
- Platform: Microsoft Windows
- Release: EU: 1998; NA: June 5, 1998 (online); NA: August 1998 (retail)
- Genre: Tactical role-playing game
- Mode: Single-player

Emergency: Fighters for Life, also known as simply Emergency, is a tactical role-playing video game developed for Microsoft Windows in 1998. Four sequels have been released: Emergency 2, Emergency 3, Emergency 4, and Emergency 5.

== Gameplay ==
The player receives a series of missions to complete involving the rescue of injured and endangered civilians, extinguishing fires, and arresting any violators of the law. Scenarios include: an accident at a race track, a plane crash, a flood, a traffic accident and a bomb threat, as well as scenarios based on true events such as the Ramstein air show disaster.

== Reception ==
Reception

Aggregate score
Aggregator	Score
GameRankings	50%

Review scores
Publication	Score
Computer Games Strategy Plus	3.5/5
Computer Gaming World	3/5
GamePro	4/5
GameSpot	4.6/10
GameStar	56%
Next Generation	2/5
PC Gamer (US)	45%
PC Zone	37%

The game received mixed reviews according to the review aggregation website GameRankings. Next Generation said, "As a whole, Emergency shows promise but has too many individual flaws to be a worthwhile purchase. The developers should be commended for an original idea, but the execution is poor. We hope they've learned from their mistakes and their next effort will be a bit more polished."
