= Sixteen Tons Entertainment =

German video game developer

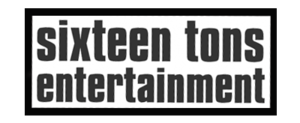
- Trade name: Sixteen Tons Entertainment
- Type: Subsidiary
- Industry: Video game industry
- Founded: 1993; 33 years ago
- Founder: Ralph Stock
- Headquarters: Tübingen, Germany
- Key people: Jan Richter (CEO)
- Parent: Phoenix Games Holding GmbH (2020–present)
- Website: www.sixteen-tons.de

Sixteen Tons Entertainment is the principal video game label of Promotion Software GmbH, a German video game developer headquartered in Tübingen, with an additional office in Berlin. Founded by game designer Ralph Stock in 1993, the studio is best known for developing the Emergency series. Phoenix Games acquired Promotion Software and Sixteen Tons Entertainment in January 2020.

== History ==
Game designer Ralph Stock founded Promotion Software in Tübingen in 1993. Sixteen Tons Entertainment subsequently became the company's principal label for commercial video games. During the 1990s, the developer worked on promotional games and business simulation games including Caribbean Disaster and Mad News.

The company released the first game in the Emergency series in 1998. The series centres on managing emergency services such as the police, fire brigade and medical rescue services, and became the developer's best-known property. The free-to-play mobile game Emergency HQ was released in 2018 and received more than six million installations during its first year, according to Phoenix Games.

A second studio was established in Babelsberg, near Potsdam, in 2009. That office was subsequently relocated to Berlin.

On 15 January 2020, Phoenix Games announced that it had acquired Promotion Software and Sixteen Tons Entertainment. The acquisition included the company's operations in Tübingen and Berlin.

Stock continued to lead the studio after the acquisition. On 1 August 2024, he stepped down as chief executive officer and was succeeded by Jan Richter, formerly head of product and design at ZeptoLab.

== Games ==
=== Emergency series ===
Sixteen Tons Entertainment has developed numerous entries in the Emergency series, including:

- Emergency: Fighters for Life (1998)
- Emergency 2: The Ultimate Fight for Life (2002)
- Emergency 3: Mission Life (2005)
- Emergency 4: Global Fighters for Life (2006)
- Emergency 2012: The Quest for Peace (2010)
- Emergency 5 (2014)
- Emergency 2016 (2015)
- Emergency 2017 (2016)
- Emergency 20 (2017)
- Emergency HQ (2018)
- Emergency (2023)

=== Other games ===
Other games associated with Promotion Software or the Sixteen Tons Entertainment label include:

- Mad TV
- Caribbean Disaster
- Hurra Deutschland
- Mad News
- Mad News: Extrablatt
- Der Stein der Weisen
- Gotcha! Extreme Paintball
- The Show
- Ben Hur Live: Das legendäre Wagenrennen
- Einfach Genial 2.0
- Keltis: Der Weg der Steine

The developer also produced educational games based on the German television programme Willi wills wissen.
