= Got to Dance =

British television dance competition

- Genre: Dance competition
- Presented by: Davina McCall
- Judges: Ashley Banjo; Adam Garcia (2009–2012, 2014); Kimberly Wyatt; Aston Merrygold (2013)
- Country of origin: United Kingdom
- Original language: English
- No. of series: 5
- No. of episodes: 71 (inc. 5 "Warm Up" shows)

Production
- Production locations: Auditions: Various cities (2010–2012); Clapham Common (2013); Roundhouse (2014); Live shows: Pinewood Studios (2010–2012); Shepperton Studios (2013); Earls Court (2014); Final: Olympia, London (2011–2013); Earls Court (2014)
- Running time: 30–90 mins
- Production companies: Shine TV and Princess Productions

Original release
- Network: Sky One
- Release: 20 December 2009 – 28 December 2014

Related
- Got to Dance: Auditions Uncut; International versions

Got to Dance, originally titled Just Dance, is a British dance competition that was broadcast on Sky One in the United Kingdom from 20 December 2009 to 28 December 2014. Auditions for the show were held in specially built "Dance Domes" and are open to all dance acts of any age, style or size but must be of an amateur level.

The show was hosted by Davina McCall, with Ashley Banjo and Kimberly Wyatt as judges. In series 1 to 3, Adam Garcia was a judge but was replaced by Aston Merrygold in series 4. However, on 31 January 2014, Merrygold announced that he would be leaving the show. Garcia returned as a judge for series 5 in 2014. Since series 2, the prize money is £250,000 for the winning act. On 24 October 2014, it was announced that series 5 would be the last.

== Format ==
There were five stages to the competition:

- Stage 1: Producers' auditions (these auditions decide who will perform in front of the judges, but they are not broadcast or acknowledged on the show)
- Stage 2: Judges' auditions
- Stage 3: Callbacks (some acts may have to perform again at this stage for a place in the semi-finals)
- Stage 4: Live Semi-finals (each act performs in one semi-final, with only two advancing to the final, three in series 5)
- Stage 5: Live Final

=== Voting ===
Viewers in both Ireland and the United Kingdom could vote via Phone, Red Button (through Sky TV only) or via the official iPhone application, which was introduced in the second series. Viewers could vote for free using the Got to Dance website, which was introduced in the fourth series.

== Series overview ==
Series	Year(s)	Time	Main presenter	Judges	Winner (dance style)	Prize money
1	2010	January–February	Davina McCall	Ashley Banjo; Adam Garcia; Kimberly Wyatt	Akai Osei (Street)	£100,000
2	2011	January–February	Davina McCall	Ashley Banjo; Adam Garcia; Kimberly Wyatt	Chris and Wes (Street)	£250,000
3	2012	January–March	Davina McCall	Ashley Banjo; Adam Garcia; Kimberly Wyatt	Prodijig (Irish stepdance)	£250,000
4	2013	January–March	Davina McCall	Ashley Banjo; Kimberly Wyatt; Aston Merrygold	Lukas McFarlane (Contemporary)	£250,000
5	2014	August	Davina McCall	Ashley Banjo; Kimberly Wyatt; Adam Garcia	Duplic8 (Street) (mentored by Adam Garcia)	£250,000

== Series 1 (2010) ==
Auditions for the first series were held in October 2009 in Edinburgh, Manchester and London.

The winning act, 10-year-old Akai, won the £100,000 prize money.

=== Semi-finalists ===
- Jukebox Juniors from Ely
- Bhangra Heads from Coventry
- Emily from Edinburgh
- Parallel from Uxbridge
- Status from Leeds
- Martin Sierra from Norway
- Kane Ricca from St Albans
- Raw Edge from Blanchardstown
- Beyond Repair from London
- MJ Latin from Preston
- DNA from Telford
- Matthew Koon from Whitefield
- Dance Dynamix from Liverpool
- Fancy Feet from Dungannon
- The Box from Glasgow
- Unity Youth from East London
- Eclipse from Cardiff
- Akai Osei from Lambeth

=== Semi-finals ===
The live semi-finals for Got to Dance 2010 began on Sunday 24 January 2010. There were six acts in each live semi-final (18 in total). Each act performed in one semi-final each with only 2 advancing to the final. The judges awarded gold stars to the acts they believed deserved a place in the final and red stars to the ones who have not quite delivered the performance that they were hoping for.

==== Semi Final 1 (24 January) ====
Order	Contestant(s)	Song(s) performed to	Stars			Result
Order	Contestant(s)	Song(s) performed to	Adam	Kimberly	Ashley	Result
1	Jukebox Juniors	"Let's Groove" by Earth, Wind & Fire "Around the World" by Daft Punk "Wake Me Up Before You Go-Go" by Wham! "Breakin'... There's No Stopping Us" by Ollie & Jerry "Jump" by Kris Kross	★	★	★	Advanced
2	Bhangra Heads	"Heer" by Jags Klimax	★	★	★	Eliminated
3	Emily	"Uninvited" by Alanis Morissette	★	★	★	Advanced
4	Parallel	"The Fresh Prince of Bel-Air" by DJ Jazzy Jeff & The Fresh Prince "Bonkers" by Dizzee Rascal "It's Not Unusual" by Tom Jones "U Can't Touch This" by MC Hammer	★	★	★	Eliminated
5	Status	"Forever" by Chris Brown "The Unbirthday Song" from Alice in Wonderland "Push Up" by Freestylers	★	★	★	Eliminated
6	Martin Sierra	"Paparazzi" by Lady Gaga "Hung Up" by Madonna "Hey Ya!" by Outkast "Fighter" by Christina Aguilera	★	★	★	Eliminated

==== Semi Final 2 (31 January) ====
Order	Contestant(s)	Song(s) performed to	Stars			Result
Order	Contestant(s)	Song(s) performed to	Adam	Kimberly	Ashley	Result
1	Kane Ricca	"Somebody Told Me" by The Killers	★	★	★	Eliminated
2	Raw Edge	"Main Title (Theme From 'Jaws')" from Jaws "Street Player" by Chicago	★	★	★	Eliminated
3	Beyond Repair		★	★	★	Eliminated
4	MJ Latin	"The Way You Make Me Feel" by Michael Jackson "Wanna Be Startin' Somethin'" by Michael Jackson "Don't Stop 'til You Get Enough" by Michael Jackson	★	★	★	Advanced
5	DNA	"Gossip Folks" by Missy Elliott feat Ludacris	★	★	★	Eliminated
6	Matthew Koon	"Stop and Stare" by OneRepublic	★	★	★	Advanced

==== Semi-final 3 (7 February) ====
Order	Contestant(s)	Song(s) performed to	Stars			Result
Order	Contestant(s)	Song(s) performed to	Adam	Kimberly	Ashley	Result
1	Dance Dynamix	"Tik Tok" by Ke$ha; Evacuate the Dancefloor" by Cascada	★	★	★	Eliminated
2	Fancy Feet	"Hot n Cold" by Katy Perry	★	★	★	Eliminated
3	The Box	"Hallelujah" by Alexandra Burke	★	★	★	Advanced
4	Unity Youth	"Spaceman" by Babylon Zoo "Star Wars Theme" from Star Wars	★	★	★	Eliminated
5	Eclipse	"Do Your Thing" by Basement Jaxx	★	★	★	Eliminated
6	Akai	"Pump It Up" by Joe Budden "P.Y.T. (Pretty Young Thing)" by Michael Jackson "Lose Control" by Missy Elliott	★	★	★	Advanced

==== Live Final (14 February) ====
Order	Contestant(s)	Song(s) performed to	Number of Gold stars	Result
1	Emily	"Cry Me a River" by Michael Bublé "Run" by Leona Lewis	★★★	Eliminated
2	MJ Latin	"I Want You Back" by Jackson 5 "The Love You Save" by Jackson 5 "Rockin' Robin" by Michael Jackson	★	Eliminated
3	The Box	"Don't Stop Believin'" by Journey	★★	Top 3
4	Akai Osei	"Apache" "Freeze" by T-Pain "It Takes Two" by Rob Base and DJ E-Z Rock	★★★	Winner
5	Matthew Koon	"Beautiful Day" by U2	★★★	Eliminated
6	Jukebox Juniors	"Ease On down the Road" from The Wiz "I Can Make You Dance" by Zapp "Robot Rock" by Daft Punk	★★★	Top 3

== Series 2 (2011) ==
A second series of Got to Dance began with a special "Warm Up" show that was broadcast on 19 December 2010 then fully on 2 January 2011. The prize money for the second series was £250,000, the largest cash give-away on a television talent show (at the time).

The format of the second series of Got to Dance was slightly different to the first series. There were eight audition shows followed by four live semi-finals, and a live final at Olympia, London on 27 February 2011 in front of an audience of 6,000 people. The dance dome auditions for the series were held in Glasgow, Dublin & London.

The winning act, Chris and Wes, won the £250,000 prize money.

=== Callbacks ===
At the Callbacks, the judges could not decide between eight of the acts so they organised a dance-off to fill the last four semi-final places. The acts in each category had to "face-off" their opponent with one dance; the judges then decided the winner of the each "face-off" and that act went through to the live semi-finals.

The eight acts in the dance-off were:

- Alleviate (won) vs Sean and Stacey,
- Dance Dynamix (won) vs Frameous,
- Lauren Hair (won) vs Natalie,
- Addam McMillian vs Crazy Popper (paired as duo named Liquid Metallic)

=== Semi Finalists ===
- Alleviate from Flintshire & London
- Back2Back from Wolverhampton
- Bolly-Flex from Tower Hamlets
- Cerebro from Tottenham
- Chris & Wes from Hayes
- Damhsa Dreams from Geashill
- Dance Dynamix from Liverpool
- Ella from Cornwall
- Elmes 3 Style from Southend-on-Sea
- Eruption from Port Talbot
- Ghetto Fabulous from Dublin
- Guyz in Sync from Walthamstow
- Lauren from Greenock
- Liquid Metallic from various places
- Luke from Mansfield
- Mystic Force from Galway
- Octavia from Romania
- Podilya from Manchester
- QMX from Nottingham
- Razzle Dazzle from Belfast
- Shockarellas from Trafford
- Synergy from Southampton
- Tamara from Musselburgh
- Tap Attack from various places
- Trilogy from South London
- Trinity Warriors from Derby
- Turbo from London
- Two's Company from Belfast

=== Semi-finals ===
The live semi-finals for Got to Dance 2011 began on Sunday 30 January 2011. There were seven acts in each live semi-final (28 in total). Each act performed in one semi-final each with only 2 advancing to the final. The judges awarded gold stars to the acts they believed deserved a place in the final.

==== Semi-final 1 (30 January) ====
Order	Contestant(s)	Song(s) performed to	Stars			Result
Order	Contestant(s)	Song(s) performed to	Adam	Kimberly	Ashley	Result
1	Cerebro	"She's Got That Vibe" by R. Kelly "DJ Got Us Fallin' in Love" by Usher "Workin' Day and Night" by Michael Jackson "Wannabe" by Spice Girls "U Can't Touch This" by MC Hammer	★	★	★	Eliminated
2	Podilya		★	★	★	Eliminated
3	Luke	"Barcelona" by Freddie Mercury	★	★	★	Eliminated
4	Chris and Wes	"Billie Jean" by Michael Jackson "Like I Love You" by Justin Timberlake "Ante Up" by M.O.P. "Mysterious Girl" by Peter Andre "Red Alert" by Basement Jaxx	★	★	★	Advanced
5	Eruption	"Don't Stop 'til You Get Enough" by Michael Jackson "Yeah Yeah" by Bodyrox feat. Luciana "Whip My Hair" by Willow	★	★	★	Eliminated
6	Alleviate	"Love the Way You Lie" by Rihanna	★	★	★	Advanced
7	Ghetto Fabulous	"She Wants To Move" by N.E.R.D. "On to the Next One" by Jay-Z "Sweet Dreams (Are Made of This)" by Marilyn Manson	★	★	★	Eliminated

==== Semi-final 2 (6 February) ====
Order	Contestant(s)	Song(s) performed to	Stars			Result
Order	Contestant(s)	Song(s) performed to	Adam	Kimberly	Ashley	Result
1	Shockarellas	"Ching-a-Ling" by Missy Elliott "Get Ur Freak On" by Missy Elliott "Lick Shots" by Missy Elliott	★	★	★	Eliminated
2	Guys in Sync	"Don't Stop Me Now" by Queen	★	★	★	Eliminated
3	Damhsa Dreams	"Siamsa" by Ronan Hardiman	★	★	★	Eliminated
4	QMX	"1999" by Prince "My Humps" by Black Eyed Peas "Rule the World" by Take That	★	★	★	Eliminated
5	Ella	"Your Song" by Ellie Goulding	★	★	★	Eliminated
6	Turbo	"I Feel for You" by Chaka Khan "Touch It" by Busta Rhymes "Day 'n' Nite" by Kid Cudi vs Crookers	★	★	★	Advanced
7	Dance Dynamix	"Beautiful Monster" by Ne-Yo "Take Over Control" by Afrojack feat Eva Simons	★	★	★	Advanced

==== Semi-final 3 (13 February) ====
Order	Contestant(s)	Song(s) performed to	Stars			Result
Order	Contestant(s)	Song(s) performed to	Adam	Kimberly	Ashley	Result
1	Elmes 3 Style	"Supermassive Black Hole" by Muse	★	★	★	Eliminated
2	Octavia	"Nara" by E.S. Posthumus	★	★	★	Eliminated
3	Trilogy	"Closer" by Ne-Yo "It's Raining Men" by The Weather Girls; The Way I Are"—Timbaland feat. Keri Hilson	★	★	★	Eliminated
4	Tap Attack	"Spybreak!" by Propellerheads	★	★	★	Eliminated
5	Two's Company	"Illuminated" by Hurts	★	★	★	Advanced
6	Back2Back	"Hotel Room Service" by Pitbull "Kaun-Nee-Jaandah" by PBN	★	★	★	Eliminated
7	Lauren	"Make You Feel My Love" by Adele	★	★	★	Advanced

==== Semi-final 4 (20 February) ====
Order	Contestant(s)	Song(s) performed to	Stars			Result
Order	Contestant(s)	Song(s) performed to	Adam	Kimberly	Ashley	Result
1	Tamara	"Drumming Song" by Florence and the Machine "You've Got the Love" by Florence and the Machine	★	★	★	Eliminated
2	Mystic Force	"Rude Boy" by Rihanna (cover)	★	★	★	Eliminated
3	Liquid Metallic	"Where’s My Money (Caspa Remix)" by TC "Harder, Better, Faster, Stronger" by Daft Punk	★	★	★	Eliminated
4	Synergy	"Let's Get Loud" by Jennifer Lopez	★	★	★	Eliminated
5	Razzle Dazzle	"The Salmon Dance" (Crookers 'Wow' Mix) by The Chemical Brothers "My Heart Will Go On" by Celine Dion "Rock That Body" by Black Eyed Peas "We R Who We R" by Kesha	★	★	★	Advanced
6	Bolly-Flex		★	★	★	Eliminated
7	Trinity Warriors	"Jump Around" by House of Pain "Pass Out" by Tinie Tempah	★	★	★	Advanced

=== Final ===
The live final was 90 minutes long (taking place at Olympia) and featured the eight dance acts that made it through the semi-finals as well as a special performance from 2010's winner Akai Osei and dance troupe Diversity. After the acts performed there was a 6-minute window for voting. For the first time in a UK entertainment program, viewers could vote using a specially designed application for the iPhone, iPad and iPod Touch.

==== Live Final (27 February) ====
Order	Contestant(s)	Song(s) performed to	Number of Gold stars	Result
1	Razzle Dazzle	"Fancy Footwork" by Chromeo "Ice Ice Baby" by Vanilla Ice "Born This Way" by Lady Gaga	★★	Top 3
2	Lauren	"Who You Are" by Jessie J	★★	Eliminated
3	Chris and Wes	One More Time" by Daft Punk "Just the Two of Us" by Will Smith "Anyway" by Duck Sauce "Don't Cha" by Pussycat Dolls "One" by Swedish House Mafia	★★★	Winners
4	Dance Dynamix	"Hold It Against Me" by Britney Spears	★	Eliminated
5	Turbo	I Need Air by Magnetic Man feat Angela Hunte	★★★	Eliminated
6	Two's Company	"Fix You" by Coldplay		Eliminated
7	Trinity Warriors	"Rockin to the Beat" by Black Eyed Peas "American Boy" by Estelle "Kids That Love to Dance" by Professor Green feat Emeli Sandé	★★	Eliminated
8	Alleviate	"Someone Like You" by Adele	★★★	Top 3

== Series 3 (2012) ==
Series 3 started on 1 January 2012. Producer auditions took place during July & August 2011 in Glasgow, Newcastle, Liverpool, Manchester, Cardiff, Birmingham, Bristol, London and Dublin. Filming took place in various stages from July 2011 – March 2012. The dance domes auditions again took place in London, Glasgow and Dublin.

A special "Warm Up" show was broadcast on 18 December 2011. The series fully began on 1 January 2012, with the next episode the following day. Seven audition shows were aired followed by a "Home Visits" episode and one 30-minute episode featuring the "Callback" performances.

A new show, Got to Dance: Auditions Uncut aired weekdays at 6pm and was narrated by Will Best. As the name suggests, the show featured uncut auditions from the main show and others which were not shown.

The winning act, Prodijig, won the £250,000 prize money.

=== Semi-finals ===
The live semi-finals for Got to Dance 2012 began on Sunday 29 January 2012. Five semi-finals took place, instead of four as previously. In total, 30 acts advanced to the semi-finals in 2012.

==== Semi-finalists ====
- Unity UK from East London
- Project G from Croydon
- Sam from South Benfleet
- A Hoofer's Song from Worthing
- Hippy-Jo from Halesowen
- Fear of the Unknown from Glasgow
- Urban Jokers from Doncaster
- Lindsey & Ryan from Norbury
- Luke from Mansfield
- Sapnay from Harrow
- Methods of Movement from Dagenham
- Boadicea from various places
- Lil Hustlers from Dublin
- Chuck from Urmston
- Supermalcom from London
- Brosena from Bristol
- Tayluer & Elliott from Liverpool
- Antics from Solihull
- Bendy Kate from Bristol
- Olivia from Yorkshire
- Sweet Surprise from Cambuslang
- The Future from York
- Rikoshay from Watford
- Lloyd & Rebecca from Ystrad Mynach & West Midlands
- A Team from various places
- Kazzum from Bedford
- Belle from Herne Bay
- Prodijig from Cork
- Dharmz from Leicester
- Reflection from Bournemouth

==== Semi-final 1 (29 January) ====
Order	Contestant(s)	Song(s) performed to	Stars			Result
Order	Contestant(s)	Song(s) performed to	Adam	Kimberly	Ashley	Result
1	Chuck	"Moves like Jagger" by Maroon 5 feat Christina Aguilera "Gold Dust" by DJ Fresh	★	★	★	Eliminated
2	Tayluer & Elliot	"Wherever You Will Go" by Charlene Soraia	★	★	★	Advanced
3	Project G	"S&M" by Rihanna	★	★	★	Eliminated
4	Bendy Kate	"Heartlines" by Florence and the Machine	★	★	★	Eliminated
5	Sam	"It's Just Begun" by Jimmy Castor Bunch " Club Can't Handle Me" by Flo Rida feat David Guetta "Changed the Way You Kiss Me" by Example "Boogie Wonderland" by Earth, Wind and Fire	★	★	★	Eliminated
6	Prodijig	"Beautiful People" by Chris Brown feat Benny Benassi	★	★	★	Advanced

==== Semi-final 2 (5 February) ====
Order	Contestant(s)	Song(s) performed to	Stars			Result
Order	Contestant(s)	Song(s) performed to	Adam	Kimberly	Ashley	Result
1	Fear of the Unknown		★	★	★	Advanced
2	Urban Jokers	"What Makes You Beautiful" by One Direction "We Found Love" by Rihanna feat Calvin Harris; All of the Lights by Kanye West feat Rihanna	★	★	★	Eliminated
3	Luke	"Lego House" by Ed Sheeran	★	★	★	Eliminated
4	A Hoofer's Song	"Take Five" by Dave Brubeck Quartet	★	★	★	Eliminated
5	Sapnay	"Jai Ho" by A. R. Rahman	★	★	★	Eliminated
6	Boadicea	"Ring the Alarm" by Beyoncé "End of Time" by Beyoncé	★	★	★	Advanced

==== Semi-final 3 (12 February) ====
Order	Contestant(s)	Song(s) performed to	Stars			Result
Order	Contestant(s)	Song(s) performed to	Adam	Kimberly	Ashley	Result
1	Lil Hustlers	"H.A.P.P.Y. Radio" by Edwin Starr "Material Girl" by Madonna "Baby Got Back" by Sir Mix-a-Lot "Push It" by Salt-N-Pepa "Video Killed the Radio Star" by the Buggles	★	★	★	Eliminated
2	Supermalcom	"Young'n (Holla Back)" by Fabolous "Head, Shoulders, Kneez & Toez" by K.I.G	★	★	★	Eliminated
3	Sweet Surprise	"Shout" by Lulu "Angel" by Sarah McLachlan "Are You Gonna Go My Way" by Lenny Kravitz	★	★	★	Advanced
4	Brosena	"Children" by Robert Miles	★	★	★	Eliminated
5	Antics	"Judas" by Lady Gaga "Riverside" by Sidney Samson "Sweet Dreams" by Beyoncé "E.T." by Katy Perry ft. Kanye West"	★	★	★	Advanced
6	Olivia	"Wonderful" by Annie Lennox	★	★	★	Eliminated

==== Semi-final 4 (19 February) ====
Order	Contestant(s)	Song(s) performed to	Stars			Result
Order	Contestant(s)	Song(s) performed to	Adam	Kimberly	Ashley	Result
1	A Team	"Do It Like a Dude" by Jessie J	★	★	★	Advanced
2	Hippy-Joe	"People Help the People" by Birdy	★	★	★	Eliminated
3	The Future	"Defiance" by Tom Player "Till the World Ends" by Britney Spears	★	★	★	Eliminated
4	Rikoshay	"What's Your Flava?" by Craig David "Freeze" by T-Pain "We Are Here to Change the World" by Michael Jackson	★	★	★	Eliminated
5	Lloyd & Rebecca	"Levels" "Set Fire to the Rain" by Adele "Runaway Baby" by Bruno Mars	★	★	★	Eliminated
6	Methods of Movement		★	★	★	Advanced

==== Semi-final 5 (26 February) ====
Order	Contestant(s)	Song(s) performed to	Stars			Result
Order	Contestant(s)	Song(s) performed to	Adam	Kimberly	Ashley	Result
1	Kazzum		★	★	★	Advanced
2	Lindsay & Ryan		★	★	★	Eliminated
3	Belle		★	★	★	Eliminated
4	Unity UK		★	★	★	Advanced
5	Reflection		★	★	★	Eliminated
6	Dharmz		★	★	★	Eliminated

=== Final ===
The live final took place at Olympia in front of 6,000 people on 4 March 2012.

==== Live Final (4 March) ====
Order	Contestant(s)	Number of Gold stars	Result
1	Antics	★★	Eliminated
2	Tayluer & Elliott	★★★	Top 3
3	Boadicea	★★★	Eliminated
4	Fear of the Unknown	★★★	Top 3
5	Kazzum		Eliminated
6	Sweet Surprise	★★	Eliminated
7	Methods of Movement	★★★	Eliminated
8	Prodijig	★★★	Winners
9	A Team		Eliminated
10	Unity UK	★★★	Eliminated

== Series 4 (2013) ==
Series 4 started in January 2013. Producer auditions took place during July and August 2012. This year, auditions in front of the judges took place at Clapham Common in London. No judges' auditions were held in Glasgow or Dublin. The auditions took place between 13 September and 2 October 2012, in a brand new and bigger dome which can hold up to 760 audience members.

Starting in this series, all acts must receive 3 gold stars from the judges to progress onto the shortlist.

Aston Merrygold replaced Garcia on the judging panel. Jordan Banjo and Perri Kiely were the backstage team for series 4. They also provided the voice overs for many of the episodes of Got to Dance: Auditions Uncut.

Producer audition dates:

Date(s)	City
28–29 July 2012	Manchester
30 July 2012	Liverpool
2 August 2012	Newcastle
4–6 August 2012	London
8 August 2012	Glasgow
11 August 2012	Dublin
16 August 2012	Birmingham
17 August 2012	Bristol
18 August 2012	Cardiff
19 August 2012	London
26 August 2012	London

=== Semi-finals ===
The live semi-finals for Got to Dance 2013 began on Sunday 10 February 2013. Five semi-finals took place, with six acts performing in each for one of two places in the Grand Final on 17 March.

==== Semi-finalists ====
	Semi-final 1 (10 February)	Semi-final 2 (17 February)	Semi-final 3 (24 February)	Semi-final 4 (3 March)	Semi-final 5 (10 March)
Contestants eliminated	Notorious; Dance For Joy; Molly and Vitaly; Collective Ent.	Buckness Personified; Mechanikool; Momentum; Pulse Collective	G-Nome; Hash Tap; Poison; Wild G	Javier and Julie; Amour; Gaana Rajas; One Step Ahead	Juicy; Leon and Dotty; Mindtrick; Shun
Advanced to Final	Lukas McFarlane; Tom Hughes-Lloyd	Rhys Yeomans; Mini Moves	Rory O’Shea; IMD (Intelligent Minds Dance)	Antics; Godson	Gymtasia Evolution; Ruff Diamond

=== Final ===
The live final took place at Olympia in front of 6,000 people on 17 March 2013.

==== Live Final (17 March) ====
Order	Contestant(s)	Number of Gold stars	Result
1	Mini Moves	★★★	Eliminated
2	Lukas McFarlane	★★★	Winner
3	IMD	★	Eliminated
4	Gymtasia Evolution	★	Top 3
5	Rory	★	Eliminated
6	Tom	★★★	Eliminated
7	Antics	★	Eliminated
8	Rhys	★★★	Eliminated
9	Godson	★★	Eliminated
10	Ruff Diamond	★★★	Top 3

== Series 5 (2014) ==
Series 5 began airing on 9 August 2014, with McCall continuing as host. Banjo and Wyatt returned as judges for a fifth time and Garcia returned after his absence in series 4, replacing Merrygold. In this series, the semi-finals were stripped across one week (similar to Britain's Got Talent) and the judges mentored contestants throughout the competition. Six acts from each team progressed to the live rounds. Auditions for this series took place at the Roundhouse concert venue in Camden, London between 6–11 May 2014. This is the first and only time that the dance domes have not been used. Series 2 winners Chris and Wes returned to Got to Dance and were joined by Joe Sugg to form the Backstage/Online team.

Producer auditions for Got to Dance 2014 took place during March and April 2014 in London, Birmingham, Cardiff, Manchester, Newcastle, Glasgow and Dublin.

Producer audition dates:

Date(s)	City
15 March 2014	Dublin
23 March 2014	London
25 March 2014	Glasgow
27 March 2014	Newcastle
29–30 March 2014	Manchester
3 April 2014	London
5 April 2014	Birmingham
6 April 2014	Cardiff
12–13 April 2014	London

=== Semi-finalists ===
The following 18 acts made it to the live shows:

Team Ashley (25 August 2014)	Team Kimberly (26 August 2014)	Team Adam (27 August 2014)
Rella Nation; Dance Illusion; Turbo & Godson; Boyband; Bitter Harvest; Sharifa	Original Kidz; Kaner Flex; Kofi; Academy of Base; Kaine Ward; IMD	Duplic8; Unity Academy; Dan-I & Sia; Freddie Huddleston; UnTitled; Nicholas Marvel

=== Finalists ===
The following 9 acts made it to the live final on 29 August 2014:

Key: – Winning judge/team. Winner is in bold, eliminated contestants in small font.

Team Ashley	Team Kimberly	Team Adam
Dance Illusion; Boyband; Bitter Harvest	Original Kidz; Kaine Ward; IMD	**Duplic8**; Unity Academy; Dan-I & Sia

== Got to Dance bursary fund ==
The second series saw the introduction of the bursary fund. This fund, worth £15,000, was to be distributed amongst auditionees that the judges felt weren't yet good enough to progress in the competition, but who they felt had real potential, and was to be used to enable them to develop and cultivate their dance skills through professional tuition.

== Transmissions ==
=== Warm-up shows ===
Air date
20 December 2009
19 December 2010
18 December 2011
23 December 2012
27 July 2014

=== Original series ===
Series	Start date	End date	Episodes
1	3 January 2010	14 February 2010	8
2	2 January 2011	27 February 2011	15
3	1 January 2012	4 March 2012	16
4	6 January 2013	17 March 2013	15
5	9 August 2014	29 August 2014	11

== Ratings ==
Episode ratings from BARB. They do not include viewings on Sky 1 +1.

=== Series 1 ===
Episode no.	Airdate	Total viewers	Sky1 Weekly Ranking
1	20 December 2009	—N/a	—N/a
2	3 January 2010	1,096,000	2
3	3 January 2010	1,313,000	1
4	10 January 2010	963,000	1
5	17 January 2010	920,000	1
6	24 January 2010	1,109,000	2
7	31 January 2010	978,000	3
8	7 February 2010	1,218,000	3
9	14 February 2010	1,354,000	1

=== Series 2 ===
Episode no.	Airdate	Total viewers	Sky1 Weekly Ranking
1	19 December 2010	—N/a	—N/a
2	2 January 2011	1,104,000	2
3	2 January 2011	1,336,000	1
4	9 January 2011	1,127,000	1
5	9 January 2011	986,000	2
6	16 January 2011	1,248,000	1
7	16 January 2011	1,047,000	2
8	23 January 2011	1,001,000	1
9	23 January 2011	922,000	2
10	23 January 2011	820,000	3
11	30 January 2011	1,327,000	1
12	6 February 2011	1,284,000	1
13	13 February 2011	1,081,000	2
14	20 February 2011	1,284,000	2
15	27 February 2011	1,298,000	3
16	27 February 2011	1,376,000	2

=== Series 3 ===
Episode no.	Airdate	Total viewers	Sky1 Weekly Ranking
1	18 December 2011	—N/a	—N/a
2	1 January 2012	983,000	4
3	2 January 2012	766,000	6
4	8 January 2012	1,034,000	4
5	8 January 2012	792,000	5
6	15 January 2012	959,000	3
7	15 January 2012	795,000	4
8	22 January 2012	1,145,000	3
9	22 January 2012	742,000	5
10	22 January 2012	635,000	7
11	29 January 2012	1,264,000	2
12	5 February 2012	1,064,000	5
13	12 February 2012	1,048,000	4
14	19 February 2012	898,000	4
15	26 February 2012	766,000	4
16	4 March 2012	1,206,000	1
17	4 March 2012	1,197,000	2

=== Series 4 ===
Episode no.	Airdate	Total viewers	Sky1 Weekly Ranking
1	23 December 2012	—N/a	—N/a
2	6 January 2013	908,000	4
3	6 January 2013	947,000	2
4	13 January 2013	801,000	5
5	13 January 2013	847,000	3
6	20 January 2013	716,000	4
7	20 January 2013	692,000	5
8	27 January 2013	705,000	5
9	3 February 2013	627,000	5
10	10 February 2013	868,000	3
11	17 February 2013	884,000	4
12	24 February 2013	677,000	5
13	3 March 2013	655,000	5
14	10 March 2013	513,000	8
15	17 March 2013	930,000	3
16	17 March 2013	1,131,000	1

=== Series 5 ===
Episode no.	Episode	Airdate	Total viewers	Sky1 Weekly Ranking
1	Warm up	27 July 2014	—N/a	—N/a
2	Audition Day 1	9 August 2014	630,000	3
3	Audition Day 2	10 August 2014	571,000	4
4	Audition Day 3	16 August 2014	527,000	4
5	Audition Day 4	17 August 2014	591,000	3
6	Audition Day 5	23 August 2014	554,000	4
7	Audition Day 6	24 August 2014	700,000	2
8	Heat 1	25 August 2014	552,000	4
9	Heat 2	26 August 2014	488,000	6
10	Heat 3	27 August 2014	457,000	7
11	Live Final	29 August 2014	515,000	5
12	Results	29 August 2014	558,000	2
Special	A Celebration	28 December 2014		

== International versions ==
Colour key

In production (0) Discontinued (7) Not aired (1)

Current and upcoming versions include:

Country	Local title	Presenter(s)	Judges	Channel	Seasons/Series
Australia	Got to Dance	Andrew Günsberg	—N/a	Fox8	Cancelled in 2012
Finland	Pakko Tanssia	Satu Tuomisto; Jani Toivola	Sami Saikkonen; Saana Akiola; Dennis Nylund	Yle TV2	Season 1: 2 March – 4 May 2013
France; Monaco	Got to Dance: Le Meilleur Danseur	Sandrine Corman	David Carreira; Mia Frye; Stephane Jarny	TMC	Season 1: 24 June – 12 August 2015
Germany	Got to Dance	Johanna Klum (1–2); Alexandra Simone Maurer (3)	Palina Rojinski (1–3); Nikeata Thompson (1–2); Howard Donald (1–2); Marvin A. Smith (3); Anton Zetterholm (3)	ProSieben (1–3); Sat.1 (1–2)	Season 1: 20 June – 5 July 2013; Season 2: 17 July – 14 August 2014; Season 3: 13 August – 24 September 2015
Poland	Got to Dance – Tylko Taniec	Maciej Dowbor; Katarzyna Kępka (1–2); Anna Głogowska (3–4)	Joanna Liszowska; Michał Malitowski; Alan Andersz; Krystyna Mazurówna (1–2); Anna Jujka (3–4); Filip Czeszyk (1–2, Guest); Kimberly Wyatt (3–4, Guest)	Polsat	Season 1: 3 March – 11 May 2012; Season 2: 7 September – 9 November 2012; Season 3: 1 March – 3 May 2013; Season 4: 13 September – 22 November 2013
Romania	România dansează	Jorge; Andreea Bălan	CRBL; Monica Petrică; Mihai Bendeac (1); Connect-R (2)	Antena 1	Season 1: March – May 2013; Season 2: March – May 2014
United States	Live to Dance	Andrew Günsberg	Paula Abdul; Travis Payne; Kimberly Wyatt	CBS	Season 1: 4 January – 9 February 2011
Vietnam	Got to Dance Vietnam: Vũ điệu đam mê	Khánh Thi	Trần Ly Ly; Dumbo; Alfredo Torres; Minh Hằng	VTV3	Season 1: 14 September – 28 December 2013

=== American version ===
CBS announced on 10 April 2010 that there was going to be an American version of the series titled Live to Dance and was set to rival So You Think You Can Dance. The show premiered on the said channel on 4 January 2011 and was cancelled a month later in the same year. Kimberly Wyatt also served as a judge on Live to Dance.

=== Polish version ===
A Polish version premiered 2 March 2012 on Polsat, titled Got to Dance - Tylko Taniec. Second edition aired from 7 September to 9 November 2012. A third edition began on 1 March 2013 and a fourth in September 2013. Since March 2011, Polsat have also produced a local version of Must Be the Music (which was first aired on Sky1 in 2010) and has aired its sixth edition. Both shows air two seasons a year in Poland.

=== Australian version ===
Plans for an Australian version of the show were announced in April 2012. It was expected to premiere on the Australian cable channel Fox8 later in 2012, with Andrew Günsberg as the host. However, it was announced in June 2012 that the show was cancelled due to a scheduling conflict with another dance show Everybody Dance Now on Network Ten.

=== German version ===
The German version premiered on 20 June 2013 on ProSieben, with the remaining shows being broadcast on Sat.1. Johanna Klum hosts the show while Palina Rojinski, Nikeata Thompson and Howard Donald are the judges. A second season was aired in 2014 and a third in 2015.

== See also ==
- So You Think You Can Dance
- Must Be the Music
- Strictly Come Dancing
- Dancing on Ice
- Britain's Got Talent
