= Ralph Stock =

German game designer

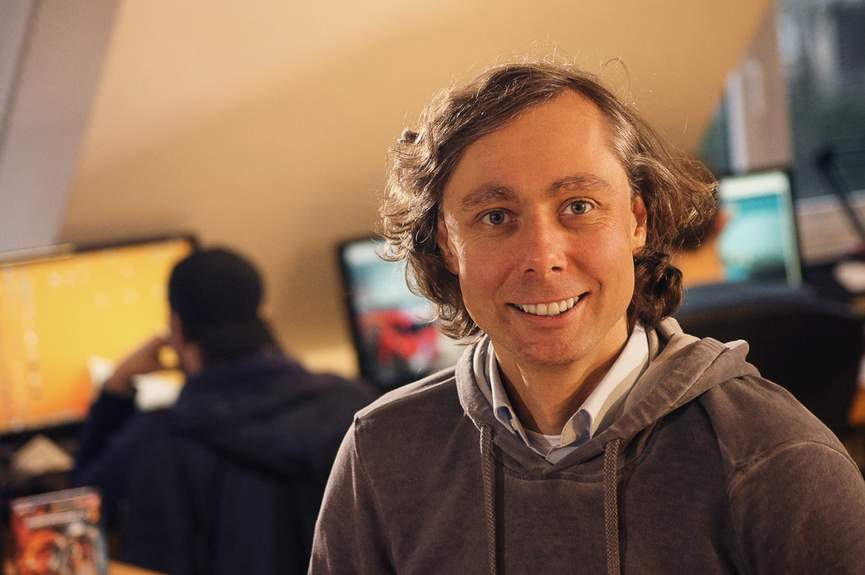
- Stock in 2014
- Born: 1969 (age 56–57); Gießen, West Germany
- Occupations: Video game designer, entrepreneur
- Known for: Mad TV (video game), Emergency (video game series)

Ralph Stock (born 1969) is a German game designer. He is best known for his video games Mad TV and Emergency.

== Life and career ==
=== Early years (1977–1992) ===
Around 1977, Ralph Stock stumbled upon a Commodore PET at the home of a family friend and had his first chance to dabble in computer science. Hamurabi, a resource management game, spurred his fascination with video games and their development. In the early 1980s, at the age of twelve, Stock built his first computer, a Sinclair ZX81, from an assembly kit. He used this computer for his first experiments in programming. At the age of fifteen, Stock developed his first game for the Commodore 64 with a group of friends from school: an adventure game called Philosopher's Stone. Stock was still at school when the game was published and commercially marketed by Kingsoft in 1984. While still finishing school, Stock worked on Bozuma: Mystery of the Mummy and East vs. West: Berlin 1948, finally graduating in 1988. Bozuma was published by Time Warp Software GmbH, a Rainbow Arts (Softgold) label. Stock continued to work with Softgold/Rushware, first as a freelancer, later in a permanent role as a programmer and producer at Rainbow Arts. He also developed his own project, Mad TV, at Rainbow Arts; laying the foundations for its indirect successors. After working as a producer and game designer at Rainbow Arts, Ralph Stock became the chief producer and head of development in 1990.

For Stock, like many other game developers in the post-Amiga era, Rainbow Arts was a place to test his ideas before founding his own company. By his own statement, developing the German-language versions of computer games by Lucasfilm Games, TSR, and SSI, and interacting with game designers from around the world, like Chris Roberts and Richard Garriott, was pivotal in Stock's career as a game designer and producer.

=== Promotion Software and Sixteen Tons Entertainment (1993–present) ===
In 1993, Ralph Stock founded the company Promotion Software GmbH in Tübingen, Germany. With his company he developed promotional games such as Victor Loomes, Tom Long: The Time Adventure (MS DOS) and Jeff Jet: Adventure Infohighway. In 1994, he released his first political edutainment game: Der rasende Reporter (simulation, MS DOS). In cooperation with Ikarion, Stock developed other titles like Mad News (1994) and Caribbean Disaster (1995) in the style of the humoristic simulation game, Mad TV. Musician Chris Huelsbeck composed the soundtracks for these and other games by Ralph Stock.

Stock also worked with board game authors like Reiner Knizia, creating digital versions of board games like Keltis (2009), Einfach Genial (2009), and Heckmeck (2014).

In 1997, inspired by Command & Conquer, Stock invented a rescue-simulation game, Emergency: Fighters for Life - a real-time strategy game “turned into something positive”, which was released in 1998. According to Gamesindustry.biz, the Emergency series remains ″one of the most important German game titles to this day″. Under the label Sixteen Tons Entertainment, Ralph Stock developed several other games in Tübingen like Gotcha! Extreme Paintball (2004), The Show (2007), and sequels in the Emergency game series. In 2009, he founded a subsidiary studio in the Media City Babelsberg. Games developed there were published under the name Quadriga Games up until 2012. Since 2017 the studio is based in Berlin.

=== Social commitment ===
Stock works on gamification, games for health and games for digital education through the division of Promotion Software GmbH specialized in applied games (Serious Games Solutions) and shares his experience at trade fairs. In addition to his work as a game developer, he attended the International German Forum on Health and Innovation (Internationales Deutschlandforum) at the request of Angela Merkel, which was held at the German Chancellery. Stock also speaks at events like the Learntec conference, the Didacta trade fair for the education sector, the Bizplay trade conference, the Serious Games Conference, and German Dev Days. Ralph Stock is also invited to judge competitions. In 2019 he was a judge at the Animated Games Award, a contest held by the Stuttgart International Festival of Animated Films.

== Recognition ==
Stock is regarded as one of the leading developers of digital games for the health and education sectors. His most famous game, Mad TV, is a whacky television station simulation game published by Rainbow Arts in 1991. The game received positive reviews from the trade press (Powerplay magazine called it "one of the funniest strategy games of the year") and inspired various official and unofficial sequels.

Stock's Emergency HQ, released in 2018 for iOS and Android, is the first game in the Emergency series to be designed as a purely free-to-play game. PocketPC magazine described it as a successful implementation of the Emergency game principle, calling it "a strong classic re-issued for the mobile gaming market".

His game Emergency 2016 was presented as an application example at the 10th European Conference on Game Based Learning by the University of the West of Scotland.

== Games ==
Name	Year	Credited with	Publisher
Philosopher's Stone (Der Stein der Weisen)	1984	developer	Kingsoft
Bozuma – Mystery of the Mummy	1988	programmer	Rainbow Arts Software GmbH
East vs. West: Berlin 1948	1989	creator	Time Warp Productions
Mad TV	1990	producer	Rainbow Arts Software GmbH
Log!cal	1991	producer and additional design	Rainbow Arts Software GmbH
Victor Loomes	1993	idea and project management	Promotion Software GmbH
Tom Long: The Time Adventure	1993	realization	Promotion Software GmbH
Hurra Deutschland (The game about the satirical series Hurra Deutschland)	1994	idea, producer	Rainbow Arts Software GmbH, Softgold Computerspiele GmbH
Mad News	1994	original concept and documentation	Promotion Software GmbH
Der rasende Reporter	1994	developer	Bundespresseamt
Berlin Connection	1994	ceo	Promotion Software GmbH
Tim und Nina	1995	developer	Promotion Software GmbH
Jeff Jet: Abenteuer Infohighway	1995	developer	Promotion Software GmbH
Caribbean Disaster	1995	idea, concept and manual	Promotion Software GmbH
Emergency	1998	idea, producer and voices	WizardWorks Group, Inc.
Emergency Police	2001	ceo	Deep Silver
Emergency 2	2002	idea, producer	Deep Silver
Gotcha! Extreme Paintball	2004	idea, executive producer and ceo	Gathering of Developers
Emergency 3	2005	concept and executive producer	Take-Two Interactive Software, Inc.
Emergency 4 (911 First Responders)	2006	idea and executive producer	Take-Two Interactive Software, Inc.
The Show	2007	original concept and executive producer	Take-Two Interactive Software, Inc.
Emergency DS	2009	ceo	Destineer
Keltis (digital version of the board game by Dr. Reiner Knizia)	2009	ceo	United Soft Media Verlag GmbH
Einfach genial (digital version of the board game by Dr. Reiner Knizia)	2009	project lead	United Soft Media Verlag GmbH
Emergency 2012	2010	idea and executive producer	Deep Silver
Emergency 2012 DS	2010	idea and executive producer	Rondomedia
Emergency Kids	2011	ceo	United Soft Media Verlag GmbH
Polizei for Windows	2011	idea and executive producer	Rondomedia
Emergency HD	2012	ceo	Promotion Software GmbH
Emergency 2013	2013	idea and executive producer	Deep Silver
Power Matrix	2013	ceo	Siemens Energy
Menschen auf der Flucht	2013	idea and executive producer	missio
Emergency 2014	2014	idea and executive producer	Deep Silver
Emergency 5	2014	idea, executive producer and head of game design	Deep Silver
Heckmeck (digital version of the board game by Dr. Reiner Knizia)	2015	ceo	United Soft Media Verlag GmbH
Emergency 2016	2015	idea and executive producer	Deep Silver
Emergency 2017	2016	idea and executive producer	Deep Silver
Emergency 20	2017	idea and executive producer	Deep Silver
Emergency HQ	2018	ceo	Sixteen Tons Entertainment

== Awards ==
- 2018: Comenius-EduMedia-Award for Blue Brain Club
- 2017: Deutschland – Land der Ideen, category awarded place (German: "ausgezeichneter Ort") for Teamwork
- 2014: Deutscher Preis für Onlinekommunikation 2014, category Best Corporate Game for Power Matrix
- 2013: Digital Communication Awards 2013, category Best Corporate Game for Power Matrix
- 2013: Deutscher Computerspielpreis (German Computer Games Award) jury award, category Bestes Serious Game, for Menschen auf der Flucht
- 2010: Serious Games Award of the jury for Willi wills wissen: Bei den Wikingern at the Serious Games Conference
- 2009: Kindersoftwarepreis TOMMI for Willi wills wissen: Bei den Wikingern
