= Emergency 3: Mission Life =

2006 video game

Emergency 3: Mission:Life
- Cover art
- Developer: Sixteen Tons Entertainment
- Publishers: EU: Take-Two Interactive; NA: Strategy First
- Series: Emergency
- Platform: Microsoft Windows
- Release: EU: January 21, 2005; NA: April 4, 2006
- Genres: Real-time strategy, simulation
- Mode: Single-player

Emergency 3: Mission:Life is the third game in the rescue simulation Emergency series, developed by Sixteen Tons Entertainment and released between 2005 and 2006. It is the direct continuation of Emergency 2: The Ultimate Fight for Life. The game's sequel, Emergency 4: Global Fighters for Life, known in North America as 911: First Responders, was released in Europe on April 16, 2006, only a few days after the North American release of Emergency 3.

== Gameplay ==
Gasoline fire in Emergency 3

The first 3D entry in the franchise, Emergency 3 played similar to its predecessors, in which the player is tasked with directing emergency services in 20 fictional incidents from traffic accidents to terrorist attacks, as well as everyday emergencies in endless modes. The rescue forces were joined by new Technical Assistants tasked with handling miscellaneous issues.

The game also includes an editor to create custom scenarios, units and scripts.

== Reception ==
Reception for Emergency 3: Mission:Life was mixed, issues stated were "Clumsy, frustrating interface" and "Spotty artificial intelligence".

- PC Games June 5 – 76%
- GameSpot June 2–5.3
- PC Games (Germany) – Jan 26, 2005
- GameStar (Germany) – Jan, 2005
- GameSpot – Jun 02, 2006
