= Sharon Savoy =

American dancer, choreographer and author

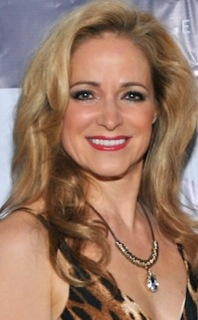
- Sharon Savoy in Laguna Beach, Ca in November 2013
- Born: Chicago, Illinois, United States
- Occupation(s): Dancer, Judge, Author, Choreographer, Coach
- Years active: 1978-present
- Career
- Dances: ballet, ballroom, cabaret, west coast swing, salsa, jazz

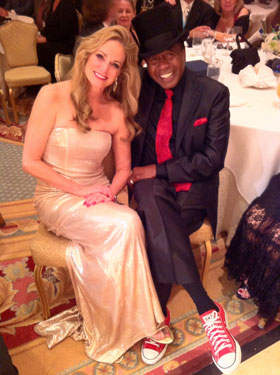
Sharon Savoy and Ben Vereen chat at the Dancer's Hall of Fame event in 2011

Sharon Savoy is an American dancer, choreographer and author. Born and raised in Chicago, Illinois, she began studying dance at the North Carolina School of the Arts at age 15, and later moved to New York City to attend the School of American Ballet until the age of 19. Savoy danced in several ballet companies and later became a Star Search Dance Champion, Blackpool Champion, World Champion and U.S. Open Champion for her mastery in ballroom dance. She continues choreography and dance work in various T.V. shows, competitions and movies. She won the 2013 "World's Best Female Dancer" at the Huading Awards, held in Macau, China.

== Early life ==
Savoy began her dancing career at the age of 15 when she went to study at the North Carolina School of the Arts after a visiting ballet coach, Milenko Banovicth suggested to her mother she had a great talent. She moved to New York City to train School of American Ballet in New York City. with George Balanchine from the ages and nineteen. She then danced in several professional ballet companies under the direction of Edward Villella, the Egelvsky Ballet, the New Jersey Ballet and the New World Ballet until finding a niche in the realm of exhibition ballroom dance.

== Career ==
Savoy is a three time World and four time Blackpool Exhibition Champion, as well as a seven time US Open and three time Star Search Dance Champion. She has been the featured Dancer in Hollywood movies such as, “Dracula: Dead and Loving It” and “Head of State.” Savoy has performed on PBS, Regis and Kathie Lee, Entertainment Tonight, the Miss America pageant, the 2000 Sydney Olympics and at the Kennedy Center for the performing arts.

She is a published author of a book, "'Ballroom! Obsession & Passion' [which] provides an insider's perspective of the world of ballroom dancing.

Savoy worked as a host and radio commentator of Yoursource T.V. while living in Washington DC, a judge for ballroom’s Blackpool event, a coach for Showdance National Champions and finalists in Paula Abdul’s show, “Live to Dance", behind the scenes coach for the professional dancers of "Dancing with the Stars", instructing them on lifts and specialty tricks she pioneered. She has since "ended her competitive ballroom exhibition career...with Savoy's finale having come in the form her trump at the 2004 World Exhibition Dance Championships." More recently, Sharon can be heard commenting on popular dance television series such as the BBC hit "Strictly Come Dancing".

== Awards ==
Savoy was winner of "World's Best Female Dancer" at the Huading Awards, held in Macau, China, 2013. Other titles held by Sharon Savoy include:

- World Cabaret Championship in Madison Square Gardens (1984)
- Two Blackpool Exhibition Champion titles (1984, 1985) with partner Rufus Dustin
- Three-time Star Search winner with partner Arte Phillips
- Two-time World Champion in (1990, 2004)
- Two-time Blackpool Exhibition winner (1990, 1992)
- Seven-time U.S. Open Cabaret Champion with partner David Savoy
