= Willi Weitzel =

German television presenter, author and journalist

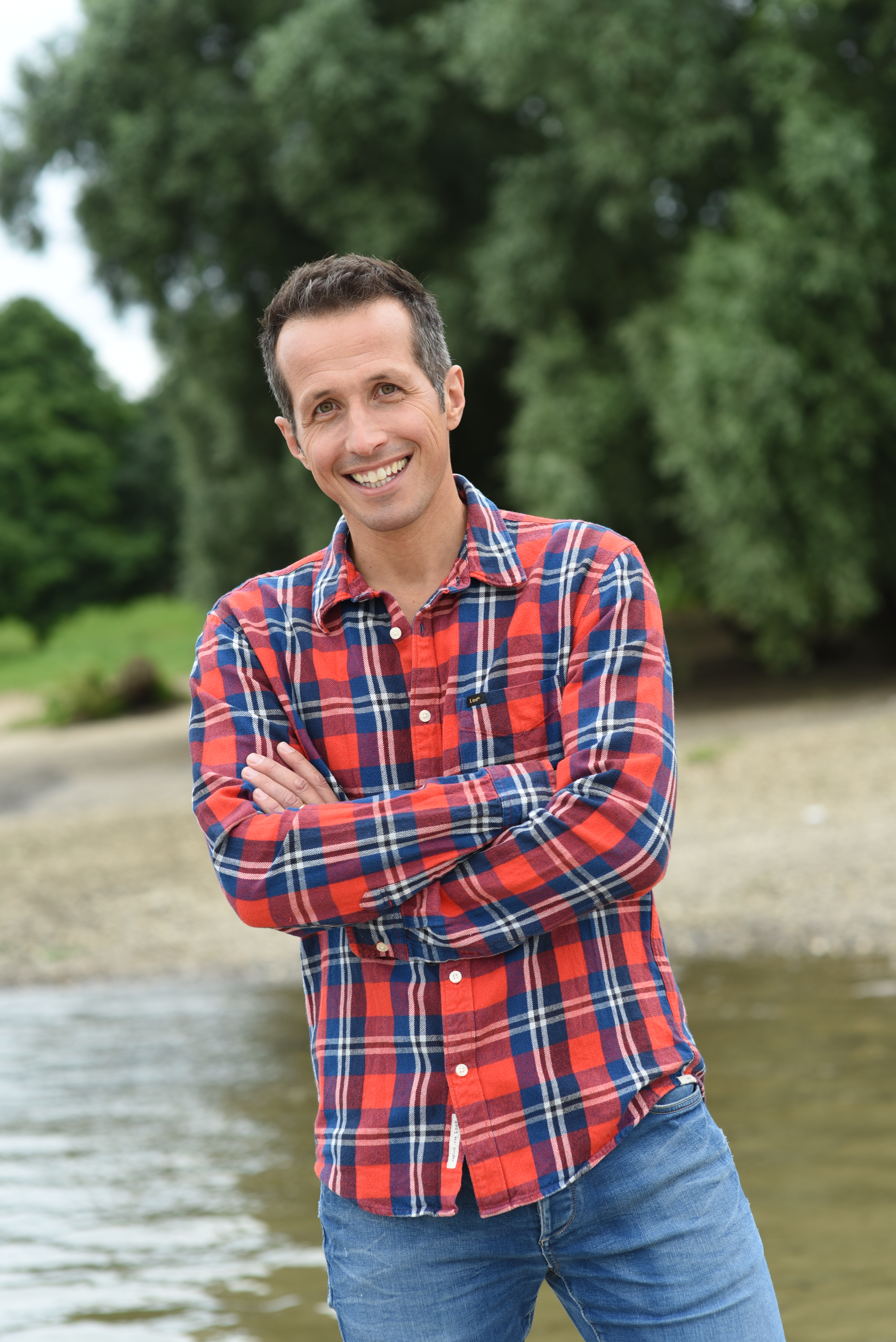
- Weitzel in 2020
- Born: Helmar Rudolf Willi Weitzel; 13 December 1972 (age 53); Marburg, Germany
- Occupations: Television presenter, journalist, film producer
- Years active: 2001–present
- Known for: Willi wills wissen

Helmar Rudolf Willi Weitzel (born 13 December 1972 in Marburg, Germany) is a German television presenter, journalist and film producer. He moderated the television programs Willi wills wissen and Willis VIPs. In 2008 he made the movie Willi und die Wunder dieser Welt. Other TV shows he hosted were Willis Quiz Quark Club, Willi wills wissen – Gute Frage, nächste Frage!, Willi wills wissen von A–Z and Ein guter Grund zu feiern (2011 to 2013). Since 2013 he has been on the road in Germany with his live program Willis wilde Wege. Since January 2018 he has moderated the magazine Gut zu Wissen on BR Fernsehen.

== Biography ==
Willi Weitzel was born in Stadtallendorf (Hesse, Germany), where his family ran a retail business for several generations. In 1992 he took his Abitur at the Stiftsschule St. Johann in Amöneburg and then did civilian service. He then studied theology for four semesters. He then completed an internship at Bayerischer Rundfunk.

At the same time he began a teaching degree for the Hauptschule in the subjects of Catholic religious studies, German, geography and sports, which he completed in 2000.

Weitzel has lived in Herrsching am Ammersee since 2013. He has been married since 2012 and has three daughters.

== Television ==
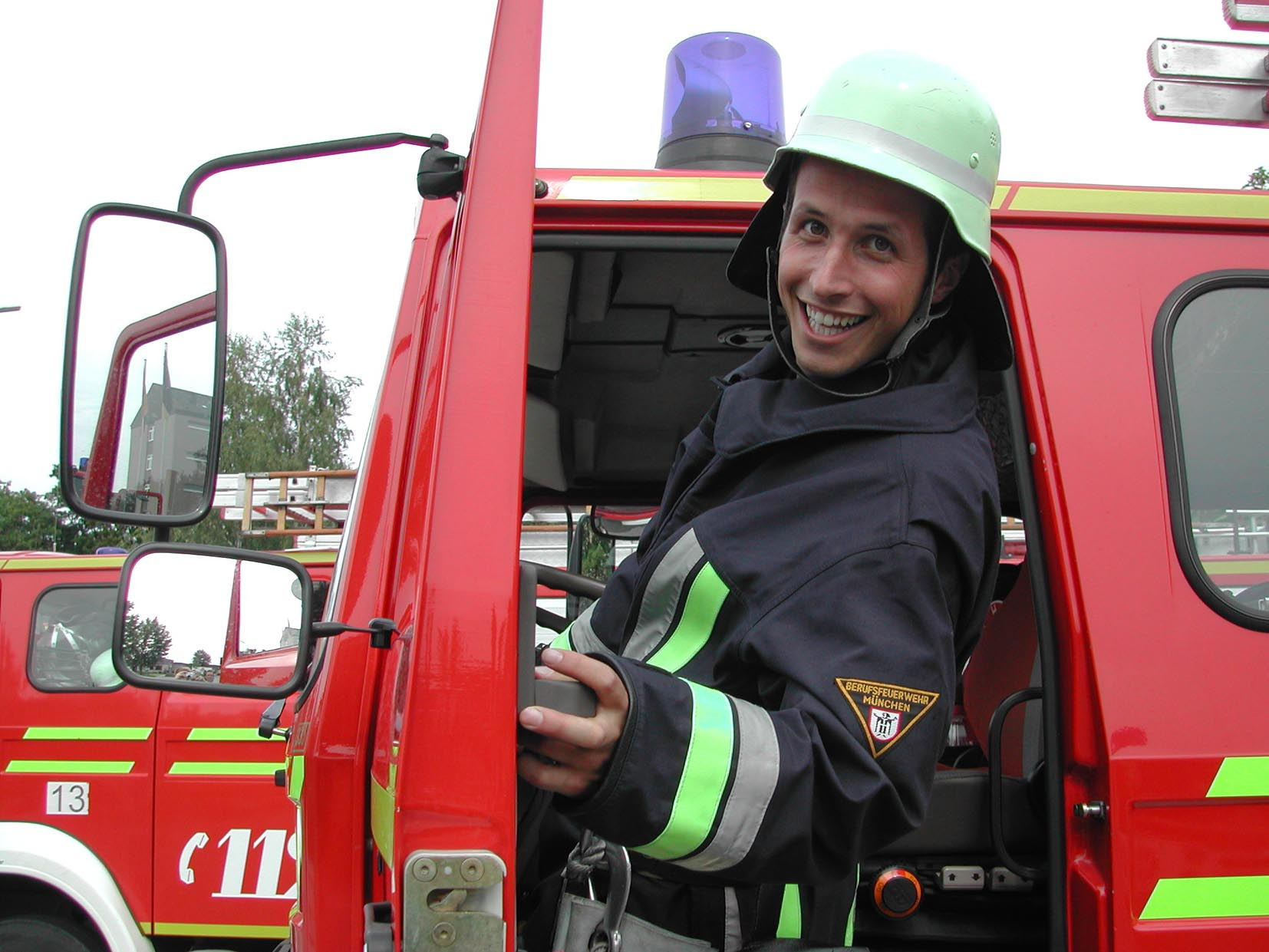
Willi Weitzel at Willi wills wissen

During his time as a reporter for the Children's radio he was discovered in 2001 as a reporter for the newly designed children's TV report format Willi wills wissen. 180 episodes have been produced since it started broadcasting in 2002. Since then, the formats Willis VIPs (since 2005 with 19 episodes), Willis Quiz Quark Club (since 2005 with 80 episodes), Gute Frage, nächste Frage (since 2007 with 50 episodes), Willi wills wissen A–Z Die bunte Buchstabenrevue (since 2010 with 52 episodes), Ein guter Grund zu feiern (since 2011 with 9 episodes) and since 2018 Gut zu wissen (weekly broadcast) was added. Many series are produced by megaherz Film und Fernsehen on behalf of Bayerischer Rundfunk, broadcasting stations are Das Erste, KiKA, Bayerisches Fernsehen, WDR Fernsehen, hr-fernsehen, MDR Fernsehen, Arte and 3sat.

In December 2010, the ZDF announced the commitment of Weitzel as a moderator of a broadcaster about the Catholic holidays. The series Ein guter Grund zu feiern (since 2011 with 9 episodes) was produced as an order production of Weitzels company Welterforscher Film und so weiter for ZDF. The first issue of the series Ein guter Grund zu feiern was broadcast on Epiphany 2011 with Sven Hannawald, further episodes at Feast of Corpus Christi with minh-Khai Phan-Thi, to Assumption of Mary with Bettina Wulff and All Saints Day with Johanna Klum. In 2012, episodes were shown on Epiphany with Karlheinz Brandenburg, to Feast of Corpus Christi with Klaus Allofs, to Assumption of Mary with Jörg Pilawa and at All Saints Day with Thomas Huber. In 2013, the last episode of the series with Weitzel was sent to Epiphany. At Feast of Corpus Christi, the program was taken over by Jordana Schmidt, from All Saints she was moderated by Andreas Korn. To Feast of Corpus Christi 2018 took over Nikodemus Schnabel.

== Films ==
In 2008 Weitzel shot the film Willi und die Wunder dieser Welt in Australia, Algeria, Tokyo, the Canadian Arctic and in Germany. The adventure film was released on 5 March 2009, and was the most successful German documentary film of 2009 with around 450,000 admissions.

In 2011 Weitzel founded the company Welterforscher Film und so weiter, with which he produces his films and manages his own projects. He has been traveling around the globe for the carol singers since 2013, producing films for the annual promotions. Since then he has been in Tanzania (2013), Malawi (2014), Philippines (2015), Bolivia (2016), Kenya (2017) India (2018), Peru (2019), Lebanon (2020) and Ukraine (2021).

Filmmaker Max Kronawitter accompanied Weitzel with his camera on his humanitarian aid campaign with a truck full of donations to the Syrian border from the first planning, through collecting donations to the people in need. The result was the film Willis Grenzerfahrung – Mit einem LKW voll Hoffnung an die syrische Grenze.

As a guest reporter for the television program Checker Tobi, Weitzel reported for the special episode Checker EXTRA – Warum so viele Menschen fliehen in 2015 from Lebanon.

For the series Willi macht Schule he has been moderating films for schools on various curriculum topics since 2019. The format is produced by megaherzcampus.

== Awards ==
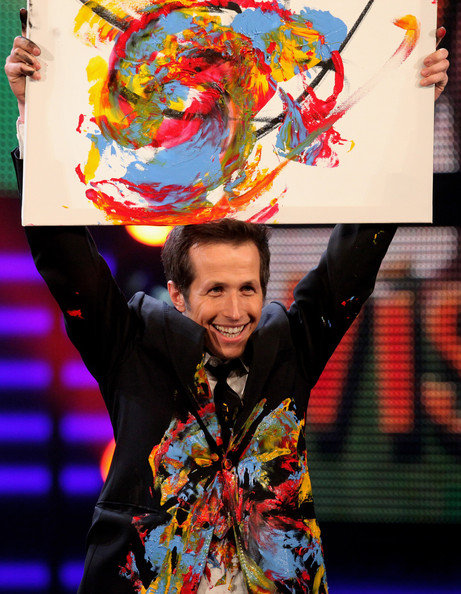
Weitzel at Grimme-Preis (2010)

- 2003: Emil of the television magazine TV Spielfilm for Willi wills wissen
- 2003: Bayerischer Fernsehpreis
- 2003: Erich-Kästner-Fernsehpreis for the episode "Wie ist das mit dem Tod?"
- 2004: Robert-Geisendörfer-Preis of the Evangelical Church
- 2004: Comenius-Medaille of the Evangelische Medienzentrale Bayern
- 2004: Journalistenpreis from the Diakonie Baden und Württemberg
- 2006: Das Silberne Pferd, Media award from the deutscher Reiter- und Fahrerverband (DRFV)
- 2007: HEUREKA Journalistenpreis for Willi wills wissen – Was geht im Rollstuhl
- 2008: Emil of the television magazine TV Spielfilm for Willis VIPs
- 2010: Adolf-Grimme-Preis
- 2011: OttoCar for Willi Weitzel hats geschnallt
- 2013: Silbermedaille of the Gastronomische Akademie Deutschlands for "Willi kocht"
- 2015: AIB Award London (Association for International Broadcasting)
- 2016: Emil for Checker-EXTRA – Warum so viele Menschen fliehen

== Works (selection) ==
- Willi und die Wunder dieser Welt (in German), Alive-Vertrieb und Marketing, 2009
- Willi Weitzel, Florian Sailer (2010), Gute Frage, nächste Frage: Willi gibt schlaue Antworten auf clevere Fragen (in German), Berlin: Ullstein Verlag, ISBN 978-3-548-37351-5
- Willi Weitzel (2010), Peter und der Wolf (in German), München
- Willi Weitzel (2012), Willi kocht. Kinderleichte Rezepte für Groß und Klein. (in German), München: Südwest Verlag, ISBN 978-3-517-08785-6
- Nils Holgersson (in German), Hamburg: SAGA Egmont, 2015
- Willi Weitzel, Wiener Symphoniker (2016), Saint-Saëns: Karneval der Tiere (in German), Wiener Symphoniker (Edel)
- Willi Weitzel (2018), Der Islam: Neugierige Fragen für alle, die's wissen wollen (in German), Frankfurt am Main: edition chrismon, ISBN 978-3-96038-124-2
- Willi Weitzel, Eckart von Hirschhausen (2019), Kommt noch ein Kind zum Arzt (in German), München: Der Hörverlag, ISBN 978-3-8445-3447-4
