= Mystery of the Mummy =

Mystery of the Mummy may refer to:

- Mystery of the Mummy (1988 video game), a 1988 video game from Rainbow Arts
- Sherlock Holmes: The Mystery of the Mummy, also known as The Mystery of the Mummy, a 2002 video game from Frogwares
- The Mystery of the Whispering Mummy, a 1965 novel by Robert Arthur Jr.
