= Got to Dance – Tylko Taniec =

- Genre: Reality talent show
- Presented by: Maciej Dowbor; Anna Głogowska (3-4); Katarzyna Kępka (1-2)
- Judges: Joanna Liszowska; Michał Malitowski; Alan Andersz; Anna Jujka (3-); Krystyna Mazurówna (1-2); Filip Czeszyk (1-2); Kimberly Wyatt (4)
- Opening theme: Bob Sinclar - Rock With Me (instrumental)
- Country of origin: Poland
- Original language: Polish
- No. of series: 4
- No. of episodes: 39

Production
- Production locations: Auditions: Various cities Live shows: Hala Mera, Warszawa
- Running time: 90 mins
- Production company: Shine International

Original release
- Network: Polsat, Polsat HD
- Release: 2 March 2012 – 22 November 2013

Related
- Got to Dance (UK version)

Got to Dance - Po Prostu Taniec is a Polish reality talent show dance competition that has been broadcasting on Polsat in Poland, since 3 March 2012. Auditions for the show take place in various cities around Poland and are open to all dance acts of any age, style or size.

The show airs on Polsat, also in HD, and is hosted by Maciej Dowbor and Katarzyna Kępka. The prize money is currently 100,000 PLN for the winning act.

== Format ==
There are four stages to the competition:

- Stage 1: Producers' auditions (these auditions decide who will perform in front of the judges, but they are not broadcast or acknowledged on the show)
- Stage 2: Judges' auditions
- Stage 3: Live Semi-finals (each act performs in one semi-final, with only 2 advancing to the final)
- Stage 4: Live Final

=== Voting ===
Viewers can vote via phone on liveshows, during auditions viewers can award money to their favorite dancers via the official Facebook application - dancers receive 100 PLN for every single per cent.

== Series overview ==
Series	Year(s)	Time	Hosts	Judges
1	2012	March–May	Maciej Dowbor; Katarzyna Kępka	Joanna Liszowska; Michał Malitowski; Krystyna Mazurówna; Alan Andersz; Filip Czeszyk (Guest Judge)
2	2012	September–October	Maciej Dowbor; Katarzyna Kępka	Joanna Liszowska; Michał Malitowski; Krystyna Mazurówna; Alan Andersz; Filip Czeszyk (Guest Judge)
3	2013	March–May	Maciej Dowbor; Anna Głogowska	Joanna Liszowska; Michał Malitowski; Anna Jujka; Alan Andersz; Kimberly Wyatt (Guest Judge)
4	2013	September–October	Maciej Dowbor; Anna Głogowska	Joanna Liszowska; Michał Malitowski; Anna Jujka; Alan Andersz; Kimberly Wyatt (Guest Judge)

=== Season 1 (2012) ===
==== Finalist ====
Place	Contestant
1.	Dawid Ignaczak
2.	Top Toys
3.	Lollipops
4.	Caro Dance
5.	Takt Chadek Chełm
6.	Ziemia Myślenicka
7.	Catch The Flava

=== Season 2 (2012) ===
==== Finalist ====
Place	Contestant
1.	Krzysztof Kozak
2.	Jekaterina Romankova; Justas Kucinskas
3.	Temptation
4.	Sztewite Gang
5.	Atom Kids
6.	DNA Crew
7.	26-600 Studio
8.	Beta

=== Season 3 (2013) ===
==== Finalist ====
Place	Contestant
1.	DzikiStyl Company
2.	UDS
3.	Maciek "Sheva" Mołdoch
4.	Bailamos
5.	Paulina Turska
6.	Kamil Szpejenkowski
7.	From The Soul
8.	Mati And Sara

=== Season 4 (2013) ===
==== Finalist ====
Place	Contestant
1.	Michał "Kaczorex" Kaczorowski
2.	Katarzyna i Jakub Pursa
3.	UDS Kids
4.	Bartosz Dopytalski
5.	Aleksander "Nevi" Białobrzewski
6.	Rachu Ciachu
7.	Ślunski Azyl
8.	Damian "D-Tron" Murach

== Transmissions ==
=== Original series ===
Series	Start date	End date	Episodes
1	3 March 2012	11 May 2012	10
2	7 September 2012	9 November 2012	10
3	1 March 2013	3 May 2013	9
4	13 September 2013	22 November 2013	10
