= Turbo (street dancer) =

Turbo Dredd
- Origin: London, England
- Genres: New school popping
- Website: TurboDredd.com

Turbo (born Isaac Emmanuel Baptiste) is a British street dancer, musician and entertainer. He is best known for his appearance as a finalist on Sky TV's Got to Dance and CBBC show Turbo Boost.

His credits include appearances in music videos for Madonna, Jamelia, Will Smith, Mis-teeq, Shaznay Lewis and he has also been a backing dancer for Whitney Houston.
