= Spherical (video game) =

1989 video game

- game cover art
- Developer: Electronic Zoo
- Publisher: Rainbow Arts
- Designer: Jörn Galka
- Composers: Chris Hülsbeck, Ramiro Vaca
- Platforms: Amiga, Amstrad CPC, Atari ST, Commodore 64, ZX Spectrum
- Release: 1989
- Genre: Platform Game
- Modes: Single-player, Multiplayer

Spherical is a 1989 video game published by Rainbow Arts. It was released for the Amiga, Amstrad CPC, Atari ST, Commodore 64 and ZX Spectrum. It is similar in terms of gameplay to Tecmo's Solomon's Key.

== Gameplay ==
Spherical is a platform game in which the players have to move a glowing Starball around the obstacles filling room to get it through the exit. To do so they are able to create and destroy blocks in order to change the path of the sphere and eventually defend themselves from enemies.

== Reception ==
Reception

Award
| Publication | Award |
|---|---|
| Crash | Crash Smash |

Allen L. Greenberg reviewed the game for Computer Gaming World, and stated that "For an arcade game, Spherical contains an unusual degree of strategy. This alone sets the game apart from others. For an interesting challenge of both thought and reflexes, get Spherical!"

Tom Malcom for .info rated the game 5 stars and said "First rate in every way, the game even has a cooperative two-player mode with a different set of screens. Don't miss it."
