= Got To Dance – Tylko Taniec season 1 =

Got To Dance – Tylko Taniec
- Season 1
- Hosted by: Maciej Dowbor; Katarzyna Kępka
- Judges: Joanna Liszowska; Michał Malitowski; Krystyna Mazurówna; Alan Anders
- Winner: Dawid Ignaczak
- Runner-up: Top Toys

Release
- Original network: Polsat (also Polsat HD)
- Original release: 3 March – 11 May 2012

Season chronology
- Next → Season 2

The first season of Got to Dance - Tylko Taniec began on 3 March 2012 on Polsat. Dancers compete to win PLN 100,000.

The show airs on Polsat, also in HD, and is hosted by Maciej Dowbor, and Katarzyna Kępka The prize money is currently 100,000 PLN and right to perform on Sopot TOPtrendy Festival for the winning act.

== Auditions ==
Every contestant had to perform on precasting. Then after moving on dancers were allowed to dance in front of show judges, who picked 30 finalists after all auditions.

=== Facebook voting ===
From Friday to Wednesday piątku after casting episodes Facebook fans can vote for their favorite performers. There are 10000 PLN to give away. 1% equals 100 PL. Results:

- Week 1: Caro Dance – 24%
- Week 2: Top Toys – 22%
- Week 3: Biohazard – 26%
- Week 4: Scandal – 24%
- Week 5: Soul Dance - 30%
- Week 6: Rachu Ciachu - 26%

== Semi-finalists ==
Judges picked 30 semi-finalists. 2 moved on to the final from each episode. There was also one wild card awarded by Facebook app users.

=== Soloists ===
Name	Style	Age	Hometown
Robert Krajewski	Breakdance	27	Mysłowice
Dawid Ignaczak	Popping	19	Włocławek
Tomasz Pałasz	Tap	36	Warszawa
Arkadiusz Szubiński	Popping/Locking/Electric Boogaloo	14	Bydgoszcz
Monika Musiał	Pop/Jazz	16	Komorniki
Michał Piwowarek	Jazz	21	Warszawa
Mateusz "Fantom" Krzyważnia	Popping	20	Gdańsk
Joanna Sikorska	Lyrical Jazz/Aerial Dance	28	

=== Duets ===
Names	Style	Hometown
Łukasz Matera and Maciej Skwarek	Irish stepdance	Warszawa
Duo Rock	Rock & Roll	Zielona Góra
Katarzyna Błoch & Marek Zaborowski	Wheelchair ballroom	Poznań
Joanna Malik & Michał Woźnica	Boogie Woogie/Swing/Rock & Roll	Tarnowskie Góry
Joanna & Jarosław Derybowski	Pole Dance	Góraszka
Justyna Możdżonek & Mateusz Brzozowski	Ballroom standard	Warszawa
Barbara Zielińska & Marcin Olszewski	Broadway	Warszawa
Jekaterina Romankowa & Justas Kucinskas	Ballroom/Ballet	Lithuania

=== Groups ===
Name	Style	Number of members	Hometown
Takt Chadek Chełm	Ballroom	16	Chełm
Only Boys	Hip-Hop/Krump/Popping	10	Zielona Góra
Rapsodia	Folk Dances	10	Żukowo
Belong 2 Beat	Hip-Hop	6	Warszawa
Monsterbots	Hip-Hop/Popping/Krump/Jackson Style	3	Tricity
Top Toys	Hip-Hop/Popping	7	Koszalin
Reprezentacyjny Zespół Pieśni i Tańca "Ziemia Myślenicka"	Polish National Dances	16	Myślenice
Caro Dance	Contemporary/Jazz	21	Siedlce
Damn Girls	High Heels	5	Warszawa
Lollipops	Hip-Hop/Krump	17	Białystok
Kadryl	Ballroom latin	12	Białystok
Fair Play Kwadrat	Hip-Hop	8	Białystok
Catch The Flava	Breakdance	6	Various Cities around Poland
Samba Afro Carnaval	Samba	6	Czech Republic/Poland/Mexico/Columbia

== Semi-finals ==
=== Semi-finale 1 (20 April 2012) ===
Order	Contestant(s)	Stars^{1}			Result
Order	Contestant(s)	Joanna	Michał	Krystyna	Result
1	Takt Chadek Chełm	★	★	★	Advanced
2	Robert Krajewski	★	★	★	Eliminated
3	Only Boys	★	★	★	Eliminated
4	Łukasz Matera & Maciej Skwarek	★	★	★	Eliminated
5	Rapsodia	★	★	★	Eliminated
6	Belong 2 Beat	★	★	★	Eliminated
7	Dawid Ignaczak	★	★	★	Advanced
8	Duo Rock	★	★	★	Eliminated
9	Monsterbots	★	★	★	Eliminated
10	Katarzyna Błoch & Marek Zaborowski	★	★	★	Eliminated

^1 This episode Alan Andersz was unable to sit at the panel, due to his recent injury.

Results:

- 1st Place: Dawid Ignaczak
- 2nd Place: Takt Chadek Chełm

=== Semi-finale 2 (27 April 2012) ===
Order	Contestant(s)	Stars				Result
Order	Contestant(s)	Joanna	Michał	Krystyna	Alan	Result
1	Top Toys	★	★	★	★	Advanced
2	Joanna Malik & Michał Woźnica	★	★	★	★	Eliminated
3	Reprezentacyjny Zespół Pieśni i Tańca "Ziemia Myślenicka"	★	★	★	★	Advanced
4	Tomasz Pałasz	★	★	★	★	Eliminated
5	Joanna & Jarosław Derybowski	★	★	★	★	Eliminated
6	Caro Dance	★	★	★	★	Eliminated
7	Arkadiusz Szubiński	★	★	★	★	Eliminated
8	Damn Girls	★	★	★	★	Eliminated
9	Monika Musiał	★	★	★	★	Eliminated
10	Justyna Możdżonek & Mateusz Brzozowski	★	★	★	★	Eliminated

Results:

- 1st Place: Top Toys
- 2nd Place: Reprezentacyjny Zespół Pieśni i Tańca "Ziemia Myślenicka"

=== Semi-finale 3 (4 May 2012) ===
Order^{2}	Contestant(s)	Stars				Result
Order^{2}	Contestant(s)	Joanna	Filip^{1}	Krystyna	Alan	Result
1	Catch The Flava	★	★	★	★	Advanced
2	Joanna Sikorska	★	★	★	★	Eliminated
3	Mateusz "Fantom" Krzyważnia	★	★	★	★	Eliminated
4	Fair Play Kwadrat	★	★	★	★	Eliminated
5	Lollipops	★	★	★	★	Advanced
6	Barbara Zielińska & Marcin Olszewski	★	★	★	★	Eliminated
7	Samba Afro Carnaval	★	★	★	★	Eliminated
8	Michał Piwowarek	★	★	★	★	Eliminated
9	Kadryl	★	★	★	★	Eliminated

Results:

- 1st Place: Lollipops
- 2nd Place: Catch The Flava

^1 Michał Malitowski was replaced at the panel by Filip Czeszyk. Michał didn't appear due to his preparations to Blackpool Open ballroom competition.
^2 Jekaterina Romankowa & Justas Kucinskas didn't perform due to Jekaterina Romankowa's injury. They are planning to come back next season.

== Wildcard Facebook voting ==
Results:

- After Semi-finale 1: Only Boys - 45%
- After Semi-finale 2: Caro Dance - 46%
- After Semi-finale 3: Fair Play Kwadrat - 27%

After 3 semi-finals wild card was awarded to Caro Dance, which returns to the competition, as one of seven finalists.

== Finale (11 May 2012) ==
- Guest Dancer:
  - Theater Roma artists - "Singing in the Rain"
  - Joanna Leunis & Michał Malitowski

=== Round 1 ===
Order	Contestant(s)	Stars				Result
Order	Contestant(s)	Joanna	Michał	Krystyna	Alan	Result
1	Lollipops	★	★	★	★	Eliminated
2	Takt Chadek Chełm	★	★	★	★	Eliminated
3	Top Toys	★	★	★	★	Advanced
4	Catch The Flava	★	★	★	★	Eliminated
5	Reprezentacyjny Zespół Pieśni i Tańca "Ziemia Myślenicka"	★	★	★	★	Eliminated
6	Dawid Ignaczak	★	★	★	★	Advanced
7	Caro Dance	★	★	★	★	Eliminated

Results:

- Top Toys
- Dawid Ignaczak

=== Round 2 ===
Order	Contestant(s)	Stars				Result
Order	Contestant(s)	Joanna	Michał	Krystyna	Alan	Result
1	Dawid Ignaczak	★	★	★	★	Winner
2	Top Toys	★	★	★	★	Runner-up

Results:

- Winner: Dawid Ignaczak
- Runner-up: Top Toys
