= Gaana Rajas =

Dance group

Background information
- Genres: Gaana
- Years active: 2012–present
- Members: Jeya Raveendran; Prito Itiacandy; Tivyan Wigneswaran; Mayuri Vijay; Neethu Haridas; Vidhya Yogarajah; Rakhee Visavadia; Rajni Ghir

Gaana Rajas is a Gaana dance group. They came to the semi-finals of Got to Dance.

== History ==
Gaana Rajas was formed by people aged between 21 and 27, who met while participating in university dance competitions. The group were contestants in the dance reality show Got to Dance in 2012. They performed at the Under the Stars event in Newham in 2013.

== Members ==
Gaana Rajas was made of 10 members when they competed in Got to Dance in 2012.

- Jeya Raveendran
- Prito Itiacandy
- Tivyan Wigneswaran
- Mayuri Vijay
- Neethu Haridas
- Vidhya Yogarajah
- Rakhee Visavadia
- Rajni Ghir
