= Gotcha! Extreme Paintball =

2004 video game

- Developer: Sixteen Tons Entertainment
- Publishers: EU: Gathering; NA: Viva Media
- Producer: Ralph Stock
- Designer: Sebastian Witt
- Programmer: Volker Arweiler
- Engine: Vision
- Platforms: Microsoft Windows, Xbox
- Release: 30 July 2004: Windows; DE: 30 July 2004
- Genres: First-person shooter, sports
- Modes: Single-player, multiplayer

Gotcha! Extreme Paintball, released in Europe as Gotcha!, is a 2004 first-person shooter and paintball video game developed by German studio Sixteen Tons Entertainment. It was released for Microsoft Windows in Germany in July 2004, followed by an Xbox version in 2005. A North American Windows release, published by Viva Media, followed in 2006.

The game features single-player league competition and multiplayer matches in which players use paintball markers and grenades. Its multiplayer modes include team deathmatch, capture the flag, team elimination, last man standing, and kill the king. Gotcha! received mixed-to-negative reviews. Critics generally criticized its artificial intelligence, limited single-player mode, and conventional gameplay, although some praised its fast pace, variety of multiplayer modes, and comparatively light-hearted presentation.

== Gameplay ==
Gameplay in the Windows version

Gotcha! Extreme Paintball is a first-person shooter based on competitive paintball. The player selects a male or female character and equips a team with paintball markers and grenades. Available equipment includes pistols, pump-action and automatic markers, markers equipped with telescopic sights, paint grenades, and smoke grenades.

In the single-player mode, the player manages a team and competes against computer-controlled opponents in a paintball league. Matches take place in arenas representing several international locations and feature changing weather conditions. Characters can crouch, lie prone, and strafe, allowing players to avoid incoming paintballs and use the environment as cover.

The game includes team deathmatch, capture the flag, flag elimination, team elimination, last man standing, and kill the king modes. The Windows version supports multiplayer over a local area network or the Internet. The Xbox version supported online competition through Xbox Live, with matches for up to 12 players. While Xbox Live for original Xbox games was terminated in 2010, Gotcha! Extreme Paintball is now playable online using revival online servers for the Xbox called Insignia.

== Development and release ==
Gotcha! Extreme Paintball was developed by Sixteen Tons Entertainment and produced by Ralph Stock. Sebastian Witt served as the game's designer and Volker Arweiler as its programmer. The game was developed using the Vision game engine.

The Windows version was released in Germany on 30 July 2004. A playable demo was released alongside the game.

== Reception ==
Reception

Review scores
Publication	Score	
Publication	PC	Xbox
4Players	51/100	N/A
Gamekult	3/10	N/A
Jeuxvideo.com	12/20	9/20
Joystick	2/10	N/A
M! Games	N/A	40/100
PC Games (DE)	5.2/10	N/A
JeuxActu	12/20	N/A
Games.Tiscali.cz	6/10	N/A
GamersGlobal	3.5/10	N/A

Gotcha! Extreme Paintball received mixed-to-negative reviews. Critics frequently compared its team-based gameplay with that of Counter-Strike, although they disagreed over whether its paintball setting distinguished it sufficiently from conventional first-person shooters.

Ludovic Bechtold of JeuxActu gave the Windows version 12 out of 20. He praised its fast pace and number of game modes but criticized its artificial intelligence, dated graphics, and character animation. Despite its shortcomings, Bechtold considered the game enjoyable, although it did not reach the standard set by Counter-Strike.

Jean-Marc Wallimann of Jeuxvideo.com also gave the Windows version 12 out of 20. He found that the maps offered suitable locations for players to hide and ambush their opponents, but considered them small and wanted more alternate routes through each arena. Reviewing the Xbox version for the same publication, Nicolas Charciarek gave it 9 out of 20. He criticized control and gameplay problems that he considered absent from the Windows version, as well as the presentation of the environments and characters. He also considered the single-player mode limited by the behaviour of the computer-controlled players.

Other reviewers were more critical. Cyril Dupont of Joystick gave the Windows version 2 out of 10, criticizing its lack of pace and arguing that it failed to provide the dynamism expected from a first-person shooter. Kévin Kuipers of Gamekult gave it 3 out of 10, criticizing its gameplay and artificial intelligence. Kuipers was more positive about its technical presentation, including the modelling of its environments and some of its visual effects.

Thomas Weiss of PC Games rated the Windows version 5.2 out of 10. He considered its gameplay conventional and argued that effects such as more visually distinctive paint impacts could have given it greater appeal. Weiss compared its graphics with those of Counter-Strike, citing its angular environments, blurred textures, and limited particle effects, although he praised its rendering of water.

Sébastien Delahaye of NoFrag criticized the game's artificial intelligence, gameplay, graphics, and sound, concluding that it offered little of interest.

By contrast, Etienne Froment of Xbox Gamer was more positive about the Xbox version. He considered its action fast-paced and described it as an enjoyable alternative to the more simulation-oriented Greg Hastings' Tournament Paintball.

Some critics commented favourably on the game's comparatively light-hearted presentation. Kuipers considered its lack of lethal violence to make it more approachable for younger players. Wallimann similarly noted that its paintball setting distinguished it from the terrorist and counter-terrorist themes commonly used by team-based shooters of the period.
