= Grand Monster Slam =

1989 video game

- Developer: Golden Goblins
- Publisher: Rainbow Arts
- Programmer: Rolf Lakaemper
- Artist: Hartwig Niedergassel
- Composer: Chris Huelsbeck
- Platforms: Amiga, Atari ST, Commodore 64, MS-DOS
- Release: 1989
- Genre: Sports
- Mode: Single-player

Grand Monster Slam is a sports video game for the Amiga, Commodore 64, Atari ST, and MS-DOS. It is somewhat based on the 1985 arcade video game Penguin Wars. In Amiga Power's first All Time Top One Hundred in the inaugural 'Issue 0', it was declared to be the 100th best Amiga game of all time. It never reappeared in the top 100 and its initial inclusion was said to be due to the insistence of a single writer. In March 2017 the source code of the game became available via the Internet Archive.

== Gameplay ==
The game is based on the fictional Grand Monster Slam tournament set on the fantasy world of GhoID. The competitors of Grand Monster Slam are drawn from staple fantasy races including trolls, orcs, ogres and imps. Player control unnamed dwarf. The final boss is a golden goblin named Winner, based on the logo of the developer, Golden Goblins.

== Tournament ==
The game involves two leagues of eight competitors each, and a final league with three "boss" characters with supernatural abilities. In each league players must compete in a knockout tournament, and, if they win the final, successfully complete a game of Faulton Feeding (see below) to advance to the next league.

Upon becoming champion of the third and final league, players are awarded the Gold Medal and the Yellow Jerkin by the King. If players lose a match, they are made the King's fool. If they have made it past the first league, they are given the opportunity to begin the league again, but will lose all their points.

== Rules ==
The standard game of Grand Monster Slam takes place on a small pitch, apparently about the same size as a tennis court. Each of the two players stands on each end. On each side of the court six Beloms (also known as 'Boms') are lined up.

The aim of Grand Monster Slam is to kick all one's Beloms over to the opposite side, then run across the pitch to claim victory. When kicked across Beloms land at the back of the pitch, then move to occupy one of the six spot's on the player's line as soon as one is free. To succeed, players must try to hit their opponent with their Beloms in order to knock the opponent down, thus briefly preventing the opponent from kicking Beloms across the pitch. Gameplay is a mixture of dodging the opponent's Beloms while accurately kicking one's own in order to knock the opponent down.

The Beloms themselves are brown, spherical ball-like creatures with faces, which tremble as the player approaches them.

The pitch is separated from the spectator stands by a low wall. If a Belom is kicked over the wall, the Belom player receives a 'Pelvan' (penalty). A duck-like creature descends from above the pitch on a rope and makes its way to the opposite end of the field. The penalty-taker then kicks the Pelvan-creature, and the other must move to try to save it. If the rescuing player fails to catch the Pelvan, three Beloms move from the opponent's end to the rescuer's (if the opponent's end has fewer than four Beloms left, enough move so that the opponent only has one left). If the rescuer catches it, one Belom moves to the opponent's end. The Pelvan can be kicked left, right, or straight ahead, and the receiver can move in the same directions, so any Pelvan has a one-in-three chance of being saved.

In the first league, the pitch is empty. In the second and third leagues the two opponents are separated by a low wall with a gap in the middle. This has two consequences: the balls must be kicked with more force to get them over the wall, and the players must finish in the middle of the pitch after having gotten rid of all the Beloms in order to run across through the gap.

== Mini-games ==
Grand Monster Slam has two mini-games, which appear in between the main matches. They can also be practised from the main menu.

=== Revenge of the Beloms ===
Revenge of the Beloms takes place after every quarter-final and semi-final. The player is surrounded by eight Beloms at the compass points, which attack one by one. They give warning as to which one will attack next by kicking up dust just before they move in. The player must fend them off with a weapon resembling a barbell that acts like a pugil stick. If a Belom gets past the player's weapon, the player trips and falls, the other Beloms pile in and bounce up and down on the fallen player, and the mini-game ends.

Before each game the King gives the player a target to meet, which gets higher throughout the tournament. Depending on how many Beloms were fended off relative to this target, the player will either lose some of the points awarded in the previous round or gain bonus points.

=== Faulton Feeding ===
After winning the final of the first and second leagues, the player must complete a game of Faulton Feeding. This takes place on the same pitch as the main games, with six Beloms lined up in front of the player as usual, and six Faultons, which resemble frogs, lined up on pillars on the opposite side. The player must kick the Beloms into the Faultons' open mouths, which involves applying the right amount of power so that the Beloms do not fly over or under the Faultons.

The player must successfully feed at least two Faultons in the first round of Faulton Feeding, and must feed at least four in the second round. If successful, the player advances to the next league. Failure means the player must begin the league again.
