= X-Out (video game) =

1989 video game

- Developers: Arc Development; Rainbow Arts
- Platforms: Amiga, Amstrad CPC, Atari ST, Commodore 64, ZX Spectrum,
- Release: 1990: C64, Amiga, ST, Spectrum, CPC
- Genre: Scrolling shooter
- Mode: Single-player

X-Out (pronounced "cross out") (Note: The cassette version of the Commodore 64 version displays "Loading Crossout" at the beginning of the loading process. In both Amiga and C64 versions, the synthesized voice in the introduction says, "Get ready for Crossout.") is a horizontally scrolling shooter with eight levels set underwater. It was released by Rainbow Arts in 1990 for the Commodore 64, Amiga, Atari ST, ZX Spectrum, and Amstrad CPC. A sequel, Z-Out, was released in 1990.

On January 13, 2022, Ziggurat Interactive announced that they had acquired the rights to the game. A remake, titled X-Out: Resurfaced, was announced in August 2024. It is being developed by Kritzelkratz 3000 and published by ININ Games.

== Gameplay ==
Before starting the game and between levels, the player visits a shop and uses their game score to purchase new submarines and equipment. The submarines come in four different variants, and additional purchases act as additional "lives". Each can be equipped with a one-way, two-way or three-way fire weapon of increasing power (and thus cost). Secondary weapons include sonic waves, power-shots and target-seeking missiles. The player can also purchase auxiliary satellites and specify their movement pattern, which can be circular orbits, vertical and horizontal movements, or an intercepting action.

== Reception ==
Your Sinclair gave the ZX Spectrum version a score of 84%, highlighting the comprehensive shop sequence and large, well-animated enemies. Criticisms included the monochrome graphics which were said to be a little confusing, and the lack of a sense of danger.

A retrospective review for the Amiga version from HonestGamers scored the game 4/5, praising some of the game's atypical design choices, but complaining that the final stage outstays its welcome.
