= M.U.D. TV =

2010 video game

- Developer(s): Realmforge Studios
- Publisher(s): Kalypso Media
- Platform(s): Microsoft Windows
- Release: February 23, 2010
- Genre(s): Business simulation
- Mode(s): Single-player, Multiplayer, Cooperative multiplayer

M.U.D. TV (Mad Ugly Dirty TV) is a Business simulation game developed by Realmforge Studios and published by Kalypso Media for Microsoft Windows released on February 23, 2010. The game is centered on running a multi-media broadcasting business. The game is meant as a parody of many modern news stations.

== Reception ==
The Australian video game talk show Good Game's two reviewers gave the game a 6/10 and 8/10.

The Metacritic website has a global score of 53, based on 6 reviews, indicating a "mixed or average" reception. The best review was from PC Games (Germany), which reviewed it 78%.

== See also ==
- Mad TV, 1991 game with a similar premise
