= Lollypop (video game) =

1994 video game

- Developer(s): Brain Bug
- Publisher(s): Softgold; Rainbow Arts (Amiga); Ziggurat Interactive (digital)
- Designer(s): Ole Mogensen; Jacob Andersen; Søren Raadved Lund; Bjoern Naesby Nielsen; Jørgen Trolle Ørberg
- Programmer(s): Morten Mørup
- Artist(s): Jørgen Trolle Ørberg
- Composer(s): Thomas Mogensen; Torben Hansen
- Platform(s): MS-DOS, Amiga
- Release: 1994: MS-DOS; 1995: Amiga
- Genre(s): Platform
- Mode(s): Single-player

Lollypop is a platform game published in 1994 by Softgold Computerspiele GmbH on CD-ROM for MS-DOS. An Amiga version was released in 1995 by Rainbow Arts. It was developed by Brain Bug with the music provided by composers from the demogroup Vibrants. The game was rereleased by Ziggurat Interactive through GOG.com and Steam in January 2023.

== Reception ==
The game received mixed reviews. Amiga Joker magazine gave it 75% score, while PC Player gave it passable 61%.
