= Z-Out =

1990 video game

- Amiga cover art
- Developer: Rainbow Arts
- Publisher: Rainbow Arts
- Platforms: Amiga, Atari ST
- Release: 1990
- Genre: Scrolling shooter
- Modes: Single-player, multiplayer

Z-Out is a horizontally scrolling shooter released for the Amiga and Atari ST by Rainbow Arts in 1990. It is the sequel to X-Out, adding two-player cooperative play.

== Reception ==
While its critical reception was positive—particular praise went to its graphics—many reviewers noted that the game was unoriginal.
