= Got To Dance – Tylko Taniec season 2 =

Got To Dance – Tylko Taniec
- Season 2
- Hosted by: Maciej Dowbor; Katarzyna Kępka
- Judges: Joanna Liszowska; Michał Malitowski; Krystyna Mazurówna; Alan Anders

Release
- Original network: Polsat (also Polsat HD

Season chronology
- ← Previous; Season 1

The second season of Got to Dance - Tylko Taniec will begin in September 2012 Polsat. Dancers compete to win PLN 100,000.

The show airs on Polsat, also in HD, and is hosted by Maciej Dowbor, and Katarzyna Kępka The prize money is currently 100,000 PLN for the winning act.

== Auditions ==
Every contestant had to perform on precasting. Then after moving on dancers were allowed to dance in front of show judges, who picked 30 finalists after all auditions.

Pre-casting will take place in following cities

| City | Audition |
|---|---|
| Gdańsk | 19 May 2012 |
| Warsaw | 20 May 2012 |
| Olsztyn | 26 May 2012 |
| Gdańsk | 27 May 2012 |
| Kraków | 2 June 2012 |
| Wrocław | 3 June 2012 |
| Warsaw | 9 June 2012 |
| Poznań | 10 June 2012 |
