= Rainbow Arts =

German video game developer

Rainbow Arts Software GmbH
- Company type: Subsidiary
- Industry: Video games
- Founded: 1984; 42 years ago
- Founder: Marc Ullrich, Thomas Meiertoberens
- Defunct: 1999
- Fate: Merged
- Successor: THQ Deutschland
- Headquarters: Gütersloh, Germany
- Products: Turrican series
- Parent: Rushware (1986–1999)

Rainbow Arts Software GmbH was a German video game publisher based in Gütersloh.

== History ==
The company was founded in 1984 by Marc Ullrich and Thomas Meiertoberens and acquired by Rushware in 1986. The company's decline began in the early 1990s: The distributor did not manage to cover the costs of selling the titles worldwide, while development costs were constantly rising. The Rainbow Arts name lost its notoriety since then. The parent companies Rushware and Softgold were in turn bought up by the American games manufacturer THQ in 1999. In 1999, Funsoft Holding, which acquired Rushware and sister company Softgold in 1992, sold Rushware to THQ, which was incorporated into THQ Deutschland, THQ's German operations arm.

Rainbow Arts also led one of the first lawsuits in 1993 on the question whether competition exists between a software company and a bulletin board system of similar name ("Rainbow BBS") operated by a student, so that claims under trademark law are enforceable. This was confirmed by the Munich District Court.

In January 2022, Ziggurat Interactive acquired more than 80 titles from Rainbow Arts.

== Games ==
- 3001 O'Connor's Fight
- Apprentice
- The Baby of Can Guru
- Bad Cat
- Black Gold
- Der Blaue Kristall
- Blockout (Amiga, Atari ST, MS-DOS)
- Bozuma
- Circus Attractions
- Claim to Power
- Conqueror
- The Curse of RA
- Day of the Pharaoh
- Danger Freak
- Denaris
- Down at the Trolls
- Earthworm Jim (MS-DOS)
- Earthworm Jim 2 (MS-DOS)
- East vs. West: Berlin 1948
- Future Tank
- Flies: Attack on Earth
- Garrison
- Garrison II: The Legend Continues
- Graffiti Man
- Grand Monster Slam
- The Great Giana Sisters
- Hard'n'Heavy
- Hurra Deutschland
- Imperium Romanum
- In 80 Days Around the World
- Jinks
- Katakis
- Khalaan
- Legend of Faerghail
- Logical
- Lollypop
- Mr. Pingo
- Money Molch
- M.U.D.S. – Mean Ugly Dirty Sport
- Mad TV
- Madness
- Masterblazer
- Mystery of the Mummy
- Nibbler (Amstrad CPC)
- Oxxonian
- Galactic Attack (Windows)
- Realm of the Trolls
- Rock'n Roll
- R-Type (Commodore 64)
- Rendering Ranger: R2
- Sarcophaser
- Shufflepuck Café (Amiga, MS-DOS)
- Sky Fighter
- Soldier
- Spaceball
- Spherical
- St. Thomas
- Starball
- StarTrash
- Street Cat
- Sunny Shine on the Funny Side of Life
- Thunder Boy
- To Be on Top
- Turrican
- Turrican II: The Final Fight
- Turrican 3: Payment Day
- Time
- Vision: The 5 Dimension Utopia
- Volleyball Simulator
- Warriors
- X-Out
- Z-Out
