= East vs. West: Berlin 1948 =

1989 video game

- Developer: Time Warp
- Publisher: Rainbow Arts
- Designer: Stephan Graf
- Platforms: MS-DOS, Amiga, Atari ST
- Release: 1989
- Genre: Adventure
- Mode: Single-player

East vs. West: Berlin 1948 is an adventure game developed by Time Warp Productions and published by Rainbow Arts in 1989. The game uses an audio cassette to supplement the soundtrack. It uses a top-down perspective that gives the a player a bird's eye view of the action.

== Gameplay ==
Character interaction

Berlin 1948 is set in the city of Berlin during the Cold War. The city is split into West and East Berlin, and the USSR has all supply routes into the city cut off. In order to prevent West Berlin from being overrun by the Red Army, the US Army has smuggled an atomic bomb into the city. The bomb disappears, and it is up to you to find it before it falls into Stalin's hands.

You play a US spy in the CIA, Sam Porter, and have to travel all over the city looking for the bomb. You can walk around, or you can go to various destinations by taxi. You talk to many characters along the way, and interact with a number of objects in order to unravel the mystery. Most of the Berliners have nothing to offer you, so you are challenged with finding the ones who do. Some will tell the truth, some will lie, and some don't even know they possess information that would be of value.

Berlin 1948 imposes a time limit for solving the mystery and finding the atomic bomb. Running out of time causes you to be run over by a car, ending the game.

== Development ==
Berlin 1948 incorporated an audio cassette in the gameplay. Since the speech synthesizers of the time were not very sophisticated, and recorded sound took up too much disk space, the game designers took an inventive approach. At different times during the game (such as the Intro and other cinematic sequences) you are asked to play the appropriate audio clip on a home cassette deck.

== Reception ==
A 1991 Computer Gaming World survey of strategy and war games gave it three stars out of five.
