= Live to Dance =

Television series

- Genre: Reality
- Based on: Got to Dance Created by Shine TV and Princess Productions
- Directed by: Russell Norman
- Presented by: Andrew Günsberg
- Judges: Paula Abdul; Kimberly Wyatt; Travis Payne
- Country of origin: United States
- Original language: English
- No. of seasons: 1
- No. of episodes: 7

Production
- Executive producers: Elisabeth Murdoch; Howard T. Owens; Robin Ashbrook; Anthony Dominici; James Sunderland; Paula Abdul
- Production company: Reveille Productions

Original release
- Network: CBS
- Release: January 4 – February 9, 2011

Related
- Got to Dance

Live to Dance is an American television reality television series and dance competition on the CBS network based on the British series Got to Dance. Dancers from all over the country auditioned for Live to Dance in "specially constructed Dance Domes".

Resembling the British dance competition series Got to Dance, the show was first shown on January 4, 2011, and was headlined by the American Idol judge Paula Abdul as lead judge with Andrew Günsberg as host. Judging alongside Abdul were Kimberly Wyatt, the former member of Pussycat Dolls, and Michael Jackson's long-time choreographer Travis Payne. The show was intended to rival So You Think You Can Dance and unlike most other reality shows, allowed dancers of all ages to compete. The series was not renewed for a second season.

An Australian version was filmed in 2011. However, it never aired due to a scheduling conflict by another reality dance competition series Everybody Dance Now in 2012.

== Auditions ==
Auditions were held in Los Angeles and New York City inside the Dance Dome.

== Top 18 ==
Bold Print means that the contestant was chosen by the judges/viewers to compete in the Semi-Finals via the Dance-Off.

Top 18
D'Angelo & Amanda
Bev & Hap
Jalen
The Vibe
Tap Sounds Underground
Jill & Jacob
Kendall Glover
Jittin' Genius
Dax & Sarah
Dance Town Chaos
Du-Shant Stegall
Shore Thing
Roosevelt Anderson
Austen Acevedo
Dance in Flight
Twitch
Chi-Town Finest Breakers
White Tree Fine Art

=== Dance-Off ===
Contestant(s)	Result
Kendall Glover	Judges' Choice
White Tree Fine Art	Viewers' Choice
Theatrix	Eliminated
Inside the Box	Eliminated

== Semi-finals ==
=== Round 1 ===
Order	Contestant(s)	Song(s) performed to	Stars			Result
Order	Contestant(s)	Song(s) performed to	Wyatts	Abdul	Pagne	Result
1	The Vibe	"Smooth Criminal" by Michael Jackson	★	★	★	Judges' Choice
2	Jittin' Genius	"I Can Transform Ya" by Chris Brown "Fancy Footwork" by Chromeo	★	★	★	Eliminated (Viewers' 2nd)
3	Chi-Town Finest Breakers	"I Want You Back" by Jackson 5 "The Love You Save" by Jackson 5 "Rappers Delight" by Sugarhill Gang	★	★	★	Eliminated
4	Austen Acevedo	"Getting Over You" by David Guetta	★	★	★	Eliminated
5	Bev & Hap	"Boom Boom Pow" by The Black Eyed Peas	★	★	★	Eliminated
6	D'Angelo & Amanda	"Hip Hip Chin Chin" by Club des Belugas "Conga" by Gloria Estefan	★	★	★	Viewers' Choice

=== Round 2 ===
Order	Contestant(s)	Song(s) performed to	Stars			Result
Order	Contestant(s)	Song(s) performed to	Wyatts	Abdul	Pagne	Result
1	Jalen	"U Can't Touch This" by MC Hammer	★	★	★	Eliminated
2	Dance in Flight	"The Pink Panther Theme" by Henry Mancini	★	★	★	Eliminated
3	Twitch	"Apologize" by OneRepublic	★	★	★	Viewers' Choice
4	Du-Shant Stegall	"OMG" by Usher	★	★	★	Eliminated
5	Dax & Sarah	"Tu Vuò Fà L'Americano" by Renato Carosone / "We No Speak Americano" by Yolanda Be Cool	★	★	★	Eliminated
6	White Tree Fine Art	"Hallelujah" by Alexandra Burke	★	★	★	Judges' Choice

=== Round 3 ===
Order	Contestant(s)	Song(s) performed to	Stars			Result
Order	Contestant(s)	Song(s) performed to	Wyatts	Abdul	Pagne	Result
1	Dance Town Chaos	"It's a Man's Man's Man's World" by Seal	★	★	★	Judges' Choice
2	Jill & Jacob	"Save Me" by Nicki Minaj	★	★	★	Eliminated
3	Roosevelt Anderson	"Rocketeer" by Far East Movement	★	★	★	Eliminated
4	Tap Sounds Underground		★	★	★	Eliminated
5	Shore Thing		★	★	★	Eliminated
6	Kendall Glover	"Firework" by Katy Perry	★	★	★	Viewers' Choice

=== Finalists ===
Contestant(s)	Number of Gold Stars	Result
Twitch	3	
White Tree Fine Art	3	Third place
The Vibe	2	
Kendall Glover	3	Runner-up
Dance Town Chaos	3	
D'Angelo & Amanda	3	Winners

== Ratings ==
The series premiere was watched by 10.2 million viewers and was the most watched program of January 4, 2011. It additionally managed to pull a 2.4 in the Adults 18-49 demographic. The second episode, which aired in its normal timeslot of Wednesdays at eight p.m., fell hard from those numbers pulling 7.788 million viewers and a 1.8 in the Adults 18-49 demographic.

Episode	Date	Total Viewers	18-49 Demo
1	January 4, 2011	10.2m	2.4
2	January 5, 2011	7.7m	1.8
3	January 12, 2011	6.15m	1.5
4	January 19, 2011	5.081m	1.0
5	January 26, 2011	4.512m	1.0
6	February 2, 2011	4.749m	0.9
7	February 9, 2011	4.706m	0.9
