= Johanna Klum =

German television presenter

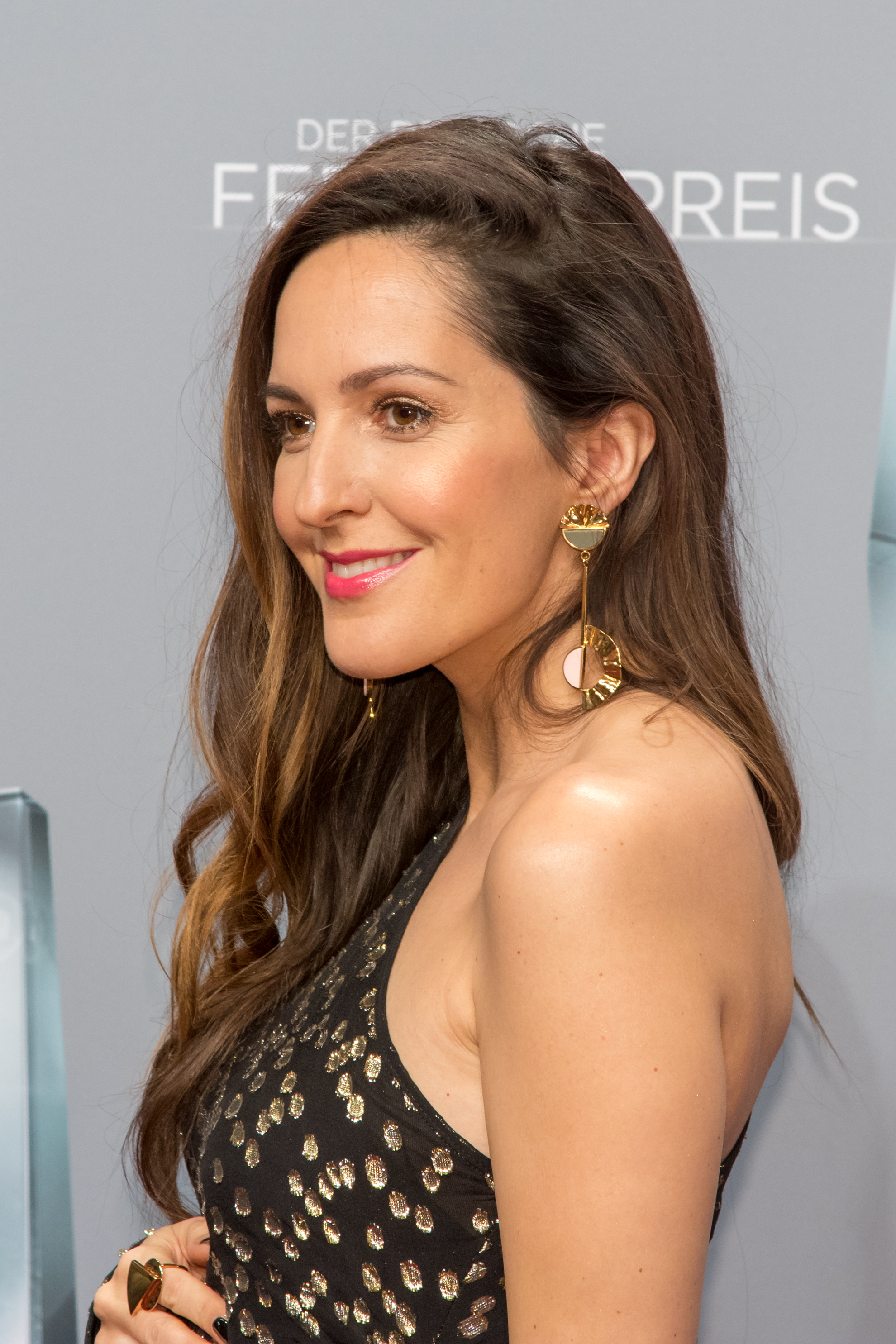
Klum in 2018

Johanna Klum (born 12 July 1980 in Berlin) is a German television presenter.

== Career ==
Klum was a member of the German girl band Samajona until 2002, after which she became the presenter of Total Request Live on MTV.

In 2005, she started working for VIVA, where she presented the show 17, now presenting the follow-up VIVA Live!, with her colleagues Gülcan Kamps, Collien Fernandes, and Klaas Heufer-Umlauf.

In 2007, she presented the show Popstars – Das Magazin, which referred to the sixth season of Popstars under the title Popstars on Stage. The show aired on both VIVA and Pro7, the original Popstars channel.

In the first two seasons (2013 and 2014), she was a host on the dance show Got to Dance on ProSieben and Sat.1. From 2015 to 2016, she co-hosted the show Superkids - Die größten kleinen Talente der Welt with Wayne Carpendale.
