= Emergency 5 =

2014 video game

- Emergency 5 European cover art
- Developer: Sixteen Tons Entertainment
- Publishers: Promotion Software; Koch Media
- Series: Emergency
- Platforms: Windows, macOS
- Release: 2014
- Mode: Multiplayer

Emergency 5 is the fifth game and the final installment in the Emergency series, published in 2014 for Windows and macOS.

== Reception ==
The reception of Emergency 5 was mixed. On Metacritic it has a score of 53 out of 100 based on reviews from 6 critics.

- PC Games December 21, 2014 – 60% ″A game as an emergency.″
- Gamestar December 5, 2014 - 67% ″More fun than any Emergency before, but with blunders.″
- Games.cz February 2, 2015 - 70% ″Emergency 5 is definitely not for everyone, but if you like real-time strategy and you prefer unconventional content, it is a game for you.″
- 4Players December 3, 2014 - 39% ″Short-term entertaining, but unfinished rescue strategy that suffers from its mistakes.″
- Gamecontrast.de December 21, 2014 - 73% "After Emergency 5 had to fight many problems at its release, the title finally exploits its potential."
