= Mystery of the Mummy (1988 video game) =

- Developer: Time Warp Software
- Publisher: Rainbow Arts
- Platforms: Amiga, Commodore 64, MS-DOS
- Release: 1988
- Genre: Adventure

Mystery of the Mummy is an adventure video game developed by Time Warp Software and published by Rainbow Arts. It was released in 1988 for Amiga, Commodore 64, and MS-DOS.

== Gameplay ==
Mystery of the Mummy is an icon-driven adventure game where players investigate a stolen mummy by driving around town, gathering clues, objects, and information. It includes two activity diversions: diving for exhibits and analyzing lab evidence. Players must manage sleep, food, and car fuel. Puzzles rely on saying the right name at the right time, and players can enter the library to read books.

== Reception ==
Reception

Review scores
Publication	Score
64'er	93%
Datormagazin	6/10
Games Preview	58%
Power Play	7/10
The Games Machine	58%

British game magazine The Games Machine gave the game a score of 58 out of 100 stating "Mystery of the Mummy mixes interesting presentation ideas and fairly good interaction with, sadly, design faults that give the adventure an empty, unfulfilling atmosphere".
