= Mad TV (video game) =

1991 video game

- Developer(s): Rainbow Arts
- Publisher(s): Rainbow Arts
- Platform(s): Amiga, MS-DOS, Atari ST
- Release: EU: 1991
- Genre(s): Business simulation
- Mode(s): Single-player

Mad TV is a television station management simulation video game published in 1991 by Rainbow Arts. The game puts the player in the role of a new program director for a TV station. The player is in charge of selecting programming and earning advertising for the station, while simultaneously trying to marry Betty, an attractive woman working in the building.

== Gameplay ==
The main interface of the game involves moving a thin man through a multistory building via mouse clicks. By clicking on various doors, the player's character can enter other locations, which are portrayed in cut scenes. Each day is timed, and after eight game hours the day of programming ends.

For each day, the player must program seven hours of television and provide an advertisement block for each of those programs. The game offers many options to fill programming, such as purchasing the rights to classic movies and shows, or by producing your own shows. However, programming must be regularly cycled, otherwise it gets stale with the audience and produces low ratings.

Advertising is also offered via contracts, which require certain rating marks to pay out. For example, a contract for Nike might pay better than one for a local business, but the Nike contract will require substantially more viewers. Access to more viewers can be achieved by buying more transmitters and satellites.

The player competes against two other television stations, run by computer-controlled program directors, in the same building. These program directors inhabit the same space and locations as the player, and they can directly influence the game by outbidding the player for certain movies or sabotaging programming lineups.

The eventual goal of the game is to win Betty's love. She is a cultural reporter who works on the top floor of the building. The other television station directors are also competing for Betty. Her affection rises when the player airs her culture program or buys her gifts, ranging from fur coats to diamond rings. Furthermore, Betty's love depends indirectly on the reputation the player has (which in turn depends on several factors such as ratings). Her affection level will never outrun the player's reputation level, so there is no use in simply pleasing her and neglecting the audience. Unfortunately cultural programs are not popular; airing only Betty's favorites will cause bankruptcy. The player has to balance his budget.

The game suffers from text translation issues, resulting from its origin as a game originally produced in Germany. Much of the in-game text features typos and Denglisch.

== Legacy ==
The sequel, Mad TV 2, was only released in Germany. In 2001 Mad TV and also Mad TV 2 were released as freeware.

== See also ==
- M.U.D. TV, another television station simulation game
