= Willi wills wissen =

German children's show

- Cover of the episode "Wie wird man Astronaut?" ("How to become an astronaut?") on DVD
- Genre: Edutainment
- Created by: Andreas M. Reinhard (BR) together with Megaherz Film und Fernsehen
- Presented by: Willi Weitzel
- Composers: Dieter Holesch and Ecco Meineke
- Country of origin: Germany
- Original language: German
- No. of seasons: 8
- No. of episodes: 174

Production
- Producers: Franz Xaver Gernstl and Fidelis Mager
- Running time: 25 minutes
- Production companies: Bayerischer Rundfunk, Institut für Film und Bild in Wissenschaft und Unterricht, Megaherz Film und Fernsehen

Original release
- Release: May 6, 2002

Willi wills wissen (German for "Willi wants to know it") was a children's program focused on factual issues and everyday occurrences, produced by Megaherz Film und Fernsehen on behalf of the Bayerischer Rundfunk with the Institut für Film und Bild in Wissenschaft und Unterricht. The program was first broadcast on KiKA from 2002 to 2010, and was regularly repeated on Das Erste and some regional channels of the ARD. The producers were Franz Xaver Gernstl and Fidelis Mager.

== Plot ==
The program had a uniform subject that was geared to specific life situations: the reporter Willi Weitzel tried to give young viewers insights into various topics and professions, for example police officer, train driver, fisherman, soldier, journalist, butcher, farmer, emergency doctor or mayor. To do this, he visited representatives of these professions, accompanied them for a working day, had their work explained to him and discussed it with them.

In this way, Weitzel not only provided information about professions, but also provided insights into the lives of the blind, hearing impaired or homeless people, Jews, Sinti and Roma, for example. In one of the episodes he was a guest at a boarding school.

== Incident in November 2003 ==
For the filming of the episode Was ist ohne Obdach los? the reporter Willi Weitzel spent the night on 9 November 2003 with five homeless people at the Neptunbrunnen in the Alter Botanischer Garten in Munich. The camera team left the sleeping area around 10 pm. At around 1.30 am, Willi Weitzel woke up with a bleeding wound on his head that had to be sewn with five stitches. The perpetrators, who attacked him with a baseball bat while he was asleep, were initially able to escape undetected, but were later caught by the police.

== "Willi wills wissen" as an internet phenomenon in June 2020 ==
In June 2020, a compilation of several short excerpts from the program was uploaded to a YouTube channel under the title "Willi wills wissen Clips ohne Kontext". The video received hundreds of thousands of views within a short period of time. Similar versions quickly spread to other social media such as Instagram and TikTok.

The various videos as "Willi Memes" or "Willi wills Wissen Memes" achieved widespread popularity due to the statements made by Willi Weitzel, including possible sexual innuendos, black humor and, in particular, jokes against children and other people in wheelchairs (episode 126 "Was geht im Rollstuhl?"). The context of the statements was not or only incompletely recognizable.

The rapper Manuellsen then published a video in which he insulted the host of the show as a "son of a bitch". Weitzel then published a statement on Facebook in which he wrote that those who are outraged by the film clips and see discrimination in the videos fell for those who tore the videos out of context.

== Gute Frage, nächste Frage! ==
Since 11 October 2006, the series Gute Frage, nächste Frage! has been broadcast as a three to four-minute gap filler, in which Willi answers questions in a studio that children have asked him by letter or e-mail. With experiments, graphics or film clips, the reporter provides short and concise explanations.

== Willi und die Wunder dieser Welt ==
In 2008 Weitzel shot the film Willi und die Wunder dieser Welt in Australia, Algeria, Tokyo, the Canadian Arctic and in Germany. The adventure film was released on 5 March 2009 and was the most successful German documentary film of 2009 with around 450,000 admissions.

== Von A–Z ==
The format Willi wills wissen von A–Z has existed since 2010. In the ten-minute episodes, terms are explained for each letter of the alphabet by showing excerpts from Willi wills wissen. A random letter generator determines at the beginning of each sequence which letter it is about. With "H", for example, Willi goes to a wedding (German Hochzeit), looks around a chicken farm (German Hühnerhof), tries on lumberjack trousers (German Holzfällerhose) or finds out a lot about rabbits (German Hasen).

== Awards ==
2003

- Emil of the television magazine TV Spielfilm for the episodeWie ist das mit dem Tod?
- Bayerischer Fernsehpreis
- Erich-Kästner-Fernsehpreis for the episode Wie ist das mit dem Tod?

2004

- Robert-Geisendörfer-Preis of the Evangelical Church for the episodes Was heißt hier eigentlich behindert? and Was ist ohne Obdach los?
- Journalistenpreis from the Diakonie Baden und Württemberg for the episode Was heißt hier eigentlich behindert?

2006

- Das Silberne Pferd, Media award from the deutscher Reiter- und Fahrerverband (DRFV) for the episode Wo zeigen Pferde was sie können?

2007

- HEUREKA Journalistenpreis for the episode Was geht im Rollstuhl?

2010

- Adolf-Grimme-Preis for the episode Wie macht der Künstler Kunst?
