= Emergency 4: Global Fighters for Life =

2006 video game

- Emergency 4 box art
- Developer: Sixteen Tons Entertainment
- Publishers: EU: Take-Two Interactive; UK: Bluestone Interactive
- Series: Emergency
- Platform: Windows
- Release: EU: April 13, 2006
- Genre: Real-time strategy
- Modes: Single player, Multiplayer

911: First Responders
- 911: First Responders box art
- Developer: Empire Interactive
- Publisher: NA: Atari
- Platform: Windows
- Release: NA: June 22, 2007

Emergency 4: Global Fighters for Life (known as 911: First Responders in North America) is a simulation video game developed by German studio Sixteen Tons Entertainment allowing users to manage emergency services on a variety of accidents and/or accident scenes.

== Gameplay ==
Directed by their supervisor, the player assumes the role of an incident commander, and is charged with managing a number of vehicles and staff from the fire department, medical rescue, police, and technical services. Progression has been expanded, with a mandatory free-play interlude that involves completing certain objectives.

The game includes 20 missions, as well as the ability to manage a team of emergency response vehicles and professionals.

Emergency 4 boasts several improvements in user-friendliness over previous games in the Emergency series. For instance, it is possible to dispatch multiple vehicles at the same time and order them to arrive at a specific location. Casualties, criminals and fires are now properly marked on the map, and a counter now indicates the amount of casualties still present in the area. Doctors, firefighters and marksmen have better automation.

A deluxe release includes three extra oversea missions and support for voice commands.
