= Emergency 2: The Ultimate Fight for Life =

2002 video game

- Series: Emergency
- Platform(s): Microsoft Windows
- Release: 2003
- Mode(s): Single player

Emergency 2: The Ultimate Fight for Life is the second game in the Emergency series, published in 2003.

== Reception ==
On Metacritic the game has a score of 55% based on reviews from 5 critics.

== Reviews ==
- PC Games (Germany) - Nov, 2002
- GameStar (Germany) - Nov, 2002
- GameSpot - Apr 24, 2003
