= Michael Malitowski =

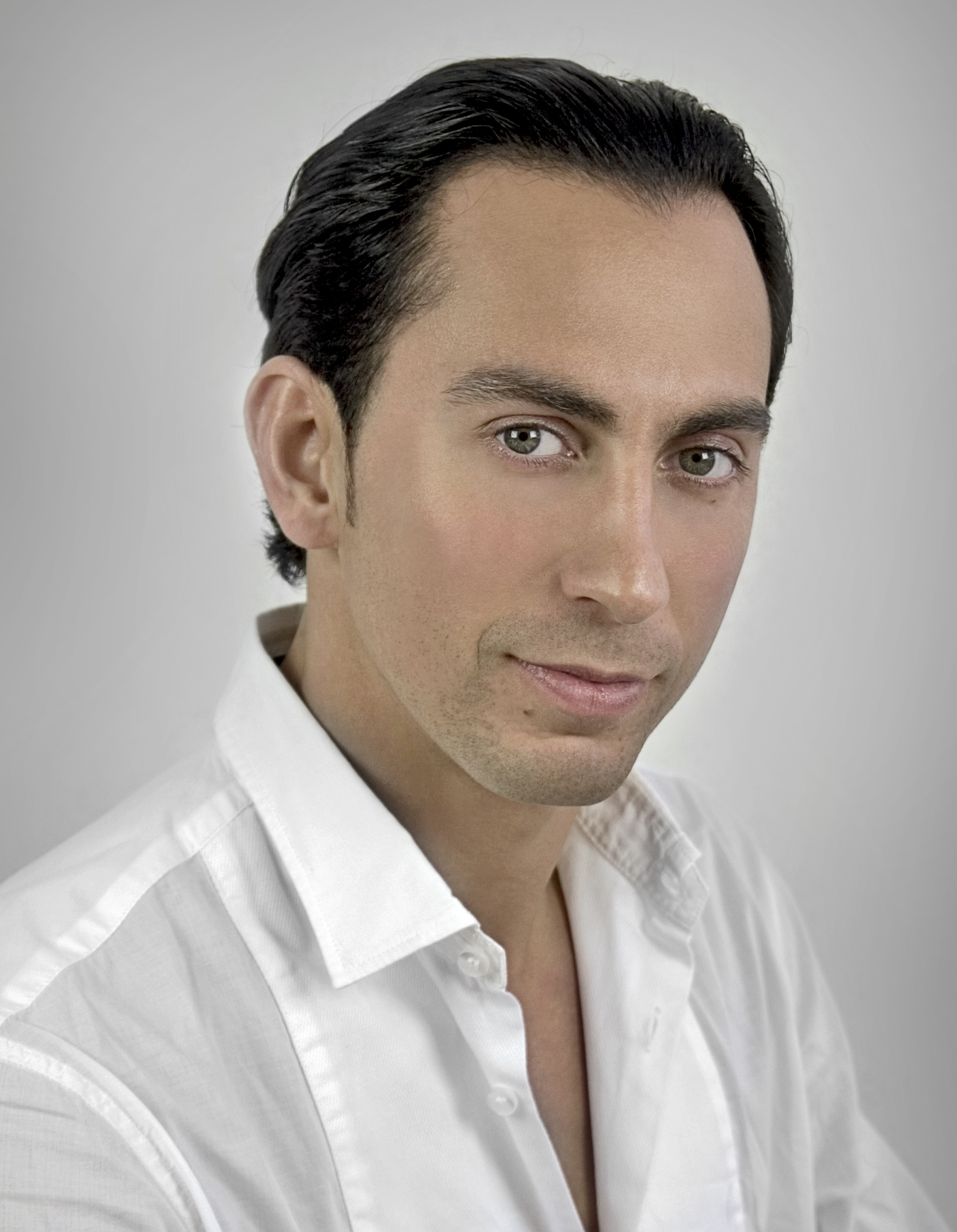
- Born: May 28, 1980 (age 45); Zielona Góra, Poland
- Occupation: Ballroom dancer

Michael Malitowski is a ballroom dancer, a former World Latin Dance Champion with his partner Joanna Leunis. Michael (christened Michał) was born 28 May 1980, in Zielona Góra, Poland. His partnership with Leunis has, since 2002, resulted in a string of victories: in 2008 and 2009 they won the World Professional Latin title, and in 2012 they won first place in Latin dance at the Blackpool Dance Festival. This is the prestigious Open British Championships held every year in Blackpool, England. Before that, he won the Polish Latin dance championship four times with Iwona Golczak.
