= Battle of Yavin =

Fictional battle in the Star Wars franchise

The Battle of Yavin is a key event in the fictional universe of Star Wars, in which the Galactic Empire confronts the Rebel Alliance around the gas giant Yavin and its fourth moon. It serves as the chronological reference point for the franchise’s in-universe dating system, with years denoted as Before or After the Battle of Yavin (BBY/ABY).

== Universe ==
A blue lightsaber, the weapon of the Jedi, and a red lightsaber, the weapon of the Sith.

The Star Wars universe is set in a galaxy inhabited by humans and various alien species. It centers on the conflict between Jedi Knights and Sith Lords, Force-sensitive individuals who possess psychic abilities. The Jedi use the light side of the Force to maintain peace, while the Sith draw on the dark side to pursue power and domination.

Since Disney's acquisition of Lucasfilm, Star Wars exists in two versions: "Legends" and "Canon." Both include the six original films and the series The Clone Wars. "Legends" includes additional content released before 2014 in books, comics, games, and TV movies. "Canon" includes all material released since 2014.

The Battle of Yavin marks the first major victory of the Jedi/light side-aligned Rebel Alliance over the Sith-controlled Galactic Empire.

After the Rebels obtain the plans for the Death Star, a massive Imperial space station with planet-destroying capability, the Empire locates the Rebel base on Yavin 4 and brings the Death Star there to eliminate it. A hidden structural weakness is discovered, prompting the Rebels to launch a last-ditch assault. As the Death Star enters orbit, Rebel starfighters engage Imperial forces led by Darth Vader. Luke Skywalker, using the Force, successfully exploits the station’s vulnerability and destroys it. Vader survives and escapes.

The event is depicted in the 1977 film Star Wars: Episode IV – A New Hope. (Note: Entitled Star Wars, when first released in 1977.) It was produced primarily using practical special effects and is further explored in related novels, comics, and video games.

== In-universe background ==
=== Official Universe (Disney canon) ===
The Death Star's existence and purpose is a tightly-kept secret within the highest echelons of the Galactic Empire, with its existence known to the wider Empire as Project Celestial Power and the Energy Initiative, ostensibly to provide Imperial planets with sustainable and unlimited energy sources, including those ravaged by the Clone Wars, to further solidify Imperial authority. Joints for the Death Star's superlaser dish were assembled at Imperial prison complexes such as the one on Narkina 5, after which they were shipped to Scarif to be used in its construction. A prisoner uprising on Narkina 5 resulted in many prisoners escaping, among them Cassian Andor; while the wider galaxy was made aware of the prison conditions, none of the prisoners found out what the joints were used for. Other missions throughout the galaxy hinted at the Death Star's existence but usually led to a dead end, with one mission to Geonosis to protect the last surviving Geonosian who survived the Empire's genocide of the species attempting to tell the Ghost crew and Saw about the weapon but with no success, as well as Saw investigating shipments of kyber crystals from Jedha but ultimately not discovering their intended destination.

Engineer Galen Erso, involved in the Death Star’s design, secretly adds a fatal flaw after forcibly being recruited by Director Orson Krennic. He sends a message to Saw, urging his daughter Jyn Erso to retrieve the plans. At around the same time, its true purpose was leaked from Dedra's files by another supervisor and Axis network spy Lonni Jung, who passed it to Luthen, while he killed Jung to ensure his silence. Dedra, who learned the identity of Axis as Luthen from the files as well as the weapon's existence despite her illegal possession of them from having the files forwarded to her by mistake, attempted to confront him on her own at his shop. Luthen attempted suicide during the confrontation to prevent his interrogation, prompting Kleya to infiltrate the hospital he was held at and disconnect him from life support. Dedra's reckless actions as well as her possession of the files and failure to report the error marked the end of her career, as she was later arrested and interrogated by Krennic, mistakenly implicating her as a rebel spy and leading to her imprisonment at an Imperial labor facility. Kleya was rescued by Cassian on an unsanctioned mission and the information was passed on to Rebel Alliance leadership, but they doubted the weapon's existence due to their strained relationship with Luthen, who manipulated events to ensure the Alliance would formally organize against the Empire. Cassian was sent to the Ring of Kafrene to verify its existence and later to rescue Jyn from Imperial captivity to learn more about the Death Star from her, as well as recruiting her to their cause.

With further information about the Death Star and its capabilities known to Alliance leadership, they are divided on how to combat the threat, with Mon Mothma planning to surrender to Palpatine. Jyn defies orders and leads a small team with the improvised callsign Rogue One to the Imperial archive on Scarif. Rogue One is initially heavily outnumbered, but receives support from the newly-arrived Alliance Fleet. A battle follows, both on the planet and in space involving rebel forces and Imperial troops led by Darth Vader. Jyn successfully transmits the Death Star plans before the station destroys the facility. The plans are received by the Tantive IV, which escapes under Princess Leia Organa's command.

=== Legends Universe ===
On the planet Toprawa, Rebel agents steal the Death Star plans and transmit them to the orbiting Tantive IV. The ship is intercepted by Darth Vader’s Star Destroyer and forced to flee.

=== Prelude ===
The Tantive IV is intercepted by Darth Vader's Star Destroyer above Tatooine. Before capture, Princess Leia Organa hides the Death Star plans in the droid R2-D2, who escapes in a pod with C-3PO. On the planet’s surface, the droids are captured by Jawas and sold to Owen Lars, who assigns them to his nephew, Luke Skywalker. Luke discovers Leia’s message intended for Jedi Master Obi-Wan Kenobi, requesting help for the Rebellion. R2-D2 leaves to find Kenobi, followed by Luke and C-3PO. After an ambush by Tusken Raiders, they are rescued by Kenobi and taken to his home.

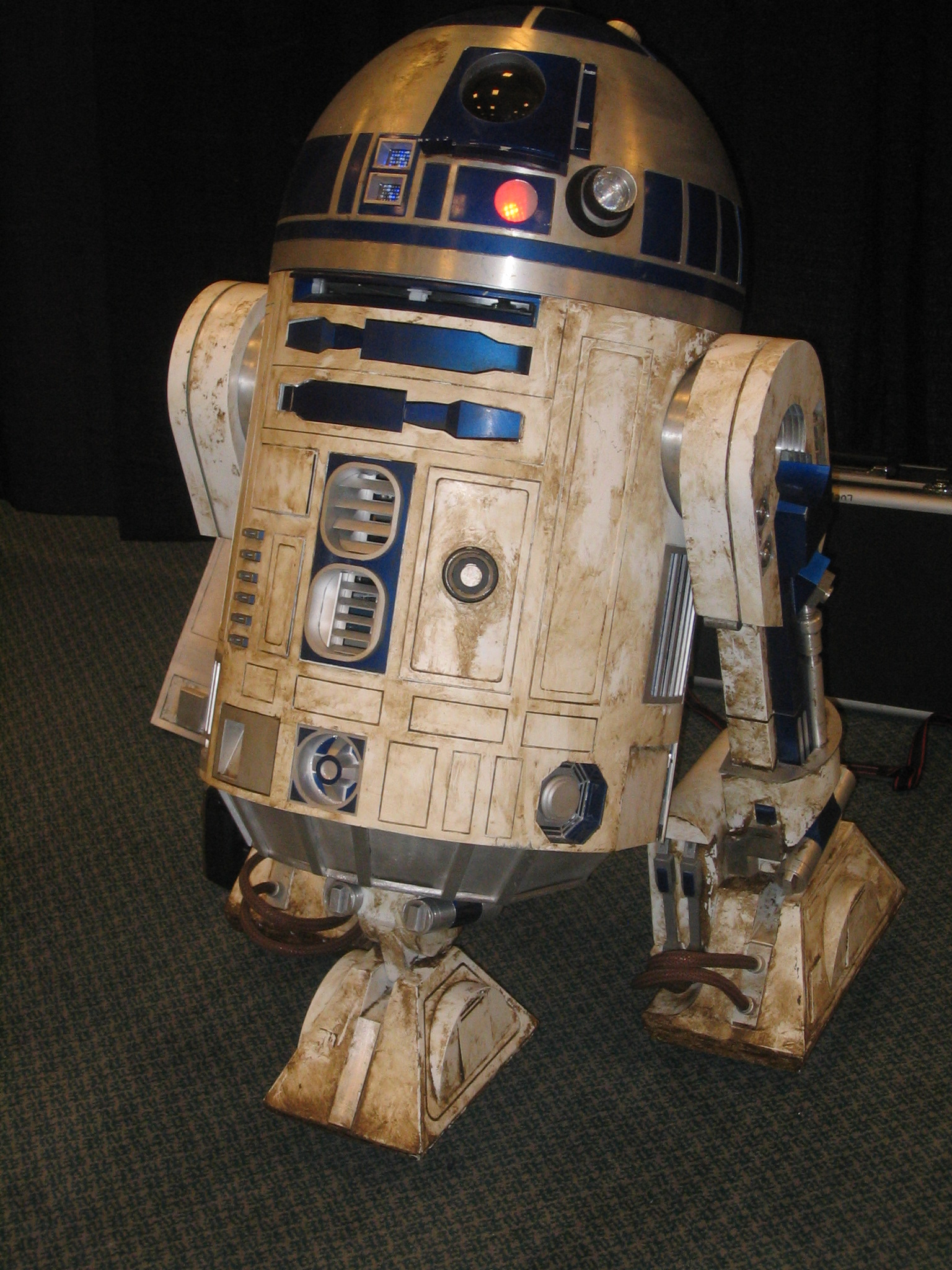
After escaping from the Tantive IV, R2-D2 keeps the Death Star plans until he returns to Yavin 4.

Meanwhile, Leia is imprisoned aboard the Death Star. With the Imperial Senate dissolved, she loses her political immunity. Grand Moff Tarkin demands the location of the Rebel base and threatens to destroy Alderaan. Although Leia names Dantooine, Tarkin orders Alderaan’s destruction.

On Tatooine, Luke learns his father was a Jedi, and Kenobi gives him his father’s lightsaber. Upon discovering his aunt and uncle killed by Imperial troops, Luke decides to join Kenobi and the droids. In Mos Eisley, they hire smugglers Han Solo and Chewbacca to transport them to Alderaan. Pursued by stormtroopers, they flee the planet aboard the Millennium Falcon.

The group exits hyperspace into an asteroid field where Alderaan once existed. Following Imperial fighters, they approach a moon—only to realize it is the Death Star. Captured by a tractor beam, they infiltrate the station disguised as stormtroopers and rescue Leia. Obi-Wan Kenobi confronts Darth Vader, ultimately sacrificing himself so the others can escape.

They reach the Rebel base on Yavin 4, where R2-D2 delivers the Death Star plans. Rebel engineers identify a structural weakness. However, the Empire had placed a tracker on the Falcon, allowing Tarkin and Vader to locate the base and send the Death Star to destroy it.

== Battlefield ==
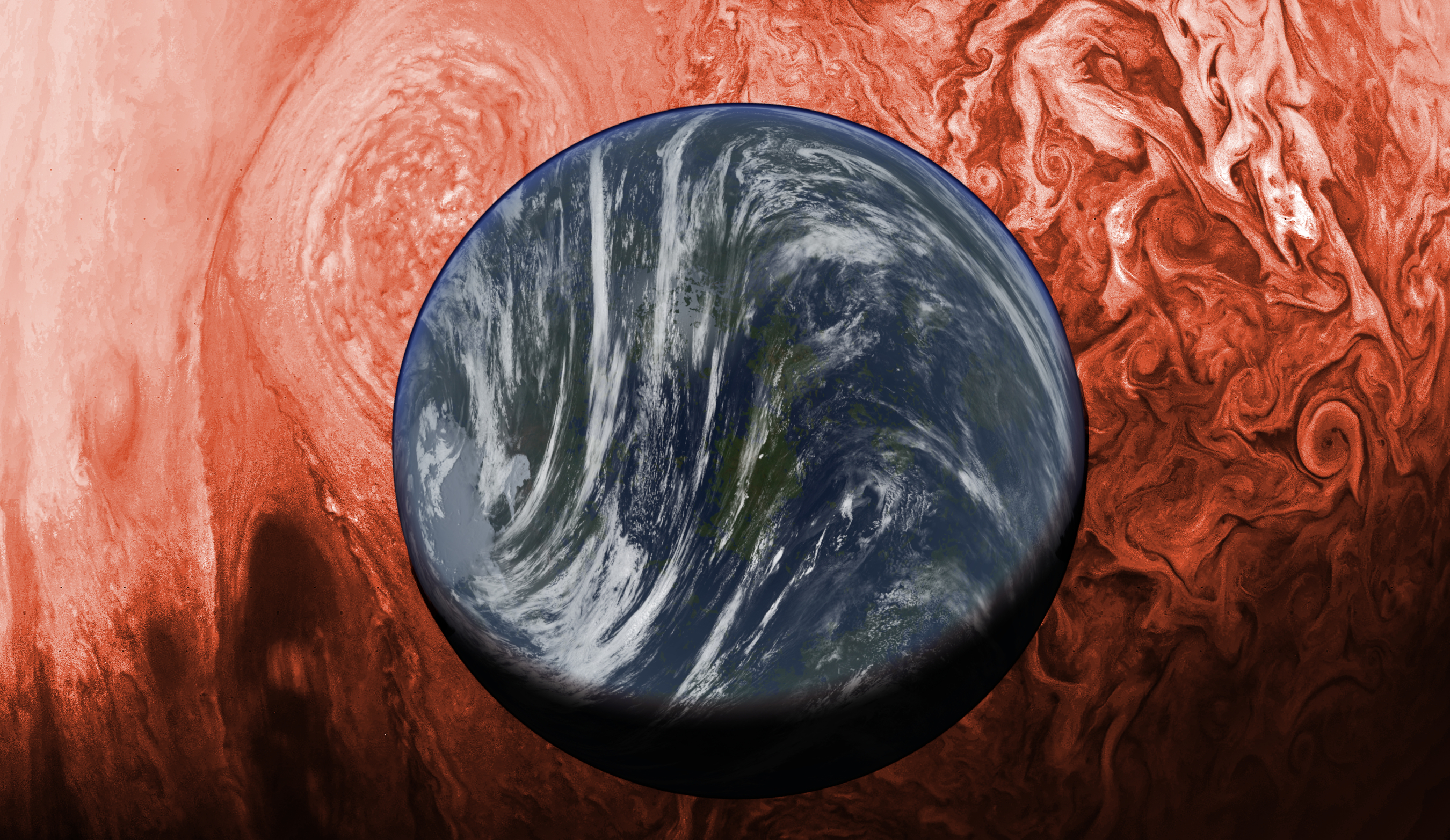
Artist's view of Yavin 4 around Yavin.

The battle takes place in orbit around the gas giant Yavin, near its fourth moon, Yavin 4. It occurs both in open space and within the Death Star’s surface trenches.

== Forces ==
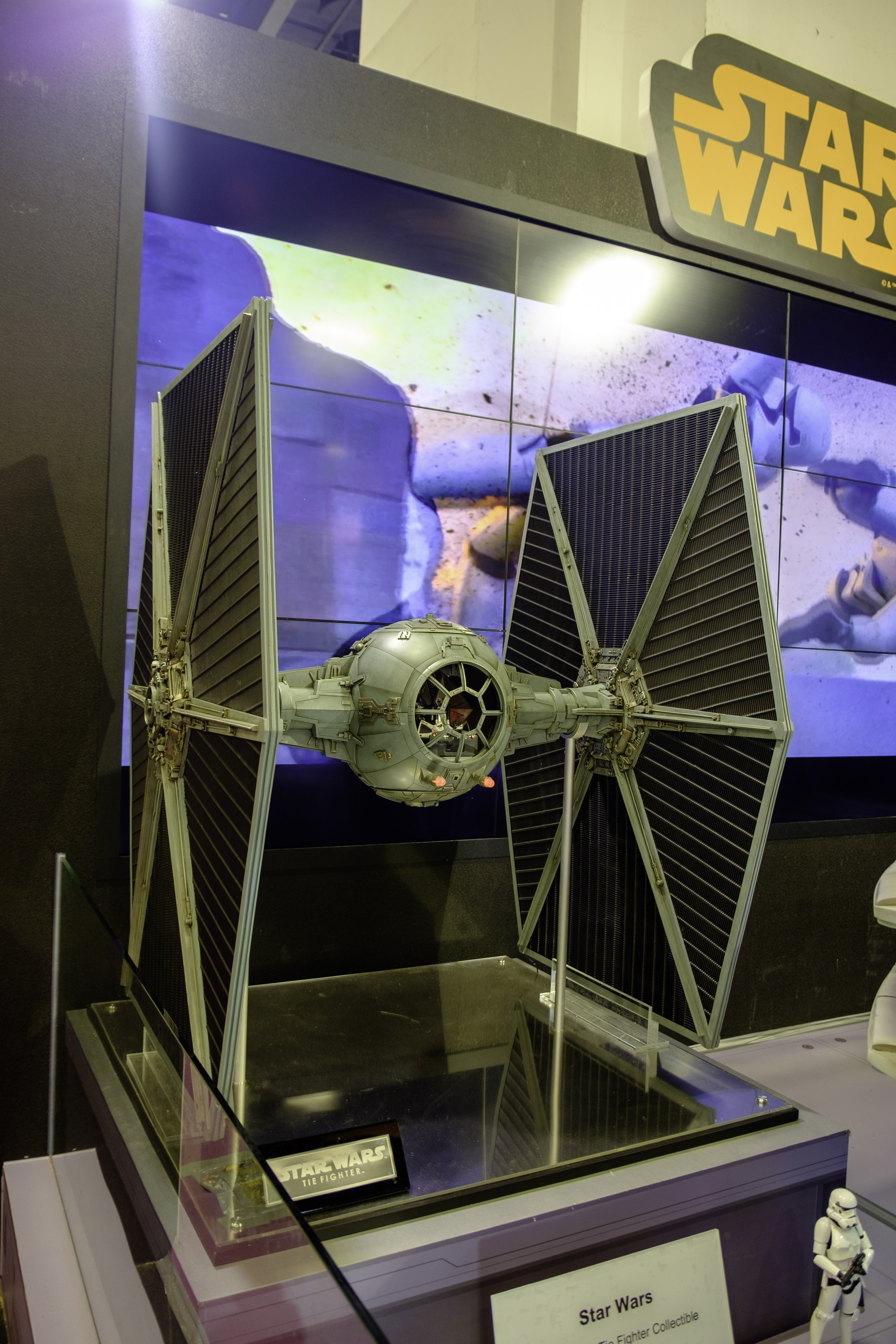
Model of a TIE fighter.

The Imperial forces consist of the Death Star, a mobile battle station capable of destroying entire planets, supported by TIE fighters, the Empire’s standard combat vessels. Darth Vader participates in the battle aboard his customized TIE Advanced X1, optimized for performance and fitted to his armor.

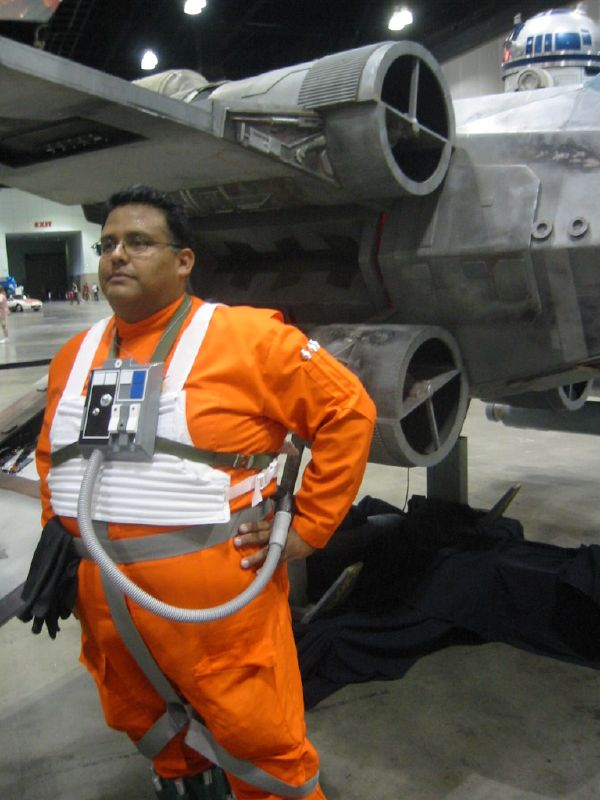
Cosplay of a Rebel Alliance pilot in front of Luke Skywalker's X-wing interceptor.

The Rebel forces include two squadrons: Gold Squadron, led by Jon "Dutch" Vander, composed of Y-wing bombers; and Red Squadron, led by Garven Dreis, composed of X-wing fighters. They are eventually supported by the Millennium Falcon, piloted by Han Solo and Chewbacca.

== Battle overview ==
When the Death Star arrives at Yavin, it must maneuver into position before it can target the Rebel base. This delay allows the Rebels to launch an assault. The station’s weakness lies in a small exhaust port that, if hit by a proton torpedo, will trigger a chain reaction. Red and Gold squadrons launch their attack. Luke Skywalker, designated "Red 5," joins the mission with R2-D2 as his astromech. TIE fighters intercept the assault, engaging Red Squadron while Gold Squadron attempts a trench run.

Gold Squadron is destroyed by Vader, prompting Red Squadron to take over. One by one, they are eliminated, leaving only Skywalker. As Vader closes in, the Millennium Falcon intervenes, damaging one TIE fighter and causing another to crash into Vader’s ship, sending him out of control. Guided by Obi-Wan Kenobi's voice, Luke uses the Force to fire a successful torpedo shot, destroying the Death Star moments before it can fire on Yavin.

== Review ==
The Battle of Yavin is a victory for the Rebel Alliance. The Death Star and nearly all of its personnel are destroyed. Darth Vader is the only known Imperial survivor, escaping in his damaged fighter.

Rebel losses are considerable. Aside from the Millennium Falcon, only three ships return from the original assault, including those piloted by Luke Skywalker and Wedge Antilles. Both squadron leaders are killed in action.

== Consequences ==
Following the battle, the Empire begins constructing a second, larger Death Star near Endor. With their Yavin 4 base compromised, the Rebels relocate to the ice planet Hoth in the Outer Rim. The second Death Star is later destroyed in a subsequent engagement.

== Concept and creation ==
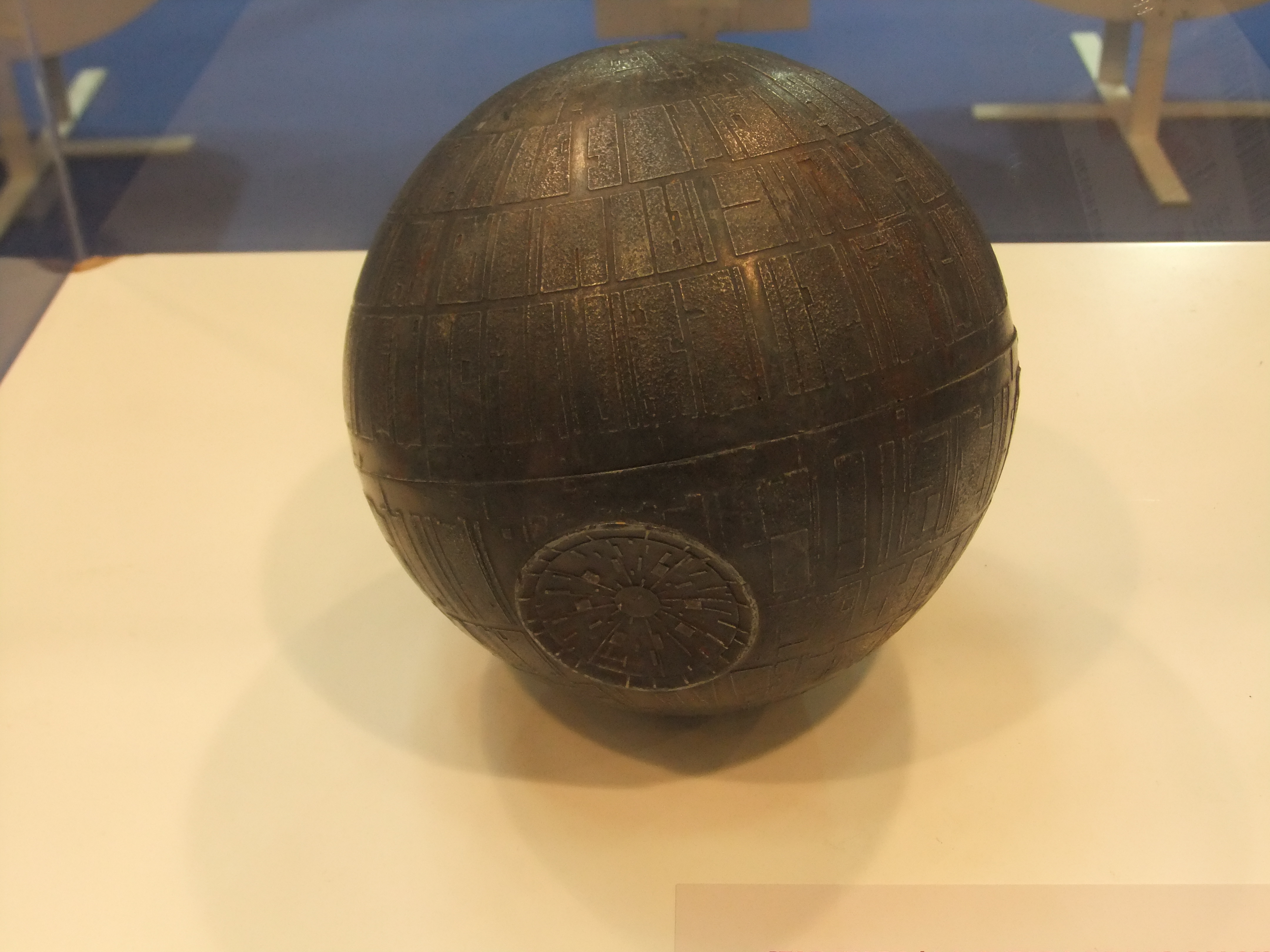
Model of the Death Star used for special effects in the film A New Hope.

Prior to filming A New Hope, George Lucas collaborated with model maker Colin Cantwell and artist Ralph McQuarrie. Cantwell designed early versions of the Y-wing and Millennium Falcon, while McQuarrie illustrated key scenes, including a Y-wing attack on the Death Star.

Only one full-scale X-wing was constructed, shown in the Yavin 4 hangar. Space battle scenes were created using practical effects. A single cockpit set was used, with actors rotating through it and droids swapped as needed.

In the 1997 and 2004 re-releases, several space battle scenes were enhanced with digital effects. These updates included additional rebel ships, improved explosions, and a shockwave added to the Death Star’s destruction.

== Adaptation ==
Beyond films, novels, and television, the Battle of Yavin appears in various Star Wars-related derivative works.

=== Video games ===
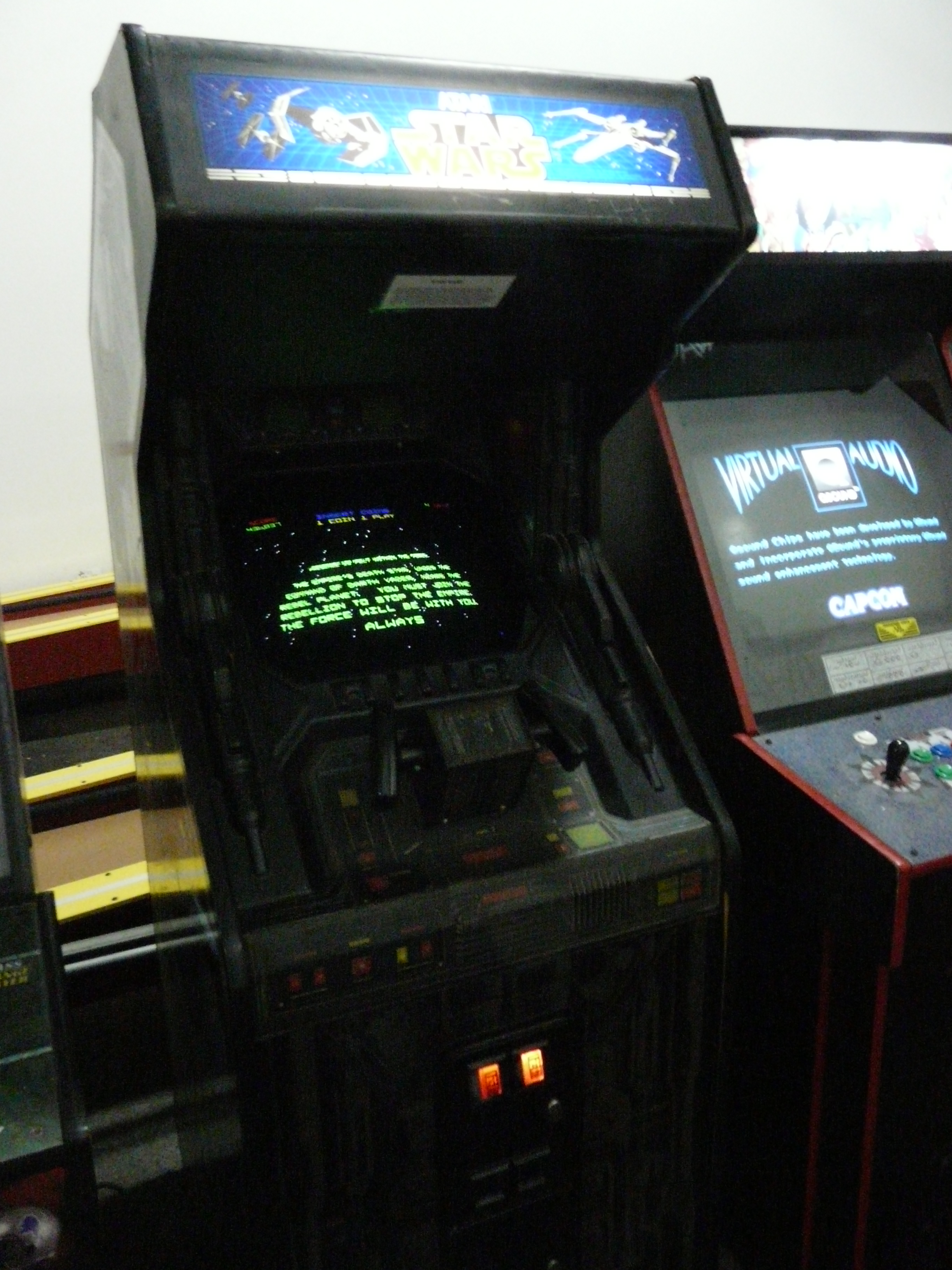
Star Wars arcade game vertical terminal.

The battle is featured in numerous video games. In Star Wars: Empire at War (2006), players can control either the Empire or the Rebel Alliance during the conflict around Yavin. Star Wars: X-Wing (1993) and Star Wars: Rogue Squadron (1998) allow players to assume the role of Luke Skywalker in missions involving the Death Star assault.

Its sequel, Star Wars: Rogue Squadron II - Rogue Leader (2002), opens with the trench run sequence. An alternate scenario with the player controlling Darth Vader and ending in an Imperial victory is also playable as a bonus level. The mobile game Star Wars: Trench Run (2009) simulates the trench battle from a pilot’s perspective.

The arcade game Star Wars (1983) includes scenes based on the surface of the Death Star.

=== Figurines ===
Numerous action figures depict characters from the battle., Hasbro released figures of Red Squadron and Imperial pilots in 2012, as well as earlier figures of Wedge Antilles, General Jan Dodonna, and Dutch Vander in 2004–2005.

LEGO released a Yavin 4 playset in 2012 (Set #9677), which includes a model of Luke Skywalker’s X-wing.

=== Amusement parks ===
A segment of the original Star Tours ride at Disney parks was inspired by the Battle of Yavin. Riders, aboard a Starspeeder 3000, join a Rebel assault on a third Death Star. This version of the ride existed at Disneyland and Walt Disney World (until 2010), Tokyo Disney Resort in Japan (until 2012), and Disneyland Paris in France (until 2016) before being replaced by Star Tours: The Adventures Continue.

== Reception ==
Screen Rant ranks the battle third among the original Star Wars trilogy, praising its visual effects and Han Solo’s intervention. In a separate list covering the entire saga, it places the battle first for its tension and pacing. PubSquare Media also ranks it first, while Looper ranks it fifth, citing its smaller scale compared to later battles.

== Posterity ==
=== In fan culture ===
Fan estimates of casualties aboard the Death Star vary, though figures often suggest approximately one million personnel were present at the time of its destruction. Online creators have reimagined the battle, including a video simulating the Death Star laser’s real-world appearance and a LEGO animation recreating the trench run with some liberties.

The battle is referenced in pop culture, notably in The Simpsons. In "My Sister, My Sitter" from Season 8, Bart hears a voice advising him like Obi-Wan. In "Pygmoelian" from Season 11, a line referencing Darth Vader is used. A comic from 1999 also parodies the scene with Santa’s Little Helper wearing Biggs Darklighter’s helmet.

=== Star Wars timeline reference point ===
The Battle of Yavin serves as the baseline for the Star Wars dating system, with years marked as BBY (Before the Battle of Yavin) and ABY (After the Battle of Yavin), using a 365-day year. For instance, the Battle of Geonosis occurs in 22 BBY, and the Battle of Jakku in 5 ABY.

However, Star Wars: The Rise of Skywalker: The Visual Guide (2019) adopts a different reference point—the Battle of Starkiller Base from The Force Awakens (2015).

== See also ==
- Star Wars
- List of Star Wars films
- List of Star Wars television series

== Bibliography ==
- Windham, Ryder; Wallace, Dan; Hidalgo, Pablo (2012). Générations "Star wars": la chronique illustrée de 30 ans d'aventures (Nouvelle éd ed.). Paris: Hors collection. ISBN 978-2-258-09895-4.
- Girod, Patrice (1999). L'Histoire: Toutes les grandes étapes du film, Lucasfilm Magazine: Le Guide officiel du film La Menace fantôme (1 ed.). automne.
- Kun, Exar (2014). "L'Univers Etendu abandonné au profit du Nouveau Canon". www.starwars-holonet.com (in French).
- Barr, Patricia; Bray, Adam; Wallace, Daniel; Windham, Ryder (2015). Ultimate "Star wars". Vanves: Hachette heroes. ISBN 978-2-01-220631-1.
- Hunt, James (2021-05-05). "Why Star Wars Keeps Bringing Back Saw Gerrera". ScreenRant.
- Leadbeater, Alex (2016-12-15). "Jyn and Galen Erso's Backstory Explained". ScreenRant.
- Nouet, Raphaël (2019a). Galen Erso- cinéSAGA (26 ed.).
- Hoover, Brett (2020-03-01). "Star Wars: 10 Things You Didn't Know About The Battle Of Scarif". ScreenRant.
- O'Callaghan, Lauren (2023). "Star Wars movies in order: Chronological and release". Space.com.
- Vaux, Robert (2021-07-11). "Star Wars: The Destruction of Scarif Is Even More Terrifying Than It Seems". CBR.
- Wallace, Daniel; Fry, Jason (2016). Star Wars: L'Atlas. Huginn & Muninn.
- Barr, Tricia; Bray, Adam; Horton, Cole (2017). "Star wars": l'encyclopédie visuelle. Vanves: Hachette heroes. ISBN 978-2-01-625499-8.
- Suinot, Thomas (2019). Jyn Erso- cinéSAGA (26 ed.).
- Burn, Jean-Baptiste (2019a). Etoile Noire- cinéSAGA (26 ed.).
- Nouet, Raphaël (2019b). Tantive IV- cinéSAGA (26 ed.).
- Miller, David (2021-09-02). "How Leia's Role In Stealing The Death Star Plans Is Worse In Star Wars Canon". ScreenRant.
- Sherlock, Ben (2019-06-04). "10 Greatest Battle Sequences In The Star Wars Saga". ScreenRant.
- Sherlock, Ben (2021-07-05). "Star Wars: 10 Ways The Death Star Trench Run Is The Saga's Greatest Space Battle". ScreenRant.
- Nouet, Raphaël (2019c). Yavin IV- cinéSAGA (26 ed.).
- Ghezal, Olivier (2021). "Star Wars : on connaît le nombre exact de décès attribués à Luke Skywalker sur l'Etoile Noire". hitek.fr.
- Tyler, Adrienne (2019a). "Star Wars: How Many People Died When The Death Star Was Destroyed". ScreenRant.
- Burn, Jean-Baptiste (2019b). Dark Vador- cinéSAGA (26 ed.).
- Nouet, Raphaël (2019d). Hoth-cinéSAGA (26 ed.).
- Becker, Edith; Burns, Kevin (2004-09-20), Empire of Dreams: The Story of the 'Star Wars' Trilogy (Documentary, History, Sci-Fi), Robert Clotworthy, Walter Cronkite, George Lucas, Prometheus Entertainment, Fox Television Studios, Lucasfilm
- Nouet, Raphaël (2019e). X-wing- cinéSAGA (26 ed.).
- Star Wars Universe (n.d.). "Un Nouvel Espoir - Les Évolutions de la Saga - La Saga - Les dossiers exclusifs SWU". Star Wars Universe (in French).
- GameSpy (n.d.). "Star Wars: Empire at War - PC - GameSpy". pc.gamespy.com.
- Retro Archives Fr (2018-06-27). "STAR WARS : X Wing". Retro Archives (in French).
- GameSpot (2012). "Star Wars: Rogue Squadron 3D". GameSpot. Archived from the original on 2013-08-19.
- IGN (2012). "Mission 1:Death Star Attack - Star Wars Rogue Squadron II Guide". IGN.
- Buchanan, Levi (2010-07-20). "Star Wars Trench Run Goes 2.0". IGN.
- "Now the force is with you! Star Wars". Computer and Video Games. 24: 30. 1983.
- Rebelscum (n.d.a). "Yavin Pilot Pack Movie Heroes by Hasbro". www.rebelscum.com.
- Rebelscum (n.d.b). "Wedge Antilles". www.rebelscum.com. Archived from the original on 2024-04-04.
- Rebelscum (n.d.c). "GENERAL JAN DODONNA (Battle of Yavin)". www.rebelscum.com.
- Rebelscum (n.d.d). "Dutch Vander: GOLD LEADER (Battle of Yavin)". www.rebelscum.com.
- Brickset (n.d.). "LEGO 9677 X-wing Starfighter & Yavin 4". Brickset.com.
- Brigante, Ricky (2011-05-03). "Geek Nostalgia: Looking back at the original Star Tours ride at Disney-MGM Studios". Inside the Magic.
- McFadden, James (2013). "Convenient Daily Departures: The History of Star Tours". Archived from the original on 2022-03-01.
- Daws, Jeremiah (2010-08-10). "Star Tours closing at Disneyland inspires happy memories from the past, concerns for the future". Inside the Magic.
- Tokyo Disney Resort (2011). "Star Tours to be Reintroduced in a New Version! Star Tours: The Adventures Continue" (PDF). Archived from the original (PDF) on 2011-11-25.
- Mihu, Florian (2016). "Retour sur la soirée de fermeture de Star Tours à Disneyland Paris". radiodisneyclub (in French).
- McGinley, Rhys (2021-05-01). "Star Wars: The 10 Best Original Trilogy Battles, Ranked". ScreenRant.
- Sim, Jonathan (2020-08-02). "Star Wars: The 10 Best Space Battles, Ranked". ScreenRant.
- Hall, Austin (2019-12-11). "The Nine Best "Star Wars" Battles". PubSquare Media.
- Jackson, Matthew (2020-01-08). "The Most Epic Star Wars Battles Ever". Looper.
- Tyler, Adrienne (2019b). "Star Wars: How Many People Died When The Death Star Was Destroyed". ScreenRant.
- Burnie, Brad (2020). "This Is Exactly How Many People Died On The Death Star". starships.com.
- Schwerdtfeger, Conner (2021-11-16). "Star Wars Video Reimagines Death Star Laser As Scientifically Accurate". ScreenRant.
- Keyes, Rob (2017-05-04). "Death Star Trench Run Remade With LEGO". ScreenRant.
- Wierny, Hari Michael; Meyers, Jason D. (n.d.). "The Simpsons Archive: Star Wars References". www.simpsonsarchive.com.
- Perry, Spencer (2019-12-03). "Lucasfilm Changed the Star Wars Timeline for The Rise of Skywalker". Star Wars.
- Armitage, Hugh; Sandwell, Ian (2021). "Where Ahsoka takes place on the Star Wars timeline, explained". Digital Spy.
- Grant, Nicholas (2021-02-20). "Star Wars Quietly Introduced ANOTHER New Dating System". CBR.
- Barton, Rebekah (2021). "'Star Wars' Quietly Retracted Aby & Bby in the Worst Possible Way". Inside the Magic.
- Dougherty, Kerrie; Fry, Jason; Hidalgo, Pablo; Reynolds, David West; Saxton, Curtis; Windham, Ryder (2020). "Star wars", encyclopédie illustrée des véhicules (Nouvelle éd ed.). Vanves: Hachette heroes. ISBN 978-2-01-945252-0.
