= Y-wing =

Fictional spacecraft from Star Wars

Koensayr BTL Y-wing starfighter
- Star Wars vehicle
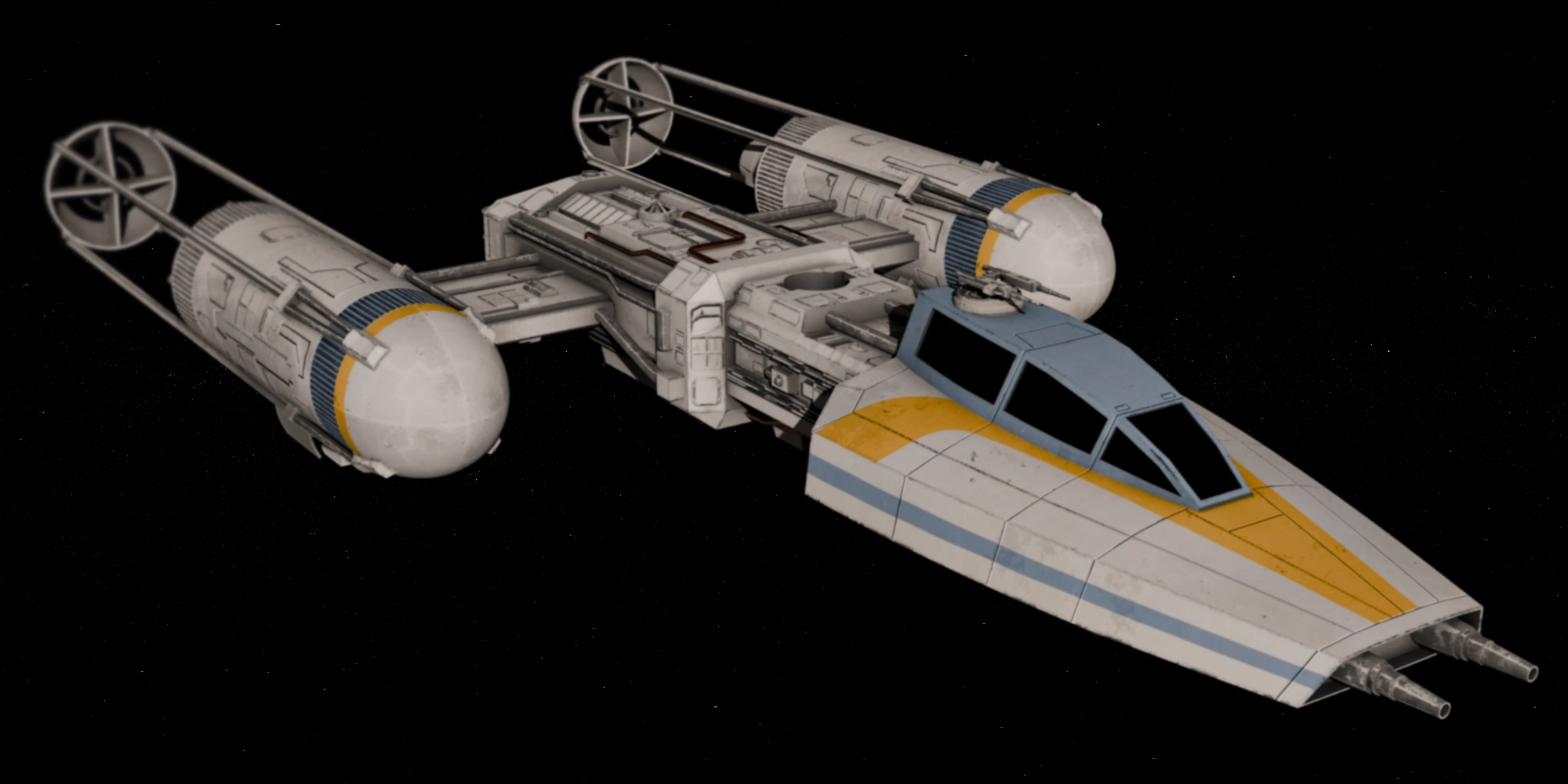
- First appearance: Star Wars: From the Adventures of Luke Skywalker (1976 novel); Star Wars (1977 film)
- Last appearance: The Mandalorian and Grogu
- Created by: Colin Cantwell

Information
- Affiliation: Galactic Republic; Rebel Alliance; New Republic; Resistance
- Launched: During or Prior to 22 BBY
- Auxiliary vehicles: Ejector seat

General characteristics
- Class: Assault starfighter/bomber
- Armaments: Laser cannons (2); Ion cannons (2); Proton Torpedo launchers (2); Original: 12 warheads total; Rebel-modified: 8 warheads total; New Republic: Optional
- Defenses: Deflector shield generator; Armored hull; Electronic countermeasures
- Maximum speed: BTL-A4; 2,700 G (maximum acceleration); 1,000 km/h (621 mph; maximum atmospheric speed); 70 MGLT (megalight per hour; subluminal speed); 1.0 HCR (hyperdrive class rating; superluminal speed); BTA-NR2; 2,750 G (maximum acceleration); 1,050 km/h (652 mph; maximum atmospheric speed); 80 MGLT (megalight per hour; subluminal speed); 1.0 HCF (hyperdrive class rating; superluminal speed)
- Propulsion: Ion engines (2); Class 1 hyperdrive motivator (1)
- Length: BTL-A4: 23.04 meters (75ft 7in); Rebel-modified: 16.24 meters (53ft 3in); BTA-NR2: 18.17 meters (59ft 7in)
- Width: BTL-A4: 8.54 meters (28ft); BTA-NR2: 8.78 meters (28ft 10in)
- Height: BTL-A4: 2.44 meters (8ft); BTA-NR2: 2.85 meters (9ft 4in)
- Population volume: 1 pilot; 1 gunner (optional); 1 astromech droid

The Koensayr series Y-wing assault starfighter/bomber are a series of fictional spacecraft from the Star Wars franchise. They are depicted as fighter-bombers of the Galactic Republic, Rebel Alliance, New Republic and the Resistance. Within the Star Wars setting, Y-wings are known for being ideally suited for anti-shipping, close air support, air interdiction, escort, force protection, and ground attack missions. Y-wings made their first theatrical appearance in Star Wars Episode IV: A New Hope and have featured in movies, television shows, and the Star Wars expanded universe's books, comics, and games.

== Origin and design ==
Colin Cantwell, who also designed the saga's TIE fighters, initially designed the Y-wing with a large bubble turret for a gunner. However, the dome did not appear properly when filmed against bluescreen and subsequent designs omitted the turret. According to Colin Cantwell's estate, he was directly inspired by the Grumman TBF Avenger when designing the Y-wing, borrowing elements such as the turret gunner seated behind the pilot.

== Depiction ==
Reference material states the Galactic Republic commissioned Koensayr Manufacturing to produce the original version of the Y-wing, the BTL-B model, during the early part of the Clone Wars. This Y-wing model made its first television appearance in The Clone Wars 2008 series leading an attack on the Separatist warship Malevolence. It features heavy armor plating encasing a forward module which connects to two powerful ion engines. The module seats a pilot in the cockpit and a gunner in the bubble turret. An astromech droid (which serves as the fighter's navigation system) fits into a dedicated socket behind them. The module also carries the starfighter's armaments, including a pair of torpedo launchers capable of launching bombs, cluster missiles and other ordnance. With the success of the BTL-B, the Republic commissions Koensayr to produce variants that replace the bubble turret with a remote-controlled turret: the BTL-S3 seats the gunner behind the pilot in the cockpit and the BTL-A4 removes the gunner and gives the pilot control of the ion cannons.

Y-wings are prized for their durability and long-range striking capability during the Clone Wars but afterwards are decommissioned by the Galactic Empire and relegated to military surplus sellers or scrapyards. The nascent Rebel Alliance seeks to buy or commandeer as many Y-wings as possible to build out its forces. In the Star Wars Rebels 2014 animated series, the crew of the Ghost are shown stealing decommissioned Old Republic original BTL Y-wings, in the process of being dismantled by the Galactic Empire, for use by the Rebellion. Once acquired, technicians modify the fighter-bombers to make them more suitable to the Rebellion's hit-and-run tactics. These changes include removing the bubble turret from the original Y-wing model and replacing it with the remote-controlled turret. The resulting modifications make these Rebel Y-wings faster and more lethal than their original version and they become the most readily available starfighters to the Rebellion during the Galactic Civil War.

Y-wings make a theatrical appearance in Rogue One (2016), an anthology film set immediately prior to the events of the original Star Wars film. Here the Y-wings of Gold Squadron are shown playing a pivotal role during the Battle of Scarif in disabling an Imperial Star Destroyer with ion torpedoes. The same Gold Squadron features in the original Star Wars movie (1977) as they take part in the attack on the Death Star. Led by squadron leader Jon Vander (Angus MacInnes), Y-wings make the first unsuccessful "trench run" on the Death Star's exhaust port, and only one Y-wing survives the battle itself. (The pilot of the surviving Y-Wing was identified in Star Wars Legends sources as Keyan Farlander but was later revised to be Evaan Verlaine following the acquisition by Disney). Luke Skywalker pilots a Y-wing in the animated segment of the 1978 Star Wars Holiday Special. Y-wings make a brief appearance at the end of The Empire Strikes Back (1980) when the heroes are reunited with the Rebel fleet, and feature alongside other Rebel starfighters during the climactic space battle of Return of the Jedi (1983).

After the Empire is defeated, Koensayr introduces a new version of the Y-wing to capitalize on the fighter's popularity. The BTA-NR2 model features various upgrades but emulates the look of the Rebel-modified Y-wings. This is because the public is more familiar with this version and because it allows for greater customization. These versions of the Y-wing appear during the climax of Star Wars: The Rise of Skywalker (2019) as the Resistance attempts to defeat the reborn Emperor Palpatine.

== Analysis ==
In 2018, various Star Wars starfighters had their aerodynamic abilities tested using the Autodesk Flow Design virtual wind tunnel program. Of those tested, the Y-wing had a drag coefficient of .68, which, while worse than the real-life example of the F-4E Phantom with a rating of .02, was better than that of most TIE Fighters tested. These poor results were rationalized with the in-universe explanations that drag coefficient plays no role in space travel and that Star Wars fighters can use repulsorlifts and deflector shields to give themselves better flight profiles.

== Cultural impact ==
Ken Napzok in Why We Love Star Wars: The Great Moments That Built a Galaxy Far, Far Away argues the Y-wing is the true workhorse of the Rebellion but gets unfairly overshadowed by the classic X-wing and other starfighters. Admitting it is a slower and bulkier design, he nevertheless points out the critical role it plays in the Rogue One movie proves its worth as a vital Rebel asset for softening Imperial defenses. He also highlights a larger point that such fun and often silly debates about little details in the Star Wars saga are what attract many fans to the series.

Writing for the Smithsonian, Cory Graff contrasts the Y-wing and X-wing working together with another complimentary pair: the Supermarine Spitfire and Hawker Hurricane during the Battle of Britain. He states the X-wing's popularity "is not unlike the preference wartime magazine photographers showed toward the stunning Spitfire fighter, while the workhorse Hurricane was all but ignored. Lucas’ war-wagon Y-wing received similar treatment." The in-universe explanation for how the Y-wing was stripped down to make it faster mirrors how many fighters of the time were similarly converted for reconnaissance duties. He also draws parallels between the design of the Y-wing and another fighter, the Lockheed P-38 Lightning, with both featuring centrally-located cockpits and twin booms.

In July 2024, a miniature of the Y-wing, used in the filming of the original Star Wars movie and identified as the model flown by Gold Leader, was sold at auction for $1.55 million USD. It was one of only two "hero" miniatures that were created for filming close-up shots. The auction was held by Heritage Auctions, which began the bidding at $300,000.

Lego has released multiple Y-wing sets starting with their first one in 1999, which was part of a combo pack along with a TIE Fighter. Two of these were part of the Ultimate Collector Series (UCS), one in 2004 and again in 2018, which have high piece counts and meticulous detailing. The second UCS Y-wing set consisted of 1,967 pieces and when fully constructed measured 2 inches high by 24 inches long and 11 inches wide. It also came with a display stand and sold at retail for $199.99 USD.

== See also ==
- List of Star Wars spacecraft
