= Geonosis =

Desert planet of Star Wars

- Star Wars location
- First appearance: Star Wars: Attack of the Clones (2002)
- Genre: Desert planet

In-universe information
- Other names: Geonosia, Genosha
- Races: Geonosians, Acklays, Nexus, Reeks
- Affiliations: Confederacy of Independent Systems; Galactic Empire
- Oceans: 0
- Terrain: Desert; Mountain
- Standard Galactic Grid Coordinates: R-17

Geonosis is a desert planet in the fictional universe of Star Wars. Located in the Outer Rim, it orbits the star Ea. The Clone Wars, a major feature of the Star Wars universe, began when the Galactic Republic invaded Geonosis, then in the hands of the Separatist Confederacy of Independent Systems.

Although entirely covered by a red desert, Geonosis is the home planet of the Geonosians. They are renowned for the quality of the combat droids they produce and supply to the Confederacy of Independent Systems, of which they are a founding member.

It appears in just one Star Wars film, Episode II – Attack of the Clones. Scenes set on the planet are created using inlays and digital special effects. The planet's landscapes are inspired by the American West.

In addition to the films, Geonosis is featured in the TV series The Clone Wars, Rebels, The Book of Boba Fett, in the novelizations of the film in which it appears, as well as in several novels, video games, and comic books.

== Background ==
The Star Wars universe is set in a galaxy that is the scene of clashes between the Jedi Knights and the Dark Lords of the Sith, people who are sensitive to the Force, a mysterious energy field that gives them psychic powers. The Jedi master the light side of the Force, a beneficial and defensive power, to maintain peace in the galaxy. The Sith use the Dark Side, a harmful and destructive power, for their own purposes and to dominate the galaxy.

== Geography ==
=== Location and topography ===
Orbiting the star Ea, Geonosis is one of six planets in the system that bears its name. The Geonosis system is part of the Arkanis sector, itself located in the Outer Rim. Although a telluric planet, it is surrounded by a ring of asteroids.

The surface of Geonosis is covered with rocky desert plains and mountains. Its sky, like the ground, is red.

=== Life forms ===
Several animal species live on Geonosis, including the aggressive massiffs and the sturdy orrays. The former serves as pets, the latter as mounts; before domesticated, the orrays hunted Geonosian eggs extensively. Parasitic invertebrates such as phidna and brain worm also exist. Phidna excrement is collected and mixed with pulverized rock to form rock paste, the main material used in Geonosian construction. The brain worm can enter a person's nose and then control their brain. In addition, many species living on Geonosis are bioluminescent.

One intelligent species is native to Geonosis: the Geonosian. They are winged insectoids that live in hives. Their society is divided into castes: queens, warriors, and workers. There is one queen per hive, who lays the eggs. Warriors protect the queen and the hive, sometimes waging war on other hives. Workers are the backbone of Geonosian society, building the various structures required for their hive.

=== Housing and technology ===
Geonosians live in queen-led hives. The hives imitate the contours of the natural landscape, to blend in with the surroundings and protect their inhabitants from rival hives and other external dangers. The planet's most important hive is the Stalgasin Hive, which has signed arms agreements with the Trade Federation. The Geonosians are major producers of battle droids. They have huge, fully automated factories that mass-produce droids.

Geonosian society practises the death penalty and does not hesitate to put it on show in arenas. Those condemned to death who receive the most attention are put face-to-face with creatures alien to Geonosis. The largest of these is the Petranaki Arena, where Jedi Obi-Wan Kenobi, Anakin Skywalker, and Senator Padmé Amidala must battle an acklay, a nexu, and a reek.

== Official universe ==
=== Before the Clone Wars ===
Several decades before the Battle of Yavin, the Geonosians of the Stalgasin Hive and the Trade Federation reached an agreement to supply the latter with battle droids. The droids proved their worth during the Battle of Naboo, when they faced down an army of Gungans.

A few years later, Geonosis joined the Confederacy of Independent Systems, and its leader, Archduke Poggle the Lesser, pledged to supply it with a full army of battle droids. The Geonosians also took part in the development of a new weapon capable of destroying planets: the Death Star.

=== Clone Wars ===
==== First Battle of Geonosis ====
In 22 BC, Jedi Knight Obi-Wan Kenobi travels to Geonosis to track down bounty hunter Jango Fett. He discovers the extent of the Separatist installations and informs his apprentice Anakin Skywalker and the Jedi Council. However, he is discovered and captured by the Geonosians, who hand him over to a Sith lord, Count Dooku, who explains that the Galactic Republic is already under Sith's control. Anakin and Padmé Amidala are on Tatooine, a planet close to Geonosis, when Obi-Wan warns them. They decide to go to his rescue and free him. Once on the planet, they explore a droid factory, but are also captured. All three are sentenced to death. The execution is to take the form of a battle against an acklay, a nexu and a reek at the Petranaki Arena.

The battle and war begin when a group of two hundred Jedi led by Mace Windu infiltrate the arena to rescue the three captives. On arrival, Mace Windu attempts to confront Dooku but is intercepted by Jango Fett, whom he then kills. The Jedi have to contend with an army of droids who have taken over the battle area. The Jedi are quickly supported by clone troopers led by Jedi Master Yoda. The battle spreads across the desert plains beyond the arena, as Count Dooku duels Obi-Wan and Anakin, then Yoda. Overwhelmed, the Separatists decide to evacuate the planet, accepting defeat in the hope of retaking Geonosis from the Galactic Republic.

==== Second Battle of Geonosis ====
As the war intensifies, the Republic is forced to spread its troops across the galaxy, reducing the number of troops on Geonosis. The Separatists took advantage of the situation to recapture the planet and relaunch the battle droid production factories. The Jedi Ki-Adi-Mundi, Anakin Skywalker, and Ahsoka Tano, at the head of an armada, land on Geonosis and start fighting. One of the most important battles of the Clone Wars begins. The Jedi succeeded in achieving their objectives: destroying the factories - a task taken on by Anakin Skywalker's Jedi apprentice Ahsoka Tano and Luminara Unduli's Jedi apprentice Barriss Offee - and capturing Poggle the Brief, after a chase through the planet's underground network. From then on, the Republic strengthened its presence on the planet so as not to lose it again.

During the battle, Geonosians also used parasites to resurrect dead Geonosians as zombies. On a Galactic Republic ship, clones and even a Jedi, Barriss Offee, who had come to fight during the battle with her Master Luminara Unduli, are quickly infected by the parasite, leaving Ahsoka Tano to face her colleagues who have turned against her. In the end, she succeeded in stopping the epidemic. This battle also forged a friendship between Barriss Offee and Ahsoka Tano.

This Republican victory forced the CSI to build new droid factories on other planets to supply its army. With Poggle the Short captured, the Galactic Republic secretly embarked on a project to build a space combat station, the Death Star. Director Orson Krennic oversees the construction project.

=== Imperial era ===
Following the defeat of the Separatists and the advent of the Galactic Empire, Geonosians are reduced to slavery. They continue to participate in the construction of the Death Star orbiting Geonosis. This work is supervised by Imperial Moff Wilhuff Tarkin, secretly sent by the Emperor on this highly important mission. Afterwards, however, they are all exterminated by the Imperials. By sparing them, the Empire risked divulging the secret of the Death Star.

One Geonosian, Klik-Klak, surprisingly survives the genocide. He attempts to reveal the existence of the Death Star to Saw Gerrera and the rebels on the planet Lothal, drawing on the ground of the space station, in vain, as he is not understood.

== Legends Universe ==
Following the takeover of Lucasfilm by The Walt Disney Company, all elements told in derivative products dating from before April 26, 2014, were declared to be outside the canon and were then grouped together as Star Wars Legends.

=== Before the Empire ===
Geonosis was discovered around 4,000 BC by miners from Tatooine. Fascinated by the technologies of these explorers, the Geonosians assimilated them and began manufacturing droids.

The following millennia were marked by wars between hives. As a result, the planet became isolated from the rest of the Galaxy. It wasn't until the century before the Battle of Yavin and the agreement signed between the Hives and the Baktoid Armor Workshop, an arms manufacturer, that Geonosis regained a certain interest.

=== Under the Empire and beyond ===
After the Clone Wars, the Galactic Empire nationalized droid production on Geonosis. Geonosian engineers continued to participate in the construction of the Death Star and other Imperial projects.

After the defeat of the Empire, the planet continued to manufacture droids, but its production was monitored by the New Republic.

== Concept and creation ==
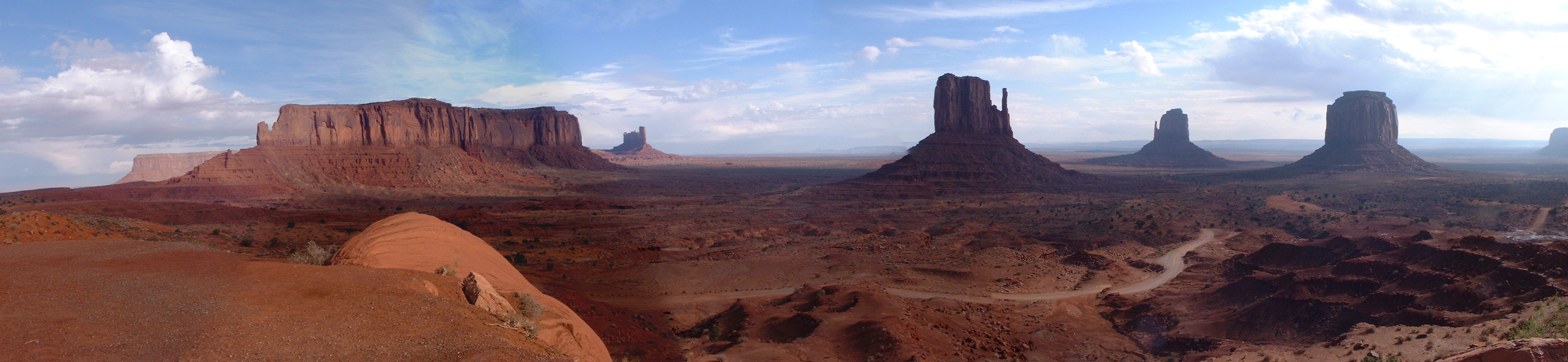
The landscapes of the American West, as seen here in Monument Valley, inspired those of Geonosis.

The planet's name seems to derive from “geognosis”, which etymologically means “knowledge of the earth” in ancient Greek. The name mainly refers to the Geonosians, who possess enough knowledge of architecture to design another earth, the Death Star.

Most scenes set on Geonosis are created using digital special effects. Actors are filmed in front of a blue background, then inlayed onto the set. The planet's desert landscapes are inspired by those seen in the American West.

== Adaptations ==
In addition to its official appearances in novels, novelizations, films and TV series, Geonosis also appears in other Star Wars spin-offs.

=== Video games ===
Geonosis appears in the 2005 game Star Wars: Battlefront II. Indeed, the battle of Geonosis is one of those in which the player can take part. This is the planet on which the tutorial at the start of the game takes place. The presence of this planet in the 2017 remake, also entitled Star Wars: Battlefront II, is often highlighted, along with elements linked to its introduction on November 28, 2020, such as the RT-TT, Obi-Wan Kenobi in Clone Wars general garb, a General Grievous theme added, and even, some time later, Count Dooku.

In addition, like several planets in the saga, the desert of Geonosis is a terrain where the player can venture in the 2022 video game Lego Star Wars: The Skywalker Saga.

=== Figures ===
Lego produced three boxes depicting the two battles of Geonosis, including the fight between Yoda and Count Dooku, released in 2013 as number 75017 “Duel on Geonosis”, a group of clone troopers, released in 2015 as 75089 “Geonosis Troopers”, and the Jedi Luminara Unduliaccompanied by Captain Rex in a battle against droids, released in 2011 as 7869 “Battle for Geonosis”. In addition, at Legoland California, miniature reproductions of the arena and battles on the desert plains can be seen in the Star Wars miniland.

=== Theme parks ===
The planet appears in Star Tours: The Adventures Continue, a renovated version of Star Tours. Visitors board a Starspeeder 1000, an intergalactic transport ship, which finds itself pursued by the Empire or the First Order because a Rebel spy is on board. During its journey, the ship visits two planets, one of which may be Geonosis, in which case the visitor is chased by Boba Fett through the asteroid ring surrounding the planet. This attraction is located at Disneyland Resort and Walt Disney World Resort in the US, at Tokyo Disney Resort in Japan since 2013, and at Disneyland Paris in France since 2017.

== Reception ==
Nate Jones of Vulture places Geonosis in twenty-ninth position in a ranking of which Star Wars planets he would find most appealing to live on. Jones praised the planet for its thriving industrial economy and innovative arena designs, but criticized for being inhabited by the Geonosians, whom he regarded as "wretched bug creatures". In a similar ranking, Screen Rant's Brian Walton identifies Geonosis as the series' thirteenth most important planet, due to its role as the planet where battle droids and the Death Star are built.

In another ranking, Screen Rant considers the battle of Geonosis to be the sixth best Star Wars movie ending battle. In another ranking, season 2 of The Clone Wars is considered superior in quality to season 1, thanks in particular to the arc of the second battle of Geonosis. Indeed, in yet another ranking, the arc of the second battle of Geonosis is considered the best of The Clone Wars season 2.

Thomas Imbert of AlloCiné considers the execution scene in the Geonosis arena to be the best in Attack of the Clones, comparing it to a similar scene from the 1951 film Quo Vadis.

The concept of brainworms in Geonosis, presented in The Clone Wars arc on the Second Battle of Geonosis, is also sometimes seen as bringing a more horror-like dimension to Star Wars, by introducing a kind of zombie.

== Analysis ==
Like many Star Wars planets, Geonosis is analyzed by scientists to determine whether the concept can exist in reality. Thus, for Geonosis, the main focus is on the rings that surround the planet (although it is telluric) and are, according to Attack of the Clones, an asteroid field. However, these asteroids are too close together to avoid collisions, which would have reduced them to much smaller particles. In reality, therefore, these rings must not be composed of stones but of dust, which makes the scene that takes place there in the film completely impossible. As for the planet itself, like several other worlds in the saga, it is a desert, modeled on Tatooine. In particular, it bears a strong resemblance to a real planet, Mars, which allows it to be assimilated to reality, in addition to its similarities with the landscape of the Grand Canyon. What's more, a planet of this geography would paradoxically be more hospitable, with water causing several climatic upheavals. Finally, this type of planet is very common in the real Universe.

== See also ==
- List of Star Wars planets and moons

== Bibliography ==
- Pallant, Katrina; Clubb, Nathalie (2019). Star Wars : Alien archive. Hachette Heroes. ISBN 978-2-01-709542-2.
- Wallace, Daniel; Fry, Jason (2016). Star Wars : L'Atlas. Huginn & Muninn. ISBN 978-2-36480-397-8.
- Barr, Patricia; Bray, Adam; Wallace, Daniel; Windham, Ryder (2015). Ultimate Star Wars. Hachette Livre. ISBN 978-2-01-220631-1.
- Reynolds, David (2002). Star Wars : tout sur "L'attaque des clones" : personnages, créatures, droïdes (in French). Nathan. ISBN 2-09-240471-7.
- Windham, Ryder (2012). Star Wars, l'encyclopédie absolue - Nouvelle édition (in French). Nathan. ISBN 978-2-0925-4065-7.
- Beecroft, Simon (2003). Star Wars, Épisode II, L'attaque des clones : Les lieux de l'action (in French). Nathan. ISBN 978-2-09-240483-6.
