= Colin Cantwell =

American film concept artist and director (1932–2022)

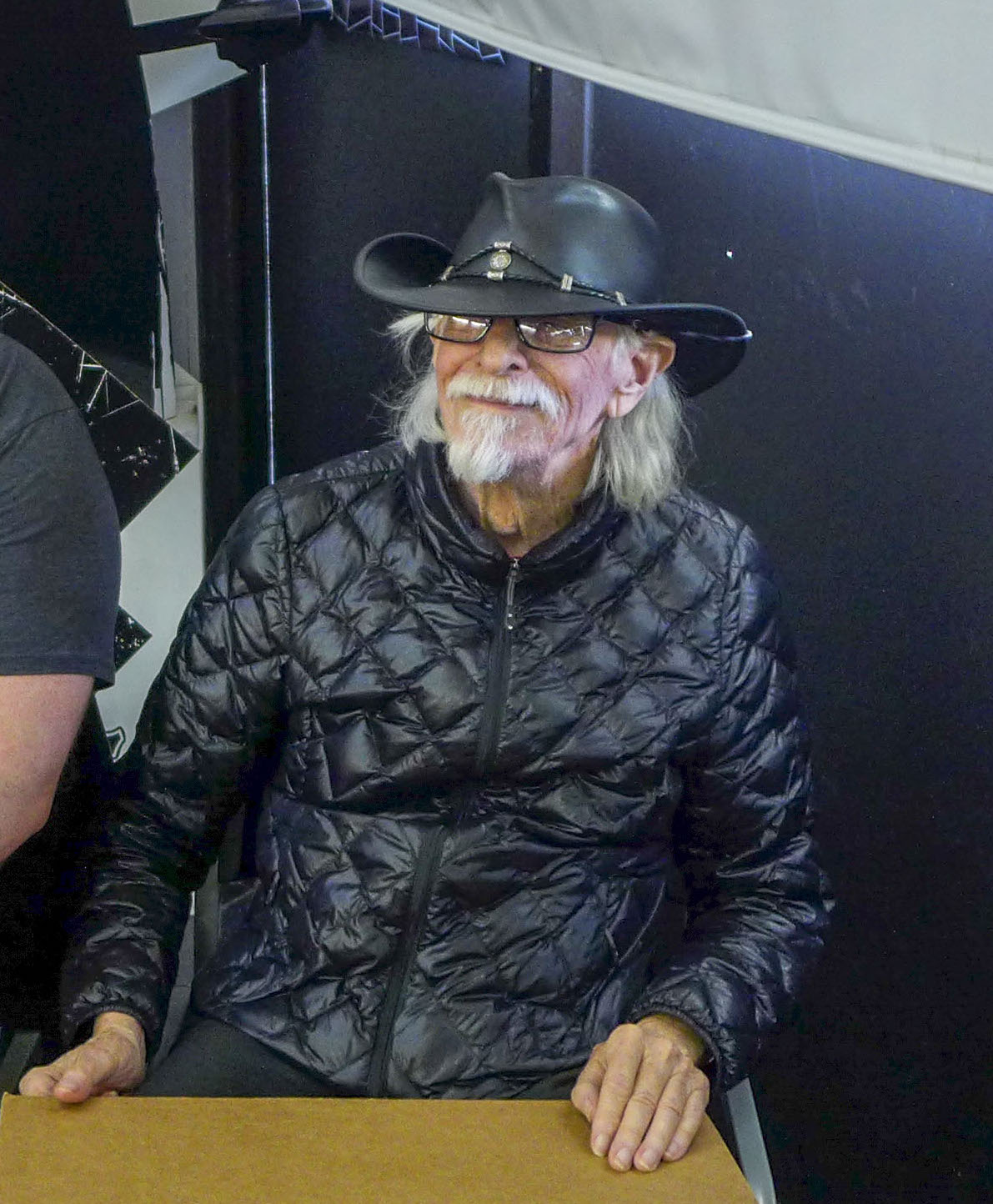
- Colin Cantwell at a signing event in TATE’S Comics in Lauderhill, Florida on March 17, 2019
- Born: April 3, 1932; San Francisco, California, U.S.
- Died: May 21, 2022 (aged 90); Colorado Springs, Colorado, U.S.
- Education: University of California, Los Angeles
- Occupation: Artist
- Partner: Sierra Dall
- Relatives: Robert Cantwell (uncle)
- Website: colincantwell.com

Colin James Cantwell (April 3, 1932 – May 21, 2022) was an American concept artist and director known for his work on films like 2001: A Space Odyssey, Close Encounters of the Third Kind and WarGames, as well as the TV series Buck Rogers in the 25th Century, but primarily for doing creating concept designs and models for a number of Star Wars vehicles, most notably the X-wing fighter, the TIE fighter, the Star Destroyer, the Y-Wing Fighter.

== Career ==
=== Early work ===
While working on visual effects for 2001: A Space Odyssey with Douglas Trumbull, Cantwell persuaded Stanley Kubrick "'not to start the movie with a 20-minute conference table discussion.' It was Cantwell who created the dramatic space opening that followed the dawn of man and bone thrown into the air", and who suggested the use of Also sprach Zarathustra for the opening theme music.

While employed by NASA, Cantwell was in the CBS News studio for the Apollo 11 Moon landing, assisting Walter Cronkite as he narrated the landing.

In the early seventies, Cantwell was employed by the Reuben H. Fleet Science Center to produce effects for, and direct, an early multimedia presentation titled Voyage to the Outer Planets (1973) that would show a spacecraft touring the outer planets of the Solar System.

=== Star Wars ===
In 1974, Cantwell was hired by director George Lucas and producer Gary Kurtz to work on the original Star Wars film. Based on Lucas' directions, he created the original designs and concept models for a number of vehicles, including the X-wing fighter, the Y-wing, the TIE fighter, the Star Destroyer, the Death Star, the Tantive IV (which was originally intended to be the Millennium Falcon), the landspeeder and the sandcrawler.

Cantwell's original designs were further developed by concept artists like Ralph McQuarrie and Joe Johnston. One of Cantwell's concept models was used in the film, with Luke Skywalker playing with it as he talks to C-3PO.

One of Cantwell's original Star Destroyer designs was further developed for the 2018 Solo: A Star Wars Story as the Cantwell-class Arrestor Cruiser, but was ultimately unused, although Hot Wheels did release a toy version. Industrial Light and Magic paid tribute to Cantwell when it introduced the Cantwell-Class in the first season of Andor, during episode 11, "Daughter of Ferrix".

=== Later work ===
Cantwell consulted with Hewlett-Packard on the development of their Hewlett-Packard 9845C desktop computers which were designed for graphical tasks, also creating a demo package to show off its capabilities. He then used HP 9845C desktop computers to design and create the computer graphics for the large displays in the NORAD set on the 1983 WarGames film.

In 2014, a number of items were auctioned from Cantwell's collection for a total of $118,732.50.

Cantwell wrote a science fiction novel, CoreFires, and a sequel, CoreFires2; they were published in 2016 and 2018, respectively.

== Personal life ==
Colin James Cantwell was born on April 3, 1932, in San Francisco. He earned a bachelor's degree in applied arts from the University of California, Los Angeles in 1957.

One of his uncles, Robert Cantwell, was a critic and author.

Cantwell died at his home in Colorado Springs, Colorado on May 21, 2022, aged 90. His partner, Sierra Dall, had reported that Cantwell had been afflicted with Alzheimer's disease in the final years of his life.

== Awards ==
In 1984, Cantwell was nominated at the 37th British Academy Film Awards for Best Special Visual Effects for his work on WarGames. Return of the Jedi won the award.
