= X-wing fighter =

Fictional fighter craft

X-wing starfighter
- Star Wars vehicle
- Rebel X-wings from Red Squadron in Star Wars (1997 Special Edition). Gold Squadron Y-wings are visible at the center right.
- First appearance: Star Wars: From the Adventures of Luke Skywalker; 1976 novelization
- Created by: Colin Cantwell

Information
- Affiliation: Rebel Alliance; Partisans; New Republic; Resistance
- Made by: Incom Corporation; Incom-FreiTek Corporation

General characteristics
- Class: Space superiority fighter
- Armaments: 4 laser cannons; 2 proton torpedo launchers
- Defenses: Deflector shields; Titanium armor alloy; Sensor jammer
- Maximum speed: 3,700 G (maximum acceleration); 1,050 km/h (652 mph; maximum atmospheric speed); 100 MGLT (megalight per hour; subluminal speed); 1.0 HCR (hyperdrive class rating; superluminal speed)
- Propulsion: 4 hyperdrive motivators; 4 fusial thrust engines
- Power: Cryogenic power generator
- Mass: 10 metric tons (T-65B)
- Length: 13.4 meters (T-65B); 12.48 (T-70)
- Width: 11.76 meters (38 ft 7 in)
- Height: 2.4 meters (8 ft 1 in)
- Population volume: 1 pilot; 1 astromech droid

The X-wing starfighter is the general name for a series of fictional spacecraft in the Star Wars franchise. Named for the distinctive shape made when its "s-foil" wings are in attack position, the X-wing was first used by the Rebel Alliance and later the New Republic in their conflict with the Galactic Empire. It made its theatrical debut in Star Wars (1977) where Luke Skywalker flies one in the climactic battle to destroy the Death Star. A new X-wing model is introduced in The Force Awakens (2015) as a vessel flown by Resistance pilots like Poe Dameron against the First Order and Sith Eternal. Other X-wing models appear throughout various Star Wars television shows, games, books, and other media. X-wing replicas and toys, as well as an eponymous flight simulator game, have been produced and sold by many companies.

== Production ==
=== Origin and design ===
Colin Cantwell sketched and built models that eventually became the final X-wing fighter in Star Wars. The X-wings were designed to appear more "traditional" than the Empire's TIE fighters. Industrial Light & Magic (ILM) built miniatures in various scales, with wing markings indicating which prop represented which pilot. When ILM fell behind on generating X-wing footage, Star Wars creator/director George Lucas and his editors temporarily used World War II dogfight footage for initial editing cuts. Each X-wing model was built around a hollow core made from surgical tubing, which allowed lighting, cooling, and electrical connectors for the wing motors to be installed and maintained. The cockpit windows were made from faceted glass so accurate reflections could be filmed. Although the movie's initial script and novelization describe the X-wings as belonging to "Blue squadron", limitations in bluescreen photography led to the markings on the filming models, as well as the fictional squadron affiliation being changed to red.

In addition to miniatures, special effects expert John Stears and his crew made a single, full-size X-wing for scenes in the Rebels' Yavin 4 base hangar; combined with cardboard cutouts and careful editing, the Rebels appear to have dozens of fighters. The production crew also made a full-size X-wing cockpit that was used for all actors; the astromech droid visible behind each actor was changed for each starfighter. Background noise pitch and tone also varied between X-wings to further differentiate the characters piloting them.

==== Subsequent films ====
The "lake" in which Luke Skywalker (Mark Hamill) crashes his X-wing in The Empire Strikes Back (1980) was only 3.5 feet (1.1 m) deep, requiring the creation of a rig resembling the starfighter sitting in the water at an angle. The rig was built in hinged sections so it could be manipulated to sink or rise, a key feature for the scene when Luke fails to levitate his ship from the water.

In 1993, ILM visual effects specialist John Knoll created a proof of concept test of dogfighting X-wings and TIE fighters to demonstrate the feasibility of using commercially available desktop computer software for simple animation work. This resulted in numerous parts of space battle scenes being "re-shot" as digital animations for the original trilogy's Special Edition releases.

The ARC-170 starfighter seen in Revenge of the Sith (2005) is the ancestor of the X-wing and is deliberately reminiscent of the X-wing's design.

When supervising effects for Rogue One (2016), Knoll discovered that the original X-wing cockpit set did not match the cockpit's arrangement on the shooting models. This required the effects team to rotoscope archival footage of Star Wars X-wing pilots onto digital cockpits created for the film. ILM designers incorporated X-wing engines into the design of the contemporaneous U-wing created for Rogue One.

The Force Awakens art director Gary Tomkins said ships and tools would be expected to evolve technologically in the time between Return of the Jedi and The Force Awakens. Using the X-wing as an example, he said the sequel film's version was "a little bit slicker [and] smoother".

== Depiction ==
X-wings with their s-foils locked in attack position as they assault the Death Star in Star Wars (1997 Special Edition)

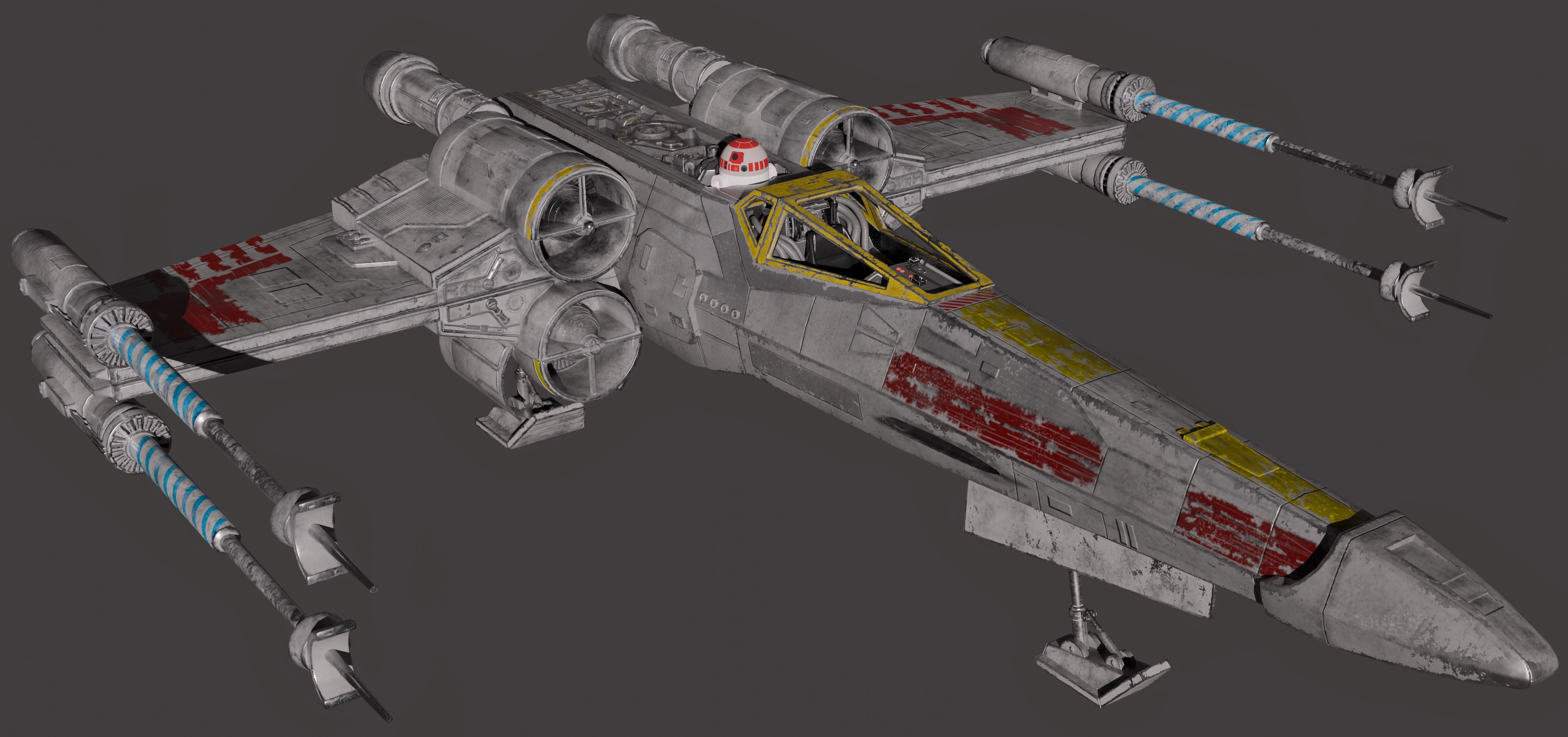
An X-wing with its s-foils closed

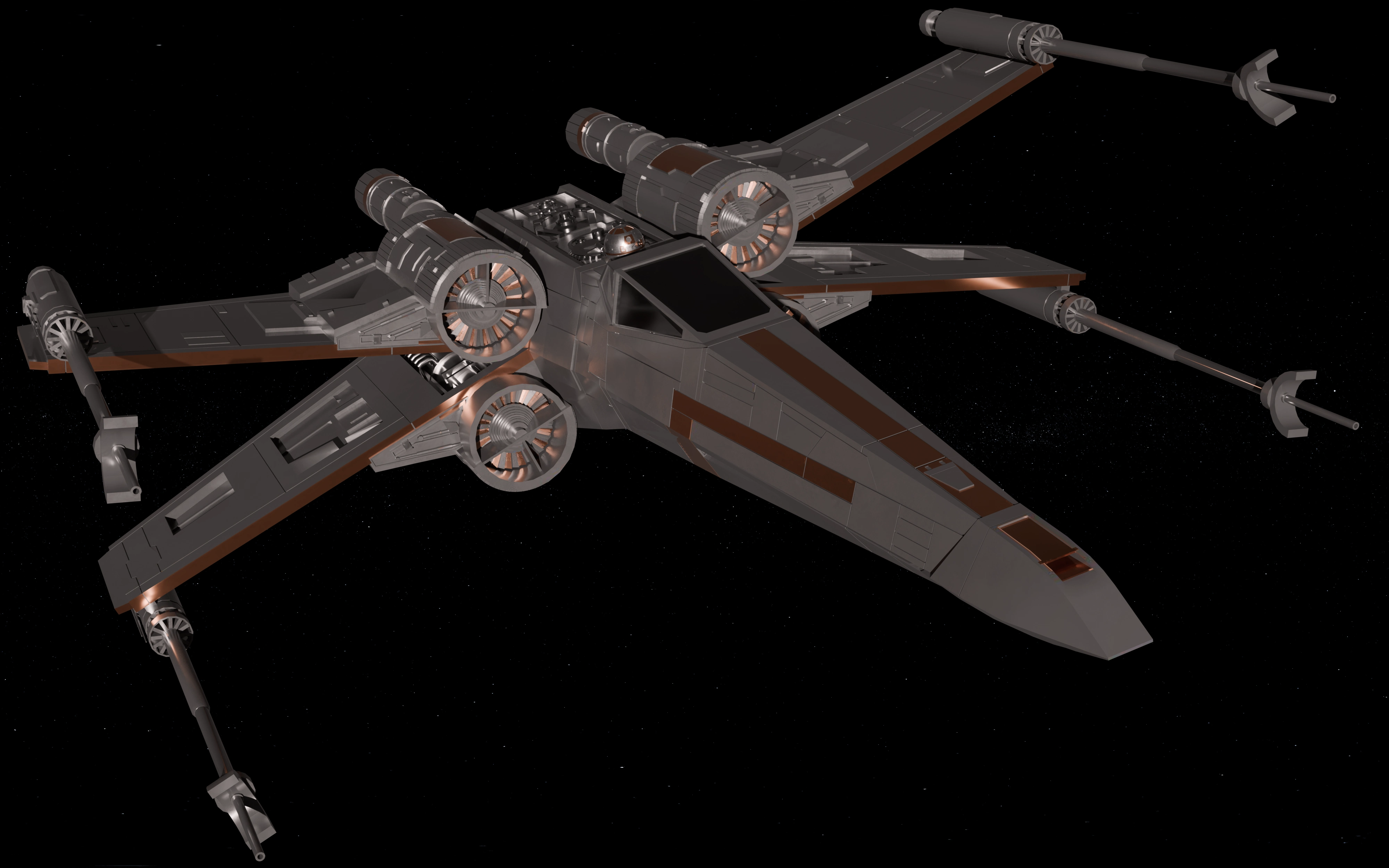
An X-wing with its s-foils in their X-shaped attack position

The T-65B X-wing is produced by the Incom Corporation, which had previously supplied the ARC-170 and Z-95 Headhunter starfighters to the Galactic Republic during the Clone Wars. When the Galactic Empire ordered them to produce a new starfighter for the Imperial Navy, Incom engineers took inspiration from their previous work to create the X-wing. Production was already underway when politicking resulted in the Empire choosing instead to go with Sienar Fleet Systems' TIE fighter. Faced with an overproduction of expensive starfighters, a new market was found when agents of the Rebel Alliance contacted Incom about acquiring their stock of X-wings, to which Incom eagerly agreed. The X-wing quickly became a symbol of the Rebellion thanks to its use in several spectacular victories and the role it played in ultimately defeating the Empire. After the Empire's defeat, the X-wing starfighters became a staple of the New Republic fleet and later the Resistance, with Incom-FreiTek supplying upgraded T-70 and T-85 models.

Compared to the TIE fighter, the X-wing is slower and less maneuverable in space, but boasts superior firepower, defenses, atmospheric maneuverability, and a superluminal hyperdrive. Its four laser cannons can be fired individually, in pairs or all at once, and each launcher can carry up to three proton torpedoes. In addition to deflector shields, the X-wing possesses a titanium alloy armored hull, electronic countermeasures, and an armored cockpit. An inertial dampener protects the pilot from high-g maneuvers, while an anti-gravity "repulsorlift" provides for flight in planetary atmospheres.

The T-65B X-wing's distinctive strike foils or "s-foils" are opened and closed by powerful servo motors in the spacecraft. When in the open or "attack" position, they provided a greater range of fire to the laser cannons mounted on the end of each wing. They also serve to distribute energy to enlarge the deflector shield, shed waste heat, and function as stabilizer surfaces during suborbital flight.

Instead of a dedicated navigational system, the X-wing uses an astromech droid (such as R2-D2) that fits in a socket behind the cockpit. The droid can hold up to 10 hyperspace coordinates, make minor repairs to the craft, and assume full control of the X-wing if needed. As with the pilot's ejection seat, an explosive charge can eject the droid from the X-wing in an emergency.

=== In Legends ===
According to roleplaying and other literature prior to Disney's acquisition of Lucasfilm, the origin of the X-wing is somewhat different compared to later material. Incom Corporation had already begun designing the X-wing when the Empire's Imperial Security Bureau began to suspect the company of Rebel sympathies. Before the empire could seize control of the company, the designers defected to the Rebel Alliance and handed over the X-wing's schematics.

The Rebel Alliance adopted the military strategy of Doctrine of Space Denial, wherein the Rebellion would raid Imperial boneyards and shipping frigates, both to disrupt Imperial logistics and operations, and also to requisition desperately needed materials. X-wing hyperdrive capabilities allowed for this kind of harassment and escape before the Empire could react. The presence of a hyperdrive and deflector shields differentiate the X-wing from the Empire's TIE fighters, emphasizing the importance the Rebels place on pilots surviving their missions.

Novels and roleplaying material set after Return of the Jedi showed the X-wing continued to be refined and upgraded in service to the New Republic; the "XJ"-series X-wings for example, depicted in the war against the Yuuzhan Vong, have a third proton torpedo launcher, stronger lasers and improved engines. Later in the war, a new variant called the "Stealth-X" was developed specifically for use by the New Jedi Order. These ships were equipped with stealth technology so heavy that many of the ship's functions were replaced by the abilities of it's Force User pilot to avoid electronic emissions that could be detected. Most eponymous of these replacements were the heavy "Shadow Bomb"s the fighters carried which were completely unguided and were instead launched telekinetically by the pilot.

== Merchandise and licensing ==
Kenner Toys produced an X-wing toy as a complement to its action figure line in 1978; this model was made from formed plastic and had a battery-operated light and buzzer in the forward fuselage. The "s-foils" were activated by depressing the molded astromech droid. In 1982, a "battle-damaged" version was released using the same mold but with damage stickers, a grey fuselage, blackened engine inlets, and a darker canopy. In countries outside the U.S., the electronics were removed and the R2-D2 “button” was chrome (apart from the U.S., the electronic X-wing was only available in Brazil, Canada, and France). Kenner also produced a die-cast 1:72 miniature X-wing in 1978 and a smaller scaled version with "battle damage crash feature" for the short lived Micro Collection line in 1982.

The X-wing appeared in four Micro Machines three-packs, including the first Star Wars pack released, a bronzed version, and a pack of three "battle damaged" X-wings with different colored markings. The Micro Machines X-wing has also been released in two single-packs, as a promotional souvenir with German video releases, in a nine-pack of Original Trilogy vehicles, and once in clear plastic. The X-wing appears in the Micro Machines Action Fleet toy line.

Lego also released numerous X-wing models, ranging from a 76-piece miniature X-wing/TIE advanced kit to a 1,304-piece "Ultimate Collector's" model. In 2019, the Lego Group's annual Christmas gift to employees was a 1,038-piece Christmas X-wing, which also included Yoda's igloo and a sleigh. In addition to the original T-65 X-wing, Lego has released several models of the newer T-70 X-wing.

X-wings also appear in numerous Star Wars games and Expanded Universe stories. The player pilots an X-wing in the Atari Star Wars game. It is also a playable ship in numerous LucasArts games, and is the eponymous vessel in the first of several space combat simulator games. Both the Rebel Assault and Rebel Assault II rail shooters include X-wing levels, and X-wing squadrons are controllable units in the Rebellion and Empire at War strategy games. Decipher and Wizards of the Coast published X-wing and X-wing-related cards for the Star Wars Customizable Card Game and Star Wars Trading Card Game, respectively. Michael A. Stackpole and Aaron Allston wrote the X-wing novel series that focuses on the X-wing pilots of Rogue Squadron and Wraith Squadron, the former expanding the story of pilots like Wedge Antilles who appear in the films. Dark Horse Comics has also published an X-Wing Rogue Squadron series. In 2012, Fantasy Flight Games released the Star Wars: X-Wing Miniatures Game featuring several pilots and variations of the ship. The X-wing also included in its Star Wars: Armada miniatures game and Star Wars: Rebellion board game.

== Cultural influence ==
A model of Luke Skywalker's X-wing was among 250 Star Wars-related items on display at the National Air and Space Museum celebrating the franchise's twentieth anniversary. An original X-wing filming prop sold at auction for $160,000 in July 2016. In 2007, the San Diego Tripoli Rocket Association built and launched a 23-foot (7.0 m) X-wing model propelled by four rockets, which disintegrated seconds after liftoff. A life-size X-wing is suspended from the ceiling at the Star Trader gift shop in Disneyland in California, as well as one displayed outdoors by the Star Tours attraction at Disneyland Paris. A life-size X-wing made from Lego blocks appeared in Times Square, and a 3/4-size replica is on display at the Wings Over the Rockies Air & Space Museum in Denver.

In 2018, a number of Star Wars starfighters had their aerodynamic abilities tested using the Autodesk Flow Design virtual wind tunnel program. When tested, the classic T-65 X-wing design had a drag coefficient of 0.45, which is only slightly better than the coefficient of a sphere. The newer T-70 X-wing flown by Poe Dameron was more aerodynamically sound with a rating of 0.24, but still fell short of the F-4E Phantom with its 0.02 drag coefficient. These poor results were rationalized with the in-universe explanations that drag coefficient plays no role in space travel, and that Star Wars fighters can use repulsorlifts and deflector shields to give themselves better flight profiles.

In 2016, Hot Wheels once again created a Star Wars-themed full-sized car, this time was a depiction of the X-wing (dubbed as the 'carship', a combination of 'starships' and 'cars') to coincide the release of the Star Wars Carships line. The car's design was said to be inspired by most of the open- wheeled race cars. It was showcased at San Diego Comic-Con that year and currently as part of the Garage of Legends car collection.

In 2023, Heritage Auctions sold an original 20-inch model of an X-wing starfighter used in the climatic space battle in 1977’s Star Wars for a record-setting $3.135 million.

== See also ==
- List of Star Wars spacecraft
