= Death Star =

Fictional space station and superweapon

- Original Death Star
- First appearance: Star Wars: From the Adventures of Luke Skywalker (1976)
- Created by: George Lucas
- Designed by: Colin Cantwell

Information
- Affiliation: Galactic Empire
- Launched: Constructed in space, Above Geonosis.
- Combat vehicles: TIE Fighters and TIE Bombers

General characteristics
- Class: Orbital battle station Weapon of mass destruction
- Armaments: Superlaser
- Defenses: Turbolasers, Laser cannons, Tractor beams, and Ion cannons
- Maximum speed: Faster than light speed
- Propulsion: Imperial Hyperdrive
- Power: Able to destroy a planet with one shot of the superlaser
- Width: 160 km (99 mi) (Death Star I); 200 km (120 mi) (Death Star II)

The Death Star is a fictional massive space station and superweapon featured in the Star Wars space-opera franchise. Constructed by the autocratic Galactic Empire, the Death Star is capable of obliterating entire planets, and serves to enforce the Empire's reign of terror. It appears as a hundreds of kilometers wide mobile space station that has the shape of a spherical moon or planetoid.

Appearing in the original film Star Wars (1977), the Death Star serves as the central plot point and setting for the film, and is destroyed in an assault by the Rebel Alliance during the climax of the film, with the prequel film Rogue One (2016) and the television series Andor (2022–2025) exploring its construction. A larger second Death Star is being built in the events of the film Return of the Jedi (1983), featuring substantially improved capabilities compared to its predecessor, before it is destroyed by the Rebel Alliance while under construction.

Since its first appearance, the Death Star has become a cultural icon and a widely recognized element of the Star Wars franchise. It inspired numerous similar superweapons in fiction as well as in other Star Wars works. The film The Force Awakens (2015) introduces Starkiller Base, a planet (Ilum) converted by the First Order into a Death Star-like superweapon. While more powerful and technologically advanced than both Death Stars, it is also destroyed by the Resistance. The film The Rise of Skywalker (2019) introduces the Final Order, a massive fleet of Xyston-class Star Destroyers built by the Sith Eternal, individual warships each carrying "planet-killing" weapons; the film also features the remains of the second Death Star, on the ocean moon of Kef Bir.

== Origin and design ==
According to franchise creator George Lucas, his initial outline for the Star Wars saga did not feature the Death Star in the portion that would be adapted as the first film. When he set to creating the first act of this outline as a feature, he borrowed the Death Star concept from the third act.

Although details, such as the superlaser's location, shifted between different concept models during the production of Star Wars (1977), (Note: Later titled Star Wars: Episode IV – A New Hope) the notion of the Death Star being a large, spherical space station over 100 kilometers (62 mi) in diameter was consistent in all of them. George Lucas gave the original task of designing a "Death Star" to concept artist and spaceship modeler Colin Cantwell, who had collaborated with Stanley Kubrick on the 1968 film 2001: A Space Odyssey. In Empire of Dreams, a documentary about the filming and production of Star Wars, Cantwell revealed that the Death Star, built by John Stears, was originally supposed to be a perfect sphere. The model was constructed in two separate pieces, however, and wasn't fitting together as planned, resulting in a depression around the equator. Hoping to save himself a week of work to fill the depression, Cantwell suggested a trench to Lucas, which liked the idea. The buzzing sound counting down to the Death Star firing its superlaser comes from the Flash Gordon serials. Portraying an incomplete yet powerful space station posed a problem for Industrial Light & Magic's modelmakers for Return of the Jedi. Only the front side of the 137-centimeter (54 in) model was completed, and the image was flipped horizontally for the final film. Both Death Stars were depicted by a combination of complete and sectional models and matte paintings.

=== Special effects ===
The explosion special effect depicted in the 2004 Special Edition of A New Hope

The grid plan animation shown during the Rebel briefing before the Death Star attack in A New Hope was an actual computer-graphics simulation developed by Larry Cuba at the University of Illinois Chicago alongside computer graphics researcher Tom DeFanti. George Lucas had recruited Cuba for the project after becoming familiar with his and Gary Imhoff's work with CalArts at the Jet Propulsion Laboratory.

After filming was complete, the original model, as well as one of the surface setpieces, were to be thrown out, but they were eventually salvaged.

The Death Star explosions featured in the Special Edition of A New Hope and in Return of the Jedi are rendered with a Praxis Effect, wherein a flat ring of matter erupts from the explosion.

== Depiction ==
The original Death Star was introduced in the original Star Wars film, which later had elements of its backstory explored in the prequel films Attack of the Clones and Revenge of the Sith, the animated series The Clone Wars, Rebels and The Bad Batch, the 2016 anthology film Rogue One, and the series Andor. The second Death Star appears in Return of the Jedi, and a similar superweapon, Starkiller Base, appears in The Force Awakens.

Both the original and second Death Star were hundreds of kilometres wide, spherical moon- or planetoid-shaped mobile space stations, reminiscent of a world ship or artificial planet, designed for massive power-projection capabilities, capable of destroying an entire planet with a 6.2×10^{32} J/s power output blast from their superlasers.

=== Original Death Star ===
The original Death Star's completed form appears in the original Star Wars film, known as the DS-1 Orbital Battle Station, or Project Stardust in Rogue One; before learning the true name of the weapon, the Rebel Alliance referred to it as the "Planet Killer". Outside of the highest echelons of the Empire, it was known as Project Celestial Power and to the wider citizenry as the Energy Initiative, with its stated purpose to provide Imperial worlds with sustainable energy sources. Commanded by Governor Tarkin, it is the Galactic Empire's "ultimate weapon", (Note: The space station is also called "Ultimate Weapon" by the Confederacy of Independent Systems (CIS), who commissioned the original designs.) a huge spherical battle station 160 kilometers (99 mi) in diameter capable of destroying a planet with one shot of its superlaser.

Emperor Palpatine (left) and Darth Vader (right) overseeing the construction of the first Death Star in Star Wars: Episode III – Revenge of the Sith

The film opens with Princess Leia transporting the station's schematics to the Rebel Alliance to aid them in destroying the Death Star. To mark the Death Star being fully operational, Tarkin orders the Death Star to destroy Leia's home world of Alderaan in an attempt to press her into giving him the location of the secret Rebel headquarters; she gives them the location of Dantooine, which housed a now-deserted Rebel base, but Tarkin has Alderaan destroyed anyway as a demonstration of the Empire's resolve. Later, Luke Skywalker, Han Solo, Chewbacca, Obi-Wan Kenobi, C-3PO, and R2-D2 (who were intended to arrive at Alderaan on board the Millennium Falcon) are pulled aboard the station by a tractor beam, where they discover and manage to rescue Princess Leia. As they make their escape, Obi-Wan sacrifices himself whilst dueling Darth Vader, enabling the others to flee the station. Later, Luke returns as part of a fighter force to attack its only weak point: a ray-shielded particle exhaust vent leading straight from the surface directly into its reactor core, discovered previously from the stolen schematics. Luke is able to successfully launch his X-wing fighter's torpedoes into the vent, impacting the core and triggering a catastrophic explosion, which destroys the station before it can annihilate the Rebel base on Yavin 4.

The Death Star's schematics are visible in the scenes on Geonosis in Star Wars: Episode II – Attack of the Clones, evidently designed by Geonosians led by Archduke Poggle the Lesser, a member of the Confederacy of Independent Systems, and is shown early in construction at the end of Episode III – Revenge of the Sith. The Clone Wars Legacy story reel from the unfinished Crystal Crisis on Utapau episodes reveals that General Grievous went to Utapau prior to Revenge of the Sith in order to acquire an enormous kyber crystal to power the Death Star's superlaser.

As depicted in Rogue One and Catalyst: A Rogue One Novel (2016), the Death Star was worked on by a team of engineers sequestered on the rainswept world of Eadu, overseen by Orson Krennic, the Director of Advanced Weapons Research for the Imperial Military. Under Krennic's supervision, the project was beset by constant delays, and he forcibly recruited weapons designer Galen Erso (the father of Jyn Erso, the film's protagonist) to complete the design. The Death Star scientists sought to fuse kyber crystal shards into larger structures and used those crystals to amplify energy into a stable beam powerful enough to destroy an entire planet. In the Disney+ series, Andor, set after the novel but before the film, prisoners of the Imperial Prison Complex in Narkina 5, including Cassian Andor, who was sent to the facility under the alias Keef Girgo, assembled fasteners during their shifts, which was revealed in the post-credits scene of the first season finale to be parts built for the superlaser dish.

The second season of Andor depicts the Ghorman project, a covert working group formed in 4 BBY and led by Krennic designed to carry out the suppression of the planet Ghorman with propaganda campaigns in place throughout the galaxy designed to turn public opinion on the Ghor people and justify the Empire's need to gouge-mine the planet of the mineral kalkite, which was necessary to coat the Death Star's reactor lenses. At the suggestion of Imperial Security Bureau Supervisor Dedra Meero, who was given control of the project, the Empire allowed the local Ghorman Front resistance group to grow bolder in their anti-Imperial activities and give the Empire justification for their crackdowns. Their increased resistance culminated in the Ghorman Massacre in 2 BBY, where the Empire violently suppressed countless peaceful protesters in the planet's capital Palmo. The genocide fully radicalized Senior Senator Mon Mothma against the Galactic Empire, causing her to publicly condemn and name Palpatine as the perpetrator, accusing him of "unprovoked genocide" and being "the monster who will come for us all soon enough" and immediately being declared a traitor, though she was able to escape with the aid of Cassian Andor and later Gold Squadron and the Spectres, allowing her to formally organize the Rebel Alliance in a speech over Dantooine.

The 2014 book Star Wars: Tarkin details the life of Grand Moff Tarkin and prominently features the Death Star. Catalyst: A Rogue One Novel tells the story of the development of the Death Star's superweapon by Galen Erso and Krennic's deception of him. It also reveals how Poggle worked with Krennic on the project but then turned on him. In the animated series Star Wars Rebels, the two-part episode "Ghosts of Geonosis" hints that the Geonosians were nearly wiped out to extinction out of the Empire's need for secrecy. Saw Gerrera, having been sent to Geonosis to investigate, deduces that the Empire possesses a superweapon and resolves to discover the Death Star as depicted in the two-part episode "In the Name of the Rebellion". Though it is a dead end, Saw learns that the weapon is powered by kyber crystals taken from the Jedha system. The 2019 book Thrawn: Treason details Imperial leadership's dissatisfaction with Krennic's constant delays on the Death Star's construction and the title character's push for a more cost-effective solution to handle the growing rebellion. This competing project was known as the TIE Defender and was a drastic departure from the Imperial Navy's capital ship-based warfare by implementing features uncommon for TIE fighters and its variants including hyperdrives, deflector shields, and heavy armaments, and was capable of exceeding Rebel equivalents in ship-to-ship combat. Though the TIE Defender was able to secure funding meant for the Death Star and produced highly promising results, including Darth Vader himself endorsing the project and the production of an improved prototype based on his suggestions from piloting one, it was ultimately never fully realized due to Governor Arihnda Pryce destroying the fuel depot on Lothal to kill Jedi Knight Kanan Jarrus. The destruction of the fuel depot put the project on indefinite hold and redirected funding back to the Death Star, with further setbacks after Thrawn's disappearance at the Liberation of Lothal and Tarkin's death at the Battle of Yavin, resulting in TIE Defenders having a limited production run and never seeing widespread usage during the Galactic Civil War.

In the lead-up to Rogue One and A New Hope during the final three-episode block of Andor, the Death Star's existence was discovered among Meero's files by ISB Lieutenant Supervisor and Axis network spy Lonni Jung, learning that Palpatine's energy project was a cover for its planet-destroying capabilities. He also learns that everything enacted up to that point on his behalf in the series was meant to accelerate its completion. While Jung was killed by Luthen Rael to eliminate him as a loose end and later Rael himself being euthanized by Kleya Marki to prevent his interrogation, the information was eventually passed on to Alliance High Command, though they doubted the weapon's existence due to their strained relationship with the Axis network spymaster, which was verified by Cassian Andor during the events of Rogue One. Rogue One proper focuses on a small band of rebels under the titular improvised callsign and their actions in stealing the plans containing the weakness exploited in A New Hope. The Death Star is first used to destroy Jedha City, both as a response to a violent insurgency on the planet and as a display of the Death Star's operational status. Tarkin assumes control over the Death Star while Krennic investigates security breaches in the design project. It is subsequently revealed that Galen discreetly sabotaged the design by building a vulnerability into the reactor. After the Death Star plans are stolen from the Scarif vault, Tarkin fires the Death Star's superlaser on the base, killing Krennic, as well as Jyn Erso and her small band of rebels. Rogue One also reveals that the Death Star's superlaser is powered by multiple reactors, allowing it to vary its destructive power depending on the target; both the attack on Jedha City and the Scarif base used a single reactor.

According to Star Wars reference books, the population of the Death Star was 1.7 million military personnel, 400,000 maintenance droids, and 250,000 civilians, associated contractors and catering staff. The Death Star was defended by thousands of turbolasers, ion cannons and laser cannons, plus a complement of seven to nine thousand TIE fighters, along with tens of thousands of support craft. It also had several massive docking bays, including dry docks capable of accommodating Star Destroyers.

A hologram of the original Death Star is briefly visible in a scene at the Resistance base in The Force Awakens and used as a means of comparison with one from the First Order's own superweapon, Starkiller Base.

=== Second Death Star ===
The second Death Star

The 1983 film Return of the Jedi features the DS-2 Orbital Battle Station under construction as it orbits the forest moon Endor, which houses a shield generator protecting the station. The second Death Star is substantially more advanced and more powerful than its predecessor, and the critical weakness found in the first Death Star has been removed—the Rebel Alliance's only hope is to destroy it prior to its completion. The Emperor and Darth Vader send the Rebels false information that the station's weapons systems are not yet complete in order to lure the Alliance fleet into a trap, resulting in the decisive Battle of Endor. In fact, the station's superlaser is fully operational, and it begins firing on and destroying Rebel capital ships during the battle.

A ground assault team led by Han Solo with the help of the Endor-native Ewoks successfully manages to disable the shield generator, allowing Rebel pilots Wedge Antilles and Lando Calrissian to fly into the station (using Han's Millennium Falcon) and fire on its reactor, triggering a meltdown that causes the battlestation to self-destruct.

An early draft of Return of the Jedi features two Death Stars at various stages of completion. According to the Star Wars Encyclopedia, the second Death Star had at its "north pole ... a heavily armored 100-story tower topped by the Emperor's private observation chamber." The size of the second Death Star has not remained consistent among the various writers for the Star Wars franchise, with some stating it shared the first Death Star's 160-kilometer (99 mi) radius and others claiming it was much more massive with a 900-kilometer (560 mi) radius. The most recent figure established in 2017 by Ryder Windham gives the second Death Star a radius of 200 kilometers (120 mi).

The second Death Star is featured on the cover of the book Star Wars: Aftermath (2015), which also features many flashbacks to the destruction of the second Death Star, as well as the events directly after its destruction. One of the main characters in the story personally escaped the explosion of the Death Star. The destruction of the second Death Star was also shown in holograms in the book. The 2015 comic book Star Wars: Shattered Empire also explores the days following the destruction of the second Death Star from the perspective of Poe Dameron's parents, who were pilots during the event. The video game Star Wars: Uprising also takes place during the aftermath of the second Death Star's destruction, and features a hologram of its description on multiple occasions in and out of cutscenes.

Part of the wreckage of the second Death Star appears in The Rise of Skywalker (2019), on the ocean moon Kef Bir. Rey visits the wreckage to obtain the Emperor's wayfinder, a device that points the way to his hidden lair on Exegol.

=== Similar superweapons ===
The 2019 comic Star Wars #68 reveals that the Rebels considered creating their own version of a Death Star by luring Star Destroyers to a tectonically unstable planet and setting it off with proton detonators.

==== Starkiller Base ====
Starkiller Base

The Force Awakens features Starkiller Base, a Death Star-like superweapon built by the First Order, an autocratic regime considered to be the successor of the Empire. Significantly larger than both previous Death Stars, the superweapon was constructed out of an existing planet called Ilum instead of being assembled in deep space. The base draws its raw firepower by harnessing energy directly from a nearby star. Unlike its predecessors, Starkiller Base is capable of firing on and destroying multiple planets at once from extreme range—in the film, the First Order obliterates the five planets in the Hosnian Prime system, at that time the capital of the New Republic. Starkiller Base is protected by a defensive shield that blocks all objects traveling at slower-than-light speeds; Han Solo, Chewbacca, and Finn exploit a vulnerability by bypassing the shield at faster-than-light speeds, successfully infiltrating the base and sabotaging its shields. Subsequently, an X-wing assault led by Poe Dameron and Nien Nunb destroys the superweapon by damaging the base's thermal oscillator and fuel cells, resulting in a catastrophic release of energy from the planet's core. As Resistance forces flee, the planet implodes and forms a star.

The name Starkiller Base pays homage to the early drafts of the original Star Wars film, referring to Luke Skywalker's original surname. Coincidentally, the name "Starkiller" is an alias given to Galen Marek by Darth Vader in the 2008 game, Star Wars: The Force Unleashed. During early concept development, artist Doug Chiang envisioned the superweapon's gun as set inside a volcano, which X-wings would have to enter in a maneuver similar to the trench run on the Death Star in the original film.

==== Sith Star Destroyers ====
In The Rise of Skywalker, the ninth installment in the series, the resurrected Darth Sidious is revealed to have constructed the Sith Eternal's fleet of Xyston-class Star Destroyers, the Final Order, over the Sith planet Exegol. They were constructed during the reign of the Galactic Empire and well after the Galactic Civil War and are outwardly identical to the Imperial-class Star Destroyers previously used by the Empire, with key differences including being larger in size, having red accents evocative of Sith imagery along their hulls, and being armed with axial superlasers powered by bled kyber crystals capable of destroying planets; Sidious uses one of the Star Destroyers to destroy the planet Kijimi as a show of force. At the end of the film, the Resistance launches an offensive against the Sith Eternal forces, including the Sith fleet. Aided by reinforcements from across the galaxy, the Resistance defeats the remaining Sith forces by destroying the onboard superlasers, which ignited the ships reactors and destroyed them one by one. The Resistance also destroyed the Resurgent-class Star Destroyer Steadfast and the navigation signal that the fleet needed to exit the planet due to the unstable nature of the atmosphere.

=== Expanded Universe ===
Both Death Stars and similar superweapons appear throughout the non-canonical Star Wars Legends continuity. National Public Radio's Star Wars adaptation (1981) portrays Leia (Ann Sachs) and Bail Organa's (Stephen Elliott) discovery of the Death Star's existence and how Leia obtained its schematics. The 1983 Star Wars arcade game and numerous LucasArts titles recreate the films' attacks on the Death Stars.

Kevin J. Anderson's Jedi Academy trilogy (1994) introduces the Maw Cluster of black holes that protect a laboratory where the DS-X Prototype Battle Station was built (consisting of the superstructure, power core, and superlaser). The first level of LucasArts' Dark Forces (1995) gives mercenary Kyle Katarn the role of stealing the plans that are subsequently given to Leia. Steve Perry's novel Shadows of the Empire (1996) describes a mission that leads to the Rebels learning of the second Death Star's existence, and that mission is playable in LucasArts' X-Wing Alliance space flight simulator (1999). In Greg Bear's Rogue Planet (2000) a first design called "Expeditionary Battle Planetoid" is put forward by Imperial designer Raith Sienar.

The Death Star itself is a controllable weapon for the Empire in the Rebellion (1998) and Empire at War (2006) strategy game. (Note: In Empire at War, if the Imperial fleet defending the Death Star is defeated and the hero unit of Red Squadron is present, the Death Star will be destroyed.) In Battlefront II (2005), the player participates in a mission to secure crystals used in the Death Star's superlaser. Another mission in the game tasks the player with acting as a stormtrooper or Darth Vader in an attempt to recover the plans and capture Leia. The first Death Star under construction acts as the final stage in the video game The Force Unleashed (2008).

The first Death Star's construction is the subject of Michael Reaves and Steve Perry's novel Death Star (2007), which depicts the many politics and hidden agendas behind the massive project, from its construction up until its final destruction.

The first Death Star's hangars contain assault shuttles, blastboats, Strike cruisers, land vehicles, support ships, and 7,293 TIE fighters. It is also protected by 10,000 turbolaser batteries, 2,600 ion cannons, and at least 768 tractor beam projectors. Various sources state that the first Death Star has a diameter of between 140 and 160 kilometers. There is a broader range of figures for the second Death Star's diameter, ranging from 160 to 900 kilometers.

==== DS-X Prototype Battle Station ====
In the Legends works Death Star (2007), Dark Empire II, Jedi Search and Champions of the Force, an experimental Death Star prototype, DS-X (a durasteel frame surrounding a reactor core, superlaser, engines and a control room) was conceived by Grand Moff Wilhuff Tarkin as a test bed for the first Death Star. It was constructed by Bevel Lemelisk and his engineers at the Empire's secret Maw Installation. The prototype measured 120 kilometers in diameter. Its superlaser was only powerful enough to destroy a planet's core, rendering it an uninhabitable "dead planet". The targeting system on the prototype was never calibrated and the superlaser was inefficient, leaving the weapon's batteries drained - Engineers in the control room claimed it would take 10–15 minutes to recharge batteries after the first shot was fired. The prototype had no interior except a slave-linked control room, hyperdrive engines and other components; the station operated with skeleton-crew of 75 personnel. The prototype was later destroyed when it was drawn into the black holes surrounding the Maw cluster itself.

==== Death Star III ====
In the Disney attraction Star Tours – The Adventures Continue, guests can travel inside an incomplete Death Star during one of the randomized ride sequences. In the original Star Tours, a Death Star III is seen and destroyed during the ride sequence by the New Republic. Leland Chee originally created the third Death Star to explain why a Death Star is present on the Star Tours ride when both of the stations in the film were destroyed. The station is being built near the Forest Moon of Endor like the second Death Star before. It is similar to an original concept for Return of the Jedi, where two Death Stars would have been built near Had Abbadon (then the Imperial capital world). The Habitation spheres, based on the Imperials' spurious claims that they were designed strictly for peaceful purposes, were suggested by some fans to have been the origin for the Death Star III. This was later revealed to be the case in Part 2 of the StarWars.com Blog series The Imperial Warlords: Despoilers of an Empire. In the Expanded Universe game Star Wars: Tiny Death Star, a random HoloNet entry states that one of the residents of the Death Star is simply staying there until he can afford to stay at the third Death Star.

==== Other superweapons ====
In the original Marvel Star Wars comic series (1977–1986), a superweapon called "The Tarkin" is built. It is described as being similar to the Death Star but with more energy. Darth Vader commands it and Luke, Leia, Chewbacca, C-3PO, and R2-D2 sabotage it with Lando's help. It is finally destroyed by an Imperial officer attempting to use an ionic weapon to both attack the escaping Rebels and assassinate Vader. Later in the series, a nihilistic group attempts to use a weapon to dislodge a planet from its orbit and cause others to do the same in a chain reaction, thereby destroying the entire universe.

In the Dark Empire comic series (1991–95), the reborn Emperor Palpatine's flagships Eclipse and Eclipse II Super Star Destroyers (Star Dreadnoughts) have a miniaturized version of the Death Star superlaser. The first Eclipse was under construction over Kuat at the time of the Emperor's death at Endor; shortly thereafter, the incomplete Eclipse was briefly captured by the Zann Consortium during a battle over the planet's shipyards, turning its superlaser against the Empire and Rebels and emerged victorious against both; it was quickly abandoned following the battle as it was too large a target for the Rebels to ignore. The vessel was retrieved by remnants of the Empire and completed, and later served as the flagship of the resurrected Palpatine. It was destroyed by a Force storm enhanced by Luke and Leia, who had been brought aboard by the Emperor in hopes that they could be converted to the dark side. The Eclipse II was mostly identical to its predecessor save for a handful of visual changes, and fulfilled the same purpose. It was later destroyed when an errant projectile from the destroyed Galaxy Gun, another superweapon developed under the returned Palpatine, fell onto the ship and caused a massive explosion that destroyed not only the ship and its accompanying fleet, but also the nearby Imperial citadel of Byss.

In Kevin J. Anderson's novel Darksaber (1995), Death Star designer Bevel Lemelisk is recruited by the Hutts to build a superlaser weapon. Due to their refusal to sufficiently fund and supply the project, the resultant 'superweapon' is quickly destroyed by a combination of the tumultuous Hoth asteroid field in which it was built and the efforts of the New Republic. Lemelisk is captured and incarcerated by the Republic, and is later executed for his hand in the design and construction of Imperial superweapons.

The novel Children of the Jedi (1995) involves the return of Eye of Palpatine, a "colossal, asteroid-shaped" super dreadnaught constructed at the behest of Emperor Palpatine during the second year of the Galactic Civil War. The Imperials lose control of the Eye when a Jedi uses the Force to hijack the main computer with their spirits.

== Cultural influence ==
The Death Star placed ninth in a 2008 20th Century Fox poll of the most popular film weapons.

It has been referred to outside of the Star Wars context in such examples as:

- AT&T Corporation's logo, designed by Saul Bass and introduced in 1982, is informally referred to as the "Death Star". Ars Technica referred to "the AT&T Death Star" in an article criticizing a company data policy. Competitor T-Mobile mocked AT&T's "Death Star" logo and "Empire-like reputation" in a press release.
- In Kevin Smith's first feature film, Clerks (1994), Randal Graves points out that many independent contractors would have been killed in the second Death Star's destruction. In the DVD audio commentary for Attack of the Clones, George Lucas says that the inclusion of the holographic Death Star in the film implies that the Geonosians were the contractors discussed by "Jay and Silent Bob".
- KTCK (SportsRadio 1310 The Ticket) in Dallas were the first to use the term "Death Star" to describe the new mammoth Cowboys Stadium, now AT&T Stadium, in Arlington, Texas. The term has since spread to local media and is generally accepted as a nickname for the stadium.
- The Death Star strategy was the name Enron gave to one of their fraudulent business practices for manipulating California's energy market.
- In the novels of the Bridge Trilogy, the San Francisco Police Department admonishes its officers to stop referring to their surveillance satellite as the "Death Star".
- In the 1987 Star Wars parody film Spaceballs, the Spaceballs use a spacecraft called "Spaceball I", which can change shape into "Mega Maid", resembling a woman with a vacuum cleaner. A reference to the Death Star destroying Alderaan, the Mega Maid is used to drain Druidia's atmosphere of fresh air.
- While mostly ground based, the Technodrome from the 1987 Teenage Mutant Ninja Turtles cartoon and 1988 Teenage Mutant Ninja Turtles Adventures comics is based on the Death Star.
- The Sonic the Hedgehog video game series features a parody of the Death Star known as the "Death Egg", a battle station created by Doctor Eggman that serves as a level in multiple games.
- Donald Trump's 2020 presidential campaign was nicknamed the "Death Star" by some of its members.
- Las Vegas Raiders owner Mark Davis dubbed the nickname of the team's new Allegiant Stadium in Paradise, Nevada as the "Death Star".
- The Social Sciences and Humanities Building at the University of California, Davis is referred to by students as the "Death Star", due to its shiny metallic exterior and maze-like architecture.
- Because of its resemblance to the Death Star, the logo for the Illinois Central Railroad that was adopted in 1988 is commonly referred to by railfans as the “Death Star”; this term also applies to the all-black paint scheme of the locomotives which the logo was found on. Some IC locomotives still use this logo, although they are slowly being repainted into Canadian National Railway colors following CN's acquisition of the IC in 1998.

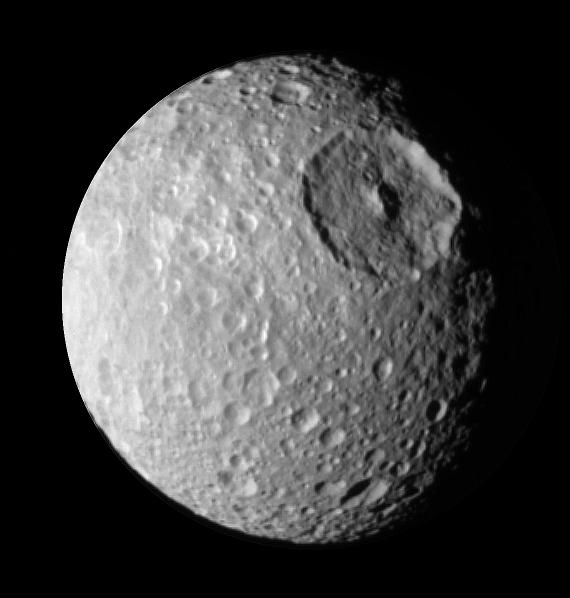
The large crater Herschel on the Saturnian moon Mimas gives it a resemblance to the Death Star, and its size is halfway between that of the first and second Death Star.

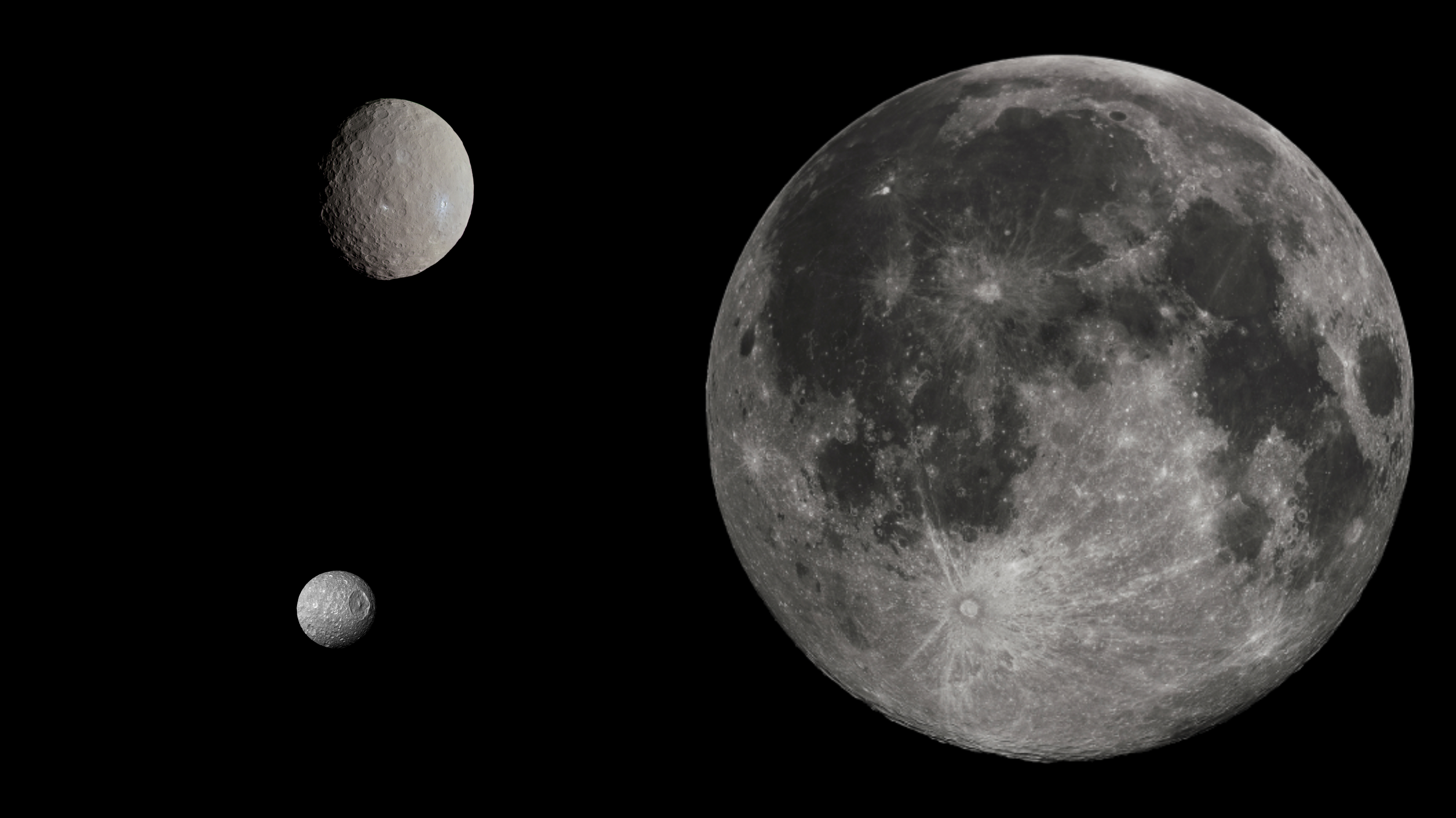
Mimas compared to the dwarf planet Ceres and the Moon at scale

=== Astronomy ===
In 1981, following the Voyager spacecraft's flight past Saturn, scientists noticed a resemblance between one of the planet's moons, Mimas, and the Death Star. Additionally, some media outlets used the term "Death Star" to describe Nemesis, a hypothetical star postulated in 1984 to be responsible for gravitationally forcing comets and asteroids from the Oort cloud toward the inner Solar System.

=== Merchandise ===
Kenner and AMT created a playset and a model, respectively, of the first Death Star. In 2005 and 2008, Lego released models of Death Star II and Death Star I, respectively. In 1979, Palitoy created a heavy card version of the Death Star as a playset for the vintage range of action figures in the UK, Australia and Canada. Both Death Stars are part of different Micro Machines three-packs. The Death Stars and locations in them are cards in Decipher, Inc.'s and Wizards of the Coast's Star Wars Customizable Card Game and Star Wars Trading Card Game, respectively. Hasbro released a Death Star model that transforms into a Darth Vader mech. Estes Industries released a flying model rocket version.

A Death Star trinket box was also released by Royal Selangor in 2015, in conjunction with the December screening of Star Wars: The Force Awakens that year, and in 2016, Plox released the official levitating Death Star Speaker in anticipation of that year's screening of Rogue One.

Lego released a gift with purchase for Star Wars Day 2023 of a mini Death Star II.

Lego released the Ultimate Collector Series Death Star in October 2025, also said to be the most expensive set at $1,000.

=== Political campaigns ===
In 2012–13, a (satirical) proposal on the White House's website urging the United States government to build a real Death Star as an economic stimulus and job creation measure gained more than 30,000 signatures, enough to qualify for an official response. The official (tongue-in-cheek) response was released in January 2013: the cost of building a real Death Star has been estimated in 2012 by a Centives economics blog of Lehigh University to $850 quadrillion, or about 13,000 times the worldwide gross domestic product, as well as at current rates of steel production, the Death Star would not be ready for more than 833,000 years. The White House response also stated that "the Administration does not support blowing up planets," and questioned funding a weapon "with a fundamental flaw that can be exploited by a one-man starship" as reasons for denying the petition.

The Luxembourgish magician Christian Lavey (born as Christian Kies) submitted a petition for the construction of a Death Star to the Luxembourgish parliament. In an interview with a local radio station, however Lavey admitted that this petition was just a joke and some kind of protest against the space plans of the government.

== See also ==
- Artificial planet
- World ship
