= TIE fighter =

Fictional spacecraft from Star Wars

TIE fighter (original model)
- Star Wars vehicle
- A pair of standard TIE starfighters
- First appearance: Star Wars: From the Adventures of Luke Skywalker (1976 novelization)
- Created by: Colin Cantwell; Joe Johnston

Information
- Affiliation: Galactic Empire; First Order; Sith Eternal
- Made by: Sienar Fleet Systems

General characteristics
- Class: Space superiority fighter
- Armaments: Laser cannons
- Maximum speed: 1,200 km/h (in atmosphere); 100 MGLT (megalight per hour, in space)
- Propulsion: Twin ion engines
- Power: Solar ionization reactor
- Length: 7.2 meters (23 ft 9 in)
- Width: 6.7 meters (21 ft 11 in)
- Height: 8.8 meters (28 ft 11 in)
- Population volume: 1 pilot

The Twin Ion Engine (TIE) fighter is a series of fictional starfighters featured in the Star Wars universe. TIE fighters are depicted as fast, agile, yet fragile starfighters used by the Galactic Empire, First Order, and the Sith Eternal. TIE fighters and other TIE craft appear in Star Wars films, television shows, and throughout the Star Wars expanded universe. Several TIE fighter replicas and toys, as well as an eponymous flight simulator game, have been produced and sold by many companies.

== Production ==
=== Origin and design for Star Wars ===
A sketch George Lucas provided to Ralph McQuarrie of his concept of an imperial fighter for Star Wars (1977). Note the "cockpit-ball-and-wings" design that persists across subsequent TIE craft in the franchise.

Star Wars creator George Lucas provided descriptions and hand-drawn illustrations of several ships, including what would become the TIE fighter, to illustrator Ralph McQuarrie and model maker Colin Cantwell. Lucas was influenced in part by illustrations by John Berkey. Cantwell created illustrations and a concept model that established the TIE fighter's ball-cockpit and hexagonal panels design. Joe Johnston created additional details, and John Dykstra made adjustments to accommodate the practicalities of model making and filming. Lucas later stated the final TIE fighter design was "60 percent mine and 40 percent Cantwell's."

Model makers made the TIE fighter models small enough for one person to manipulate in the studio and in sufficient quantity that multiple filming sessions could occur at once. Having been told that TIEs were mass produced and easily replaced, the models did not have many weathering effects to suggest long-term use. Initially given a blue color scheme, the models were grey to film better against a bluescreen. The effects team would have preferred to build larger TIE models for pyrotechnic effects, but the budget prevented that. Whereas the main shooting models were built from plastic, the TIEs that would be destroyed by pyrotechnics were constructed from foam. Because the Primacord explosion occurred too rapidly for even high-speed film to record, effects artists layered separate explosion effects of various scales on top of the footage of the model being destroyed.

Although the script did not specify that Darth Vader fly a different type of TIE, model makers understood that audiences would need to distinguish his vessel from the others. They adjusted the shape of the vessel's wings and darkened the solar panel grill to create Vader's distinct "TIE Advanced x1". The wings were removable so a damaged one could easily be inserted to show battle damage. Despite being different TIE varieties, the same cockpit set was used for both types of TIE craft. As such, Vader's cockpit is depicted with the same rear window as the other TIEs despite the shooting model having no such portal.

Although the fragile-looking TIE fighters did not seem aggressive, sound designer Ben Burtt gave them menace through their distinctive fly-by sound. The sound was derived by combining an elephant call with a car driving on wet pavement. The Sounds of Star Wars likens the TIE's engine roar to Junkers Ju 87 dive bombers, which used sirens to frighten civilians during air raids. Combat scenes between TIE fighters and the Millennium Falcon and X-wing fighters in Star Wars were meant to be reminiscent of World War II dogfight footage; editors used World War II air combat clips as placeholders while Industrial Light & Magic (ILM) completed the movie's special effects.

=== Subsequent films ===
The TIE bomber introduced in The Empire Strikes Back (1980) was based on an unused design from Star Wars (1977).

Introduced in 1983's Return of the Jedi, the TIE interceptor's dagger-like wings inspired Andor's TIE Avenger design over 40 years later.

New TIE fighter models, and TIE fighter antecedents, were developed for subsequent franchise media. TIE bombers hunting the Millennium Falcon in The Empire Strikes Back were based on an unused "TIE boarding craft" concept developed for Star Wars. The boarding craft concept was also used for a shuttle ferrying Captain Needa. The TIE bomber's double-hull design led ILM's model makers to dub the ship a "double chili dog" fighter. Joe Johnson and Larry Tan designed the TIE interceptors introduced in Return of the Jedi to be look fast, deadly, sleek, and frightening. They stretched the wings forward, then carved out a slot so as not to diminish the pilot's field of view. Model makers created interceptor models in two scales. TIE fighters in The Empire Strikes Back and Return of the Jedi shifted to the muted blue color originally intended for the TIEs in Star Wars.

Over the course of the prequel films, several ship designs evoke or anticipate the eventual rise of the Imperial TIE fighter. Doug Chiang took inspiration from the TIE interceptor and Imperial shuttle to design Darth Maul's Sith Interceptor for The Phantom Menace (1999). The Jedi starfighter created for Revenge of the Sith (2005) was designed to bridge the appearance of the Jedi starfighter in Attack of the Clones (2002) and the TIE fighter design from the original trilogy. The V-wing starfighter, seen at the end of Revenge of the Sith, makes the TIE fighter sound and has a similar front silhouette.

The TIE striker introduced in Rogue One (2016) places its wings above the cockpit like a glider, meant to suggest it is designed for use in an atmosphere.

Several new TIEs appear in the sequel trilogy. Designers for The Force Awakens (2015) had discussed how much to "update" the TIE fighter for the first sequel film, which is set 30 years after Return of the Jedi. They retained the starfighter's design but altered its aesthetic to suggest improvements to the vessel's manufacturing process and materials. Kylo Ren's TIE silencer in The Last Jedi (2017) was based on the TIE interceptor, but stretched further to make it appear more aggressive. The design is also meant to echo the aggressive design of the character's mask. The TIE dagger in The Rise of Skywalker (2019) is conceived as the next evolution of the original TIE fighter, with its triangular wings reminiscent of the outline of a Star Destroyer.

=== Design for other media ===
Dark Horse Comics' Sean Cooke designed the TIE predator for Star Wars: Legacy (2006), set 130 years after the events of Star Wars, to appear both reminiscent of and more advanced than the original TIE fighter. The TIE fighter flown by Darth Vader and Imperial Inquisitors in Star Wars: Rebels (2014–18) was inspired by Ralph McQuarrie's original design for Vader's Star Wars TIE fighter.

The TIE interceptor's wings inspired the design for the TIE Avenger in Andor's second season (2025). Although a "TIE Avenger" was created for LucasArts' 1994 TIE Fighter flight simulator, that vessel did not inspire the Andor design; instead, producers "reverse-engineered" the ship's design based on the story's needs. The ship's armaments were inspired by real-world weapons. Producers created a full-scale version of the Avenger, which was then digitized and used by ILM for visual effects work.

== Depiction ==
Grand Moff Tarkin commissioned Sienar Fleet Systems to design and manufacture the original TIE fighter and most TIE variants. Tarkin specified that the TIE had to be fast, maneuverable, energy-efficient, inexpensive, and produce a distinctive sound to strike fear into the Empire's enemies; they are meant to be easily mass-produced and engage in swarm tactics, with the expectation of being expendable assets that would be lost in combat. To meet these requirements, Sienar incorporated aspects of the V-wing and Jedi interceptor into the new starfighter.

TIE fighters have two wings fitted with solar panels that power a twin ion engine (TIE) system. This engine system accelerates ionized gases at a substantial fraction of lightspeed along almost any vector, affording the ships tremendous speed and maneuverability, albeit with limited fuel reserves. The wings are strong enough to double as landing gear and feature repulsorlifts for take-off and landing, though TIE fighters are designed to be launched and recovered by cycling storage racks used by Imperial starships and garrisons. The basic TIE fighter's primary weapon is a pair of laser cannons tied to a dedicated power generator and targeting computer. The TIE fighter lacks a hyperdrive, not only to save on weight and cost but also to discourage defection. To reduce costs and increase maneuverability, most TIE variants lack deflector shields; vulnerable to direct hits from enemy starfighters, this further encourages pilots to shoot first and accurately.

TIE fighter pilots are considered elite within the Imperial Navy, relying on their quick reflexes and fearlessness to survive multiple tours of duty. Training involves hundreds of flight hours learning to coordinate as a team and intense psychological conditioning to put the accomplishment of their mission above other considerations. As such, most TIE fighter pilots have a life expectancy of less than a year. Django Wexler hoped his short story in The Empire Strikes Back: From a Certain Point of View anthology (2017) would help readers "think about the fact that most TIE fighter pilots are probably unfortunate conscripts with families who love them." Because their cockpits lack life-support systems, TIE fighter pilots wear self-contained flight suits connected to reinforced vacuum-sealed flight helmets. The pressurized flight suit also protects the pilot when forced to eject into space.

First Order TIE fighters resemble their Imperial counterparts and feature more advanced technology. First Order TIEs have deflector shields, increasing survivability and illustrating the higher value the First Order places on its pilots. First Order TIE pilot candidates are identified as children based on their eyesight, reflexes, and obedience. Like their Imperial counterparts, they undergo intense physical training and drilling, and they grow up aboard Star Destroyers to familiarize them with shipboard operations.

== Reception ==
=== Cultural impact ===
A TIE fighter model used in filming the climax of Star Wars sold at auction for $350,000, and another TIE fighter from the film sold at auction for $402,500. A Wired editor's creation of a TIE fighter model out of Starbucks cups and stirrers prompted the magazine to create a contest for its readers to submit their own art out of similar Starbucks material. The TIE Fighter (Japanese: タイファイター) obstacle was used in the 32nd to 35th competitions of Sasuke (also known as Ninja Warrior). Competitors must prop their hands and feet against a set of glass panels that much resemble to the two hexagonal wings of a TIE fighter, position themselves and slide down a track to reach the safety platform at the other side.

Kenner released TIE fighter and TIE interceptor toys during the original Star Wars trilogy's theatrical release, and Kenner's die-cast TIE bomber is a rare collector's item. Hasbro also released TIE fighter, TIE bomber, and TIE interceptor toys. Both Kenner and Hasbro also manufactured TIE fighter pilot action figures. In 1994, LucasArts released the TIE Fighter flight simulator, which casts the player as an Imperial pilot flying a variety of TIE starfighters. TIE starfighters and their variants are also playable in third- or first-person perspectives in several other Star Wars titles. Decipher and Wizards of the Coast published various TIE starfighter and TIE-related cards for the Star Wars Customizable Card Game and Star Wars Trading Card Game, respectively. In 2012, Fantasy Flight Games released Star Wars: X-Wing Miniatures Game, a miniatures game with pre-painted and to scale miniature X-wings and TIE fighters. Lego manufactured multiple TIE models.

In 2005, an American Army officer suggested that modern soldiers needed to be more like "TIE fighters" by using small team, high mobility, and swarming tactics. He contrasted this approach against expensive, behemoth "Death Star" approaches. Director Louis Leterrier used TIE fighter sounds in the audio mix of Fast X (2023).

Various scientists and engineers have subjected TIE fighters and other Star Wars craft to aerodynamic studies. The original TIE fighter and its variants rate poorly for aerodynamic viability, with those results rationalized with explanations that atmospheric factors plays no role in space travel, and that Star Wars fighters can use repulsorlifts and deflector shields to give themselves better flight profiles in an atmosphere. Given current technology levels, it will take significant time for real-world equivalents to match the performance of the TIE Fighter's 'laser' cannons and ion engines, while the anti-gravity technology it uses to fly has yet to be invented.

=== Critical response ===
Screen Rant called Darth Vader's TIE fighter the best Imperial starship, with other TIE variants elsewhere on their top 15 list. ComicBook.com included TIE fighters on their list of Star Wars vehicles more impressive than the Millennium Falcon, saying its distinct sound contributed toward it being the franchise's "most terrifying" craft. io9 mocked the variety of TIE fighters in the franchise, listing four TIE models on its list of the eleven "silliest" Star Wars ships. Screen Rant called Andor's first-season depiction of TIE fighters more frightening than any of their original film trilogy appearances. The magazine went on to call the TIE Avenger in Andor's second season "cool" and "dangerous". Screen Rant called pirates' use of an unusual single-panel TIE in a Star Wars comic reflective of how the gang relies on Imperial discards to maintain their fleet.

== Barred Lenticular Galaxies ==
Certain Barred Lenticular Galaxies, such as NGC 936 in the constellation Whale (Cetus), are known to show remarkable shapes, very much resembling TIE fighters from Star Wars. Astronomers call NGC 936 Darth Vader's Galaxy and Darth Vader's Starfighter.
