= Star Wars Racer =

Star Wars Racer may refer to various video games based on the pod racing scene from the film Star Wars: Episode I – The Phantom Menace:

- Star Wars Episode I: Racer, 1999 home console
  - Star Wars Racer Revenge, 2002 sequel
- Star Wars: Racer Arcade, 2000 arcade racing game
