= Star Wars: Galactic Racer =

- Developer: Fuse Games
- Publisher: Secret Mode
- Director: Matt Webster
- Writers: Chris Remo; Duncan Fyfe
- Composer: Gordy Haab
- Series: Star Wars
- Engine: Unreal Engine 5
- Platforms: PlayStation 5; Windows; Xbox Series X/S
- Release: October 6, 2026
- Genre: Racing
- Modes: Single-player, multiplayer

Star Wars: Galactic Racer is a racing video game developed by Fuse Games and published by Secret Mode. Set in the Star Wars universe, the game explores the podracing scene following the fall of the Galactic Empire. It was released on October 6, 2026 for PlayStation 5, Windows and Xbox Series X/S, and received generally positive reviews from critics.

== Gameplay ==
In this screenshot, the player character is racing on Crait.

Star Wars: Galactic Racer consists of a single-player campaign and a multiplayer mode. In addition to the solo campaign, there is an arcade mode for quick, one-off races and a scenario mode that includes time trials and races with other objectives. The solo campaign is a roguelite, with the sequence of levels and story progression varying depending on playstyle and achievements. The difficulty in solo mode can be set or adjusted. In addition to the races, the single-player campaign includes elements off the track that can be controlled with the player character.

In the online multiplayer mode up to 12 players can participate in a race. A ranking system is planned for the multiplayer mode.

The game is set in the New Republic Era after the events of Return of the Jedi. Star Wars: Galactic Racer features racers from Star Wars: Episode I – The Phantom Menace, such as Ben Quadinaros and Sebulba.

It features multiple tracks on several Star Wars planets; locations include Tatooine, Lantaana, Jakku, Ando Prime and Sentinel One. According to the developers, there is no single ideal racing line on the tracks.

The selectable vehicle classes include podracers, landspeeders, speeder bikes, and a vehicle class introduced to the Star Wars universe with the game, called the skimspeeder. Vehicle building is another gameplay element. As the player progresses through the game, the vehicles can be increasingly customized.

== Plot ==
=== Setting ===
The races in the single-player campaign take place within the framework of the Galactic League, founded by the former podracer-mechanic Darius Pax and takes place in the lawless Outer Rim. The villainous racer Kestar Bool, who dominates the League, attempts to oust Pax from the racing business with the support of his clan. Pax seeks help from Shade, a mysterious loner among the racers with a personal grudge against the Bool family, to overthrow Kestar and regain control of the competition he created.

=== Synopsis ===
In the aftermath of the collapse of the Galactic Empire, Darius Pax takes the opportunity to create the Galactic Racing League to revive the sport after Imperial regulation nearly rendered it extinct. With the rarity of podracers though, the League instead focuses on landspeeders, speeder bikes, and skim speeders. However, the League's reigning champion, Kestar Bool, is attempting a hostile takeover using his father's connections and wealth. Wary of the threat Kestar poses to him, Pax attempts to hire a delivery pilot and former racer named Shade and their mechanic Hibi to defeat Kestar and strip his status as champion. While Shade is initially reluctant to return to racing, Pax eventually convinces them by reminding them of their grudge against Kestar and the Bool family. Shade takes part in an exhibition race on Jakku and defeats Kestar, with the latter accusing Shade of attempting to sabotage him. Incensed at Kestar's insults, Shade decides to formally join the Galactic League.

Shade soon begins making their way through the League tours until they reach their qualifying race on Derven Acos. However, Kestar has rigged what is normally a formality to a head to head race against the legendary veteran podracer Sebulba. Despite this, Shade is able to beat Sebulba in the race, garnering them a reputation as a racer with great potential. Sebulba then begins tagging along with the Galactic League, occasionally regaling Shade with his past exploits as a podracer. Hibi then asks about Shade's involvement with Kestar, and Shade reveals that Kestar and his family arranged for Shade to be sent to an Imperial prison after Shade accidentally damaged Kestar's speeder. Shade was incarcerated for three years until the Empire fell, and now wants to get payback. They eventually make their way to the championship race and defeat Kestar, but Kestar exposes the fact Pax violated League rules by personally recruiting Shade and ousts Pax to become the new League Commissioner. Pax is arrested by Kestar's henchmen and taken away, Shade is disqualified, and Kestar reveals he has acquired Sebulba's podracer and will be using it to defend his title in the next championship race.

Shade decides to keep racing because the only way to save Pax is to humiliate Kestar enough into leaving the League. However, Kestar's possession of a podracer gives him a significant advantage since they are superior in speed to conventional speeders. Sebulba then approaches Shade and offers to loan them his backup podracer, under the condition Shade let Sebulba buy their team since he wants to get his original podracer back from Kestar. Shade attempts a test run, but struggles to control it due to the human body's physical limitations. Hibi attempts to compensate by adding experimental stabilizers to assist Shade's piloting. In addition to normal races, Shade also begins taking private races against Sebulba's retired podracer friends in order to train.

Eventually, Shade works their way back to the championship race and faces off against Kestar in a podrace. Shade ultimately proves to be the victor, but Kestar uses a hidden bomb to destroy Shade's podracer and accuses Shade of planting it. However, the audience sees through Kestar's lie and continues to support Shade. Furious, Kestar shoots Shade in front of the entire audience, who become enraged at his unsportsmanlike conduct. Seeing the scandal, Kestar's father pulls his support for the League and Kestar is betrayed by his henchmen, who remove him from the stadium. Shade survives thanks to their league entry token blocking the blaster shot, and they become the new Galactic League champion. Afterwards, Sebulba and Hibi are appointed to become the new League Commissioners and they have ambitious plans to reform the League. Shade turns down the position, wanting to remain being a simple racer and leaves for the next race.

== Development ==
The game's developer, Fuse Games, based in Guildford, began work from its founding in 2023. Fuse was founded by senior developers from Criterion Games, the studio behind Need for Speed and Burnout. Fuse Games founder Matt Webster previously worked on Star Wars video games as an employee of Criterion, which included a collaboration with DICE on the development of Star Wars Battlefront and Battlefront II. As of 2026, Fuse Games employs approximately 75 developers. According to Webster, Lucasfilm Games had been involved in creative development decisions for the game from the beginning. In total, around 150 people were involved in the game's development.

Webster and his team observed that racing games had not evolved in terms of progression design over the previous two decades, instead sticking to the vehicle-collection principle popularized by Gran Turismo (i.e., race, earn money, buy a better car, repeat). By employing a roguelite approach—specifically, procedurally generated content—Fuse wanted to ensure the single-player campaign of Star Wars: Galactic Racer stands out from other racing games through greater variety and the resulting higher replay value.

Chris Remo and Duncan Fyfe were the game's lead writers. Remo previously worked with several of Fuse's former Criterion developers on Rogue One: X-Wing VR Mission for Battlefront.

The game was unveiled in December 2025 with a trailer at The Game Awards. Star Wars: Galactic Racer is the fifth Star Wars racing game, following Star Wars Episode I: Racer (1999), Star Wars: Racer Arcade (2000), Star Wars: Super Bombad Racing (2001), and Star Wars Racer Revenge (2002). It was released on October 6, 2026, for Windows, PlayStation 5, and Xbox Series X/S.

== Reception ==
Reception

Aggregate scores
| Aggregator | Score |
|---|---|
| Metacritic | PC: 85/100; PS5: 88/100; XSXS: 86/100 |
| OpenCritic | 97% recommend |

Review scores
| Publication | Score |
|---|---|
| Eurogamer | 5/5 |
| Game Informer | 8.5/10 |
| GameSpot | 9/10 |
| GamesRadar+ | 4/5 |
| IGN | 8/10 |
| PC Gamer (US) | 76/100 |
| Shacknews | 9/10 |

Star Wars: Galactic Racer received "generally favorable" reviews from critics, according to review aggregator Metacritic. It became the highest-rated Star Wars game on the site since Star Wars: Knights of the Old Republic (2003). OpenCritic determined that 97% of critics recommended the game.

One character, named Biddy Blas, who taunts the player in an obnoxious voice, has gained popularity among players online. Fans describe him as "the best Glup Shitto", an internet meme term referring to background characters, often with silly names. The voice actor for the character, Richard Summers-Calvert, has expressed that he is "overwhelmed and overstimulated" by how much the internet loves Biddy Blas. Lucasfilm Games executive producer Craig Derrick has also shared his appreciation for internet's love of the character.

In the United Kingdom, Star Wars: Galactic Racer debuted at number 2 on the physical sales chart for the week ending October 10. On Steam, the game regularly reached approximately 18,000 concurrent players through October. Fuse Games CEO Matt Webster described its sales figures as “healthy.” In November, the company revealed the game reached 1.5 million players. It is the third best-selling video game in the US in October 2026.

=== Awards ===
| Year | Award | Category | Result | Ref. |
|---|---|---|---|---|
| 2026 | Golden Joystick Awards | Ultimate Game of the Year | Nominated | |
| 2026 | Golden Joystick Awards | Best Audio Design | Nominated | |
| 2026 | The Game Awards 2026 | Best Sports/Racing Game | Pending | |
| 2026 | The Game Awards 2026 | Best Audio Design | Pending | |
