= Podracer =

Fictional vehicle type from the Star Wars universe

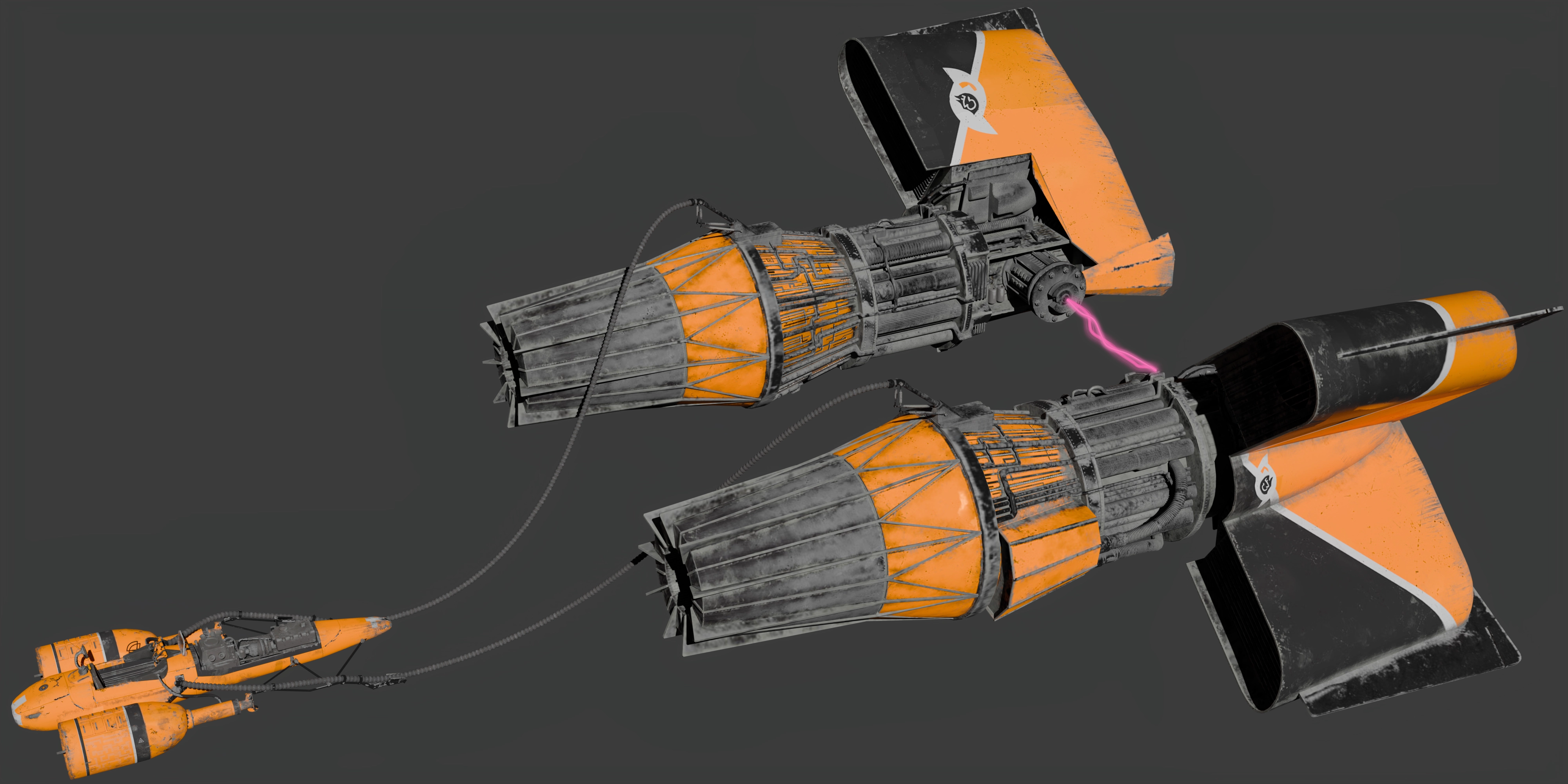
3D rendering of Sebulba's podracer

Podracers are high-speed one-man race craft which feature in the fictional Star Wars universe. Making their theatrical debut in Star Wars: Episode I – The Phantom Menace (1999), each podracer consists of jet engines attached via cables to a cockpit and held aloft by anti-gravity technology. The sport of podracing is considered very dangerous in the Star Wars universe, with Qui-Gon Jinn (Liam Neeson) remarking that a human would need "Jedi reflexes" to survive. At the midpoint of the film, Anakin Skywalker (Jake Lloyd) enters the Boonta Eve Classic, a major podracing event on the planet Tatooine.

The podracing scenes in The Phantom Menace have inspired many video games including Star Wars Episode I: Racer, Star Wars: Racer Arcade, Star Wars Racer Revenge, and Star Wars: Galactic Racer.

== Origin and design ==
Podracers were conceived of being like ancient chariots, only the horses are replaced with giant engines. Fifty-six separate scale models were built, ranging in size from thirty to sixty inches in length, but full-scale models were also constructed. These were primarily used as set dressing for scenes taking place in the podracer hanger, with the actual podracing handled via computer generated imagery.

== Depiction ==
Reference material traces the in-universe origin of podracing back to a daring mechanic named Phoebus who - inspired by primitive societies' use of animal-drawn carts for racing - decided to replicate the effect with advanced technology. Powerful jet engines, held in place by energy binders, are connected via Steelton control cables to an open-air cockpit or "pod" fitted with a complex engine sensor and telemetry computer package. Kept in the air with repulsorlift pads, these vehicles can achieve speeds of over 800 km/h (500 mph). Considered too much for humans to handle, the sport is dominated by other species with some sort of biological advantage, whether that be extra limbs or more durable bodies.

Many worlds have banned podracing due to its dangerous nature but the sport remains popular on Malastare and other planets, particularly in the Outer Rim. The largest of all podraces is the Boonta Eve Classic, where participation is decided by prior performance, the racers' popularity, and random selection. In a race known for showcasing experimental engines, determined racers, and underhanded tactics, Anakin's podracer is itself remarkable. Salvaging a pair of Radon-Ulzer 620C engines from Watto's junkyard, the young mechanic has heavily modified them - including a radical fuel atomizer and distribution system - for greater thrust and a top speed of almost 950 km/h (590 mph).

During the events of The Phantom Menace, Anakin offers to race in the Boonta Eve Classic so that Qui-Gon, Obi-Wan Kenobi (Ewan McGregor), and Padmé Amidala (Natalie Portman) can earn enough money to repair their starship. Anakin wins the race despite many challenges and earns not only the money but his own freedom. Of the eighteen racers who participate in the Boonta Eve Classic, just six actually cross the finish line, including the winner Anakin with a final time of 15:42.665.

== Cultural impact ==
Writing for The A.V. Club, Jarrod Jones says podracing not only represents director George Lucas' passion for racing, but his healthy fear of it too. A lifelong automotive enthusiast, a near-fatal car accident in 1962 gave Lucas a new appreciation for the effects of speed. Depictions of not only speed but the skill and precision needed to manage it featured in his earlier work before appearing in the Star Wars films. In this respect Jones says podracers represent "the ultimate form of racing" and the racing scenes in The Phantom Menace as the film's most transcendental.

Rafael Motamayor of /Film agrees the podracing scenes are one of the greatest sequences in the Star Wars films and representative of Lucas as a filmmaker and racing aficionado. However, he believes there is a sense of sadness there too, as if they are "a desperate plea from a young Lucas trying to come out of his commercial shell." He also notes a common criticism of the sequence: that its 15-minute runtime represents a significant detour from the main plot of the film.

== Bibliography ==
- Barr, Patricia; Bray, Adam; Jones, Matt; Horton, Cole; Wallace, Daniel; Windham, Ryder (2019). Ultimate Star Wars New Edition. United States: DK Publishing. ISBN 978-1-4654-7900-6.
- Dougherty, Kerrie; Fry, Jason; Hidalgo, Pablo; Reynolds, David West; Saxton, Curtis; Windham, Ryder (2020). Star Wars Complete Vehicles New Edition. United States: DK Publishing. ISBN 978-0-7440-2057-1.
- Lund, Kristin; Beecroft, Simon; Dougherty, Kerrie; Luceno, James; Fry, Jason (2016). Star Wars: Complete Locations. United States: DK Publishing. ISBN 978-1-4654-5272-6.
- Walker, Landry (2019). The Moviemaking Magic of Star Wars: Ships + Battles. United States: Abrams Books. pp. 54–55. ISBN 978-1-4197-3633-9.
