= List of Czech European Film Award winners and nominees =

This is a list of Czech European Film Award winners and nominees. This list details the performances of Czech actors, actresses, and films that have either been submitted or nominated for, or have won, a European Film Award.

== Main categories ==
Year	Award	Recipient	Status	Note
1996	Best Film	Kolya	Nominated	Czech-French-British co-production
1996	Best Film	Lea	Nominated	German-Czech co-production
2006	People's Choice Award for Best Film	Something Like Happiness	Nominated	Czech-German co-production
2006	People's Choice Award for Best Film	Oliver Twist	Nominated	British-Czech-French-Italian co-production
2007	Best Film	La Vie En Rose	Nominated	French-Czech-British co-production
2007	People's Choice Award for Best Film	I Served the King of England	Nominated	Czech-Slovak-German-Hungarian co-production
2009	People's Choice Award for Best Film	The Baader Meinhof Complex	Nominated	German-French-Czech co-production
2012	Best Animated Feature Film	Alois Nebel	Won	Czech-German co-production

== See also ==
- List of Czech submissions for the Academy Award for Best Foreign Language Film
