= María Sólrún Sigurðardóttir =

German film director and screenwriter

- Born: August 1, 1965 (age 60); Reykjavík, Iceland
- Other name: Maria Solrun
- Occupations: Writer, Director and Producer
- Years active: 1995–present

María Sólrún Sigurðardóttir (August 1, 1965 in Reykjavík, Iceland), also credited as Maria Solrun, is a German film director and screenwriter. She is best known for her work on the films Adam and Jargo.

== Life and career ==
María was born in Reykjavík, Iceland and graduated from the German Film and Television Academy Berlin (dffb).

María's debut feature film Jargo, starring Constantin von Jascheroff, Oktay Özdemir, premiered at the Berlin International Film Festival and won two awards at the Sarajevo Film Festival. In 2018, her second feature film Adam, starting Ivar Asgeirsson, Matthias Brenner, Floriane Daniel, premiered at the Berlin International Film Festival. She has worked as a screenwriter for several film production companies including Columbia Tristar, Sony Pictures, Studio Hamburg, X Filme and Boje Buck Productions. Since 2006 she has also been working as a film and television fiction consultant for the Icelandic Film Centre.

== Filmography ==
Year	Film	Writer	Director	Notes
2018	Adam	✓	✓	Feature Film
2014	Understand Women (Frauen verstehen)	✓	✗	TV movie
2010–2013	Love by the Fjord (Liebe am Fjord)	✓	✗	TV series
2012	Clinic at Alex (Klinik am Alex)	✓	✗	TV series
2006–2007	The Family Lawyer (Die Familienanwältin)	✓	✗	TV series
2006	My Adorable Nanny (Meine Bezaubernde Nanny)	✓	✗	TV movie
2004	Typical Man! (Typisch Mann!)	✓	✗	TV series
2004	Chaos Mum	✓	✗	TV series
2004	Jargo	✓	✓	Feature Film
2000	Ouch, You Happy One (Autsch, du Fröhliche)	✓	✗	TV movie
1998	A Dive Into the Earth's Crust	✓	✓	Documentary
1997	Underwater Iceland	✓	✗	Documentary
1995	Two Little Girls and a War	✓	✓	Short Film
