= 2004 Czech Lion Awards =

Czech film award ceremony

12th Czech Lion Awards
- Date: March 5, 2005
- Site: Lucerna, Prague
- Hosted by: Martin Zbrožek

Highlights
- Best Picture: Up and Down
- Best Actor: Yasha Kultiasov; King of Thieves
- Best Actress: Emília Vášáryová; Up and Down
- Best Supporting Actor: Jan Budař; Champions
- Best Supporting Actress: Klára Melíšková; Champions
- Most awards: King of Thieves (4); Up and Down (4)
- Most nominations: Up and Down (12)

Television coverage
- Network: Česká televize

2006 Czech Lion Awards ceremony was held on 5 March 2005.

== Winners and nominees ==
Best Film	Best Director
Up and Down	Jan Hřebejk – Jan Hřebejk
Best Actor in a Leading Role	Best Actress in a Leading Role
Yasha Kultiasov – King of Thieves	Emília Vášáryová – Up and Down
Best Actor in a Supporting Role	Best Actress in a Supporting Role
Jan Budař – Champions	Klára Melíšková – Champions
Best Screenplay	Design
Up and Down	Vaterland - A Hunting Logbook
Best Cinematography	Best Editing
King of Thieves	Champions
Music	Sound
King of Thieves	King of Thieves

=== Non-statutory Awards ===
Most Popular Film	Unique Contribution to Czech Film
Film Critics' Award	Best Foreign Film
Sazka Award for Unrealised Script	Best Film Poster
