= List of Star Wars air, aquatic, and ground vehicles =

The following is a list of fictional Star Wars terrestrial vehicles, including armored fighting vehicles, military aircraft, and naval ships.

The Star Wars universe showcases a diversity of vehicle types, many of which utilize fictitious technology. One of these, the repulsorlift, is an anti-gravity device that pushes against a planet's gravity to create lift. Vehicles which use repulsorlifts to hover and fly are known as 'repulsorcraft' or 'speeders' with further classifications including airspeeders, landspeeders, snowspeeders and speeder bikes. Traditional methods of locomotion like wheels and tracked treads still see use however as they are typically more durable and require less energy to operate. Walkers are a special type of ground vehicle which propel themselves on mechanical legs and are used as armored cavalry on the battlefield.

== Vehicles appearing in the Original Trilogy ==
=== All Terrain Armored Transport (AT-AT) ===
The All Terrain Armored Transport, or AT-AT walker, is a quadruped mechanized infantry combat vehicle used by the Imperial ground forces. Standing over 20 metres (66 ft) tall with blast-impervious armor plating, these massive constructs are used as much for psychological effect as they are for tactical advantage.

The AT-AT (pronounced either casually as 'at at', or using only the letters 'A.T. A.T.') was first introduced in The Empire Strikes Back (as the Galactic Empire's main units against Rebel Alliance infantry during the Battle of Hoth) and also appears in Return of the Jedi (as the vehicle used to transport Luke Skywalker and Darth Vader to their shuttle on the forest moon of Endor) and in Rogue One (in the AT-ACT variant, used to respond to the attacks of Rebel infantrymen of the Rogue One unit during the Battle of Scarif, although later defeated by the arriving Rebel Red Squadron of starfighers). The AT-AT also appears in a destroyed form in Star Wars: The Force Awakens, explained in the video game Star Wars Battlefront (2015) to be a residue of the Battle of Jakku, which was the Empire's last defeat and resulted in its dissolution. Modified forms appear in The Last Jedi (used by the First Order to attack Resistance forces in a former Rebel base).

=== All Terrain Scout Transport (AT-ST) ===
The All Terrain Scout Transport (AT-ST) is a two-legged mech walker introduced briefly in The Empire Strikes Back and featured extensively in Return of the Jedi. These vehicles were designed to screen and protect the flanks of slower moving AT-ATs and the larger tanks used by the Empire. Due to their design and movement, they are often dubbed as a "chicken walker". The name Scout Walker is also used to refer to an AT-ST. This name was used for the official toy instead of the AT-ST name.

An AT-ST also appears briefly in Rogue One: A Star Wars Story, patrolling Jedha City following an attack by Saw Gerrera's forces. A modified AT-ST later appears in The Mandalorian under the possession of a group of raiders, as the Empire has ceased to exist by the time of the series. An updated model of the AT-ST is used by the First Order in The Last Jedi. Shortly before the film's climax, an AT-ST is commandeered by BB-8.

=== Cloud car ===
Cloud cars fly around Bespin's Cloud City in The Empire Strikes Back and Return of the Jedi. Compositing the cloud cars into the original releases required multiple motion control passes to prevent the vehicles from standing out too distinctly from their cloudy background. Cloud cars were designed to have two cockpits that were interconnected with a small compartment block. It was often a red-orange color with each cockpit arranged in a "shoe-shape" with the glass being on the "tongue" of the cockpit. Like the rest of Cloud City, cloud cars were designed to reflect a more refined art deco style. The scale models originally created for the movies were made of plastic parts using the then-new method of vacuum forming. Cloud cars inserted into the films' Special Edition releases were computer-generated.

Within the Star Wars universe, these cloud cars (formally identified as Storm IV Twin-Pod models) were built by Bespin Motors specifically as atmospheric patrol craft. The unusual vehicles consist of two separate pods connected together, one for a pilot and the other for a gunner. It can achieve low orbit and attain speeds of 1,500 km/h (930 mph) thanks to a combination of repulsorlift drive and ion engine. Each pod is armed with a light blaster cannon and protected with armor plating and an armored canopy. While normally the port-side pod houses the pilot and starboard-side houses the gunner, both pods contain all the equipment necessary to fulfill either role in the event one is damaged.

=== Desert Skiff ===
A pair of skiffs travel with Jabba's sail barge in Return of the Jedi. The skiff was originally conceived as a flying animal carrying strapped-on passenger modules. It was modified to be a nautical-type vehicle, and then transitioned to become more utilitarian. A full-size skiff was built alongside the sail barge in Yuma. An 81-centimeter miniature was also built, and it was "crewed" by poseable puppets.

Skiffs are a common mode of transport on many Star Wars worlds as per in-universe sources, utilizing repulsorlift technology to move cargo and passengers on the cheap. The Bantha-II cargo skiffs seen in Return of the Jedi are also a favorite of various criminal organizations, which use them for raids and prisoner exchanges. Built by Ubrikkian Industries, they are 9.5 m (31 ft) long, with an armored bow to withstand head-on collisions, and can reach speeds of 250 km/h (160 mph).

=== Jabba's Sail Barge (Khetanna) ===
A sail barge delivers Jabba the Hutt and his entourage to the sarlacc pit in Return of the Jedi. Illustrator Ralph McQuarrie designed the ship to appear more utilitarian in comparison to early designs, which made the ship reminiscent of a Baroque sea craft. Joe Johnston continued working on the design after McQuarrie stepped away from the project. A 30,000-square-foot (2,800 m^{2}) full-scale sail barge set was erected in Yuma, Arizona; it was one of the largest Star Wars sets created. Measuring 150 feet long, 130 feet wide and 65 feet high, the sail barge set was supported by 130 wooden posts, each 27 feet high, which were deeply embedded into the ground. Underneath the barge were several offices and a commissary which could feed 150 people. In order to get to the set, a two-mile road made of compacted sand was built, requiring roughly 80,000 gallons of water to construct.

According to Star Wars references, Jabba's sail barge is named the Khetanna and was built by Ubrikkian Industries as a pleasure barge for the crime lord. At 30 m (98 ft) long, it is powered by a repulsorlift engine to reach a maximum speed of 100 km/h (62 mph) but can also use its two sails to slowly travel by air power. While designed purely as a pleasure barge, the Khetanna is fitted with a laser cannon turret and heavy blasters can be mounted on the railings.

=== Landspeeder ===
Landspeeders are antigravity vehicles that appear throughout the films and Expanded Universe in both civilian and military roles. They appear in Star Wars: Episode IV – A New Hope.

=== Sandcrawler ===
C-3PO (Anthony Daniels) and R2-D2 (Kenny Baker) are briefly held in a Jawa sandcrawler in Star Wars Episode IV: A New Hope. Shots of the sandcrawler at a distance were actually a matte painting; only two of its treads and a 27-meter-long piece of its lower structure were actually built. For shots involving the vehicle's movement, ILM used a 125-centimeter radio-controlled model. A computer-generated sandcrawler briefly appears in The Phantom Menace, and a sandcrawler also appears in Attack of the Clones. Sandcrawler-related merchandise include a Lego model, card game items, and Hasbro and Micro Machines toys.

=== Skyhopper ===
An Incom Corporation T-16 skyhopper appears in the background of the Lars residence in A New Hope, and Luke Skywalker (Mark Hamill) races a skyhopper in National Public Radio's radio adaptation of that movie; a skyhopper also appears at the end of the Special Edition release of Return of the Jedi. The skyhopper model that Skywalker handles in A New Hope is the concept model Colin Cantwell built; budget limitations allowed only a partial full-size mock-up of the craft to be built.

In Star Wars: Rebel Assault, skyhoppers are used by Rebel pilots to train in Tatooine's Beggar's canyon.

=== Snowspeeder (T-47 Airspeeder) ===
T-47 Airspeeder
- First appearance: The Empire Strikes Back
- Created by: Incom Corporation

Information
- Affiliation: Canon: Rebel Alliance; Legends: New Republic

General characteristics
- Class: Airspeeder
- Armaments: CEC Ap/11 laser cannons (2); Ubrikkian Mo/Dk power harpoon and tow cable
- Maximum speed: 1,100 km/h (680 mph)
- Length: 5.3 m (17 ft)
- Population volume: Pilot (1); Gunner (1)

A T-47 airspeeder, better known as "snowspeeder", is a Rebel Alliance vehicle featured in The Empire Strikes Back (1980) and several books, comics, and video games in the Star Wars Expanded Universe and also in Atari game cartridges in the 80's. Snowspeeder models and replicas have been merchandised by several companies.

Origin and design

During production of The Empire Strikes Back, designer Joe Johnston conceived a ship that combined the body of an X-wing and the cockpit of the Y-wing. However, this design was scrapped for the T-47, which featured no elements from previous craft. Johnston's designs for the Snowspeeders have influenced later Star Wars designers, such as Tommy Lee Edwards.

The models were built in three different scales by Steve Gawley, Charlie Bailey, and Mike Fulmer of ILM, with the smallest (20 inches) used for motion control photography, and the largest (2½ feet) for hero and pyrotechnic shots. All models included motor-controlled flaps to imply maneuverability, and the largest version also possessed motor-articulated crew Several full-scale props were built in London for the hangar, cockpit, and speeder crash scenes.

Depiction

According to background sources, the Rebel Alliance received a small squadron of modified T-47 airspeeders – aircraft which utilize repulsorlifts to achieve flight – shortly after establishing Echo Base on Hoth. These civilian speeders, originally meant for retrieving and hauling cargo sleds with their tow cables, were converted for military use by bolting on a pair of laser cannons with accompanying power converters and laser generator system. Additional armor plating was also added on to increase protection; this armor was originally carried by Y-wing starfighters but removed by Rebel technicians to ease maintenance. These modifications made the T-47 a highly maneuverable short-range attack craft which uses its speed and agility to avoid being hit. However, the intense environment of Hoth initially proved too hostile to these T-47s as the cold temperatures would cause their power generators to lock up. Only after Rebel mechanics modified the heat radiator fins at the back of the ships to make them less efficient was this problem resolved and they become more commonly known as snowspeeders.

In The Empire Strikes Back, Rogue Squadron, led by Commander Luke Skywalker (Mark Hamill), pilots snowspeeders against Imperial AT-AT walkers during the Battle of Hoth. However, when the snowspeeders' weaponry proves incapable of piercing the assault walkers' thick armoring, Luke devises the unconventional strategy of using their tow cables to entangle the AT-ATs. Although Luke's gunner, Dak Ralter, is killed before he can try the maneuver himself, Wedge Antilles and Wes Janson succeed in tripping up an AT-AT with their snowspeeder and destroying it with a well-placed shot to its neck. While ultimately the Rebels lose the Battle of Hoth, the snowspeeder earns an honored place in the history books for the role it played.

Merchandise

Kenner released a toy snowspeeder in 1980. Kenner re-released an updated version utilizing the same mold in 1995 for their new 'Power of the Force' line. After Hasbro shut down the Kenner offices in 1999, it was released several times under Hasbro's brand name: in 2001 as a Wal-Mart exclusive in the "Power of the Jedi" collection, in 2006 as a Target exclusive in the "Saga Collection" line, and three versions of it in the 2010 "The Vintage Collection", including a Target exclusive packaged as the original 1980 Kenner version.

LEGO has also sold snowspeeder models, and Snowspeeder models used in The Empire Strikes Back have been sold online.

Hasbro's Star Wars Transformers line included a Snowspeeder that transformed into Luke Skywalker.

In 2009, Japanese model manufacturer Fine Molds released a 1/48 scale kit of the Snowspeeder.

=== Speeder bike ===
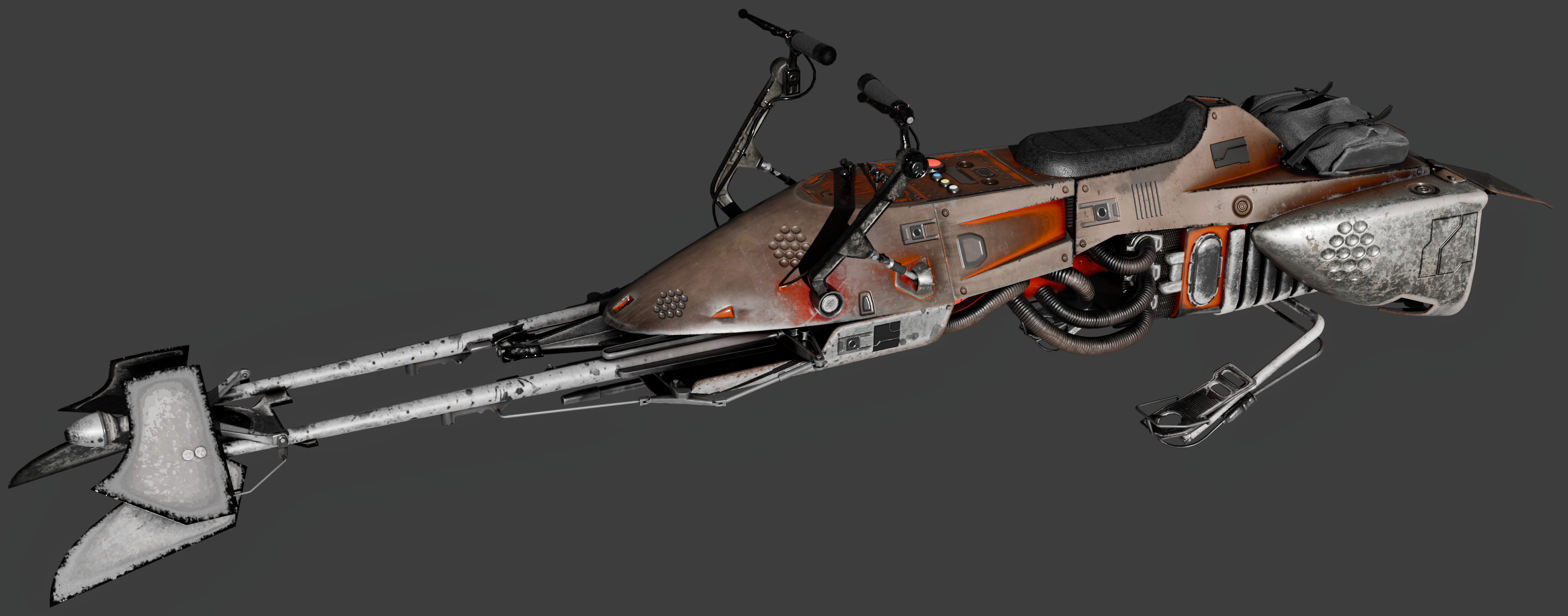
Speeder bike rendering from Star Wars

Speeder bikes first appear in a chase scene in Return of the Jedi and have appeared in various other Star Wars media. Related vehicles called 'swoop bikes' have also appeared in Star Wars films and other media.

== Vehicles appearing in the Prequel Trilogy ==
=== Armored Assault Tank (AAT) ===
The AAT is a Trade Federation vehicle that appears in The Phantom Menace, Revenge of the Sith, and other Star Wars media. Early drafts of The Phantom Menace described the Trade Federation's invasion of Naboo being led by "armored attack craft" that resembled helicopters. George Lucas narrowed down the AAT's design after looking at two different drawings from ILM design director Doug Chiang - one tank-like and the other shaped like a flying spade - and deciding it would be interesting to combine the two together. The final version's forward curve is based on the curve of a shovel, and parts of it are intended to suggest animalistic traits. LEGO released an AAT model in 2001.

In-universe reference material describes the AAT as a battle tank designed specifically for head-on combat, with a very heavily armored front and a nose of almost solid armor so it can crash through heavy walls. First manufactured for the Trade Federation by the Baktoid Armor Workshop, the AAT floats above the ground thanks to anti-gravity "repulsorlift" technology and can achieve a top speed of 55 km/h (34 mph). At 9.75 m (32.0 ft) long, the AAT is crewed by four battle droids: a commander, a pilot and two gunners. Up to six additional battle droids can use handholds on either side of the tank's body to ride into battle. It is heavily armed with a primary turret-mounted heavy laser cannon; matching pairs of anti-personnel laser cannons and laser rangefinders which extend out either side on stalks; and two forward-facing short-ranged blaster cannons in the tank's main body. The base of the tank also incorporates six energized projectile launchers which carry three main ammunition types: "bunker-buster" high explosive shells, armor-piercing shells and high-energy shells. When fired, these shells are cocooned in high-energy plasma which reduces air friction and improves penetration. In order to reload the launchers though, the entire "foot" of the AAT must be removed and a loaded replacement installed using mechanical facilities.

=== Bongo Submarine ===
The Gungan "bongo" submarine is a transport in The Phantom Menace. Obi-Wan Kenobi (Ewan McGregor), Qui-Gon Jinn (Liam Neeson), and Jar Jar Binks (Ahmed Best) use a bongo to travel from the underwater city of Otah Gunga to the Naboo capital of Theed.

Industrial Light & Magic's Doug Chiang devised the submarine's squid-like propeller design. This assembly was then merged with the design for a manta-shaped underwater transport written out of an earlier draft of the story. This design replaced earlier concepts that depicted the Gungan vessel as an organic-looking diving bell. Practical and CGI models of the Gungan vessel were built, as well as a full-size set for the actors to work in.

Within the Star Wars universe, the Bongo is described as being organically grown by secret Gungan techniques and so no two are exactly alike. The submersible piloted by Jar-Jar, Obi-Wan and Qua-Gon was a Tribubble bongo 15 m (49 ft) long and manufactured by the Otoh Gunga Bongmeken Cooperative. It used hydrostatic bubble shields to keep the cockpit and cargo areas dry and filled with air. The cluster of semi-rigid electromotive tentacles at the submersible's rear could propel it to a top speed of 85 km/h (53 mph). It was unarmed but in an emergency the cockpit section could detach from the rest of the submersible as an escape pod.

=== Clone turbo tank (HAVw A6 Juggernaut) ===
The turbo tank is a ten-wheeled battle tank and armored personnel carrier that appears in Revenge of the Sith and is based on designs done by Joe Johnston for use in The Empire Strikes Back. West End Games based their "HAVw A5 Juggernaut" design on Johnson's sketches. The larger, more heavily armed vehicle that appears in Revenge of the Sith is labeled "HAVw A6".

The clone turbo tank, more formally the HAVw A6 Juggernaut, is described in Star Wars sources as being built by Kuat Drive Yards to serve as a heavily armed and armored military transport for the Republic during the Clone Wars. Measuring 49.4 m (162 ft) long, 19.6 m (64 ft) wide and 30.4 m (100 ft) high, the massive tank can carry as many as 300 clone troopers into battle depending on internal configuration. Each of the Juggernaut's ten wheels consists of three independently spinning segments and utilize independent suspension to travel across nearly any terrain. Designed to absorb enemy fire, they help the tank achieve a maximum speed of 160 km/h (99 mph). A crew of 12 operates the Juggernaut and can control it from cockpits located at either end of the tank. The Juggernaut's nearly impregnable armor plating is thermally superconductive to absorb and spread heat over a wider area. For weaponry it is equipped with a heavy laser cannon turret and rapid-repeating heavy laser cannon turret on the roof; two side-mounted medium antipersonnel laser cannons that extend out from either side of the hull; two twin antipersonnel blaster cannons under the 'forward' cockpit; and two retractable rocket/grenade launchers.

After the end of the Clone Wars, the tank continues to serve the Galactic Empire. A later model, the HCVw A9, appears in Rogue One: A Star Wars Story being used as a prisoner transport carrying Jyn Erso (Felicity Jones).

=== Corporate Alliance tank droid ===
Corporate Alliance tank droids appear in Revenge of the Sith and have appeared in other Star Wars media, including as playable vehicles in Battlefront II. This "snail droid" was originally designed for Star Wars: Episode II – Attack of the Clones for the climactic Battle of Geonosis, but they did not make it into the final cut of the film.

Formally identified in background material as the NR-N99 Persuader-class droid enforcer, these tanks are manufactured by the Techno Union and primarily used by the Corporate Alliance, which sides with the Separatists during the Clone Wars. This 10.9 m (36 ft)-long tank is designed to function on its own with a built-in droid brain, though it can also be controlled by a pilot battle droid. Consisting of a huge central tread and forward-mounted outriggers, the tank droid can cross almost any terrain with ease and achieve a top speed of 60 km/h (37 mph). Its weaponry includes two heavy repeating blasters, two ion cannons, and missile launchers.

=== Dwarf spider droid ===
The Dwarf spider droid is first seen being used by the Confederacy of Independent Systems in Attack of the Clones during the Battle of Geonosis and have featured in other Star Wars media. Hasbro released a spider droid figure in 2003.

The DSD1 dwarf spider droid, as it is identified in background material, is essentially a walking cannon with a droid brain, built by the Baktoid Armor Workshop to fight for the Separatists during the Clone Wars. Standing only 1.9 m (6 ft 3 in) tall, it is also known as the burrowing spider droid for its ability to fit in tight spaces. Its primary weapon is a long blaster cannon capable of firing at different intensities and rates of fire, though it can also willingly utilize a self-destruct device to blow up the enemy. A pair of infrared photoreceptors on the armored brain casing allow the spider droid to see its surroundings while four articulated legs are designed to affix to the sides of cliffs so it may climb difficult terrain. It can achieve a maximum speed of 90 km/h (56 mph).

=== HMP Droid gunship ===
Droid gunships appear at the Battle of Kashyyyk in Revenge of the Sith and Star Wars: Battlefront II. Their circular shape is designed to be reminiscent of the Trade Federation ships seen in The Phantom Menace. These ships were originally intended to appear in the movie's opening space battle, but were ultimately depicted as aircraft.

Described by in-universe material as the Separatist counterpart to the Republic's LAAT, the Heavy Missile Platform droid gunship (or HMP Predator) is a heavily armed repulsorlift airspeeder which can be adapted for a wide range of mission profiles. Mass-produced by Baktoid Fleet Ordnance on numerous worlds, the HMP is controlled by an advanced droid brain and measures 12.4 m (41 ft) long, 11 m (36 ft) wide and 3.1 m (10 ft) high. The gunship possesses a top speed of 600 km/h (370 mph). However it is considered relatively slow and with average maneuverability, compensated for by its ability to unleash incredible firepower and strong deflector shields. Its weaponry can be changed out depending on what's needed, but standard armament includes a chin-mounted medium laser cannon, two twin laser cannon turrets, wingtip-mounted light laser cannons, and fourteen missiles fitted with variable payloads including high explosive, EMP, incendiary and hard radiation. The gunship can also be modified to serve as a troop carrier for battle droids.

=== Flash speeder ===
The Naboo Royal Security Forces use Flash speeders in The Phantom Menace.

=== Gian speeder ===
The Naboo Royal Security Forces use Gian speeders in The Phantom Menace. They are larger, heavier counterparts to the NRSF Flash Speeders, and are used mainly for skirmishes against pirates and smugglers. However, they are still modified civilian landspeeeders, and prove relatively useless against Trade Federation tanks. They are painted purple, carry one medium blaster cannon, and have seating for four NRSF officers. They also have light armor plating for protection against hand-held blasters, but there is little protection for the vehicles occupants.

=== Hailfire droid tank ===
Hailfire droids are mobile missile platforms that appear in Attack of the Clones during the Battle of Geonosis and have featured in other Star Wars media associated with the Clone Wars. In-universe material identifies them as IG-227 Hailfire-class droid tanks produced by Haor Chall Engineering and commissioned for the InterGalactic Banking Clan prior to the Clone Wars to assist with debt collection. Standing 6.8 m (22 ft) tall and capable of 45 km/h (28 mph), they consist of two large wheels with a low-fixed base on which is mounted a targeting photoreceptor, twin chin-mounted blaster cannons, and two missile launchers. Each launcher can carry up to 15 missiles, which have an effective range of less than one kilometer following deliberately evasive trajectories to their target. Although an effective platform against both ground and air targets, the Hailfire was phased out during the Clone Wars because of its limited ammunition supply.

Joe Pappalardo of Popular Mechanics, in analyzing several different Star Wars vehicles, gave a mixed review of the Hailfire droid. He praised it for being a wheeled vehicle instead of a walking vehicle and noted that having the robot body suspended between wheels is a popular real-world design which allows robots to right themselves. However he argues the design's wheel size is too big for effectively traversing large obstacles, citing research done by Caltech and NASA on the issue. He also criticized the negative camber of the wheels for having no discernable purpose.

=== Homing spider droid ===
The OG-9 homing spider droid appears in Attack of the Clones during the Battle of Geonosis and features in other Star Wars media, including as a playable vehicle in Battlefront II. During post-production, the droid was referred to as "Commerce Guild droid B." Referred to in source material as the OG-9 homing spider droid, these droid walking tanks were manufactured by Baktoid Armor Workshop for the Commerce Guild to enforce their contracts. It consists of an armored reactor core body attached to four armored legs, giving it a height of 7.3 m (24 ft). While the legs are thin they are tougher than they look, allowing the droid to traverse nearly any terrain and achieve a top speed of 90 km/h (56 mph). Its primary weapons are two dish-shaped laser cannons mounted on the top and bottom of the reactor core: the top-mounted cannon primarily releases sustains bursts to wear down deflector shields, while the bottom cannon suppresses enemy infantry.

Joe Pappalardo of Popular Mechanics praised the design of the Homing spider droid for mirroring the design of a real-world robot, RoboSimian, designed by JPL for traversing rough terrain. However he criticized it's apparent slow speed during the final battle in Attack of the Clones and argues that destroying one of its legs would quickly knock the robot out of a fight.

=== Multi-troop transport (MTT) ===
The Multi-Troop Transports or MTTs made their first appearance in The Phantom Menace, carrying and deploying Trade Federation battle droids during the invasion of Naboo. As with the AAT, parts of the MTT are intended to suggest animalistic traits. Lucas requested the MTT have locomotive-type qualities and be capable of knocking down everything in its path; consequently, the MTT has battering rams and locomotive components. Although the MTT was primarily created using computer-generated imagery (CGI), a scale model was also built to film certain scenes of The Phantom Menace, combining elements of practical and digital special effects.

Fictional background for the MTT explains it was originally produced by Baktoid Armor Workshop, the same manufacturer of the Trade Federation's AAT. Measuring 31 m (102 ft) long and 3 m (9.8 ft) tall, the MTT is designed to deploy in traditional battle lines, hence its strong frontal armor. Although floating above the ground on heavy-duty "repulsorlift" engines, the MTT is a lumbering vehicle with a top speed of only 35 km/h (22 mph). A crew of five battle droids operate the MTT and it is armed with a pair of twin 17kv antipersonnel blaster cannons, but its primary purpose is to carry 112 battle droids into battle. These are stored folded-up on an articulated deployment rack, which extends forward out of the MTT's bulbous front end via troop deployment hatch. During the Clone Wars, MTTS were modified to carry larger Super Battle Droids as well.

=== Podracer ===
Podracers are high-speed one-man race craft which feature in the fictional Star Wars universe. Making their theatrical debut in Star Wars: Episode I – The Phantom Menace (1999), each podracer consists of jet engines attached via cables to a cockpit and held aloft by anti-gravity technology. The sport of podracing is considered very dangerous in the Star Wars universe, with Qui-Gon Jinn (Liam Neeson) remarking that a human would need "Jedi reflexes" to survive. At the midpoint of the film, Anakin Skywalker (Jake Lloyd) enters the Boonta Eve Classic, a major podracing event on the planet Tatooine. The podracing scenes in The Phantom Menace have inspired many video games including Star Wars Episode I: Racer, Star Wars: Racer Arcade, Star Wars Racer Revenge, and Star Wars: Galactic Racer.

=== Republic assault gunboat ===
The Republic assault gunboat appears in Revenge of the Sith. The vehicle went through several changes over the course of its development: it was originally a Confederacy capital ship, then became the "Good Guy A" support ship for the Republic. It became a Confederacy ship once more before being scaled down, turned into a speeder, and becoming a Republic craft.

=== Republic LAAT Gunship ===
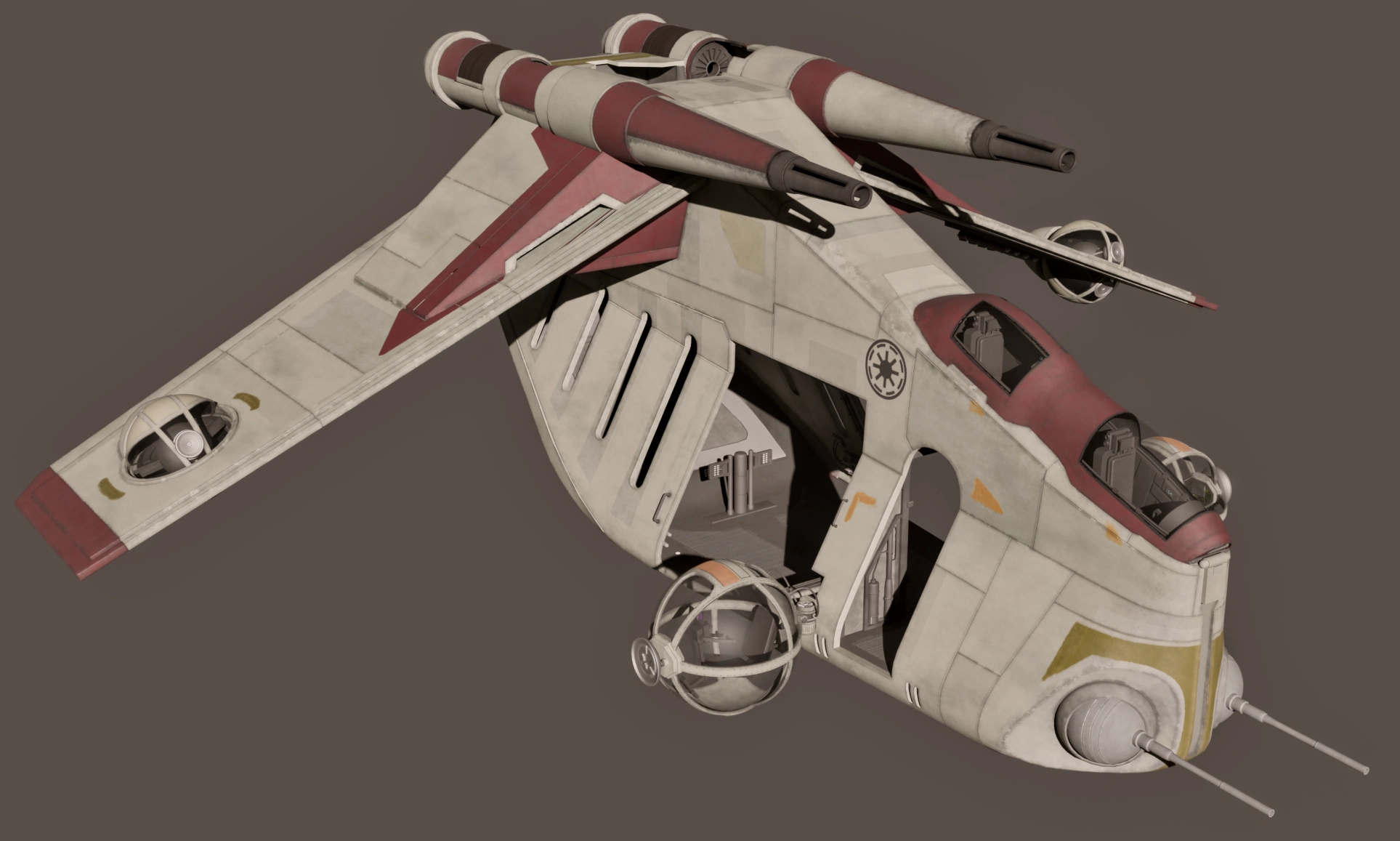
LAAT gunship

The Low-Altitude Assault Transports (LAATs) are Galactic Republic airborne attack transport and multirole-ground attack gunships that appears in Attack of the Clones, Revenge of the Sith, Star Wars: The Clone Wars, Star Wars: Battlefront, and Star Wars: Republic Commando, ferrying clone troopers, Jedi, and military hardware during battle. The Expanded Universe describes the LAAT as a versatile multi-role aerospace crafts capable of reconfigured for the gunship, transport, starfighter, and bomber combat roles. There are numerous LAAT variants: the LAAT/i infantry transport, the LAAT/c cargo carrier, the LAAT/s stealth special forces, the LAAT/le law enforcement for military police, and LAAT/v vehicle tactical airlift that carried AT-TEs.

Lucas turned to footage of helicopter-troop deployment when conceiving the LAAT; the vehicle was originally labeled the "Jedi attack helicopter", a versatile gunship platform combining the functions of a black hawk a chinook and an Apache. The vehicle's ultimate appearance is based on the Russian Mil Mi-24 helicopter. The craft's engine sounds are the modified sound of a Vickers Vimy, a World War I bomber. Both Hasbro and Lego released LAAT models in 2002; Lego released another LAAT in 2008. Code 3 Collectibles released a die-cast gunship two years later.

Within the Star Wars universe, these repulsorlift gunships were built by Rothana Heavy Engineering to serve a vital role as atmospheric transports and escorts for the Republic during the Clone Wars. The standard LAAT/i gunship (Low Altitude Assault Transport/infantry), measuring 17.4 m (57 ft) long (clearance with guns) and 6.1 m (20 ft) deep with a 17 m (56 ft) wingspan, can carry a platoon of 30 clone troopers with storage racks for several speeder bikes. With a maximum air speed of 620 km/h (390 mph), the LAAT was designed specifically with low-atmosphere flight in mind, giving it an advantage engaging enemy starfighters which give up their speed advantage when fighting below mountain level. Later models however were adapted to allow short trips in deep space. The gunship's weaponry includes three antipersonnel laser cannons on swivel turrets, two forward and one rear; four composite-beam laser turrets, two mounted on the wings and two on ball turrets extending from either side; two mass driver missile launchers which can accelerate a variety of missiles at up to hypersonic velocities; and eight light air-to-air rockets carried on underwing hardpoints. The LAAT/i is crewed by a pilot, copilot/gunner, and two auxiliary turret gunners. It also carries a variety of emergency supplies, including an IM-6 Battlefield Medical Droid, collapsible repulsor stretchers, and inflatable decontamination tents.

Another variant, the LAAT/c (Low Altitude Assault Transport/carrier), is crewed by a single pilot and armed with just the nose-mounted cannons, but features a pair of magnetic clamps that can quickly ferry cargo or AT-TEs into battle.

In a comparison of fictional dropships, Jae Callisto of Comic Book Resources called the LAAT the most powerful and versatile of those to feature in video games, highlighting its ability to mow down enemy forces before deploying its carried troops.

=== Self-propelled heavy artillery (SPHA) ===
Self-propelled heavy artillery first appear in Attack of the Clones during the Battle of Geonosis. The vehicle was initially designed on treads, but George Lucas suggested that it be equipped with legs like the AT-TEs that fight alongside it. The SPHA was referred to as "Clone Tank A" during production. Source material identifies the SPHA as one of the biggest ground guns in the Republic's arsenals during the Clone Wars, operated by a crew of 30 clone troopers. At 140.2 m (460 ft) long, the SPHA is slow but steady, reaching speeds of up to 35 km/h (22 mph) on 12 articulate legs though it must remain stationary to fire its weapon. The SPHA-T is armed with a heavy turbolaser cannon powerful enough to destroy a starship, though firing it requires vast amounts of energy which can quickly drain the SPHA-T.

Joe Pappalardo of Popular Mechanics has criticized the design of the SPHA for using legs compared to wheels or treads which would be easier to maintain.

=== Single Trooper Aerial Platform (STAP) ===
STAPs, which first appeared in The Phantom Menace and have featured in other Star Wars media, are designed to appear reminiscent of the speeder bikes seen in Return of the Jedi. The STAP's design also relates back to Lucas' 1973 idea of ridable "jet-sticks" which appeared in early drafts of the original Star Wars movie. A draft of The Phantom Menace refers to the vehicles as STAPS, or Single Troop Armed Pogo Sticks.

These lightweight reconnaissance vehicles are based in-universe on civilian vehicles called airhooks, modified for greater performance and to be piloted by the Trade Federation's battle droids. Floating above the ground thanks to "repulsorlift" technology, a pair of drive turbines on either side of the vertical stem gives it impressive speed and maneuverability. Though armed with a pair of blaster cannons, the STAP leaves its pilot completely exposed, making it ill-suit for heavy battle.

=== Swamp speeder ===
Swamp speeders appear in Revenge of the Sith during battle scenes on Felucia and Kashyyyk. TJ Frame, who worked on the swamp speeder concept soon after joining the art department, initially designed the craft to be appear reminiscent of fanboats. Within the Star Wars universe these vehicles are known as Infantry Support Platform (ISP) speeders, built for the Republic during the Clone Wars by Uulshos Manufacturing. ISPs use repulsorlifts and a powerful turbofan to patrol swampy regions, leading to their nickname, although they can be used on almost any terrain. Operated by two clone troopers and armed with a pair of twin swiveling blaster cannons, the ISP can move at speeds of up to 100 km/h (62 mph).

=== Wheel bike ===
General Grievous rides a wheel bike in Revenge of the Sith during his confrontation with Obi-Wan Kenobi (Ewan McGregor). Grievous' vehicle is similar to another wheel bike that appears in the Star Wars: Droids cartoon. One concept for Grievous' vehicle was for it to include "tank-like chariots"; at another point, the vehicle was going to be another droid.

Grievous' wheel bike is identified in Star Wars source material as a TSMEU-6 personal wheel bike built by the Z-Gomot Ternbuell Guppat Corporation. Wheel bikes are described as being primarily used during mining operations, however they are also popular as modified weapons platforms on the second-hand market. The TSMEU-6 is 3.5 m (11 ft) long with a wheel diameter of 2.5 m (8 ft 2 in) and four retractable legs for navigating difficult terrain. With the legs retracted the wheel bike has a maximum speed of 330 km/h (210 mph), while in walking mode the bike can only attain 10 km/h (6.2 mph). Overall the bike has enough fuel to travel 500 km (310 mi). While normally carrying a driver and passenger, Grievous' bike has had the passenger seat replaced with a heavy double laser cannon; both seat and cannon remain stable while the wheel rotates around them.

=== Wookiee flying catamaran ===
Wookiee flying catamarans appear in Revenge of the Sith. They were originally conceived as strictly water vehicles. The addition of a rotor came late in production; some printed works do not depict this component.

=== Wookiee ornithopter ===
Wookiee ornithopters appear in Revenge of the Sith. The craft was originally known as the "dragonfly helicopter". Although mostly depicted through computer-generated imagery, a full-size mockup of the gunner's seat was created for a closeup of the tail gunner.

== Vehicles appearing in the Sequel Trilogy ==
=== All Terrain MegaCaliber Six (AT-M6) ===
The All Terrain MegaCaliber Six, or AT-M6 walker, is a mobile siege engine utilized by the First Order in their attempt to reconquer the galaxy. Built around a massive turbolaser cannon carried on its back, this simian-shaped walker combines equal parts devastating firepower and psychological warfare. These walkers made their theatrical appearance in Star Wars: The Last Jedi (2017) as the First Order attempted to wipe out the Resistance in the Battle of Crait, and have appeared in other multimedia related to the sequel trilogy.

=== Ski Speeder ===
The Ski Speeder makes it theatrical debut in Star Wars: The Last Jedi (2017) as the Resistance uses several of these vehicles to defend their base on Crait in the film's climactic battle. They were created by production designer Kevin Jenkins, with full-size sets built to film the actors piloting them. The vehicles' unsightly appearance is meant to represent the Resistance's situation - ugly and outdated weapons of last resort - but the addition of the stabilizing ski foot with Crait's red crystalline surface creates beauty in their movements.

These vehicles are identified within the Star Wars universe as V-4X-D ski speeders originally built by Roche Machines for use in asteroid slalom racing, a sport that involves competitors racing along and between asteroids with sufficient gravity for repulsorlifts to engage. However, the sport quickly lost its appeal after an incident saw several racers devoured live on-air by stone-mites. Roche Machines was forced to sell much of their remaining inventory at reduced prices, with some finding their way to the Rebel Alliance. These speeders, measuring 7.33 m (24.0 ft) long and 11.5 m (38 ft) wide with room for a single pilot, were modified by Rebel technicians to carry two medium laser cannons in place of the boom-mounted holo-cameras and as much armoring as possible. A contingent of modified ski speeders were stored on Crait but abandoned along with the base, where the desperate Resistance would deploy them as their last line of defense.

== Vehicles appearing in other Star Wars media ==
=== Imperial Assault Tank ===
The Imperial Assault Tank is a ground vehicle which made its theatrical debut in Rogue One: A Star Wars Story patrolling the streets of Jedha's Old City and has appeared in other media including Star Wars Rebels. The life-sized model which appeared on the Rogue One set was based on a heavily modified flatbed Alvis Stormer piloted by experienced tank operators. Although the tank had initially been intended to be a hover vehicle, it was decided to keep the treads after production.

Official sources identify the vehicle as the TX-225 "Occupier" combat assault tank manufactured by Rothana Heavy Engineering for the Galactic Empire. Measuring 7.3 m (24 ft) long and 1.82 m (6 ft 0 in) high, this ground assault vehicle (GAV) can reach a top speed of 72 km/h (45 mph) on open roads and is crewed by a tank commander, driver, and gunner/technician. Its armament includes a pair of elevating twin Dymek Mk2e/w medium laser cannons for antiarmor & antiaircraft use and a forward-locked twin Dymek MK 2e/w medium laser cannon for antipersonnel use. Composite laminate armoring makes the tank remarkably resilient without overtaxing its propulsion system. Two variants of the "Occupier" are employed by the Empire: the standard TX-225 GAVw utilizing a continuous track which makes it highly maneuverable in urban environments, and the TX-225 GAVr which hovers slightly above the ground on repulsorlifts.

=== Imperial Troop Transport ===
The Imperial Trooper Transport is a vehicle which made its television debut in Star Wars Rebels and has appeared in other Star Wars media including The Mandalorian. According to official sources, the K79-S80 Imperial Troop Transport (ITT) is an armored troop transport which uses repulsorlift technology to deliver Stormtroopers into battle. Manufactured by Ubrikkian Industries, the ITT measures 8.7 m (29 ft) long and can achieve a top speed of 150 km/h (93 mph). Although not designed specifically for combat, the ITT is armed with two forward-facing laser guns and a roof-mounted twin laser turret to defend itself. In addition to carrying troops the ITT is also used to ferry supplies or prisoners between locations; the cargo racks on either side of the ITT double as holding compartments for publicly displaying prisoners as a warning to others.

== Bibliography ==
- Barr, Tricia; Bray, Adam; Horton, Cole; Horton (2017). Star Wars: The Visual Encyclopedia. United States: DK Publishing. ISBN 978-1-4654-5962-6.
- Barr, Patricia; Bray, Adam; Jones, Matt; Horton, Cole; Wallace, Daniel; Windham, Ryder (2019). Ultimate Star Wars New Edition. United States: DK Publishing. ISBN 978-1-4654-7900-6.
- Dougherty, Kerrie; Fry, Jason; Hidalgo, Pablo; Reynolds, David West; Saxton, Curtis; Windham, Ryder (2020). Star Wars Complete Vehicles New Edition. United States: DK Publishing. ISBN 978-0-7440-2057-1.
- Luceno, James; Reynolds, David West; Windham, Ryder; Fry, Jason; Hidalgo, Pablo (2018). Star Wars: The Complete Visual Dictionary. United States: DK Publishing. ISBN 978-1-4654-7547-3.
- Lund, Kristin; Beecroft, Simon; Dougherty, Kerrie; Luceno, James; Fry, Jason (2016). Star Wars: Complete Locations. United States: DK Publishing. ISBN 978-1-4654-5272-6.
- Walker, Landry Q. (2018). Star Wars Encyclopedia of Starfighters and Other Vehicles. United States: DK Publishing. ISBN 9781465482716.
- Walker, Landry (2019). The Moviemaking Magic of Star Wars: Ships + Battles. United States: Abrams Books. pp. 54–55. ISBN 978-1-4197-3633-9.
- Windham, Ryder (2019). Star Wars Rebel Starfighters Owner's Workshop Manual. United States: Insight Editions. ISBN 978-1-68383-936-1.
