= 9th European Film Awards =

1996 film awards ceremony in Germany

- Date: 8 November 1996
- Site: Blaues Zelt am Lützowplatz, Berlin, Germany
- Hosted by: N/A
- Organized by: European Film Academy

Highlights
- Best Film: Breaking the Waves
- Best Actor: Ian McKellen
- Best Actress: Emily Watson

The 9th European Film Awards were presented on 8 November 1996 in Berlin, Germany.

== Awards ==
=== Best Film ===
English title	Original title	Director(s)	Country
Breaking the Waves		Lars von Trier	Denmark
Kolya	Kolja	Jan Svěrák	Czech Republic
Secrets & Lies		Mike Leigh	United Kingdom
Lea	Lea	Ivan Fila	Germany
Some Mother's Son		Terry George	Ireland

=== Lifetime Achievement Award ===
Recipient	Occupation
(United Kingdom) Alec Guinness	actor
