= Jargo =

- Directed by: Maria Solrun
- Written by: Maria Solrun
- Produced by: Katrin Schlösser; Frank Löprich
- Starring: Constantin von Jascheroff; Oktay Özdemir; Nora Waldstätten; Udo Kier; Josefine Preuß; Yunus Emre Budak
- Cinematography: Birgit Guðjónsdóttir
- Edited by: Uta Schmidt
- Music by: Henning Rabe; Christine Aufderhaar
- Distributed by: Picture This! Entertainment
- Release date: 2004
- Running time: 90 minutes
- Countries: Iceland; Germany
- Language: German

Jargo is a 2004 coming of age film about a young man who experiences culture shock from moving from Saudi Arabia to Germany. The film premiered at the Berlin International Film Festival and won two awards at the Sarajevo Film Festival. It was directed by Maria Solrun.

== Plot ==
The film is about a young man, Jargo (Constantin von Jascheroff), who is of German descent but has resided in Saudi Arabia with his parents. After his father (Udo Kier) commits suicide, Jargo and his mother move to Berlin. Jargo experiences culture shock, as he is alienated from German culture. He meets a similar aged companion, Kamil (Oktay Özdemir), a working-class youth of Turkish origin. Kamil is a petty criminal, who attracts Jargo, upon whom he comes to have a significant influence. Kamil is passionately in love with his substance-abusive girlfriend, played by Nora Waldstätten, whose fickleness and instability eventually lead to a crisis between Jargo and Kamil.
