= Birgit Guðjónsdóttir =

Icelandic cinematographer

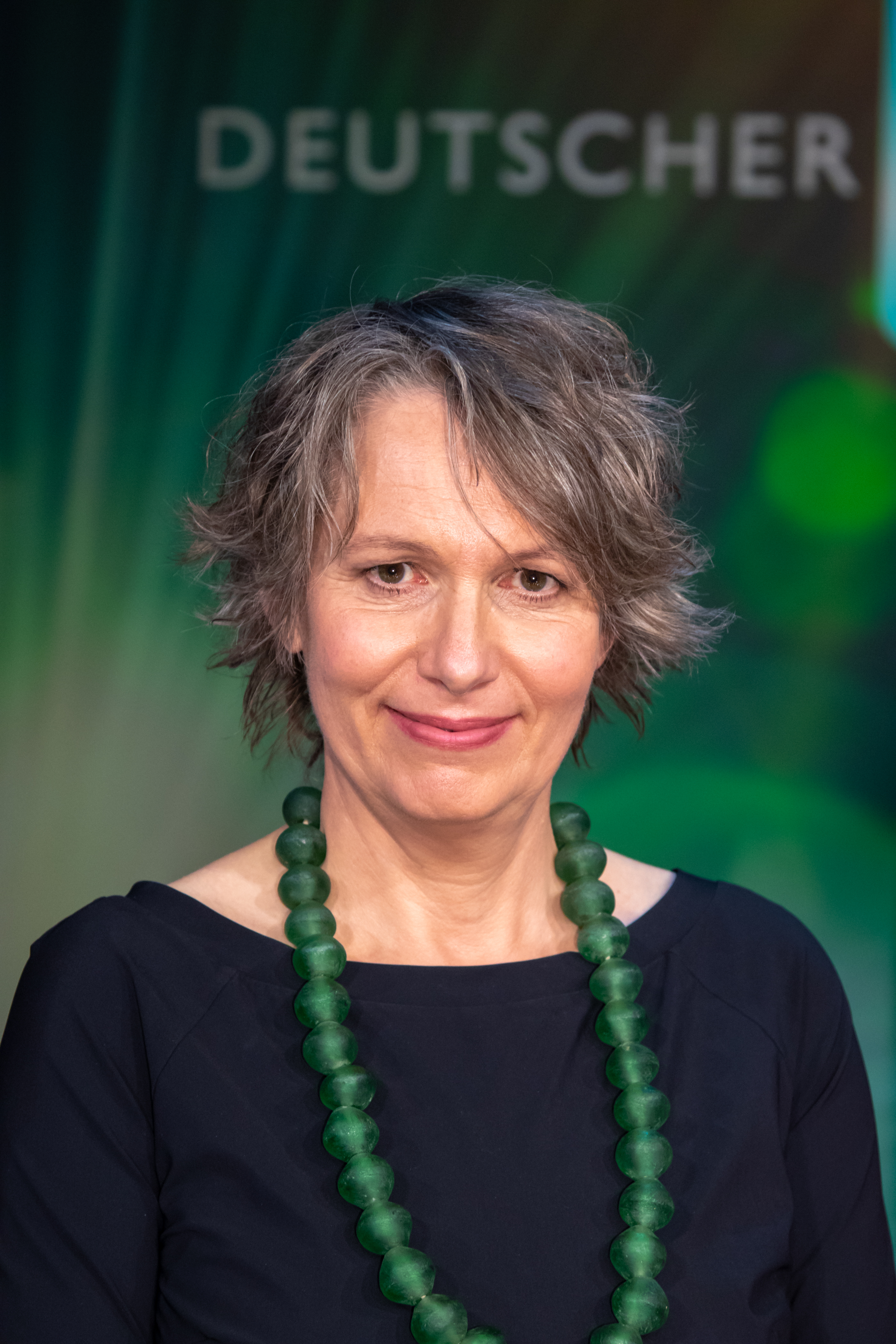
Birgit Guðjónsdóttir in 2018.

Birgit Guðjónsdóttir (born 1962) is an Icelandic cinematographer. She has worked on films all over the world since 1992. In 2018, she was recognized with an honorary German Camera Prize for her lifelong work in cinematography.

== Biography ==
Guðjónsdóttir was born in Reykjavik in 1962. She attended the Höhere Graphische Bundes-Lehr- und Versuchsanstalt in Vienna, but didn't go to the film academy because she was a single parent at the time. Guðjónsdóttir has been working on feature films and documentaries since 1992. She moved to Berlin around 2000.

In 2003, Guðjónsdóttir was lead camera on a German film, Jargo. Guðjónsdóttir has also worked on Good Bye Lenin! (2003), The Bourne Supremacy (2004) and Æeon Flux (2005). She was the cinematographer for the Turkish film Our Grand Despair (2011). The Routledge Dictionary of Turkish Cinema states that one of the film's strong points is Guðjónsdóttir's camera work, including "beautiful outdoor images."

In 2018, she was awarded an honorary German Camera Prize (Deutschen Kamerapreis). This award goes to individuals who have an "outstanding career in filmmaking."
