= Our Grand Despair =

2011 film

- Film poster
- Directed by: Seyfi Teoman
- Written by: Seyfi Teoman; Barış Bıçakçı
- Produced by: Yamac Okur; Nadir Operli
- Starring: İlker Aksum
- Cinematography: Birgit Guðjónsdóttir
- Edited by: Çiçek Kahraman
- Release dates: 16 February 2011 (Berlinale); 15 April 2011 (Turkey)
- Running time: 102 minutes
- Country: Turkey
- Language: Turkish

Our Grand Despair (Turkish: Bizim Büyük Çaresizliğimiz) is a 2011 Turkish drama film, directed by Seyfi Teoman, about two flatmates who reluctantly take in their friend's traumatised sister. The film premiered in competition at the 61st Berlin International Film Festival.

== Cast ==
- İlker Aksum as Ender
- Fatih Al as Çetin
- Günes Sayin as Nihal
- Taner Birsel as Murat (Çetin's brother)
- Baki Davrak as Fikret (Nihal's brother)
- Mehmet Ali Nuroğlu as Bora (Nihal's boyfriend)

== Plot ==
Ender and Çetin take in the orphaned college student Nihal at the behest of her older brother, Fikret. Now with additional responsibility, the two bachelors straighten up their lives and eventually begin falling for their new housemate while confronting the "grand despair" that is their middle age.

== Production ==
The film was adapted from a novel of the same name by Barış Bıçakçı. Director Seyfi Teoman chose to conduct filming in Ankara, stating that he believed the setting of Ankara was central to the film and that he'd attempted to reflect as much of Ankara's modern architectural style as possible. As a football fan, Teoman included a shot of Gheorghe Hagi's football jersey as an homage.

== Reception ==
Jay Weissberg, writing for Variety, praised Birgit Guðjónsdóttir's cinematography but said that the film "contains an elephant in the room so huge, it obscures every relationship in the film and makes the subsequent emotional developments feel unconvincing"—namely, the physical closeness between Cetin and Ender who, while portrayed as developing feelings for Nihal, are clearly depicted as being in love with each other. Contrarily, a review in The Hollywood Reporter called the film a "portrait of a complex, intense — but never remotely homoerotic — male bond, the kind of relationship which American cinema has only recently started to explore." The Hollywood Reporter called the film "an accessibly droll, bittersweet comedy (rather more sweet than bitter) which has considerable English-language remake potential." Jonathan Romney, writing for Screen Daily, opined that despite "economical and poised" directing the film never quite found its footing, although he anticipated the film being remade as an American romantic comedy starring Vince Vaughn and "some other Hollywood renta-nice-guy."

Turkish film scholar Gönül Dönmez-Colin characterized the film as "a well-constructed work that carries the trend of 'masculinity in crisis' films that have marked the cinema of Turkey in the new millennium."
