= Star Wars Trilogy Arcade =

1998 video game

- North American arcade flyer
- Developer: Sega AM Annex
- Publisher: Sega
- Directors: Kenji Sasaki; Takahiro Kakizawa; Motoshi Takabe
- Designer: Nobuhiro Morishita
- Programmer: Takahiro Kakizawa
- Composer: John Williams
- Series: Star Wars
- Platform: Arcade
- Release: JP: November 1998; NA: January 1999
- Genre: Rail shooter
- Modes: Single-player, multiplayer
- Arcade system: Sega Model 3

Star Wars Trilogy Arcade is a 1998 rail shooter video game developed by Sega AM Annex and published by Sega for arcades. It is based on the original trilogy of Star Wars films, and was released shortly after those films' special editions. Accompanied by the Star Wars Trilogy pinball game, it is the second in Sega's Star Wars Arcade series, preceded by 1993's Star Wars Arcade and followed by 2000's Star Wars Racer Arcade.

== Gameplay ==
The player battles TIE fighters in the mission recalling the final battle in Return of the Jedi.

Operating on Sega's Model 3 arcade system board and developed by Sega's AM Annex subsidiary, the gameplay has two main themes: three missions that reenact key scenes from the original Star Wars film trilogy, plus a final unlockable mission; and two boss battles against Darth Vader and Boba Fett.

Normal gameplay involves the player moving a crosshair around the screen using a joystick and pressing the fire button atop the joystick to shoot. A "special event" button lights at certain points of the game and when pressed, triggers an event to happen onscreen. The player selects which film's mission to play first and each mission has three parts.

The mission from A New Hope reenacts the final space battle at Yavin, with Luke Skywalker piloting an X-wing fighter against TIE fighters. The second part of the mission involves flying along the Death Star's surface, shooting TIE fighters and XX-9 heavy turbolaser turret guns, and confronting Darth Vader's TIE fighter. The third part of the mission pits the player within the battle station's trench, using proton torpedoes aimed at the exhaust port to destroy the Death Star.

The Empire Strikes Back mission reenacts the film's opening battle on Hoth. The first part of the mission involves shooting AT-ST walkers and probe droids, and helping other snowspeeders to take down the giant AT-AT walkers. The second part of the mission reenacts the escape from Hoth, running through corridors of the rebel base, shooting Snow Troopers and wampas while traveling to the Millennium Falcon. The third part of the mission takes place in the hangar, again shooting snowtroopers and one last wampa before escaping.

The Return of the Jedi mission begins with a reenactment of the speeder bike sequence on Endor from the film, where the player must shoot scout troopers on their own speeder bikes. The second part of the stage has the player moving towards the Empire's base on Endor, shooting any enemies on the way. In the third part of the mission, the player must rapidly fire a blaster at an AT-ST walker. The game's final mission, which is unlocked after clearing the other three missions, directs the player as Wedge Antilles flying an X-wing, first engaging TIE Interceptors while the Rebel and Imperial fleets clash, then flying through the second Death Star's reactor shaft to reach the reactor.

Two boss stages are accessed immediately after beating the conventional missions, although the player is not required to win either to finish the game. In both stages, the player controls Luke Skywalker wielding a lightsaber. In the first boss battle, after clearing two missions, the player has to reflect Boba Fett's blaster shots back at him, in order to knock Fett into the Sarlacc pit behind him. The second, after clearing all three missions, involves the player dueling Darth Vader on the second Death Star.

== Reception ==
Star Wars Trilogy Arcade

Review scores
Publication	Score
AllGame	4.5/5
Player One	61/100

Christopher Michael Baker of AllGame rated the game at 4.5 out of 5, finding it virtually flawless, with excellent graphics, sound, and play control. The joystick controller was said to provide a reactive feel which meaningfully mimics a lightsaber, but the game's only flaw is a minor imperfection in play control during the two bonus stages against Boba Fett and Darth Vader. Destructoid's Anthony Burch found the game at a balance between gameplay (focusing on shooting and lightsabers) and story (focusing on the immersive cinematic reenactment of being part of the Star Wars universe). He said that the game's mission designs generally range from "awesome" to "more awesome", and the A New Hope missions follow 1983's Star Wars arcade game exactly. He found the bonus missions' play control to be "clunky and linear" but nevertheless to feel like a realistic lightsaber could, and to generally be a "delight". The French magazine Player One rated it at 61%, saying that the film settings were well chosen, and compared the lightsaber fight choreography to the pioneering Dragon's Lair (1983)—but complained that the production quality seemed rushed.

== See also ==
- Star Wars: Racer Arcade
- Star Wars Battle Pod
