= King of Thieves (2004 film) =

2004 film

- Directed by: Ivan Fíla
- Written by: Ivan Fíla
- Produced by: Helga Bähr; Rudolf Biermann; Ivan Fíla
- Starring: Lazar Ristovski; Jakov Kultiasov; Katharina Thalbach; Julia Khanverdieva; Oktay Özdemir; Paulus Manker
- Distributed by: Picture This! Entertainment
- Release date: 19 February 2004
- Running time: 101 minutes
- Country: Germany
- Language: German

King of Thieves is a 2004 German film directed by Ivan Fíla, starring Lazar Ristovski, Jakov Kultiasov, Katharina Thalbach, Paulus Manker, Birol Ünel and Werner Daehn.

== Plot ==
Barbu is a young boy growing up in a remote area of Ukraine. He and his older sister Mimma perform circus acts for their village. Barbu and Mimma are sold by their parents to Caruso, a German circus master to supposedly become part of his circus act in Berlin.

On their arrival to Germany, Barbu is taken to the circus, in reality being a training camp of young thieves, and Mimma is sold to Cardinal for prostitution in his brothel. Barbu develops a bond with Caruso and Julie, Caruso's wife, and they feel he is the son they never had. Barbu is trained to pickpocket by Marcel, an older Albanian boy. Caruso eventually discovers that Marcel is keeping a small amount of the cash that he steals, resulting in having him lashed and then sold.

Now working on his own, Barbu learns that Mimma has been forced into prostitution, and attempts to free her by entering the brothel with a colt pistol left for him by Marcel. Barbu fails and is violently returned to the circus by Cardinal. Caruso denies that he knew Mimma was in Germany, and says it will cost 100,000 euros for her freedom.

Barbu steals all of Caruso's hidden stash of money, and attempts to flee with Mimma by having her escape from the brothel window. He is again unsuccessful and severely punished by Caruso. While being lashed, Julie comes in with a pistol and shoots Curuso in the arm. She then takes Barbu to the brothel where they shoot their way to Mimma's room and rescue her.

Caruso arrives to the brothel as the three are leaving, and fatally shoots Julie. He lets Barbu and Mimma leave, and then returns to the circus and burns down his big top whilst inside.

== Cast ==
- Jakov Kultiasov as Barbu
- Lazar Ristovski as Caruso
- Katharina Thalbach as Julie
- Julia Khanverdieva as Mimma
- Oktay Özdemir as Marcel
- Paulus Manker as Cardinal
