= Oktay Özdemir =

German actor (born 1986)

- Born: İnanç Oktay Özdemir; 1986 (age 39–40); Berlin, Germany.
- Years active: 2004–present

İnanç Oktay Özdemir (born 1986) is a German actor.

Özdemir was born in Berlin. His mother was a Turkish immigrant who moved to Germany in the 1970s at the age of 12.

Özdemir was scouted for the 2004 film King of Thieves at an after-school theater and acrobatics club.

== Filmography ==
Film
Year	Film	Role	Notes
2009	Moruk	Murat	
2009	The Crocodiles	Achmed	
2009	Fliegen	Burhan	
2008	Kronos. Ende und Anfang	Nikos	
2008	1. Mai – Helden bei der Arbeit	Nebi	
2007	Leroy	Achmeds Bruder	
2007	Straight	Akin	
2006	A Friend of Mine	Theo	
2006	Black Sheep	Birol	
2006	Tough Enough	Erol	
2005	Tote Hose - Kann nicht, gibt's nicht	Dsengis	
2004	Jargo	Kamil	
2004	King of Thieves	Marcel	

=== Television ===
Year	Film	Role	Notes
2008	Dr. Molly & Karl	Cem	
2008	Die Anwälte	Goran Lavic	
2008	Großstadtrevier	Nuri Aydin	
2007	Stubbe – Von Fall zu Fall	Imran Aydin	
2007	Dr. Psycho – Die Bösen, die Bullen, meine Frau und ich	Omar Khahari	
2006	Rage	Can	
2006	Nachtschicht – Der Ausbruch	Faruk Abdullah	
2005	Abschnitt 40	Al-Hariri	
2005	Doppelter Einsatz	Tefik	
