= Ivan Fíla =

Czech film director and scriptwriter

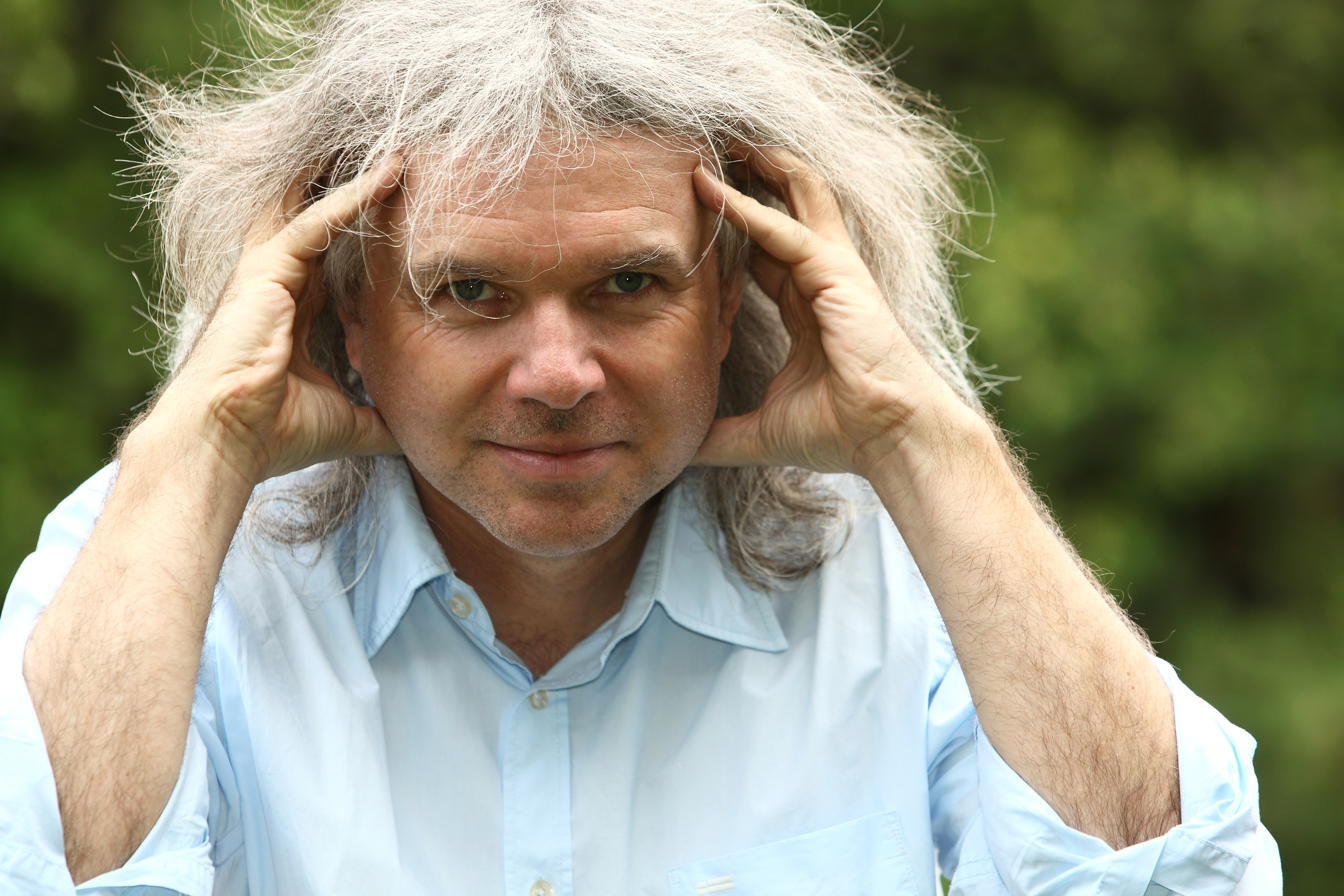
- Born: Prague, Czechoslovakia
- Occupation: Filmmaker/Screenwriter

Ivan Fíla, alternate name Ivan Fila, is a Czech film director, screenwriter and producer.

== Life and work ==
Fíla was born in Prague, Czechoslovakia. He moved to Germany in 1977 where he received a directing and scriptwriting degree at the Film Department of the university in Cologne. Fíla shot documentaries and shorts before making his feature debut with Lea. The feature premiered at the Venice Film Festival in 1996 and won the OCIC-Award. Lea was also nominated for Best Foreign Language Film at the Golden Globes and for best young film at the European Film Awards. At the Brussels International Film Festival, Lea won both the Audience Award and the Crystal Star for Best European Feature. Lea also won the Satyajit Ray Award for best film at the London Film Festival and many others including two Czech Lions. Lea brought Fíla to Hollywood where he was hired by Steven Spielberg to rewrite and direct The Betty Schimmel Story.

Fíla's follow-up King of thieves premiered at the Moscow Filmfestival in 2004. King of Thieves won the Prix d'Or for Best European Screenplay and won four Czech Lions including Best Actor. Other credits include documentaries as Vaclav Havel – A bohemian fairy tale, Hitler's blackmail, Steps in a Labyrinth, Fog, Tales from another world, Joschka Fischer and others. Fíla is currently working on his English language project Bella Luna.

He lives in Frankfurt, Los Angeles and Prague.

== Filmography ==
=== Feature films ===
- 1996: Lea
- 2004: King of thieves
- 2012: Bella Luna (in preparation)

=== Documentary Films ===
- 1982: Harley Heaven
- 1985: Salty dreams
- 1987: Margarete Buber-Neumann - A German destiny
- 1988: The Pauls's church
- 1989: In the name of the revolution
- 1990: Through a labyrinth
- 1991: Tales from another world
- 1993: Vaclav Havel - A bohemian fairytale
- 1994: Fog
- 1995: Hitler's blackmail
- 2007: Joschka Fischer

=== Short films (all 1986) ===
- Story of hope
- Encounter
- The last witch
- Two brothers
- The black man

== Awards ==
For Lea

- 1996: OCIC Award at the Venice Film Festival
- 1996: European Film Awards - Best Young European Film of the Year- nominee
- 1997: Satyajit Ray Award at the London Film Festival
- 1997: Two Czech Lions and 9 nominees at the Czech Film Awards
- 1997: Audience Award, Prix C.I.C.A.E and Prix du Jury etudiant - Best Film, Premiers Plans Festival D´Angers, France
- 1997: Opera Prima Award - Best Film, International Film Festival Montevideo, Uruguay
- 1997: Audience award at the Brussels Film Festival, Belgium
- 1997: Nominee - Best Film at Deutscher Filmpreis, Germany
- 1997: Crystal Star at the Brussels Film Festival, Belgium
- 1997: Grand Prix VESUVIO AWARD at the Napoli Filmfestival, Italy
- 1997: Grand Prix - Best Film at the International Film Festival, Film Forum Bratislava, Slovakia
- 1997: FIPRECI-Award - Best Film at the International Film Festival Sotschi, Russia
- 1997: Opera Prima Award - Best Feature Film at Puerto Rico International Film Festival
- 1998: Golden Globe Awards - Best Foreign Film - nominee
- 1998: Best Dramatic Feature at the San Jose Film Festival, USA

For King of Thieves

- 2004: Slovakias Oscar nomination for Best Foreign Film
- 2004: Four Czech Lions and 10 nominees (including Best Film, Best Direcror and Best Screenplay) at the Czech Film Awards
- 2004: "Silver Griphon" - Audience Award for Best Film at the Festival of Festivals St. Petersburg, Russia
- 2004: TRILOBIT - Best Director and Best Screenplay, Czech film and TV Association Annual Award
- 2005: Audience Award - Best Film - World Cinema at the Phoenix Film Festival
- 2005: Best Film - nomination at the Adolf Adolf Grimme Awards, Germany

For Hitler's blackmail

- 1995: German TV-Award - Best Film
- 1995: Best Film at the Festival international du film d´histoire, France
