= Star Wars Transformers =

Toyline

The Transformer figures of Chewbacca (left) and Han Solo (center) combine to create the Millennium Falcon.

Star Wars Transformers is a Hasbro toy line started in 2006. The line features robot versions of various characters from the Star Wars franchise that transform into vehicles from the same series. Now, they can usually range from $30 to $400, depending on the product.

The toy characters' factions include bounty hunters, the Galactic Empire, the Galactic Republic, the Rebel Alliance, and the Separatists. According to Hasbro, the vehicles from Shadows of the Empire are not used because the toy line targets collectors who are mostly familiar with the film series and the Clone Wars animated series.

In late 2017, TakaraTomy announced a reboot of the line with new designs and higher price points to begin in March 2018 starting with Darth Vader, who transforms into a TIE Advanced X1.

== Critical reaction ==
Upon the launch of the Revenge of the Sith on DVD, Hasbro unveiled the initial wave of Star Wars Transformers for retail availability. This event sparked enthusiasm among fans of both franchises. An author from The Free Lance-Star said "I came across what is perhaps the greatest invention mankind has developed in recent years", when referring to the release of new toy line.

Merging both franchise's toy lines was "a natural fit". In 2007, Toyfare magazine called the Han Solo and Chewbacca figures—which combine to create the Millennium Falcon—the 23rd top toy released in the previous 10 years. In 2006, the toy was voted the #9 toy of the year by FamilyFun Magazine.

== List of figures ==
=== Attacktix ===
Intergalactic Showdown (Multi-pack, 2006)

- AT-RT with Clone Pilot
- Darth Vader
- Luke Skywalker

=== Crossovers / Star Wars Transformers ===
Bounty Hunters

- Boba Fett / Slave 1 | 2006
- Jango Fett / Slave 1 {redeco of Boba Fett) | 2007

Galactic Empire

- AT-AT Driver / AT-AT | 2007
- Darth Vader / TIE Advanced Fighter | 2006
- Darth Vader / TIE Advanced Fighter (2-pack light-gray repaint) | 2007
- Darth Vader / Sith Starfighter (remolded redeco of Obi-Wan Kenobi) | 2006
- Darth Vader / Death Star | 2007
- Emperor Palpatine / Imperial Shuttle | 2006
- Emperor Palpatine / Imperial Shuttle (black deco) | 2009
- TIE Pilot / TIE Bomber | 2008

Jedi Order

- Anakin Skywalker / Jedi Starfighter (remolded redeco of Obi-Wan Kenobi) | 2006
- Anakin Skywalker / Jedi Starfighter (remolded redeco of Saesee Tiin) | 2009
- Mace Windu / Jedi Starfighter (remolded redeco of Obi-Wan Kenobi) | 2007
- Obi-Wan Kenobi / Jedi Starfighter (Episode III model) | 2006
- Obi-Wan Kenobi / Jedi Starfighter (2-pack blue repaint) | 2007
- Obi-Wan Kenobi / Jedi Starfighter (remolded redeco of Saesee Tiin) | 2008
- Saesee Tiin / Jedi Starfighter (Episode II model) | 2007

Rebel Alliance

- Han Solo and Chewbacca / Millennium Falcon (combiner) | 2007
- Luke Skywalker / X-wing Fighter | 2006
- Luke Skywalker / Snowspeeder | 2007

Galactic Republic

- Clone Pilot / ARC-170 Starfighter | 2006
- Clone ARC Pilot / ARC-170 Starfighter (tigershark redeco) | 2006
- Clone Pilot / Republic Gunship | 2007
- Clone ARC Pilot / Republic Gunship (tigershark redeco) | 2008
- Clone Pilot / V-19 Torrent | 2009
- Commander Cody / Turbo Tank | 2007

Confederacy of Independent Systems

- General Grievous / Wheel Bike | 2006
- General Grievous / Grievous's Starfighter | 2008

Sith Order

- Darth Maul / Sith Infiltrator | 2006
