= Constantin von Jascheroff =

German actor (born 1986)

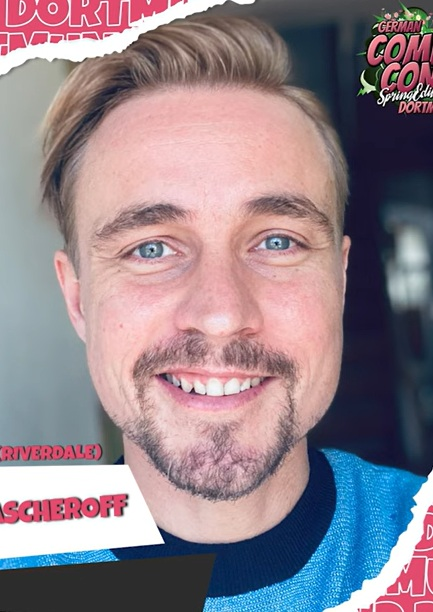
- von Jascheroff - GCC Dortmund 2023
- Born: 5 March 1986 (age 40); East Berlin, East Germany
- Occupation: Actor
- Years active: 1995-present

Constantin von Jascheroff (born 5 March 1986) is a German actor. He has appeared in over seventy films since 1995.

== Filmography ==
=== German Dub ===
Year	Title	Actor
1999	Star Wars: The Phantom Menace	Jake Lloyd
2000	My Dog Skip	Frankie Muniz
2004	A Cinderella Story	J. D. Pardo
2008	Middle of Nowhere	Anton Yelchin
2009	Star Trek	Anton Yelchin
2011	Like Crazy	Anton Yelchin
2011	The Beaver	Anton Yelchin
2011	Fright Night	Anton Yelchin
2013	Star Trek Into Darkness	Anton Yelchin
2014	Kingsman: The Secret Service	Taron Egerton
2014	Testament of Youth	Taron Egerton
2015	Broken Horses	Anton Yelchin
2015	The Driftless Area	Anton Yelchin
2015	Avengers: Age of Ultron	Aaron Taylor-Johnson
2015	Legend	Taron Egerton
2016	Eddie the Eagle	Taron Egerton
2016	Star Trek Beyond	Anton Yelchin
2017–present	Riverdale (TV series)	KJ Apa
2017	Spider-Man: Homecoming	Donald Glover
2017	Kingsman: The Golden Circle	Taron Egerton
2017	Thoroughbreds	Anton Yelchin
2017	Atomic Blonde	Bill Skarsgård
2018	Billionaire Boys Club	Taron Egerton
2018	Robin Hood	Taron Egerton
2019	Once Upon a Time in Hollywood	Emile Hirsch
2020	I Still Believe	KJ Apa
2020	Songbird	KJ Apa
2021	Son	Emile Hirsch
