= Lea (film) =

1996 film by Ivan Fíla

- Directed by: Ivan Fila
- Produced by: Ivan Fila; Eliska Sekavova; Herbert Rimbach
- Starring: Lenka Vlasakova; Christian Redl; Hanna Schygulla; Miroslav Donutil
- Music by: Petr Hapka
- Release date: 1997
- Running time: 100 minutes
- Country: Czech Republic/France/Germany

Lea is a Czech drama film. It was released in 1997.

== Plot ==
Lea witnesses her mother's rape and murder by her father as a child and because of it speaks very little and writes poems to her mother. Lea then grows up with foster parents in a different part of Slovakia. Strehlow buys Lea, now aged 21, from her foster father and imprisons her in a castle in Germany, using the same tools Lea's father used to control Lea as a child and to kill Lea's mother. As Strehlow learns more of Lea's past, he permits her to continue writing to her mother. Lea dies of a stroke within a year of living with Strehlow.

== Cast ==
- Lenka Vlasakova.... as Lea
- Christian Redl.... as Strehlow
- Hanna Schygulla.... as Wanda
- Miroslav Donutil.... as Gregor Palty
- Udo Kier.... as Block
- Gerd Lohmeyer.... as Postmaster
- Tereza Vetrovska.... as Young Lea

== Awards ==
1997 Angers European First Film Festival

- Won Audience Award for Feature Film (tied with Some Mother's Son)
- Won C.I.C.A.E award
- Won Telcipro award (tied with Pretty Village, Pretty Flame)

1997 Brussels International Film Festival

- Won Audience Award
- Won Crystal Star Award for Best European Feature

Cinequest San Jose Film Festival

- Won Best Feature Award
- Nominated for Maverick Spirit Award

1998 Czech Lions

- Won Best Actress Award going to Lenka Vlasáková
- Won Best Cinematography going to Vladimír Smutný
- Nominated for Best Design Achievement going to Petr Kunc and Ludvík Široký
- Nominated for Best Director going to Ivan Fila
- Nominated for Best Editing going to Ivana Davidová
- Nominated for Best Film
- Nominated for Best Screenplay going to Ivan Fila
- Nominated for Best Sound going to Marcel Spisak and Max Rammier-Rogall

1996 European Film Awards

- Nominated European Film Award for Best Young Film

1997 German Film Awards

- Nominated Gold Film Award for Outstanding Feature Film

1998 USA Golden Globe

- Nominated Golden Globe for Best Foreign Language Film

1997 London Film Festival

- Won Satyajit Ray Award

1997 Max Ophüls Festival

- Won Audience Award

1997 Sochi International Film Festival

- Won FIPRESCI Prize

1997 Stockholm Film Festival

- Nominated Bronze Horse Award

1997 Venice Film Festival

- Won OCIC Award in Honorable Mention
