= Jake Lloyd =

American former actor (born 1989)

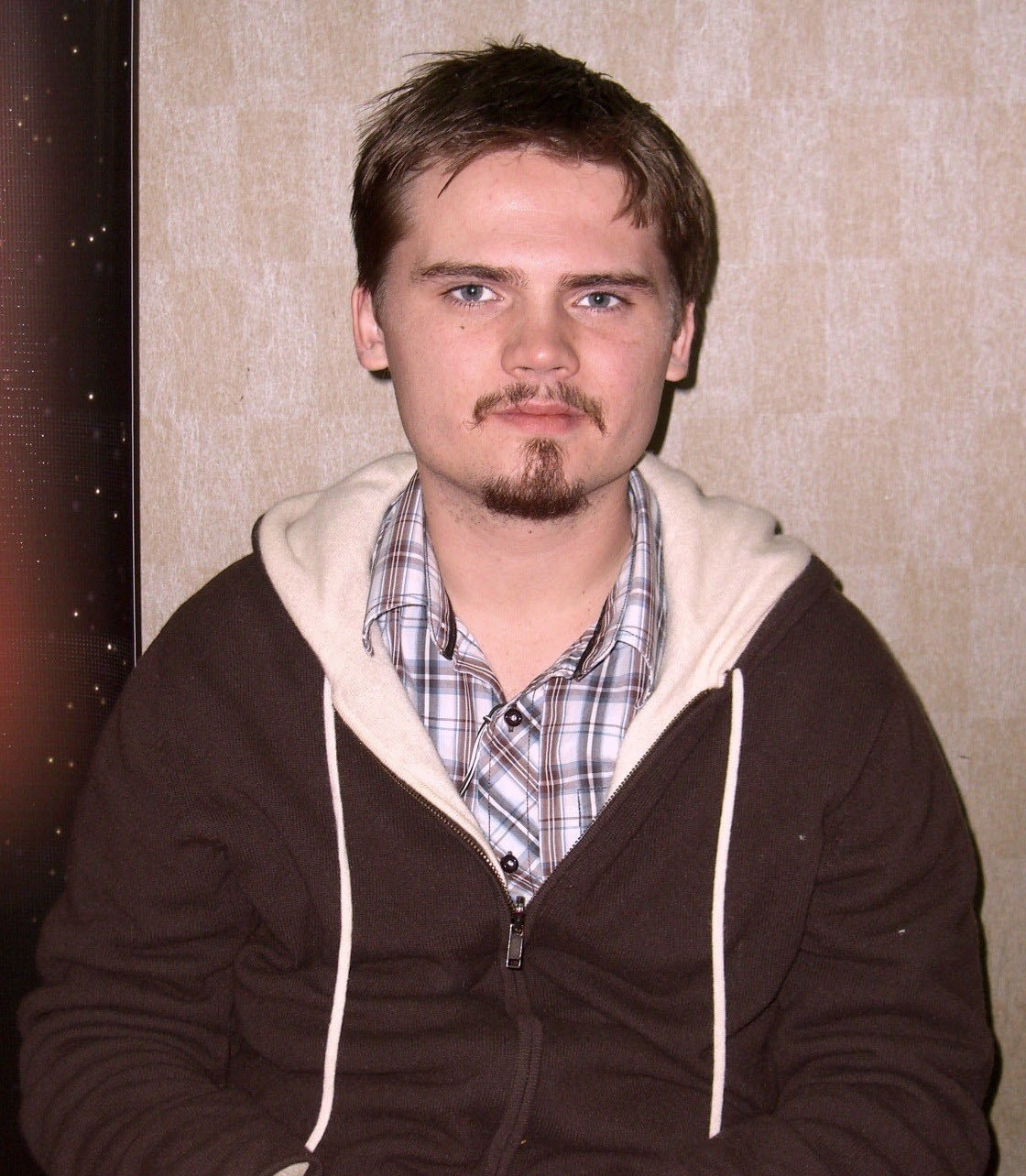
- Lloyd in 2010
- Born: Jake Matthew Lloyd; March 5, 1989 (age 37); Fort Collins, Colorado, U.S.
- Education: Carmel High School
- Occupation: Actor
- Years active: 1996–2009

Jake Matthew Lloyd (born March 5, 1989) is an American former actor who portrayed young Anakin Skywalker in the film Star Wars: Episode I – The Phantom Menace (1999) and Jamie Langston in Jingle All the Way (1996).

== Early life ==
Jake Matthew Lloyd was born in Fort Collins, Colorado, on March 5, 1989 to Josh Broadbent and his wife, Lisa (née Flowers). Lloyd attended Carmel High School in Carmel, Indiana, where he graduated in 2007.

== Career ==
=== 1996–2000: Acting debut and stardom with Star Wars ===
Lloyd began his acting career in 1996, playing Jimmy Sweet in four episodes of ER. He was then cast as Jake Warren in Unhook the Stars. He got his big break playing Jamie Langston in Jingle All the Way. He also played Mark Armstrong in Apollo 11. Lloyd gained worldwide fame when he was chosen by George Lucas to play the young Anakin Skywalker in the 1999 film Star Wars: Episode I – The Phantom Menace, the first film in the Star Wars prequel trilogy.

3,000 other candidates auditioned for the role and the process of finding an actor to play the role took up to two years. Lucas selected other children who had auditioned to attend a screen test at Skywalker Ranch in March 1997. Producer Rick McCallum said, "Jake has a very interesting personality. He's smart, mischievous and loves anything mechanical. He had all the right qualities that George was looking for."

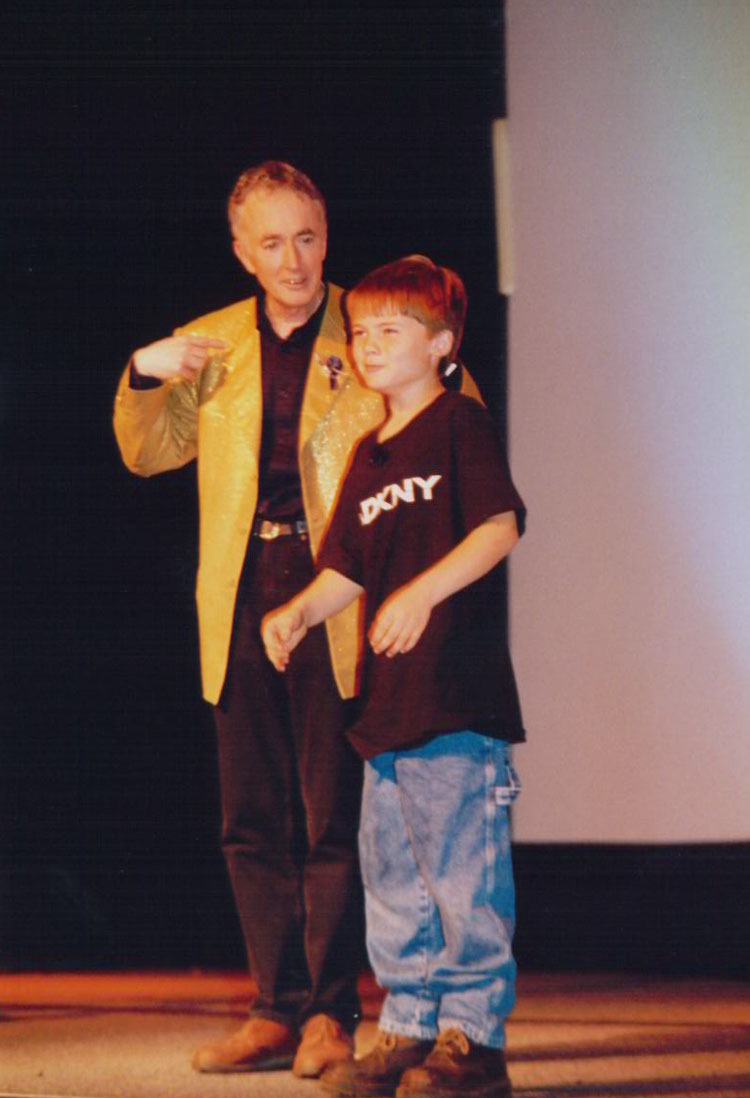
Lloyd (right) with Anthony Daniels (left) at the first Star Wars Celebration in 1999

Prior to his audition, Lloyd was already an enthusiast of Star Wars and wore a Darth Vader costume one Halloween. He auditioned twice and waited two years before being cast as Anakin. Lloyd's age was closer to the age of his character when filming began. Initially, Anakin was ten years old but after a change in the script his age was lowered to nine. Lloyd established several similarities between himself and his character saying, "I love doing mechanics; he is one mechanical kid. I like to build stuff." Like with some of the cast, he was impressed by the production including the props and costumes. Lloyd said, "It was just fantastic. I was blown away the first day."

"I couldn't believe some of the things they wrote about the prequels, you know. I mean really, beyond 'I didn't like it'. I'm still angry about the way they treated Jake Lloyd. He was only ten years old, that boy, and he did exactly what George wanted him to do. Believe me, I understand clunky dialog."

— Mark Hamill defending Lloyd in a 2017 interview with Vulture

Lloyd attended the first Star Wars Celebration in Denver, Colorado which celebrated the upcoming release of The Phantom Menace. The film was released to cinemas in May 1999. Initially reviews were mixed; however the film became the highest-grossing film of 1999 and the highest-grossing Star Wars film at the time of its release. One of his co-stars, Anthony Daniels said in his 2019 memoirs that Lloyd "was amazingly mature and self-confident" and "delighted the fans with his happy banter" during the Celebration. Lloyd received the Young Artist Award for Best Performance in a Feature Film. Like with a lot of the cast and crew, Lloyd defended Ahmed Best praising him for his humour and saying, "He is one of the coolest guys that I've ever met." Both actors faced criticism over their performances. Lloyd appeared in the 2001 documentary, The Beginning: Making Star Wars Episode I, which was one of the bonus features of The Phantom Menace DVD release. The documentary chronicles the production of the film and includes footage of Lloyd's audition as well as the other potential Anakins with Natalie Portman prior to getting the part.

Due to Star Wars: Episode II: Attack of the Clones being set 10 years after The Phantom Menace, Lloyd did not reprise his role. Hayden Christensen portrayed Anakin as an adult in the following films rounding up the prequel trilogy. Christensen admitted to Star Wars Insider in 2005, that he found it difficult bridging the gap between Jake Lloyd's Anakin as an innocent boy and the villain Vader was introduced as in the original trilogy. Following a reappraisal of the prequel trilogy, in 2023, Christensen said that by going back to the character as a child destined to achieve great things in The Phantom Menace, "George Lucas subverted our expectations and understanding of this character" and made it a good starting point for Anakin's character development throughout the trilogy. Archival footage of Lloyd as Anakin can be seen in the recap at the beginning of the 2022 mini-series, Obi-Wan Kenobi.

In 2000, Lloyd filmed the dramas Die with Me and Madison, then retired from acting, although Madison was not released in cinemas until 2005.

=== 2001–2012: Post-acting work ===
After retiring from acting in 2001, Lloyd continued to make appearances at sci-fi and comic-book festivals. In 2012, he announced that he would be directing a documentary highlighting Tibetan refugees in India. Lloyd was commissioned in 2012 to create a promotional video for singer Mallory Low. Star Wars: Episode II – Attack of the Clones actor Daniel Logan, who played the young Boba Fett in the film, starred in the video.

Lloyd left Hollywood for Chicago, and dropped out after a semester at Columbia College Chicago, where he studied film and psychology.

== Personal life ==
In 2012, Lloyd stated his decision to retire from acting in 2001 was due to bullying at school and harassment by the press, both in response to his role in The Phantom Menace. In 2024, Lloyd's mother said he quit acting because of family drama and that he was largely protected from the negativity surrounding his role in Star Wars. She also said Lloyd remains a fan of Star Wars. Anthony Daniels said in his memoirs, "It makes me sad to remember how [Lloyd], who would epitomise the Dark Side, would go to suffer dark times in his own future." However, Daniels also shared his memories of Lloyd's enthusiasm for his involvement in the production of The Phantom Menace and also said, "But for now, Master Ani was a joy."

=== Mental health ===
According to his mother, Lloyd's mental health began worsening in high school. He began suffering from delusions that he lived in multiple "realities". He was initially incorrectly diagnosed with bipolar disorder, but refused to take the medications prescribed to treat the condition.

By college, Lloyd began suffering from visual and auditory hallucinations, causing him to miss classes and earn poor grades. He complained of people with black eyes following him and had imaginary conversations with Jon Stewart while watching The Daily Show. He was diagnosed with paranoid schizophrenia in 2008, but was unaware of his own condition at the time. His father's family has a history of the illness. His sister Madison Broadbent, who was an extra in The Phantom Menace, died in her sleep from natural causes on July 16, 2018, adding to his personal struggles.

=== Legal issues ===
In March 2015, police responded to an alleged assault by Lloyd on his mother. In a statement to the Indianapolis Metropolitan Police Department, she alleged Lloyd arrived at her house and began verbally berating her before physically assaulting her. She declined to press charges, stating that Lloyd had been diagnosed with schizophrenia and was not taking his medication at the time.

On June 17, 2015, Lloyd was arrested in Colleton County, South Carolina, under the name Jake Broadbent for reckless driving, driving without a license, and resisting arrest; he failed to stop for a red light while driving on a trip from Florida to Canada, which initiated a high-speed police chase across multiple counties. He was charged with failing to stop for officers, resisting arrest, reckless driving and driving without a license. At a hearing on June 22, his bail was set at $10,700. His mother stated that he refused to speak with her and that the police refused to give him his psychiatric medication. She also was unable to have him transferred to a psychiatric hospital for 10 months because no beds were available. On June 23, she publicly revealed his schizophrenia diagnosis to TMZ and said that "the family plans to try and get him help again ... once he's released from jail". In April 2016, Lloyd was transferred from Colleton County Detention Center to a mental health facility.

Lloyd's mother said his mental health deteriorated further after the death of his sister Madison in 2018. In January 2020, Lloyd and his mother confirmed that they had moved to California to be closer to family.

In May 2023, when Lloyd suffered a complete "psychotic break", he was arrested again after turning off a car in the middle of a busy freeway. When police attempted to talk with him, his responses were incoherent. Lloyd was immediately hospitalized and sent to an inpatient care facility for 18 months. In a March 2024 interview, Lloyd's mother stated that his mental health was improving during his hospitalization.

== Filmography ==
=== Film ===
Year	Title	Role	Notes	Ref.
1996	Unhook the Stars	J. J.		
1996	Jingle All the Way	Jamie Langston		
1996	Apollo 11	Mark Armstrong	Television film	
1998	Virtual Obsession	Jack	Television film	
1999	Star Wars: Episode I – The Phantom Menace	Anakin Skywalker	Young Artist Award for Best Performance in a Feature Film: Young Actor Age Ten Years or Under; Nominated – Saturn Award for Best Performance by a Younger Actor	
2001	Die with Me	Mickey Cooper		
2001	Madison	Mike McCormick		
2009	Peer Pressure	Production Assistant	Short film	

=== Television ===
Year	Title	Role	Notes
1996	ER	Jimmy Sweet	4 episodes
1996–1999	The Pretender	Ronnie Collins; Young Angelo / Timmy	4 episodes
2019	Star Wars Galaxy of Adventures	Young Anakin Skywalker	Episode: "Jedi vs. Sith – The Skywalker Saga"; uncredited voice (archive material)
2022	Obi-Wan Kenobi	Young Anakin Skywalker	Episode: "Part I" (archive material)

=== Video games ===
Year	Title	Voice role	Notes
1999	Star Wars: Episode I – The Phantom Menace	Anakin Skywalker	
1999	Star Wars Episode I: Racer	Anakin Skywalker	
2000	Star Wars Episode I: Jedi Power Battles	Anakin Skywalker	
2001	Star Wars: Galactic Battlegrounds	Anakin Skywalker	
2001	Star Wars: Super Bombad Racing	Anakin Skywalker	
2002	Star Wars Racer Revenge	Anakin Skywalker	
