= Star Wars Episode I: Racer =

1999 video game

- North American Windows box art
- Developer: LucasArts (Note: The Game Boy Color version was developed by Nintendo R&D1 and Pax Softnica.)
- Publishers: LucasArts; Nintendo (Game Boy Color); Aspyr (2020 ports); THQ Nordic (PlayStation 4 and Switch retail)
- Designers: Jon Knoles; Eric Johnston; Brett Tosti
- Programmers: Eric Johnston; Mark Blattel; Darren Johnson
- Series: Star Wars Racer
- Platforms: Windows, Nintendo 64, Game Boy Color, Mac OS, Dreamcast, Nintendo Switch, PlayStation 4, Xbox One
- Release: May 18, 1999: Windows; NA: May 18, 1999; EU: June 4, 1999 Nintendo 64; NA: May 18, 1999; EU: June 4, 1999; JP: July 21, 1999 Game Boy Color; NA: December 6, 1999; EU: December 17, 1999 Mac OS; NA: December 15, 1999 Dreamcast; NA: April 3, 2000; EU: July 28, 2000 Switch, PlayStation 4; WW: June 23, 2020 Xbox One; WW: October 27, 2020
- Genre: Racing
- Modes: Single-player, multiplayer

Star Wars Episode I: Racer is a 1999 racing video game developed and published by LucasArts. It is based on the podracing sequence in the film Star Wars: Episode I – The Phantom Menace. The game features all of the racers and race course on Tatooine from The Phantom Menace. It adds several courses, on Tatooine and various planets. The game has several single-player modes, including a tournament mode. The format of multiplayer mode varies by platform. Jake Lloyd and Lewis MacLeod, who portrayed Anakin Skywalker and Sebulba in The Phantom Menace, reprise their roles in the game.

Episode I: Racer received generally positive reviews from critics. Several major media outlets listed it as one of the top Star Wars video games. As of 2011, the game holds the Guinness record as the best-selling sci-fi racing game, with worldwide sales of 3.12 million units, followed by series like Wipeout and F-Zero. Two podracing games were released later. Star Wars: Racer Arcade, an arcade game featuring many similar tracks and characters, was released in 2000. A sequel, Star Wars Racer Revenge was released in 2002 for the PlayStation 2.

It received an HD re-release for Nintendo Switch and PlayStation 4 in June 2020. It was later released on Xbox One in October 2020.

== Gameplay ==
Episode I: Racer features all of the film's racers and the race course used in The Phantom Menace.

Star Wars Episode I: Racer features a variety of tracks spanning several different planets. It includes all of the racers in the film, plus additional competitors. The player character's podracer is equipped with an afterburner that the player can engage for a boost of speed. While the engine is engaged, its temperature will rise. If pushed for too long, it will suffer an engine fire and explode, destroying the podracer and costing the player several seconds to respawn and continue racing. The podracer will also be destroyed if one or both engines sustain severe damage from colliding with too many walls or obstacles, requiring the player to steer carefully to avoid falling behind. The player can actively repair the podracer while competing, but doing so slows the podracer until repairs are either complete or stopped.

Three single-player game modes are available. In Tournament mode, the player character competes in a championship. Completing races awards money, with higher-ranked finishes resulting in higher payouts. This can be used to buy parts or repair droids, unlock tracks, and unlock racers. Free Race mode allows the player to practice any previously unlocked courses using any unlocked racer. The player character cannot earn money or unlock tracks and racers, but can set the difficulty of the opponents. Time Attack pits the player character against the clock, racing to achieve the fastest time on the given course. This mode is not available in the PC version. Instead, the Free Play mode allows the player to set the number of computer opponents to 0.

Multiplayer mode differs between the PC and console versions. The N64 and Dreamcast versions feature a two-player split-screen mode, and the Windows and Macintosh versions allow play over a local area network (LAN). This Windows version uses the deprecated IPX protocol to accomplish this, and the Macintosh version uses TCP/IP. The multiplayer mode can support up to 8 players.

== Development ==
Star Wars Episode I: Racer was developed and published by LucasArts for Windows in May 1999. Development took approximately two years. Upon completing Star Wars: Shadows of the Empire, two of its project leads began initial development. Tools included 3D Studio Max, Alias Wavefront, and Autodesk Softimage. Multiple graphical application programming interfaces (APIs) were tested, including 3dfx Glide, OpenGL, and Direct3D. Ultimately the game shipped with only Direct3D support because according to project lead Brett Tosti, when testing Glide and OpenGL the developers "didn't see any performance increases so didn't add support". The team had to develop a physics simulation from only a few short film clips given to them. According to Tosti, their approximations ended up very close to the film: "We really didn't get to see how good our estimates were until the very end." Project lead John Knoles emphasized that the team's goal was for a strong sense of speed. He stated they wanted to make it "feel like an eyeball-peeling racing game, where you're going so fast, you're just nervous".

The game was originally titled Star Wars: Podracer; however, the subtitle was changed to Episode I Racer when LucasArts learned that another company owned the trademark for games with "Pod" in the title. Actor Jake Lloyd, who portrayed Anakin Skywalker in Star Wars Episode I: The Phantom Menace, promoted the game at E3 1999 and provided voice-over in the game. The theatrical score and various sound effects from Star Wars: Episode I – The Phantom Menace was reused for the game. The podracers were recreated using specifications from the film, and the Tatooine environment was also sourced from the film. Several of the game's other locales had not appeared in prior Star Wars games. Tosti said the varied environments were "to add more depth to the gameplay". During an IGN interview with Tom Byron of LucasArts at E3 1999, the question of online play was brought up. Byron was unsure, citing problems "mostly because of latency issues". Some multiplayer code from Star Wars Jedi Knight: Dark Forces II was utilized for Episode I: Racer. Ultimately, Internet play was not included. The Windows version uses the deprecated IPX protocol to accomplish this, while the Macintosh version uses the TCP/IP stack. The multiplayer mode can support up to eight players. The game was supported by a $10 million marketing budget.

== Release ==
Episode I: Racer was ported and released for several other platforms: Nintendo 64 Dreamcast, and Game Boy Color. The announced PlayStation version of the game was not released. The Nintendo 64 version received a special edition Star Wars Episode I: Racer hardware bundle, including the standard gray and black console and a copy of the game. Though the Nintendo 64 cartridge can optionally take advantage of Nintendo's Expansion Pak memory unit to display additional textures, the limited capacity of the cartridge resulted in the removal of all pre-rendered cutscenes of the Windows and Macintosh versions. It is the first LucasArts game to be released on the Dreamcast. The Game Boy Color release features entirely different gameplay from its console and PC counterparts. The Game Boy Color hardware is technically incapable of rendering the 3D graphics used in the other versions, so the game instead features one-on-one racing duels on abbreviated, linear tracks using an overhead 2D view. The Game Boy Color version of the game has an additional "rumble" feature.

The game was re-released online via the DRM-free GOG.com store in May 2018. On October 18, 2019, the Nintendo 64 version was re-released in both a standard and Collector's Edition set with approval by Disney and Lucasfilm in limited quantities by Limited Run Games. On March 26, 2020, the Nintendo Switch and PlayStation 4 versions were announced for May 12, 2020. The PlayStation 4 version was delayed by two weeks, with a new release date of May 26, 2020. On May 11, 2020, exactly one day before the Switch version's release, both the PlayStation 4 and the Nintendo Switch versions were eventually rescheduled for June 23, 2020 release due to the COVID-19 pandemic. The Switch version supports motion controls, allowing players to use them to operate the individual throttles of the podracer's twin engines.

== Reception ==
Reception

Aggregate score
Aggregator	Score
GameRankings	(N64) 75.78% (DC) 75.42% (PC) 73.79% (GBC) 69.44%

Review scores
Publication	Score
AllGame	(PC) 2.5/5 (N64) 3.5/5 (GBC) 4/5 (Mac) 4/5 (DC) 2/5
Edge	(N64) 6/10
Game Informer	(PC) 9.25/10 (N64) 9/10 (GBC) 8.25/10
GameSpot	(PC) 8.2/10 (N64) 8.4/10 (GBC) 6.9/10 (DC) 7.5/10
IGN	(PC) 8/10 (N64) 7.2/10 (GBC) 6/10 (DC) 6/10
Next Generation	(N64) 3/5
Nintendo Power	(N64) 8/10 (GBC) 5.9/10

The game was met with positive to average reception. GameRankings gave it a score of 75.78% for the Nintendo 64 version; 75.42% for the Dreamcast version; 73.79% for the PC version; and 69.44% for the Game Boy Color version. It has been featured on several lists of the best Star Wars video games. In March 2004, GMR rated Episode I: Racer the fifth-best Star Wars game of all time. In 2015, PC Gamer listed it 3rd in their list of top Star Wars games. That same year, it placed 10th in Rock Paper Shotgun's top Star Wars games list. In Game Informer's 2016 list of the 30 best Star Wars video games, Racer ranked 11th. As of 2011, the game holds the Guinness world record for the best-selling sci-fi racing game, with worldwide sales of 3.12 million units, followed by other series like Wipeout and F-Zero.

Next Generation reviewed the Nintendo 64 version of the game, rating it three stars out of five, and stated that "Yes, it's fast, it's largely customizable, features a lot of options, and it's fun, but it's tough to shake the feeling that if it weren't for the Star Wars license, it wouldn't otherwise stand out."

The editors of Computer Gaming World nominated Racer for their 1999 "Racing Game of the Year" award, which ultimately went to Need for Speed: High Stakes.

During the AIAS' 3rd Annual Interactive Achievement Awards (now known as the D.I.C.E. Awards), Star Wars Episode I: Racer won in the category for "Console Racing Game of the Year". Star Wars Episode I: Racer was also nominated for the Blockbuster Entertainment Award in the "Favorite Nintendo 64 Game" category, although it lost to Donkey Kong 64.

AllGame editor Lisa Karen Savignano gave the Classic Mac OS port a positive review, stating "if you just love racing in general, you will enjoy this game".

== See also ==
- List of Star Wars air, aquatic, and ground vehicles
