= Star Wars: Racer Arcade =

2000 video game

- European arcade flyer
- Developers: Sega-AM5; LucasArts
- Publisher: Sega
- Series: Star Wars
- Platform: Arcade
- Release: JP: June 2000; NA: July 2000; EU: 2000
- Genre: Racing
- Modes: Single-player, multiplayer
- Arcade system: Sega Hikaru

Star Wars: Racer Arcade is a 2000 arcade racing game developed by AM5 and LucasArts, and the final Star Wars game released by Sega. It is based on the Podrace scenes in the 1999 film Star Wars: Episode I – The Phantom Menace.

== Gameplay ==
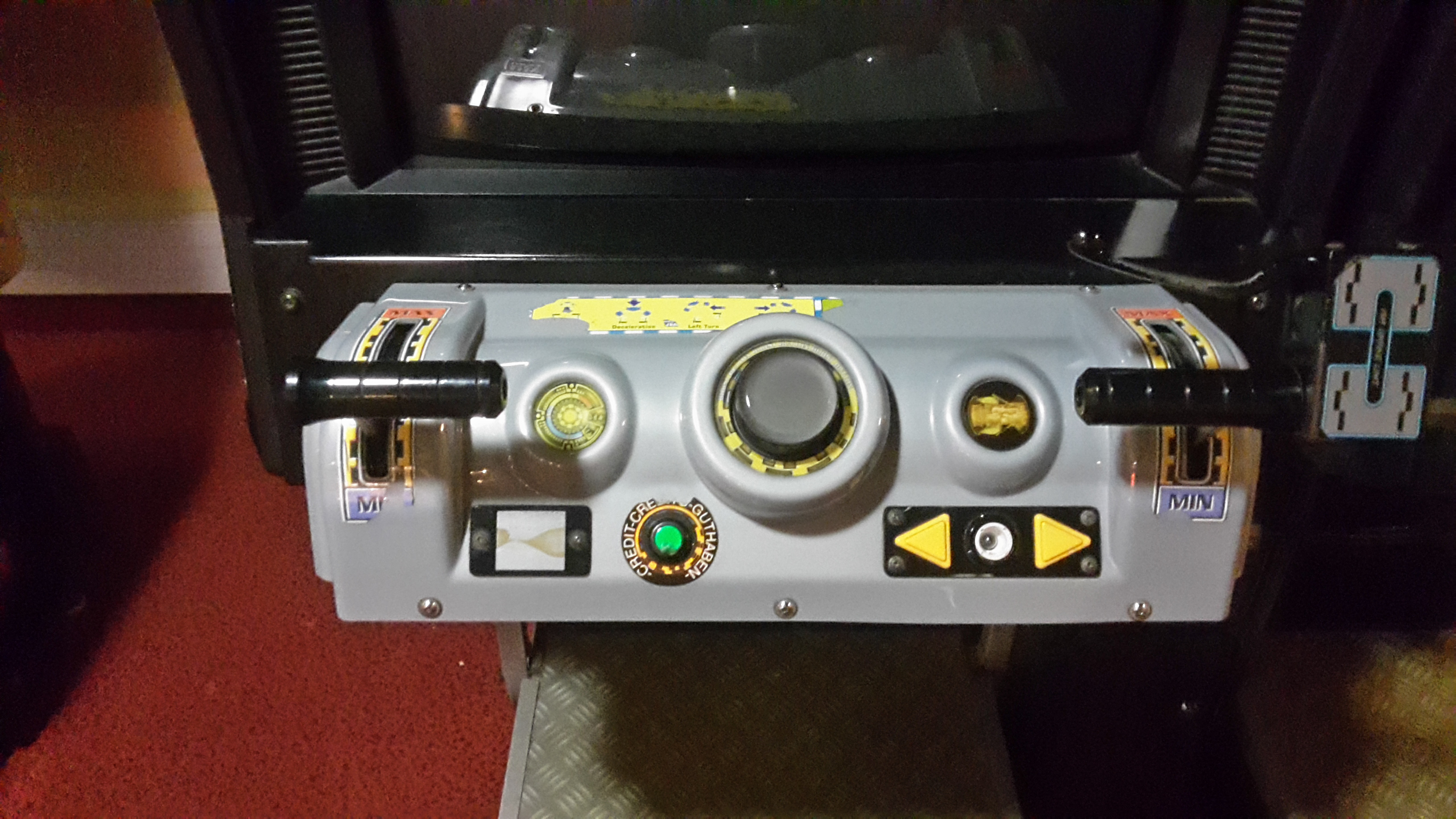
The game is controlled via two throttle controls.

Racer Arcade features four tracks: Tatooine Bantha Tracks (Easy), Etti IV Smuggler's Cove (Normal), Malastare Pixelito Challenge (Hard), which has four laps, and Tatooine Boonta Eve Classic (Expert), which has three laps. Four Podracer pilots are playable: Anakin Skywalker, Ben Quadinaros, Gasgano and Sebulba. The player controls the podracer via two handheld throttle controls, similar to how pods are controlled in the film. Unlike the home console video game Star Wars Episode I: Racer, the player's podracer is indestructible, although it can suffer slowdown from collision damage, and it is possible, yet difficult, to destroy opposing podracers.

== Development and release ==
The game was unveiled at ATEI in London in 2000. It was available in multiple configurations, one of which was a twin type; two individual games joined in the center. The deluxe cabinet featured a 50" screen and was molded to appear like the cockpit of Anakin Skywalker's podracer. Up to four cabinets could be linked for multiplayer.

== Reception ==
In Japan, Game Machine listed Star Wars: Racer Arcade as the fifth most successful dedicated arcade game of August 2000. In a 2020 retrospective, Kotaku's Lewis Packwood called the arcade game a "beefier, fancier-looking version of Episode I: Racer."

== See also ==
- List of Star Wars air, aquatic, and ground vehicles
- Star Wars Trilogy Arcade
- Star Wars Battle Pod
