= Star Wars Racer Revenge =

2002 video game

- European box art
- Developer: Rainbow Studios
- Publisher: LucasArts
- Series: Star Wars
- Platforms: PlayStation 2, PlayStation 4
- Release: NA: February 12, 2002; EU: March 8, 2002
- Genre: Racing
- Modes: Single-player, multiplayer

Star Wars Racer Revenge is a 2002 racing video game developed by Rainbow Studios and published by LucasArts for the PlayStation 2. It is the sequel to Star Wars Episode I: Racer (1999). It was later added digitally to the PlayStation Store for the PlayStation 3 on April 28, 2015, and for the PlayStation 4 on January 15, 2016. On October 18, 2019, the PlayStation 4 version was released physically in both a standard and Collector's Edition in limited quantities by Limited Run Games.

== Gameplay ==
Star Wars Racer Revenge features podracing, as seen in Star Wars: Episode I – The Phantom Menace. Players compete using various characters in championship races throughout the Star Wars universe.

Racer Revenge is a high-speed racing game utilizing podracers, multi-engine chariot-like craft driven by a single pilot. The story centres on the famous racer Sebulba seeking revenge on Anakin Skywalker, eight years after being defeated by him in the Boonta Eve Classic during the events of Star Wars: Episode I – The Phantom Menace.

Players can select one of many characters of varying species, each with their own unique podracer. Attributes for each podracer vary, and include things such as acceleration, top speed, and durability. Races are held throughout the Star Wars universe on many different planets. The player can choose from three different modes to compete with their character. Revenge also departs from its predecessor by employing a form of permadeath by preventing podracers from respawning, meaning that any podracers destroyed in a race are thus eliminated for the rest of the race.

Single Play allows the player to race in one of three ways: Single Event, Practice, or Time Trial. Single Event lets the player race on any unlocked track. They can choose between 1 and 25 laps. Practice lets the player determine how many pods they go up against (from 1 to 8), and Time Trial is just the player against the clock for the best lap time. Tournaments feature races across 13 tracks. The player character must attempt to finish first while destroying as many rival pods as possible. Each race has a total prize for getting first, as well as Watto’s Bribes, which multiplies winnings by a percent, depending on how many pods were destroyed. Each race has a par number of kills, usually 2 or 3, which must be completed in order to completely max out the player's pod's stats. Lastly, two players can compete in a Vs. Race on any unlocked track with any of the unlocked characters.

== Development ==
The game was developed by Rainbow Studios and published by LucasArts. It was released in 2002 for the PlayStation 2, and was added to the PlayStation 4 digital store on January 19, 2016. LucasArts held a public question and answer session on January 24, 2002. Individuals were able to sign up for a public live chat about the game with Dale Geist, the producer on Racer Revenge. Press was given a hands-on demo in May 2001 at the Electronic Entertainment Expo (E3), and at that time the game was estimated to be only 25% complete. LucasArts announced the game had gone gold on February 5, 2002, and it was released in the United States one week later. At E3 2019 distributor Limited Run Games announced that Racer Revenge would be released physically in both a standard and Collector's Edition in limited quantities. The game joined several other titles from the Star Wars franchise in this announcement, including Star Wars Jedi Knight II: Jedi Outcast and Star Wars Jedi Knight: Jedi Academy. It was released on PlayStation 4 on October 18, 2019. This release contained a bug that allowed PlayStation 5 players to inject code while the Hall of Fame menu is open, allowing a jailbreak of the console and causing demand for the game to skyrocket in 2026.

== Reception ==
Reception

Aggregate score
Aggregator	Score
Metacritic	73/100

Review scores
Publication	Score
AllGame	2.5/5
Electronic Gaming Monthly	6.83/10
Game Informer	6.5/10
GamePro	3.5/5
GameRevolution	B−
GameSpot	7.1/10
GameSpy	75%
GameZone	7.8/10
IGN	8.4/10
Official U.S. PlayStation Magazine	4.5/5
X-Play	2/5
Entertainment Weekly	B
Maxim	6/10

Star Wars Racer Revenge received "mixed or average" reviews, according to review aggregator Metacritic.

== See also ==
- List of Star Wars air, aquatic, and ground vehicles
