= Dell XPS laptops =

Line of high-performance laptop computers by Dell

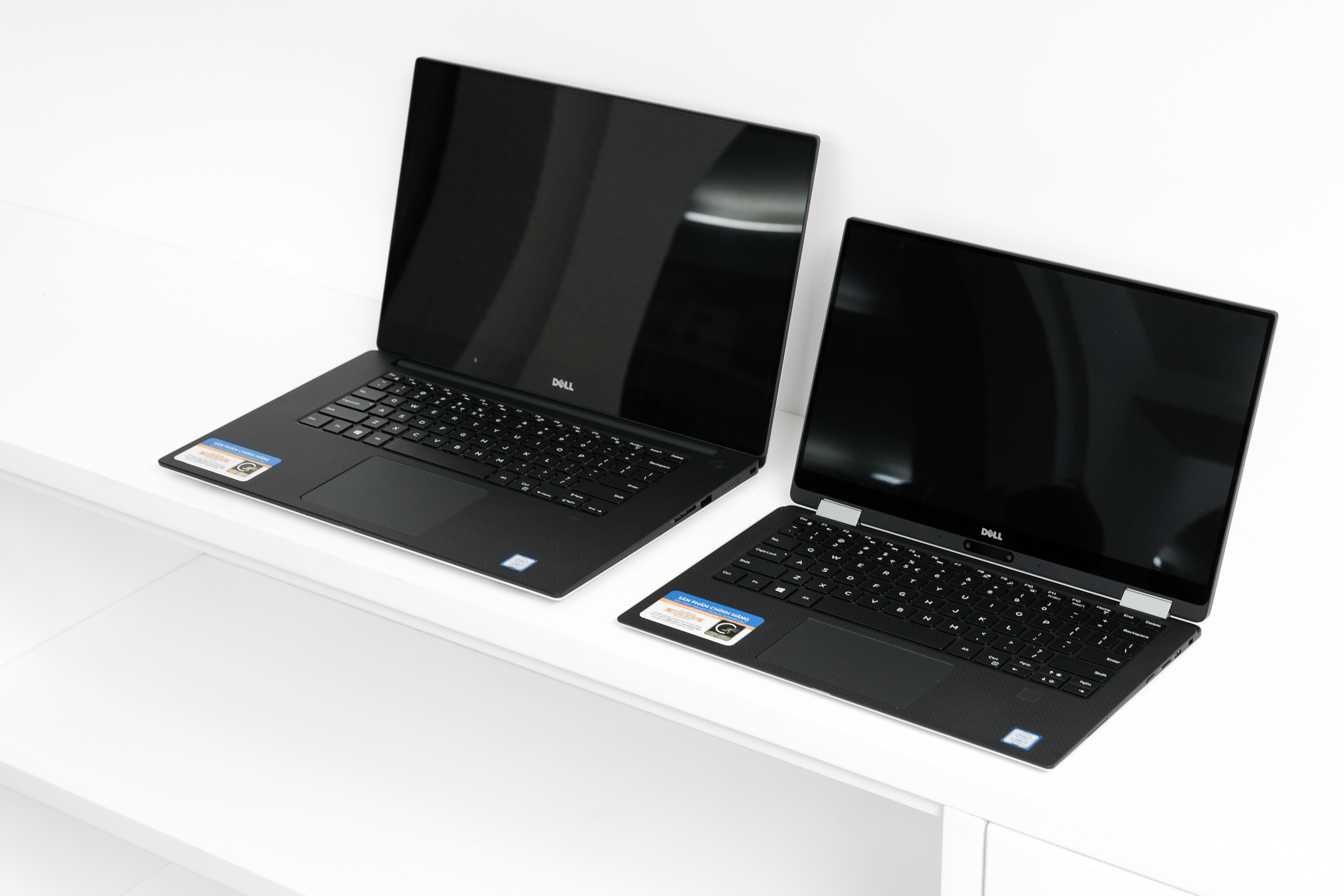
- A Dell XPS 13 and 15 (c. 2017)
- Developer: Dell
- Manufacturer: Dell
- Product family: XPS
- Type: Laptop
- Released: 1993; 33 years ago (as Dimension sub-brand); 2008 (as separate product family)
- Operating system: Windows, Linux
- CPU: Intel, AMD, Qualcomm
- Graphics: Intel/AMD/Qualcomm (integrated); ATI/AMD/Nvidia (discrete)
- Marketing target: Consumer
- Related: Inspiron, Vostro, Latitude
- Website: www.dell.com/xps

XPS laptops are a family of consumer-oriented high-end laptops under the XPS brand, manufactured by Dell Inc..

== Overview ==
Dell returned to develop their XPS performance line in 2010, releasing three new laptops in October of that year, which had many new features and improved specifications compared to previous models. These included JBL speakers with Waves MaxxAudio 3 technology, integrated 3D graphics, the first-ever Skype certification for video chat, and Intel i5 and i7 processors. Dell also offered a software-based X-Fi audio upgrade.

Production overview
	2010	2011	2012	2013	2015	2016	2017	2018	2019	2020	2021	2022	2023	2024	2025	2026
11"				9P33												
12"		9Q23	9Q33	9250												
13"			L321X	L322X, 9333	9343, 9350 (2015)	9360	9365	9370	9380, 7390	9300, 9310	9305	9315, 9320		9340, 9345, 9350 (2024)		DX13260
14"	L401X	L412z	L421X											9440	DA14250	DA14260
15"	L501X	L502X, L511Z	L521X	9530 (2013)	9550		9560	9570, 9575	7590	9500	9510	9520	9530 (2023)			
16"														9640	DA16250	DA16260
17"	L701X	L702X								9700	9710	9720	9730			

== Early models ==
=== Inspiron XPS (2004) ===
This was the very first XPS laptop, initially released under the Inspiron name. It was a very heavy desktop-replacement laptop starting at 9.06 pounds without a power supply (which added 2.5 pounds). This was because it was offered with either a 3.4 GHz desktop Pentium 4 HT "Prescott" processor, or the "Gallatin" Pentium 4 Extreme Edition processor at the same clock speed, which gave off tremendous amounts of heat due to their higher clock speeds and TDP as well as an inefficient microarchitecture, despite a very large copper-based heatsink that spanned the width of the unit with three fans. It came with a 1920x1200 15.4-inch LCD, and a subwoofer integrated into the bottom of the battery casing, with the 12-cell battery (the 16-cell battery variant did not include a subwoofer). Earlier models came with an ATI Mobility Radeon 9700 GPU with 128 MB of memory, and later models the Mobility Radeon 9800 with 256 MB of memory. The Mobility Radeon 9700 was based on the R360 core of the later ATI Radeon 9800 desktop graphics cards, while the Mobility Radeon 9800 was based on the R420 core which was the same core used on the early ATI Radeon X800 desktop graphics cards, but with half the pixel pipelines disconnected. The Inspiron 9100 was similar to this model, which mostly had the same features and chassis as the Inspiron XPS but with different screen resolutions.

A popular modification to the GPU was to bridge two traces in the top right corner of the PCB surrounding the exposed core with a conductive pen to unlock these pipelines. However, this could only be done on cores made before week 43 of 2004. Dell promised graphics card upgradeability, but only delivered the arguably small 9700 to 9800 step for 9700 owners (at a rather steep $399 price tag, including a technician to install it) and never delivered the promised upgrade to the 9800 owners.

It suffered from a whining sound on the headphone and microphone jacks located on the left of the unit. This was because of shared space with the leftmost fan, and the spinning of that fan caused interference. There was no way to fix this other than to otherwise use an external USB, FireWire/1394 or PCMCIA-based audio device or card for sound output as a workaround.

=== Second generation ===
==== Inspiron XPS Gen 2 (2005) ====
The Inspiron XPS Gen 2 was released in early 2005 as the direct successor of the first Inspiron XPS. This replaced the desktop Pentium 4 processor of its predecessor with a mobile Pentium M processor, providing almost the same level of performance as the desktop Pentium 4 at a lower clock rate and TDP. Weight was also significantly reduced to about 8.6 lb compared to 9.06 lb of its predecessor. Due to the use of a mobile processor instead of a desktop one this laptop was thinner and lighter than most other high-performance gaming notebooks of its time and output less heat than desktop processors used prior. It was also more efficient in power and performance than prior desktop processors due to it using a more efficient microarchitecture. It was part of the Intel Centrino platform-marketing brand. It had a design very similar to the later XPS M1710 and featured a 17-inch widescreen display at the same 1920x1200 resolution as the first generation. It used the NVIDIA GeForce 256 MiB 6800 Ultra Go graphics card, which was a Dell exclusive at the time. The whining sound problem of the first Inspiron XPS was gone as the internals were changed to resolve the issue. The Inspiron 9300, itself the successor to the Inspiron 9100, was based on this laptop with the same features and design but with a 1440x900 screen resolution and an ATI Mobility Radeon X300 GPU in the base model.

==== XPS M170 and M140 (2005) ====
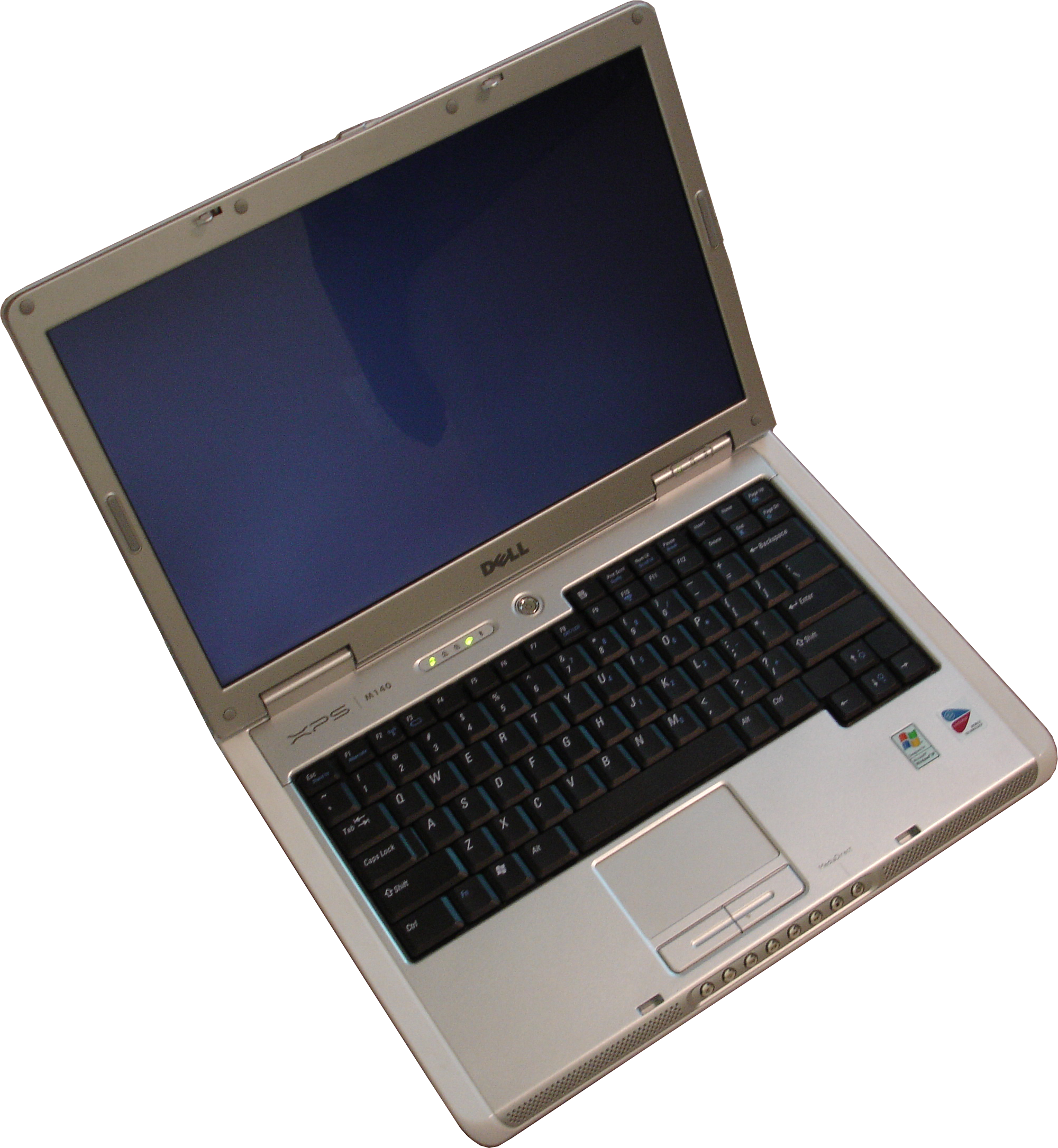
Dell XPS M140

In October of 2005 the Inspiron XPS Gen 2 was rebranded as the XPS M170, and updated to an NVIDIA GeForce Go 7800 GTX graphics card.

In addition, the XPS M140 was released as a lower-end alternative, based on the Dell Inspiron 630m. This model featured a choice of several Intel mobile processors; a 14.1-inch widescreen display; and 512 MiB to 2 GiB of RAM. Being more media-oriented than gaming, it did not feature a dedicated graphics card. It was later replaced with the Inspiron E1405, a 14.1" laptop physically similar, but featuring the newer Intel Core Duo processors and Intel's 945 chipset.

=== Third generation ===
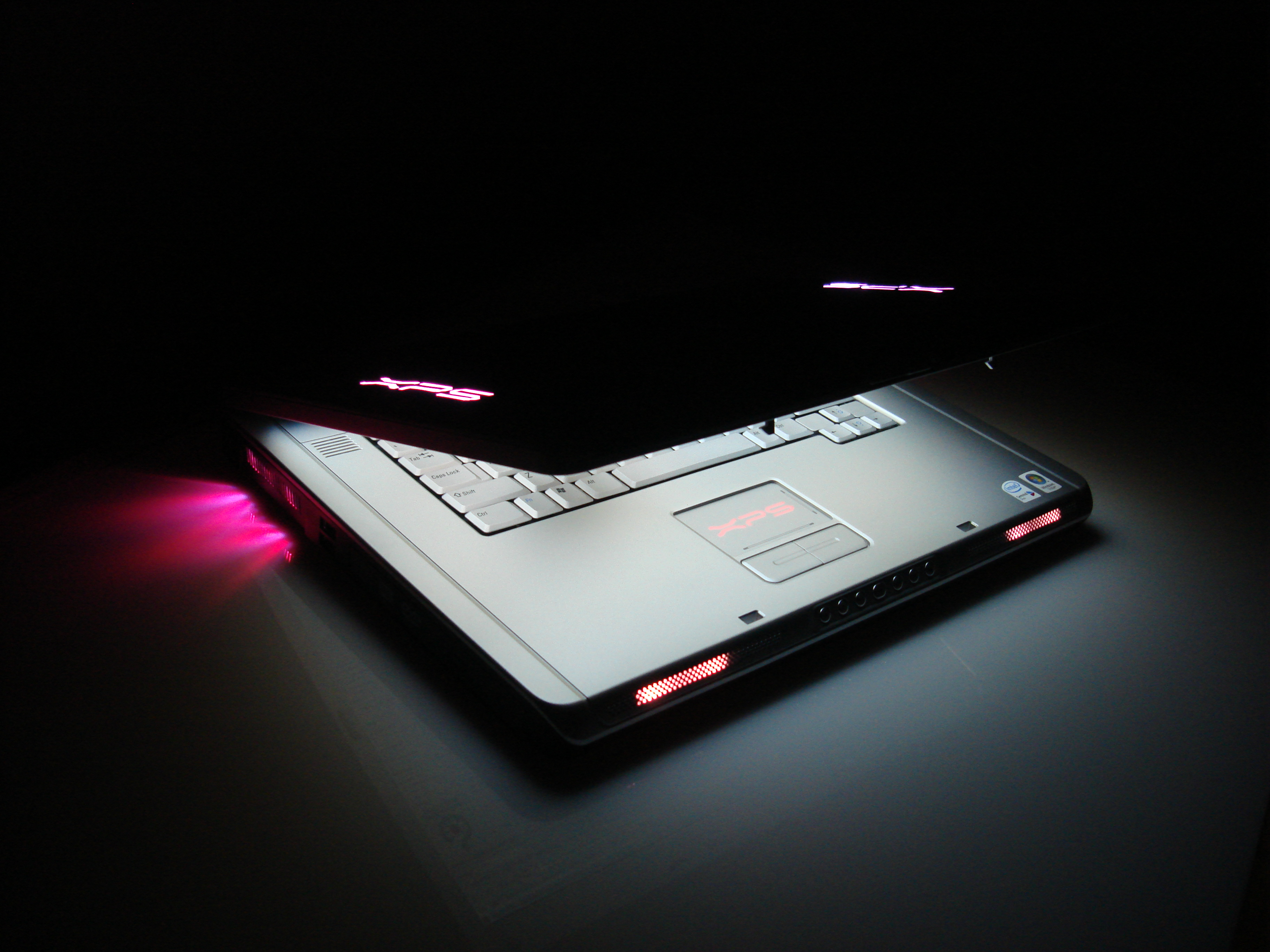
LED lights on the XPS M1710, set to the color "coral"

==== XPS M1210 (2006) ====
The XPS M1210 was a high-performance ultra-portable, 12.1-inch screen notebook featuring a new case design; Intel Core Duo processor technology; an optional dedicated NVIDIA GeForce 7400 Go video card; and an optional integrated 1.3MP webcam. It also had optional WWAN features supporting 3G broadband services. With the standard battery the laptop weighed 1.9 kg. Unlike other 12-inch notebooks the M1210 featured a built-in optical drive rather than an external one.

==== XPS M1710 (2006) ====
The XPS M1710 was announced on April 18, 2006, as a higher-end 17-inch WUXGA TrueLife widescreen XPS desktop replacement, available in black or red. It was marketed to gamers, sharing a chassis design and many components with the lower-end Inspiron E1705/9400 and the Precision M90 mobile workstation. The base design featured an Intel Core Duo processor; NVIDIA GeForce Go 7900 GS or 7900 GTX GPU; 7200 RPM SATA hard drive; DDR2 SDRAM; and a magnesium alloy case including a 1-inch subwoofer complementing the two treble heavy stereo speakers. User configurable multicolor LED lighting was present in the touchpad, fans, speakers and lid with the ability to have them change color/intensity via Dell QuickSet software or via QuickSet plugins to music with bass giving more red-shifted changes and treble more blue-shifted (an SDK developer kit for custom dynamic link libraries could be obtained for integration to many system processes and even games). Technical support was segregated for the XPS line with access to an "exclusive" XPS-branded segment of DELL's business support division. The unit was built on the foundation of a Precision M90 chassis. Later models offered the Core 2 Duo processor, the NVIDIA GeForce 7950 GTX GPU, and optional Blu-ray and/or an unlocked Core 2 Duo processor, which could be overclocked "officially" to 3.16 GHz, although at least 3.5 GHz has been reported as possible. As the mainboard used the Intel 945 chipset, the XPS M1710 could not address more than 3.25 GiB of RAM though Dell specified "up to 4 GB RAM". The chipset, although capable of AHCI operation, was never implemented by Dell, leaving any future SATA hard drive upgrade paths crippled to IDE legacy operation, protocols, and bandwidth. Further evidence of untapped capacity involved the use of replacing the video cards with a Dell Precision Quadro FX 1600M (essentially an 8700M GT with comparable performance to the flagship DX9 7950 Go GTX card), allowing for DirectX 10 functionality in a laptop not designed to do so (with the card being unidentified, but the LCD verified by the BIOS, leaving argument that some design foresight was in place for at least a path to using the Quadro FX 1600 and even FX 3600M in this machine in a BIOS revision).

There were severe overheating problems with the graphics card in this model, and just like the Precision M90, GPU failures due to cracking in the type of solder used on the NVIDIA chipsets to bind them to the substrate were common and settled via a class-action lawsuit with NVIDIA in later years.

==== XPS M2010 (2006) ====
The XPS M2010 was announced on May 31, 2006, as a top-of-the-line briefcase-styled mobile desktop with a 20.1-inch widescreen with a WSXGA+ resolution and TrueLife. The outside of the case had a leather-like appearance. It used an ATI Mobility Radeon X1800 graphics with 256 MiB of graphics memory and had support for dual hard drives. It could be customized with an Intel Core 2 Duo T2500, T5600, T7400 or T7600, and 1, 2 or 4 GiB of DDR2 SDRAM at 667 MHz (Although it could take 2x2 GiB at 677 MHz it would only operate at 3.25 GiB at 500 MHz due to chipset and FSB limitations). It expanded to a full desktop set, including a detachable Bluetooth keyboard, Bluetooth mouse, and radio-frequency Media Center remote. It was praised for the high-quality sound system which included 8 separate ¾" speakers below the screen and a 1¾" subwoofer on the bottom of the machine, ported to the right-hand side. While it could be folded and carried as a briefcase with its built-in carrying handle, at 18.3 lb it was generally considered too heavy to be a true desktop replacement.

=== Fourth generation ===
==== XPS M1330 (2007) ====
This 13.3-inch high-end laptop, released on June 26, 2007, featured the Santa Rosa platform. The screen was either CCFL or WLED backlit. The WLED-backlit version had a 0.3MP camera, as opposed to the 2MP camera with the CCFL screen, but the variant with WLED screen was thinner and brighter than the previous XPS 1210. Moreover, the it could also feature a biometric fingerprint reader, usually only found in business-class laptops like the Latitude series. It also offered the NVIDIA GeForce Go 8400M GS graphics card as an option. Originally it could only be configured with Intel Core 2 Duo mobile processors up to T7700 (2.4 GHz), but could later be configured with processors up to the Intel Core 2 Duo T9500. It was noted for its light weight of only 1.8 kg. It was also available in Dell's product red line (see below).

The XPS M1330 was replaced by the M1340 (Studio XPS 13).

The most reported issue with M1330 laptops was overheating. Dell became aware of the problem and found that it was limited to NVIDIA chip production (G84- and G86-GPU's). As a result the BIOS was updated to A12, which improves thermal control but does not prevent it from reoccurring. This problem resulted from the chip material used by NVIDIA not being capable of withstanding high temperatures. This problem was exacerbated by poor thermal contact between the chip and the heat pipe (the gap was too big). Some overcame the problem by fashioning a heat sink using a copper plate and thermal paste to fill the gap between the heat pipe and the graphics chip.

Several cases were also reported of cosmetic defects in manufacturing, such as loose hinge covers and unusually uneven gaps between plastic parts, along with customer complaints concerning "CPU whine".

==== XPS M1530 (2007) ====
This 15.4-inch laptop, released on November 28, 2007, featured the Santa Rosa platform. It was almost identical in design to the XPS M1330 except that it had 4 different colours (blue, black, pink and red) and it was a bit thicker and heavier with a 15.4-inch CCFL or LED screen. It could be configured with Intel Core 2 Duo mobile processors T7800 (2.6 GHz), T9500 (2.6 GHz, 6 MiB L2 cache), or X9000 (2.8 GHz); up to 8 GiB DDR2 SDRAM at 667 MHz; up to 320 or 500 GB 5400 rpm, or faster 160, 240 or 320 GB 7200 rpm HDD, or an optional 128 GB SSD; and could be configured with a 128 MiB DDR2 GeForce 8400GS or 256 MiB DDR3 8600M GT GPU. Pre-standardized 802.11n wifi ("draft-n") was also available. It included a biometric fingerprint reader, and a 2MP webcam. Another option was a glossy 1920x1200 display, even though it was 9 inches smaller than Dell's 24 inch monitor. The system weight started at 2.62 kg (5.78 lbs) and is dependent upon configuration. It also contained an internal slot for a Dell mobile broadband card.

The XPS M1530 is no longer available for purchase on Dell's website as of early August 2009. Dell became aware that the problem was limited to NVIDIA chip production, the BIOS was updated to A12 which improves thermal control but does not prevent it from reoccurring. The problem associated with NVIDIA GPUs was the chip material used could not stand high temperatures.

==== XPS M1730 (2007) ====
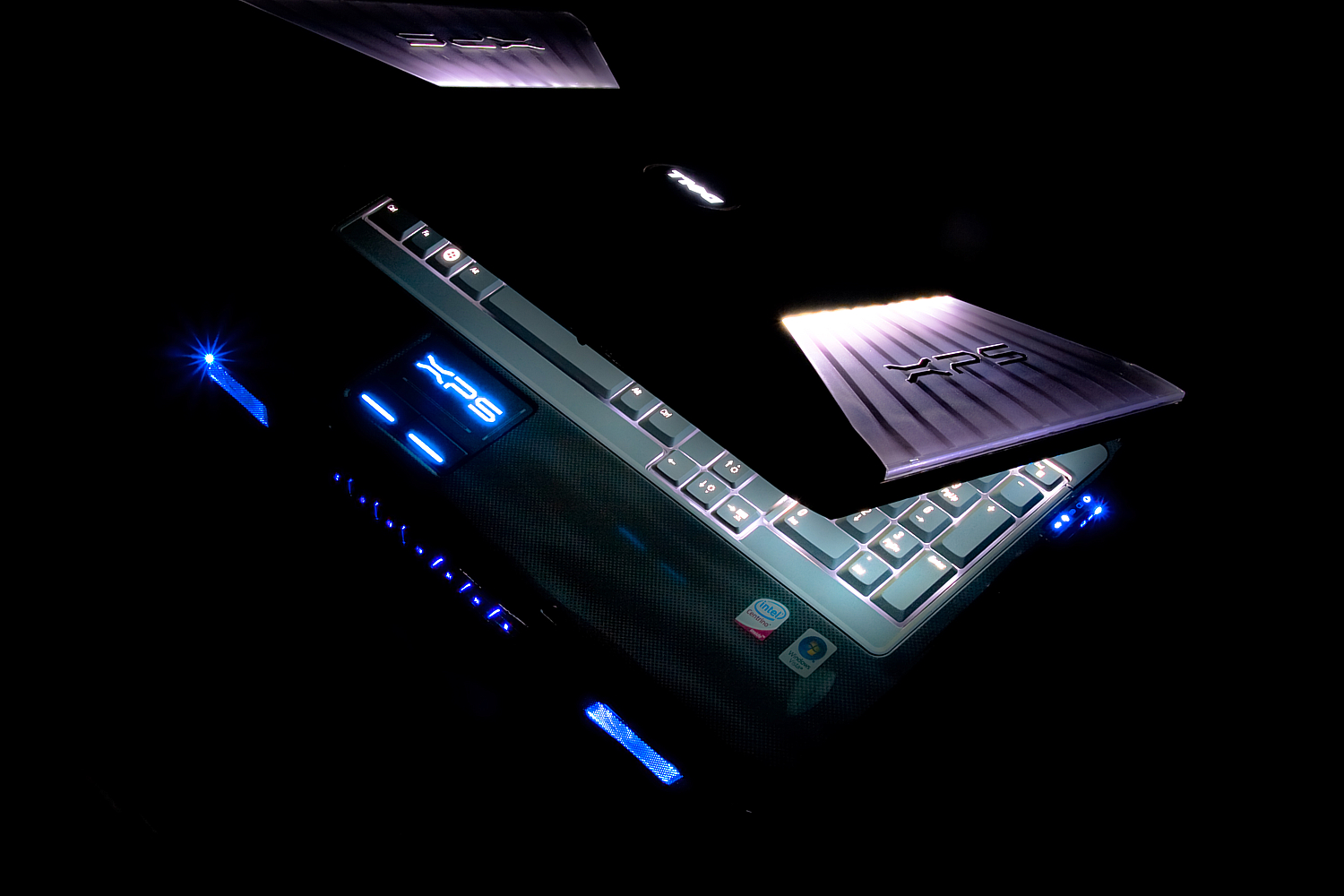
Dell XPS M1730, known for LED lighting effects.

The XPS M1730 was announced on October 5, 2007. Compared to its predecessor, the XPS M1710, the model M1730 was physically redesigned with a completely new chassis available in grey, white, blue, or red. Like the M1710, the M1730 offered unique user- and software-changeable LED lighting in the touchpad, fan outlets/inlets, as well as the lid and speaker grilles. Also like its predecessor, it featured a 17-inch widescreen. From the components angle, it supported overclockable Intel Core 2 Extreme processors (2.8 GHz to 3.4 GHz overclocked via the X7900 or X9000 Processor); dual NVIDIA GeForce 9800M GTX video cards in SLI; up to two 7200 RPM SATA hard drives available in RAID; and up to 8 GiB DDR2 SDRAM. A Blu-ray Disc Drive was an option in some models. New with this version was a built-in optional AGEIA physics card to enable PhysX enhanced titles to take advantage of hardware accelerated physics, the option for 64 GB solid state drives, a back lit keyboard including a number pad, and a Logitech gaming LCD above the keyboard.

The M1730 was criticized for its increase in weight and size compared to previous models, and for having only marginal performance gains in select games. The latter complaint is likely due to a late NVIDIA release of a mobile version of the 8800M video card which Dell added to the list of options following the release of the M1730.

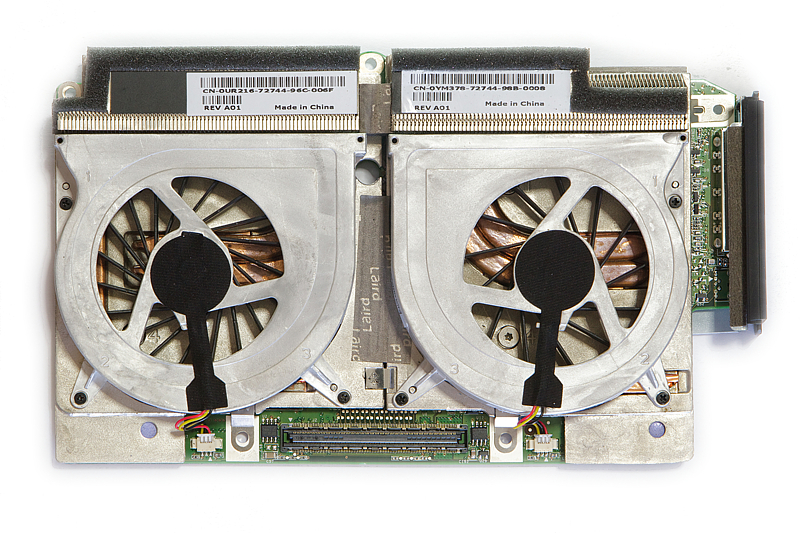
Top view of the M1730 9800M GTX SLI 1 GiB VRAM graphics card

Following the initial release of the M1730, the option to have dual 8800M GTX graphics cards in SLI was made available. This was said to have a 174% power increase (as quoted by Dell) over the dual 8700M GTs in SLI which were previously the highest available option. Later, an option to have dual 9800M GT and 9800M GTX graphics cards in SLI has been added to the line.

The 9800M GTX SLI was the highest supported graphics card, with 1 GiB GDDR3 VRAM (as opposed to the 9800M GT SLI and 8800M GTX SLI having only 512 MB), and a slightly higher number of stream processors. Availability of the 9800M GTX SLI was rare.

=== Fifth generation (Studio XPS) ===
In 2009 new models were released which combined the XPS brand with that of Studio as Studio XPS. With regard to the Studio line, the XPS moniker was intended to distinguish them as being at the higher end of the Studio range.

==== Studio XPS 13 M1340 (2009) ====
The Studio XPS 13,released in January 2009, was similar to the Studio XPS 16, but was trimmed down for a 13.3-inch 720p 16:10 aspect ratio screen. It had an illuminated keyboard and included leather accents on the lid. Its body was piano black and silver.

Graphics options were the integrated NVIDIA 9400M G (same as used in the MacBook Air and 13-inch MacBooks) and the more powerful NVIDIA GeForce 9500M GE (which was composed of an integrated GeForce 9400M G and discrete GeForce 9200M GS with 256 MB of GDDR3 memory). When configured with the 9500M GE you could switch between the 9400M G running standalone and the 9400M G with the 9200M GS in Windows Vista, without logging out and back in like you must with Apple products due to the availability of Hybrid SLI.

- Processor: Intel Core 2 Duo P7350, P8600, P8700, P8800, P9500, P9600 or P9700.
- Memory: 3, 4, 6, or 8 GiB of shared dual channel DDR3 SDRAM at 1066 MHz.
- Chipset: NVIDIA 730i
- Graphics: integrated NVIDIA GeForce 9400M G with 256 MB of graphics memory, or integrated 9400M + discrete GeForce 9200M (referred to officially as a "9500M").
- Display: 13.3" Edge-to-Edge with CCFL-backlit, 1280x800 resolution or 13.3" Edge-to-Edge with LED-backlit, 1280x800 resolution and TrueLife.
- Storage: 250 GB, 320 GB or 500 GB SATA 7200 RPM HDD, or 256 GB SATA SSD
- Optical Drive: 8X slot-load dual-layer DVD+/-RW drive or 2X tray-load Blu-ray Disc Combo drive.
- Battery: 6-cell (56 Wh) or 6-cell (56 Wh) w/additional 9-cell (85 Wh) Lithium-ion battery.
- Camera: 1.3 MP or 2 MP webcam.
- Wi-Fi Card: Dell Wireless 1510 802.11a/b/g/draft/n half-mini card.
- Bluetooth: Dell Wireless Bluetooth Internal 370 (2.1 EDR).
- I/O ports: 1 USB 2.0 port, 1 USB/eSATA Combo port, 1 Gigabit Ethernet port, 1 VGA output, 1 HDMI output, 1 DisplayPort output, 2 headphone jack, 1 microphone jack, 1 54 mm Express Card slot, 1 8-in-1 memory card reader, 1 IR receiver and 1 power adapter connector.

==== Studio XPS 16 M1640 (2009) ====
Model M1640 was a larger version of the Studio XPS 13 M1340. They launched together in early January 2009. It sported an Intel Core 2 Duo processor, with an Intel PM45 chipset and up to 4 GiB of RAM. Choice of CD/DVD ROM, DVD+/- RW, or Blu-ray ROM drives were available. It had an illuminated keyboard, and the case featured optional genuine leather, aluminum accents, and magnesium alloy, coming in three high-gloss colors — Obsidian Black, Arctic White and Merlot Red.

Graphics processing was handled via either an ATI Mobility Radeon HD 4670, or HD 565v, integrated graphics chip (with 512 MiB or 1 GiB GDDR3 video memory with the HD 4670; 1 GiB DDR3 with the HD 565v). The earliest units may have shipped with an ATI Mobility Radeon HD 3670 (with 512 MiB).

Three different choices of 'edge-to-edge' widescreen displays were offered — WLED backlit 16" WXGA (1366x768); WLED backlit 15.6" FHD (1920x1080); and RGBLED backlit 16" FHD (1920x1080). Notably, the 1080p RGBLED variant was widely considered the best display on any laptop then in the market. The earliest units may have had a 720p display option, as referenced by some early reviewers. By February 2010, a WLED-backlit 15.6" HD+ (1600x900) option had also become available.

==== Studio XPS 16 M1645 (2009) ====
Model M1645, released in October 2009, updated the M1640 with the Intel Core i7 Clarksfield processor, Intel PM55 chipset, a larger maximum RAM size of 8 GiB, and the option of an ATI Mobility Radeon HD 5730 (with 1 GiB of video memory).

Some systems were found to have throttling issues when demanding applications like games were run on them. Dell was able to provide a fix for the issue with the help of community input. The fix involved bios updates and a more powerful AC adapter.

==== Studio XPS 16 M1647 (2009) ====
Model M1647, released in early 2010, further updated the 16" model with additional Intel Core i3, i5, and i7 Clarksfield and Arrandale processor options.

== XPS 11 series ==
=== XPS 11 9P33 (2013) ===
Dell announced the XPS 11 in June 2013. It featured an 11.6-inch screen that could be folded backwards almost 360 degrees to act as a tablet. It shipped with Windows 8.1 and a "Haswell" Intel Core i5 processor.

== XPS 12 series ==
=== XPS 12 9Q23, aka L221X (2012) ===
The XPS 12 was a convertible laptop. It mirrored the general aesthetic of the Dell XPS 13 Ultrabook and other models in the XPS lineup, though it swapped out its predecessors' aluminum look for a carbon-fiber exterior. The lid and exterior edge were framed by a machined aluminum edge, while the interior consisted of a magnesium-alloy palm rest coated in matte black paint. Its body was made with a fingerprint-resisting coating. It possessed a hinged, flip-screen LCD. Applying a push to the top of the screen freed the 12.5" 1920x1080 400-nit display from magnetic locks that held it in place. It sported either a 3rd generation Intel Core i5 ULV or i7 ULV processor, with Intel HD 4000 integrated graphics, combined with 4 or 8 GiB of RAM and an mSATA SSD.

=== XPS 12 9Q33 (2013) ===
In July 2013 Dell released model 9Q33 with an Intel Haswell (4th Generation) processor. This upgrade came as a boost in the Ultrabook's performance as well as battery life. Dell also added near field communication in this device.

=== XPS 12 9250 (2015) ===
In 2015 Dell released model 9250 with Intel Skylake Core M processors. The hinge system was removed and replaced with a fully detachable display. The device has a 4K Ultra HD (3860x2160) display, a kickstand, an 8MP rear camera, and a 5MP front camera. The new XPS 12 has an all-metal build from the new XPS 13.

== XPS 13 series ==
=== XPS 13 L321X (2012) ===
The Dell XPS 13 was unveiled at CES 2012. It was the company's first Ultrabook, a term coined by Intel. The XPS 13 featured a 13.3-inch screen (1366x768 Non-Touch Corning Gorilla Glass) and used flash memory to help with fast booting. It featured certain unique design elements. The edges were rounded and the bottom was made of carbon fiber, with a gentle silicone surface treatment. A battery level indicator was also present and is functional when powered off. The Intel Chipset was a second-generation I-series.

Dell also offered a "developer edition" running Ubuntu Linux.

=== XPS 13 L322X (2013) ===
The L322X model was a slightly heavier revision of the L321X, released in early 2013. Difference with the previous model included: 4-8 DDR3L RAM, up to 1600 MHz; Mobile Intel 7-series express chipset QS77 (Panther Point, 3rd generation I-series); Intel HD 4000 graphics instead of 3000; two USB 3.0 ports; an upgraded wireless card; and a 13.3-inch HD WLED, HD/FHD TrueLife with Gorilla glass LCD.

=== XPS 13 9333 (2013) ===
Model 9333, released in late 2013, featured a 13.3" LED-backlit touchscreen display boasting a resolution of 1920x1080, reinforced with Corning Gorilla Glass for enhanced durability. Powered by either an Intel Core fourth-generation i5-4200U or i7-4500U processor, complete with an integrated chipset and Intel HD 4400 Graphics, it operated on the Windows 8.1 (64-bit) platform. Memory options included 4 or 8 GiB of Dual Channel DDR3 1600 MHz RAM, with storage capacities of 128 or 256 GB mSATA SSD. Connectivity was facilitated through the utilization of Intel Dual Band Wireless-AC 7260 + Bluetooth wireless technology. Powering the device was a 55 WHr 6-Cell Battery.

A recurring issue with this model was a persistent high-pitched noise emanating from the right-hand side of the keyboard area.

=== XPS 13 9343 (2015) ===
Model 9343 was announced at CES and released in January 2015. It used Intel Broadwell processors and a renovated 3200x1800 touchscreen of 13.3" set in a very thin frame, and claimed up to 15 hours of battery life along with many other upgrades over the previous model.

=== XPS 13 9350 (2015) ===
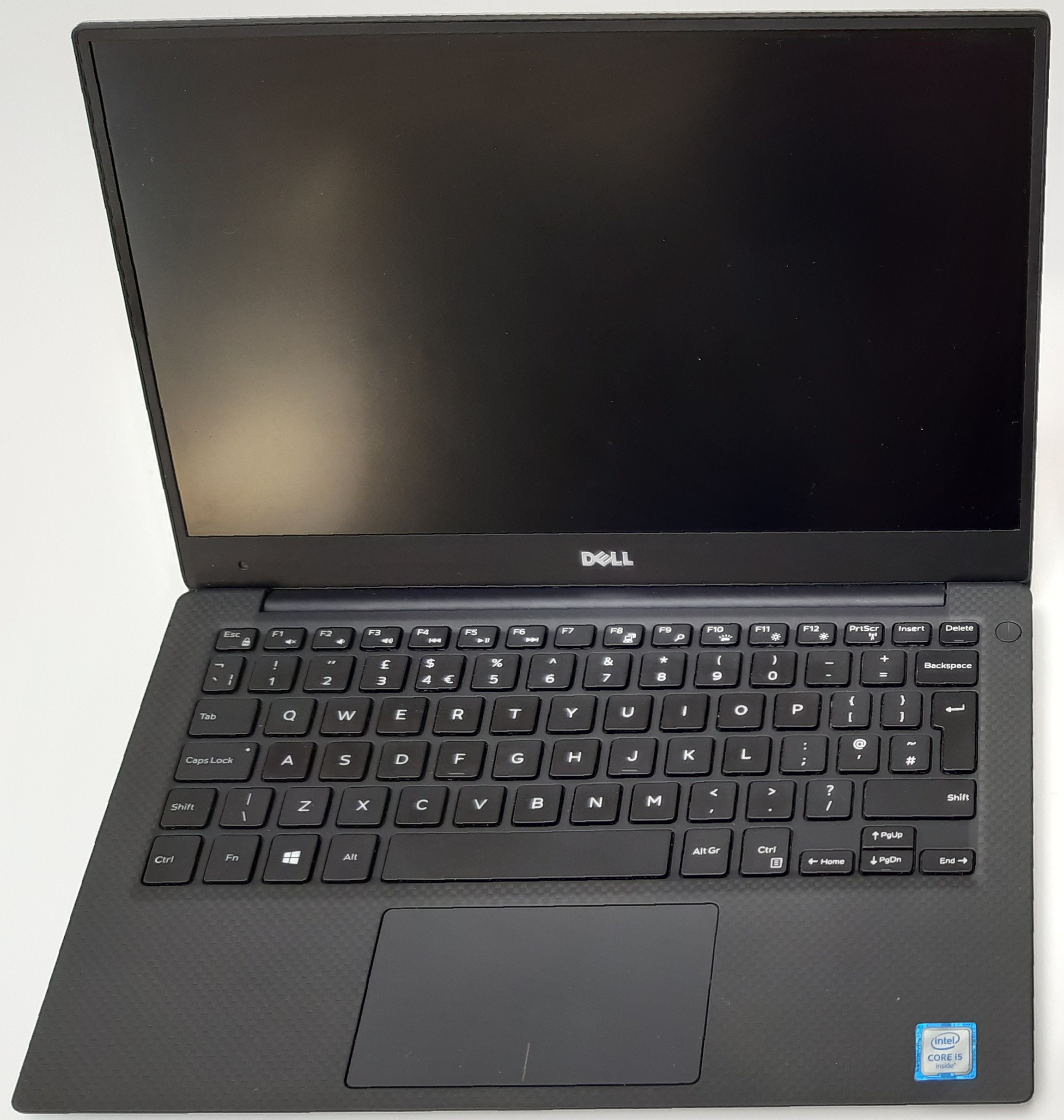
Dell XPS 13 9350 (2015)

Released in October 2015, the 9350 model was similar to the 9343 but featured the new Intel Skylake processor (6th generation I-series), and a Thunderbolt 3 (with USB 3.1 Gen 2 support) port instead of the mini-DisplayPort. There was also another variant with i7-6560 CPU and Iris 540 graphics released later for better graphics performance. One of the biggest improvements was an increase in available integrated RAM to 16 GiB DDR3L (in highest versions). It was criticized for the placement of the webcam in the bottom bezel.

(Not to be confused with the model 9350 from 2024).

=== XPS 13 9360 (2016) ===
Model 9360 was released in October 2016. It was similar to the 9350 but brought the new Intel Kaby Lake processor (7th generation U-series) or, in some models from late 2017 onwards, Intel's 8th generation (Kaby Lake-R) U-series processors. A "developer edition" came preloaded with Ubuntu 18.04 LTS.

=== XPS 13 '2-in-1' 9365 (2017) ===
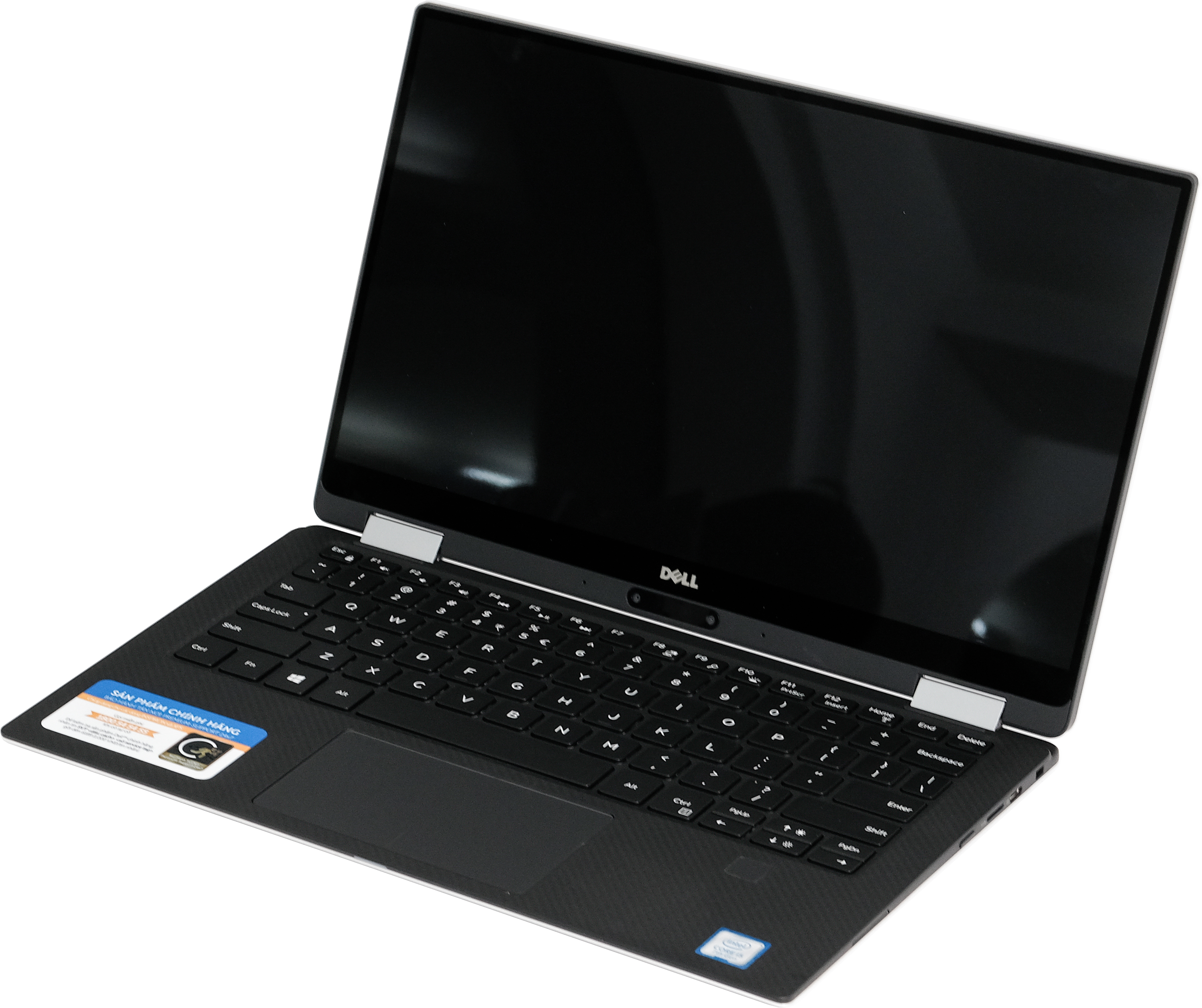
Dell XPS 13 9365

The 9365 was similar to model 9360 but with a flexible hinge allowing it to fold over into tablet mode. It also featured face-recognition for logging in. Minor keyboard layout changes were also made, affecting the location of Print-Screen, Insert, Home, End, Up/Down screen brightness, and Up/Down page functions, with a pair of new keys being added for Up/Down page functionality above the left and right arrow keys. These keyboard layout changes persisted into subsequent standard models.

=== XPS 13 9370 (2018) ===
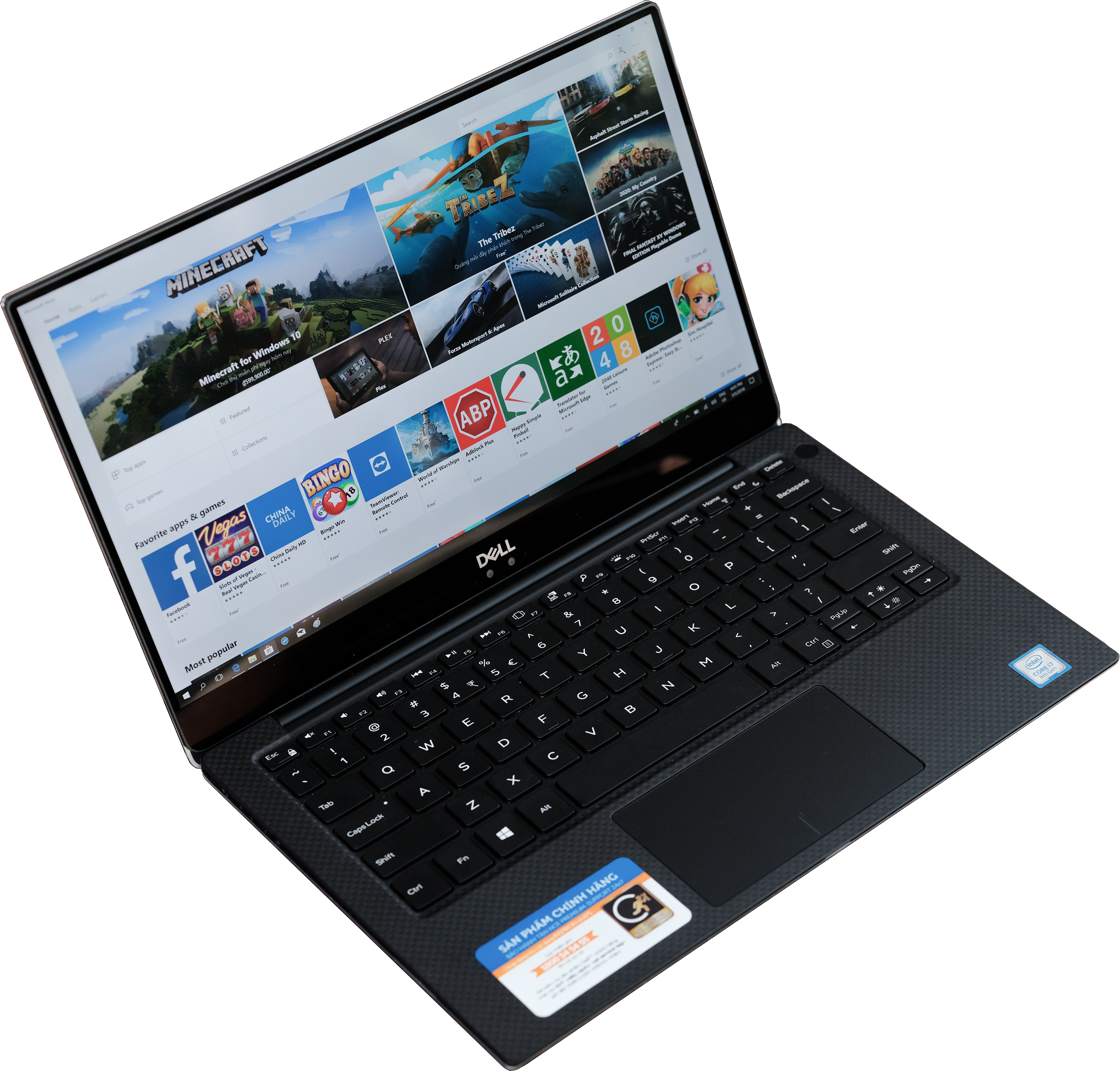
Dell XPS 13 9370

Released in January 2018, model 9370 had an entirely new design refresh, with a smaller footprint and lighter chassis. The battery capacity dropped from 60 watt-hours to 52 watt-hours, most likely due to the smaller form factor. This refresh used Intel's 8th generation Core processors (Kaby Lake R) and started at US$999, $200 more than the 9360. The Intel 8th generation processors used in this version met the requirements for upgrading to Windows 11. Dell dropped the barrel-style power connector in favor of USB-C charging, as well as dropping the provision USB-A ports. It included two Thunderbolt 3 ports, a microSD card reader, one USB-C port, and one headphone jack. Dell is also offered a variant in white, which used a different palm rest material than the previous carbon fiber palm rest and deck than on the 9360.

=== XPS 13 9380 (2019) ===
Released in January 2019, model 9380 had the webcam moved back above its screen. Two Thunderbolt 3 ports, a micro SD card reader, one USB-C port, and one headphone jack were again provided, as with the 9370. This refresh used Intel's 8th generation Core i3-8145U, i5-8265U, and i7-8565U Whiskey Lake processors. The cheapest variant started at $949 (USD) with the i3 processor and only 4 GB of RAM, while the most expensive variant was $1,659 (USD) with the i7 processor.

=== XPS 13 '2-in-1' 7390 (2019) ===
Model 7390, launched in August 2019, was another foldable "2-in-1", like the previous 9365. It was one of the first in the line-up to be offered with a 10th generation 10 nm Intel Ice Lake processor with Intel Iris Plus integrated graphics. It had a new 13.4-inch screen with an aspect ratio of 16:10. The SSD was soldered to the motherboard, preventing easy upgrades or replacements. Unlike the 9365, which was 'silent and fanless', this model had two fans for active cooling.

=== XPS 13 7390 (2019) ===
Following the launch of the '2-in-1' model 7390, a refreshed non-foldable model was released under the same model number. It offered a new 10th generation 14 nm Comet Lake processor, up to a 6-core i7-10710U with Intel UHD 610 integrated graphics. It was physically identical to the 9380 model.

=== XPS 13 9300 (2020) ===
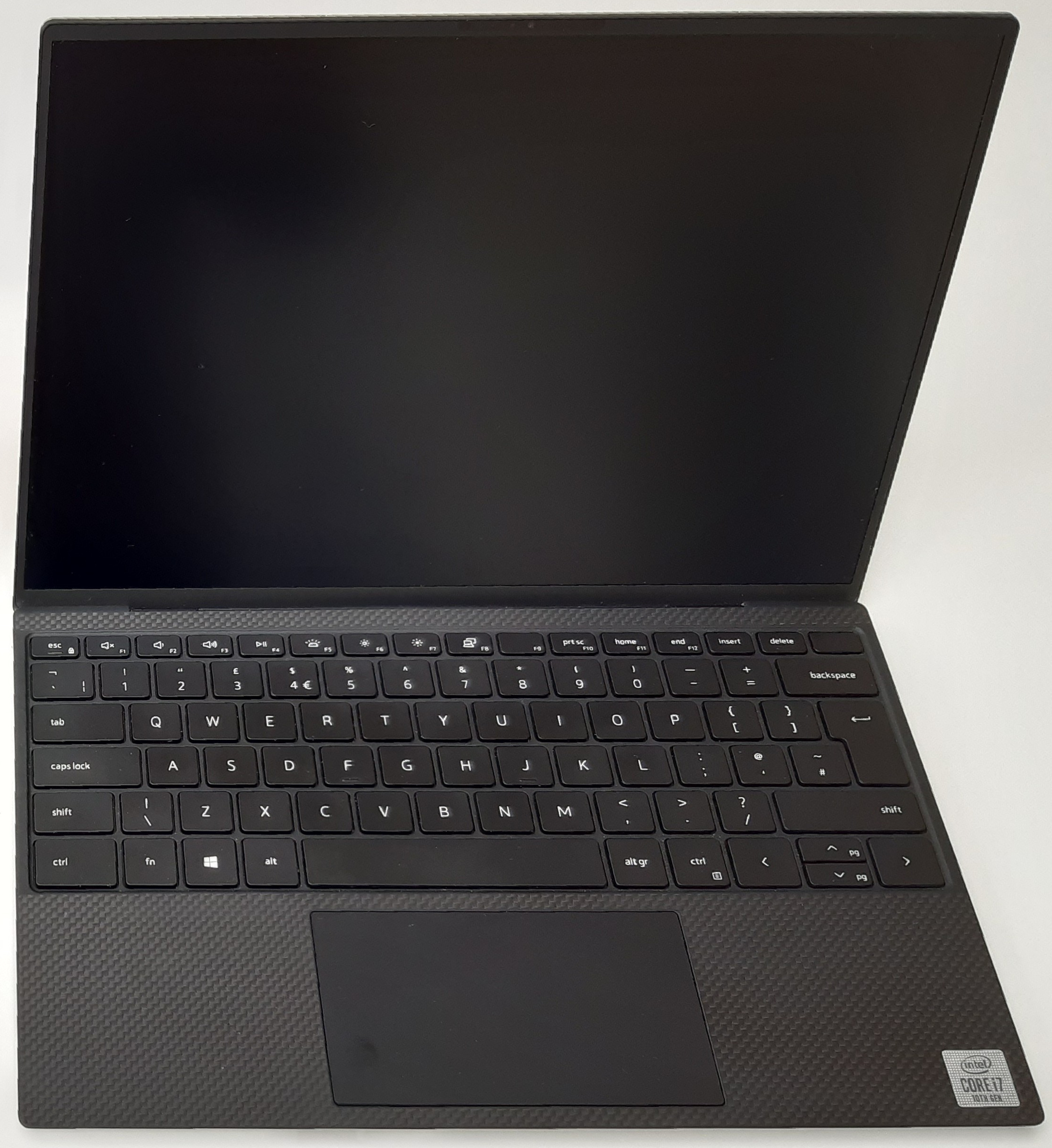
Dell XPS 13 9300

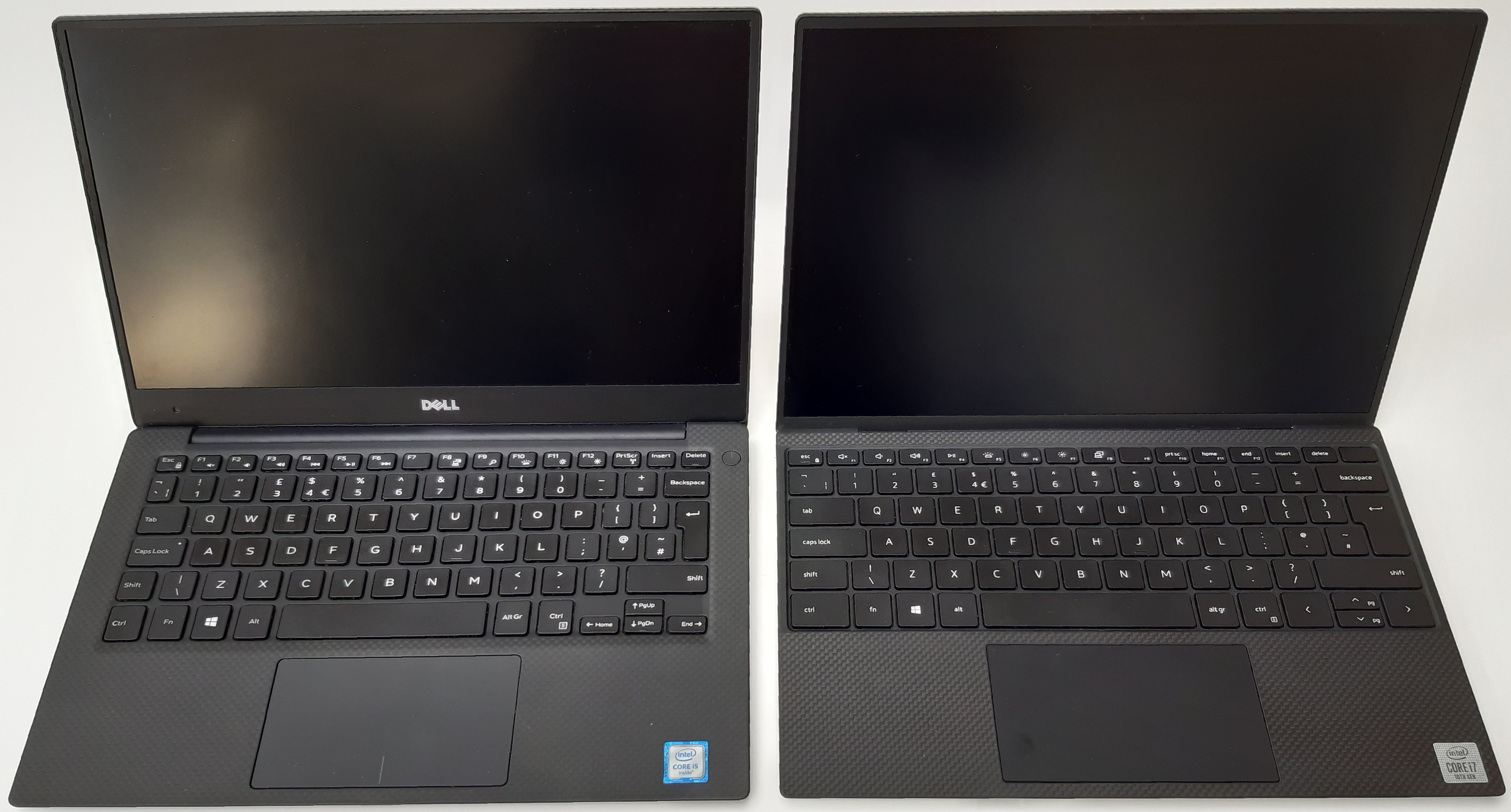
Dell XPS 13 model 9350 (2015) (left) next to the newer model 9300 (right). The 9300 is slightly smaller than the 9350 (2015), although its screen, touchpad and keys are larger.

Model 9300, like the 7390, updated to the new 10th generation 10 nm Intel Ice Lake processors, offering up to an i7-1065G7. It featured a new 13.4" inch screen with an aspect ratio of 16:10, and a front-facing webcam supporting Windows Hello facial recognition. Compared to model 7390 it had a better battery life, a larger touchpad, and larger keys, albeit with slightly reduced travel. The space either side of the keyboard was slimmed down such that the keyboard was almost edge-to-edge, and consequently the power button was moved to a new (unlabelled) key in the top-right corner of the keyboard. This new power key included a built-in fingerprint scanner for biometric login. Further minor keyboard layout changes were made, most notably dropping the dedicated Up/Down page keys in favour of full-sized left and right arrow keys. It was launched during CES 2020.

=== XPS 13 9310 (2020) ===
Model 9310 was released on September 30, 2020 in the USA and Canada. It had the same chassis as the previous generations and featured Intel's new 11th generation 10 nm Tiger Lake processors, along with support for Thunderbolt 4.

=== XPS 13 '2-in-1' 9310 (2020) ===
A '2-in-1' model 9310 was released alongside the standard 9310 on September 30, 2020 in USA and Canada. It had almost the same build as the previous 7390 '2-in-1', but the weight had decreased to 2.8 pounds from 2.9, and the keyboard layout had been tweaked. It featured Intel's new 11th generation 10 nm Tiger Lake processors, which use Intel's improved Intel Iris Xe integrated graphics. As with the 7390 '2-in-1', the SSD was soldered-in.

=== XPS 13 9305 (2021) ===
Model 9305, released in mid-2021, used a 16:9 aspect ratio screen based upon the Intel 11th gen i5 and i7 processors. While similar to the 9310, the 9305 included an additional USB-C port (3 in total) and utilized an earlier generation chassis (model 9370) with a narrower keyboard (2019 era). The 9305 was intended to be a lower cost model, with the screen only coming in 1080p resolution, a maximum of 16 GB of RAM, and maximum storage of 512 GB.

=== XPS 13 'Plus' 9320 (2022) ===
Model 9320 represented the first substantial redesign of the XPS 13 chassis, and carried a $300 higher price point relative to the 9315 released the same year. The chassis redesign used a latticeless keyboard style (minimal spacing between keys); extended the keyboard to the full width of the laptop; replaced the traditional function key row (including delete key) with a controversial row of non-programmable capacitive touch points (to widen the hinge points and allow for better cooling); incorporated a haptic-based trackpad seamlessly and invisibly into a glass-covered palm rest; and removed the headphone jack and card reader (though a USB-C headphone adapter was provided), leaving just two USB-C ports (with Thunderbolt 4, DisplayPort 1.4, and Power Delivery support) for charging and extensibility. The keyboard-based power button placement, with a built-in fingerprint reader, was retained from prior models. The wifi card (wifi 6e, bluetooth 5.2) was soldered to the motherboard, leaving only the SSD as upgradable/replaceable. A pair of downward-facing speakers were paired with a second pair facing upwards beneath the keyboard. The dual fans were also made larger, providing more airflow. It was available in two color schemes, Platinum or Graphite. It featured 12th Gen Alder Lake-P Intel Core processors at 28W TDP; a larger 55-watt hour 3-cell battery; and either an FHD+ (1920x1200) 100% sRGB 500-nit IPS, UHD+ (3840x2400) 90% DCI-P3 500-nit IPS, or 3.5K (3456x2160) 100% DCI-P3 400-nit OLED, all being 16:10 ratio touchscreens, with the option of FHD+ in non-touch.

Despite these design changes to accommodate the high 28W TDP, various reviewers noticed significant warmth during normal usage. The higher TDP likely also contributed to lower battery life. Another annoyance for some was the capacitive touchbar, especially due to the fact that it was always illuminated and the refresh rate could be low enough to notice flickering under certain conditions.

In 2023 the specs were updated to the Intel 13th-gen Core P platform, under the same model number.

=== XPS 13 9315 (2022) ===
Model 9315 presented an alternative to the 9320 'plus' model, retaining the older principle design features of past models such as the 9310. It featured a 13.4" 16:10 screen, 12th Gen Alder Lake-U Intel Core processors at a lower 15W TDP, and a 51-watt-hour, three-cell battery.

Adjustments were made to expansion from previous generations of this design, with removal ofthe headphone jack and card reader, leaving just two Thunderbolt 4 ports, though a USB-C to headphone jack adapter was included. It was available in full Sky or Umber colours. A single fan was included for cooling, with no air intake grill at the bottom. Like the '2-in-1'models, the M.2-based SSD was soldered to the motherboard and thus not upgradeable or replaceable.

The XPS 13 9315 received mixed to generally negative reviews, with some reviewers noting poor CPU performance compared to alternatives, worse keyboards and touchpads than the previous 9300/9310 design, a poor port selection with no 3.5 mm headphone jack, its 720p 30 fps webcam and the lack of user-replaceable components, including the SSD.

=== XPS 13 9340 (2024) ===
Model 9340 took the "experimental" redesign of the 9320 'Plus' model mainstream, retiring the old carbon-fibre based design last seen in the 9315. Changes from model 9320 included a spec bump to the Intel Core Ultra Series 1 architecture (codenamed "Meteor Lake"), a bump in connectivity to Wi-Fi 7 and Bluetooth 5.4, and a bump in webcam resolution from 720p to 1080p. Display options included FHD+ (1920x1200) 120Hz 100% DCI-P3 500-nit non-touch IPS, QHD+ (2560x1600) 120Hz 100% DCI-P3 500-nit touch-enabled IPS, or 2.8K+ (2880x1800) 60Hz 100% sRGB 400-nit touch-enabled OLED. Specific processor options were the Intel Core Ultra 5 125H, Ultra 7 155H, or Ultra 165H, each accompanied by an Intel Arc iGPU.

=== XPS 13 9345 (2024) ===
Model 9345 was a variation of the 9340, featuring the ARM-based Qualcomm Snapdragon processor (Snapdragon X Elite X1E-80-100, or Snapdragon X Plus X1P-64-100); Qualcomm Adreno integrated graphics; and Qualcomm Wi-fi and Bluetooth; all in place of the usual Intel chipsets. It also included a Qualcomm Hexagon NPU, which at 40 TOPS made it capable of utilising localized Copilot+ AI. Use of Qualcomm chips meant no Thunderbolt 4 support.

=== XPS 13 9350 (2024) ===
Model 9350 was a variant of the 9340, primarily just offering a bump in spec to the Intel Core Ultra Series 2 architecture.

(Not to be confused with the model 9350 from 2015).

=== XPS 13 DX13260 (2026) ===
Model DX13260 launched in mid-2026. Following on the heels of the 14" DA14260 and 16" DA16260 it was part of the relaunch of the XPS brand, briefly terminated in 2025. Like the larger models it incorporated a further refreshed design, though with significant differences to its larger cousins. Like the larger models it saw the XPS logo replace the traditional Dell logo on the lid; the return of proper function keys, ditching the controversial capacitive keys of the previous few models; and the power button remaining a key in the top-right of the keyboard, though now with a power symbol rather than being blank. However, the keyboard reverted to the traditional chiclet style, and touchpad to the non-seamless and non-haptic kind, both last seen in model 9315.

Expansion remained limited to just two USB-C ports (3.2 Gen 2; supporting DisplayPort and Power Delivery, but not Thunderbolt), with no audio jack or card reader, as with the previous few models. Customisation options were very limited. All lower-end units came with an Intel Core 5 Series 3 (Wildcat Lake) 320 processor; integrated Intel graphics; a choice of only 8 or 16GiB of LPDDR5x RAM; a 512GiB M.2 PCIe NVMe SSD (replaceable but only M.2 size 2230 supported); a 13.4" 2.5K (2560x1600) 30-120Hz 500-nit variable refresh-rate touchscreen; Wi-Fi 7 and Bluetooth 6, soldered to the motherboard; a 1080p webcam; a 3-cell 52Whr battery; and a choice between Sky or Storm colors. Weight was as little as 1 kg (2.2 lb). Higher-end units came with Panther Lake and the addition of Thunderbolt 4.

Lower-end units received generally positive reviews for the value they offered over competitors at its sub-$1000 price point, such as the MacBook Neo. However, the CPU & iGPU performance of both the XPS 13 and MacBook Neo were criticized as being only suitable for very basic computer tasks. Inclusion of this model under the XPS banner was thus questioned by some outlets since the XPS branding traditionally denotes "premium tier". Higher-end units with Panther Lake were criticized for not offering a better screen than the base units, expansion options being considered inadequate, and their higher price putting them in a more premium tier behind competitors such as the MacBook Air, Lenovo Yoga Slim 7i Ultra, or HP OmniBook Ultra.

== XPS 14 series ==
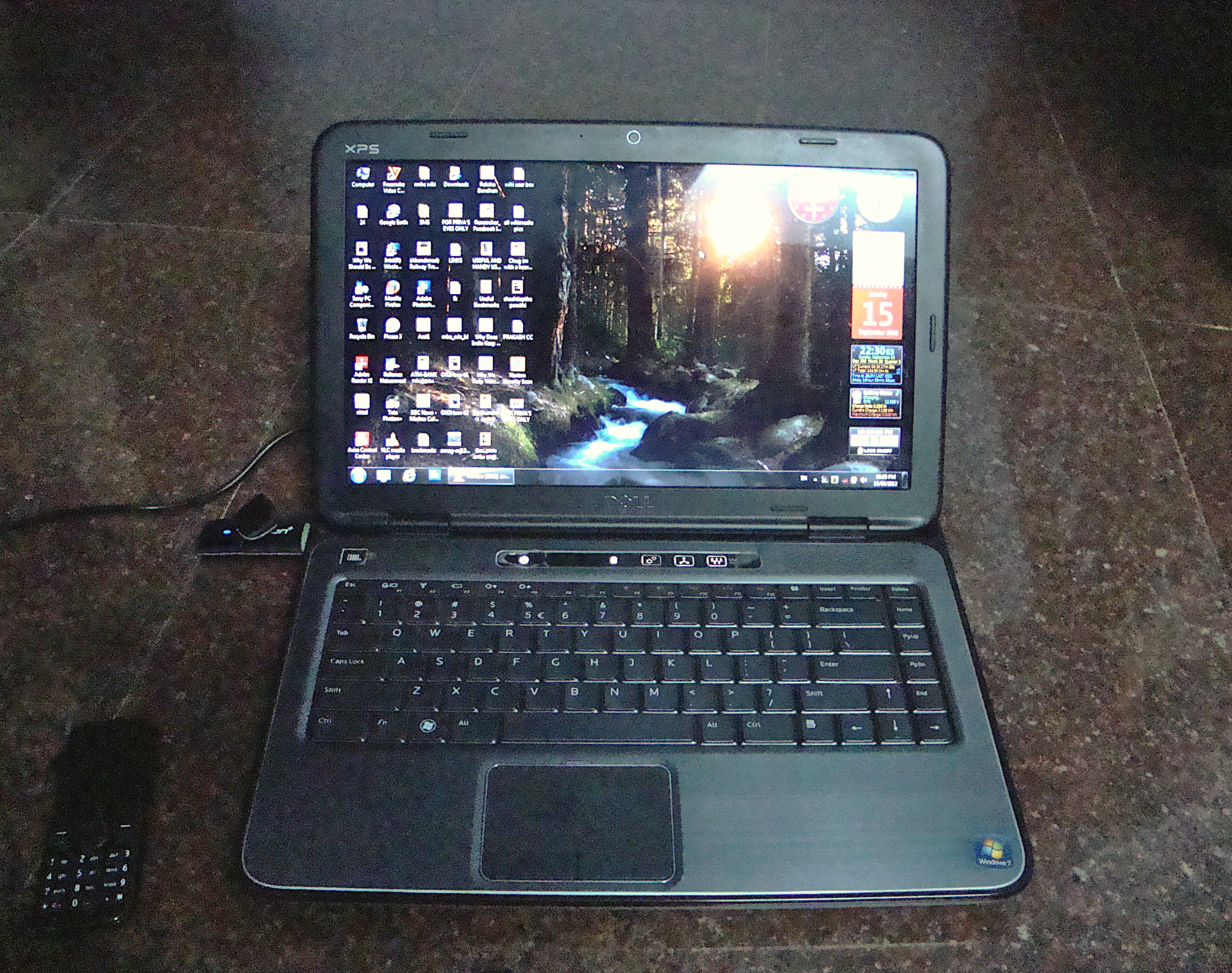
Dell XPS L401X

=== XPS 14 L401X (2010) ===
Model L401X was released in October 2010. It had a 14-inch HD WLED screen with a resolution of up to 1366x768 (touch screen iCESs optional), and bundled an Intel Core i3-360M processor (2.4 GHz; 2Core/4Threads; 3M cache), and 4 GB 1333 MHz DDR3 SDRAM. Its base price at release was US$999 and it came with the i3-360M by default. It could be customized up to the Intel core i7 740Qm. It was equipped with a 2011 4GB NVIDIA GeForce GT 420M Graphics (for Core-i5 processors), or GT 425M (for Core-i7 processors). It could also be customized with up to 8 GB of DDR3 RAM. It could either have a 500 GB 7200 RPM SATA hard drive, or a 256 GB SSD. It had a sleek anodized aluminum LCD back cover; the World's first camera with Hi-Definition Video Streaming with Skype (2.0MP, H.264 Camera); JBL 2.0 Speakers with Waves MaxxAudio v3.0 enhancement for a 6-Way audio performance; and a Biometric (fast-access) facial recognition system.

=== XPS 14z L412z (2011) ===
Released in late 2011, the model L412z was a 14-inch 'thin-and-light' built around Intel's Sandy Bridge platform. It was typically configured with a Core i5/i7 dual-core CPU (e.g. i7-2640M), and optional NVIDIA GeForce GT 520M graphics alongside Intel HD 3000. It used a 1366x768 WLED panel, kept a slot-loading DVD drive, and concentrated most ports at the rear, featuring: HDMI; mini-DisplayPort; RJ-45; one USB 3.0; one USB 2.0; a 7-in-1 card reader (SD, SDHC, SDXC, MMC, Memory Stick (MS), Memory Stick PRO (MS-PRO), and xD-Picture Card.); and headset jack. Dell's official docs list the system with a HM67 chipset and single 2.5″ SATA bay, while period reviews highlighted 8 GB RAM options and the common i7-2640M/GT 520M pairing.

=== XPS 14 L421X (2012) ===
Model L421X was released in the summer of 2012. Its base price at release was US$999. It could be customized up to the third generation Intel Core i7. It was equipped with a 2012 NVIDIA GT 630M on higher models, or Intel HD graphics 4000 on the base model. It could be customized with up to 8 GiB of DDR3 RAM. It could either have a 500 GB 7200 RPM SATA hard drive, or a 256 GB SSD. It was categorized as an Ultrabook, and featured a long battery life (claimed to be 9 hours), and a sleek aluminum unibody shell.

=== XPS 14 9440 (2024) ===
Model 9440 was released in early 2024, reviving the 14" line. Alongside the 13" 9340 and 16" 9640, it capitalised on the "experimental" redesign of the XPS 13 'Plus' 9320 from 2022. One notable design difference compared to the 13" 9340 was that, owing to the laptop's greater width, the new keyboard design did not span the full width, with space instead for upward-facing speakers on either side.

It offered two 14.5" display options, either a 1920x1200 500-nit 100% sRGB LCD IPS, or a 3200x2000 400-nit 100% DCI-P3 OLED touchscreen, both with a refresh rate of 120Hz. It used an Intel Core Ultra Series 1 processor, and came with either integrated Intel Arc graphics, or an optional NVIDIA GeForce RTX 4050 discreet GPU. It provided three USB-C ports (with thunderbolt 4, DisplayPort, and Power Delivery support), as opposed to just two on the 13" 9340, and a 1080p webcam. Unlike the 13" 9340 it provided a headset jack (headphone and microphone combo), along with a microSDXC card reader. Connectivity included Wi-Fi 6E and Bluetooth 5.3. The battery was a 6-cell 70Whr.

=== XPS 14, aka Dell 14 Premium, DA14250 (2025) ===
Model DA14250 was initially launched in 2025 as the 'Dell 14 Premium' under the revised Dell lineup of 2025 that had seen the temporary demise of the XPS branding. Since the return of XPS in 2026 this model can be found re-labelled on the Dell website as an 'XPS 14'. The spec in this model was bumped to the Intel Core Ultra Series 2 architecture, along with Wi-Fi 7 and Bluetooth 5.4. The Graphite color option of the 9440 was replaced with Storm. Two display options were available, either a 2K 30-120Hz 500-nit IPS LCD, or a 3.2K 48-120Hz 400-nit OLED touchscreen, with both having a variable refresh rate.

=== XPS 14 DA14260 (2026) ===
Model DA14260, launched in early 2026, was part of the relaunch of the XPS brand, briefly terminated in 2025. It incorporated a further refreshed design, marketed as the thinnest to date, with the XPS logo replacing the traditional Dell logo on the lid; the return of proper function keys, ditching the controversial capacitive keys of the previous two models; and was exclusively available in the Storm color. The seamless haptic touchpad was retained, though the edges were now etch-marked into the palmrest. The keyboard remained a latticeless design. The power button remained a key in the top-right of the keyboard, but now had a power symbol rather than being blank. The visible speaker grills either side of the keyboard were removed.

It came with three USB-C ports, each supporting thunderbolt 4, DisplayPort 2.1, and Power Delivery; an audio jack; and sported an 8MP 4K HDR webcam. Wifi-7 and Bluetooth 6 connectivity was provided, though soldered to the motherboard. It was powered by an Intel Core Ultra Series 3 (Panther Lake) processor. The base model sported an Intel Core Ultra 5 325; 16GiB of LPDDR5X RAM; a 512GiB M.2 PCIe NVMe SSD; and a 2K (1920x1200) 1-120Hz 500-nit IPS display. Processor upgrades available included the Ultra 7 355, Ultra X7 358H, and Ultra X9 388H. Other upgrades available included 32 and 64GiB memory options; 1, 2 and 4TiB storage options; and a 2.8K (2880x1800) 20-120Hz 400-nit tandem-OLED touchscreen. Both displays had variable refresh rates. Weight was as little as 1.36Kg. Only integrated Intel graphics was available, though with the X7 and X9 processor options this was bumped up to Intel Arc graphics. The battery was 70Whr, using three 'high energy density' 900ED cells. Combined with the variable refresh displays, this was expected to offer great battery life.

== XPS 15 series ==
=== XPS 15 L501X (2010) ===
The XPS 15 was released in October 2010 as a 15.6-inch laptop. Its base price at release was $849 and it could be customized up to the Intel Core i7. It was equipped with a 2010 NVIDIA GT 435M or 420M video card, and could be customized with up to 8 GiB of DDR3 RAM. This made it a good gaming laptop for its time. The base model came with a 500 GB 7200 rpm SATA hard drive, but alternative options included a 640 GB 7200 RPM SATA hard drive or a 256 GiB SSD. It also contained a 16x DVD/Blu-ray reader/burner, and a 9-in-1 media card reader. The screen resolution was either 1366x768 or 1920x1080. The NVIDIA graphics card turned on automatically for specific applications demanding dedicated graphics. It had integrated JBL 2.1 Speakers + Waves MaxxAudio enhancement. It was equipped with a 2MP webcam, had two USB 3.0 ports, and one eSATAp port.

=== XPS 15 L502X (2011) ===
In the year following the release of the L501X, model L502X was released, upgrading the processor and graphics card. The processor was upgraded from the Arrandale to the Sandy Bridge chipset, and the graphics were upgraded to either an NVIDIA 525M or 540M with 1 or 2 GiB of RAM respectively.

=== XPS 15z L511Z (2011) ===
Model L511Z was released in May 2011. It was branded as the thinnest 15 inch PC on the market. It was noted for having a very similar design to the 2011 Apple MacBook Pro, and even sported a silver aluminum casing. Its base price at release was US$999 (A$1399) and it could be customized up to the dual-core Intel Core i7. It was equipped with an NVIDIA GeForce GT 525M 1 GiB video card (Australian version with 2 GiB of video RAM), and could be customized with up to 8 GiB of DDR3 RAM. It could have either a 750 GB 7200 RPM hard drive, or a 256 GB SSD. It also contained an 8x slot-loading CD/DVD reader/burner. The American version had a base screen resolution of 1366x768, while the Australian release was 1920x1080.

On 6 September, 2011, Dell upgraded the choices for the optional extra Core i5 and i7 processors.

Throughout its production, the XPS 15z was plagued with DPC latency-related sound spikes due to faulty network drivers provided by Dell. The solution was to use third-party drivers, as discovered by a community of forum users. Another chronic issue was the lower right corner of the LCD going dim at random times. Replacement of the entire LCD assembly would only temporarily solve this problem. Production ceased in the first half of 2012, but its design was carried on by the XPS 14z. It was marketed as a stylish laptop built with "premium materials" with aluminum and magnesium alloy frame.

=== XPS 15 L521X (2012) ===
Model L521X was released in Summer 2012. It included a FHD WLED 1920x1080 screen, featuring Corning Gorilla and TrueLife, and was much thinner than its predecessor. Its design was similar to Dell XPS 13 L321X and Dell XPS 14 L421X, with rounded edges, and the bottom being made of carbon fiber, with a gentle silicone surface treatment. It featured an Intel HM77 Express Chipset with an Intel Core i5/i7 CPU (3rd generation, up to i7-3632QM); from 4 to 16 GiB of replaceable DDR3 RAM (2 slots); GeForce GT630M / GT640M with 1 or 2 GiB of GDDR5; and one mSATA mini card slot paired with a classic 2.5 inch SATA slot.

=== XPS 15 9530 (2013) ===
Model 9530 was released in October 2013. It retained many design elements of the L521X, but improved cooling/throttling, and upgraded to the Haswell microarchitecture and updated GeForce GT 750M. It included no optical drive, and had a relatively high-resolution 3200x1800 display. It shipped with Windows 8.1. Three standard variants were provided. The base variant came with a 1920x1080 touchscreen display (unclear whether this was a TN panel); a 500 GB HDD with 32 GiB mSATA SSD cache; a dual-core i5-4200H CPU; HM 87 chipset; 8 GiB of DDR3 RAM; integrated HD 4400 Graphics; and a 61Wh battery. The mid-range variant upgraded this to a quad-core i7-4702HQ CPU; 3200x1800 PPS (similar to IPS) touchscreen; 16 GiB of DDR3 RAM; a GT 750M GDDR5 GPU; and a 1 TB HDD with 32 GiB SSD cache. The high-end variant upgraded this further with a 512 GB mSATA SSD, and a larger 91 Wh battery in place of the 2.5" drive. There was also a higher resolution 4k 3840x2160, and a slightly better CPU - i7-4712HQ. The Audio system was a Realtek HD with stereo speakers.

The 9530 has been criticized for the instability of 802.11ac Wi-Fi. This model has a common issue with coil whine.

(Not to be confused with model 9530 from 2023).

=== XPS 15 9550 (2015) ===
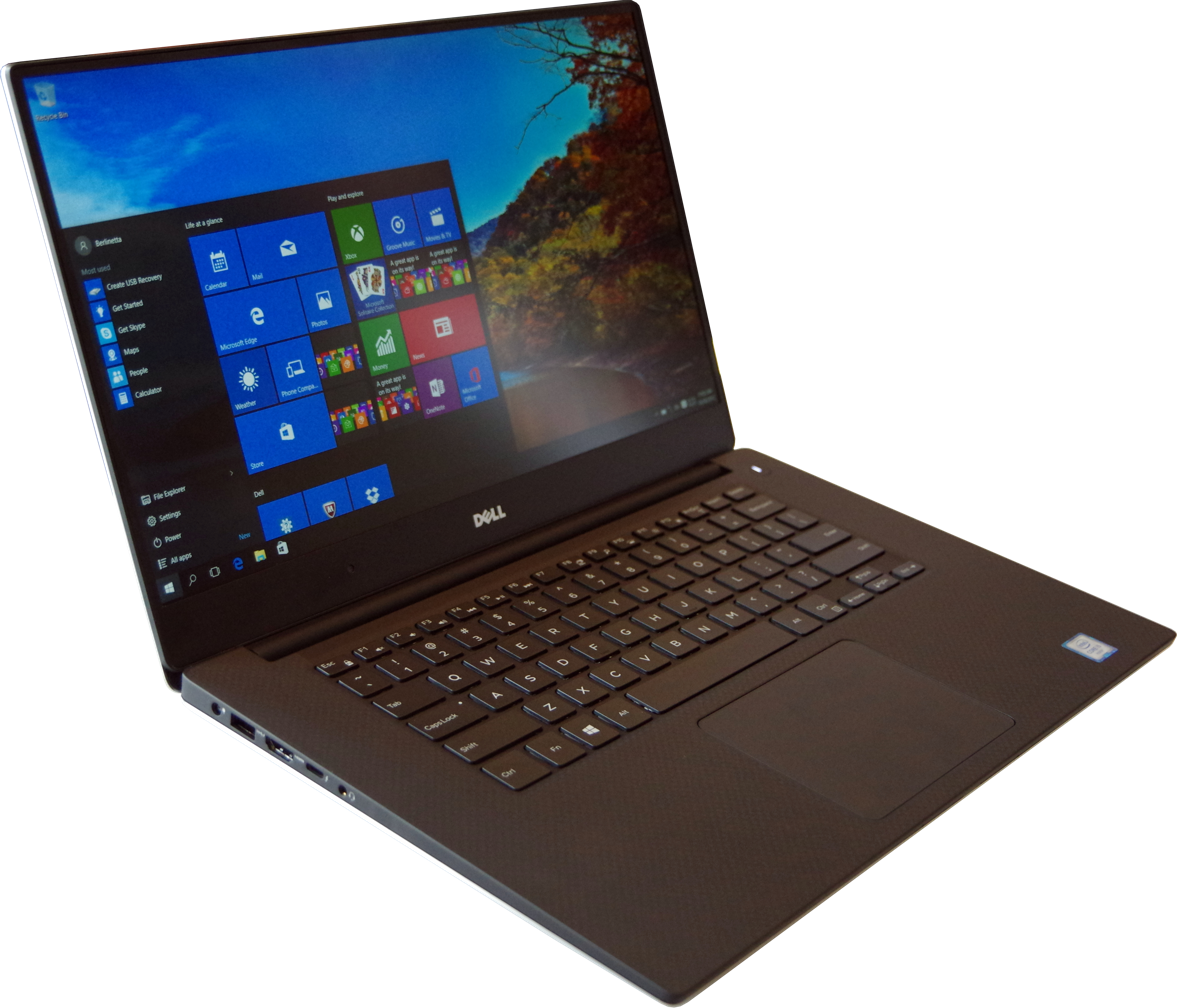
Dell XPS 15 9550

Model 9550 was released on October 8, 2015, upgrading to the Skylake microarchitecture. The 15.6-inch UltraSharp™ InfinityEdge display was included that responded well to standard Windows 8.1 swipes and commands. Edge-to-edge Gorilla Glass NBT covered the screen. The chiclet keys of the backlight keyboard were matte black and featured a slightly concave surface area. This redesigned model offered PCIe SSDs up to 1 TB; up to 32 GiB of DDR4 RAM through two SODIMM slots; a GeForce GTX 960M with 2 GiB GDDR5; a 3×3 802.11ac Wi-Fi card; and featured Thunderbolt 3 through Type-C, though this port is only able to achieve Thunderbolt 2 speeds. 2 different battery sizes were offered: either a 56wh battery with space for a sata drive, or a larger 84wh that took up the sata slot. The audio system used Realtek ALC3266 with stereo speakers.

=== XPS 15 9560 (2017) ===
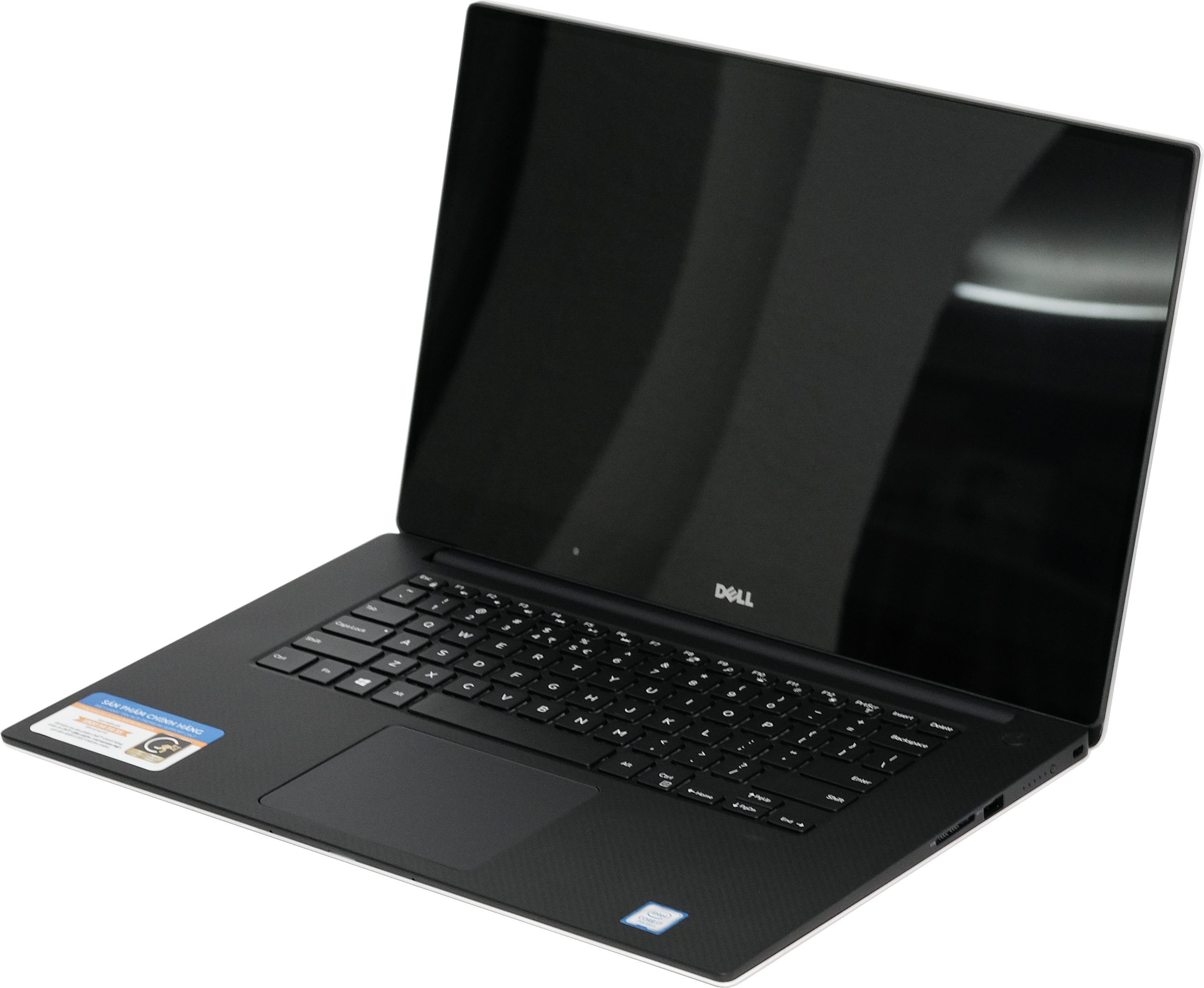
Dell XPS 15 9560

A slightly updated model 9560 was released in February 2017. The new model aligned with the previous model 9550 in terms of dimension and exterior ports, but inside the CPU and GPU were upgraded to Kaby Lake and GTX 1050, respectively. The capacity of the larger battery was increased to 97wh and an option for a fingerprint scanner integrated into the right side of the palmrest was added. It also featured an optional 4K glossy touchscreen with 100% AdobeRGB 1998 color coverage; up to 64GB of DDR4 RAM; and the same aluminum chassis with carbon-fiber palmrests. This model suffered from many throttling issues at high workloads - primarily due to inadequate cooling of the VRMs, causing it to throttle power and limit the CPU to only 800mHz until temperatures dropped. Users could mitigate this by using laptop cooling pads along with undervolting, or using 3rd party tools such as Throttlestop to bypass CPU and power throttling limitations entirely.

=== XPS 15 '2-in-1' 9575 (2018) ===
Model 9575, announced at CES 2018, was similar to the 9560 but with a flexible hinge allowing it to fold over into tablet mode. It featured the 8th Generation Intel mobile processors, with AMD GPUs integrated into the chip package. It utilized LPDDR3 RAM, which was soldered in and thus not upgradable.

=== XPS 15 9570 (2018) ===
Model 9570 is the updated version of the 9560 from May 2018. It brought options for the new Coffee Lake processors, with the option for the six-core Core i9-8950HK being clocked at 2.9 GHz, with a boost clock of 4.8 GHz and the ability to be overclocked as well. It also came with an option for the NVIDIA GeForce GTX 1050Ti graphics card, and had an optional fingerprint scanner integrated into the power button. The webcam placement had also been shifted to be underneath the DELL logo on the bottom of the display. The non-touch Full HD variant offered 100% sRGB colour space coverage on its IPS display. Its Thunderbolt 3 port supported all four PCIe lanes, unlike the previous models which only had support for two lanes. Audio support used the Realtek ALC3266-CG.

=== XPS 15 7590 (2019) ===
Model 7590, launched 27 June, 2019, was released with an OLED non-touch display option (the Samsung 4K Ultra HD (3840x2160)). It featured 9th Gen Intel Core processors (up to Core i9-9980HK); Wi-Fi 6; and an optional NVIDIA GeForce GTX 1650 GPU. It supported up to 64 GiB of memory with a bandwidth of 2666 MHz, and a 2 TB PCIe SSD. The webcam was shifted to the top of the display.

=== XPS 15 9500 (2020) ===
The biggest changes in model 9500, from May 2020, were going all-in on USB-C and a 16:10 display aspect ratio. It also had a smaller and higher resolution (720p) webcam, and more powerful speakers that point upwards. The CPU was upgraded to 10th Gen Intel Comet Lake; the RAM up to 64 GiB DDR4; storage up to 2 TB PCIe3 x4 SSD; graphics to Intel Ultra-HD Graphics + NVIDIA GTX 1650 Ti; and audio to the Realtek ALC3281-CG with quad speakers (2 tweeters and 2 woofers). Choice of Infinity Edge display was given between resolutions of 1920x1200 or 3840x2400, and choice of battery was between 56 Wh or 86 Wh. Its size was 13.57x9x0.7 inches. Weight was either 4 pounds (for non-touch; 56Whr battery), or 4.5 pounds (touch; 86Whr battery). It was both thinner and lighter than the previous model.

=== XPS 15 9510 (2021) ===
Model 9510, from May 2021, came equipped with up to Intel's 11th Gen Tiger Lake Core i9-11900H, and NVIDIA GeForce RTX 3050 Ti. It featured up to 64 GB of DDR4-3200, and up to 4 TB of m.2 SSD storage, but could be upgraded to hold a maximum of two 4 TB SSDs. It offered display options of either a touch-enabled 4K Ultra-HD+ (3840x2400) InfinityEdge with a VESA DisplayHDR400 certification; a touch-enabled 3.5K (3456 x 2160) InfinityEdge OLED; or a FHD (1920 x 1200) panel. Ports were also upgrade, offering two Thunderbolt 4 ports, and a regular USB 3.2 Gen 2 Type-C port.

=== XPS 15 9520 (2022) ===
Model 9520 updated the CPU with Intel 12th generation Alder Lake chips, including the Core i5-12500H, Core i7-12700H, and Core i9-12900 HK. RAM was upgraded from DDR4-3200 to DDR5-4800. The audio chip was upgraded to the Realtek ALC3281. GPU and storage options weren't changed, so users could still configure with PCIe4 x4 SSDs or up to GeForce RTX 3050 Ti graphics if desired.

=== XPS 15 9530 (2023) ===
Model 9530, from March 2023, updated to Intel 13th generation Raptor Lake chips, including the Core i5-13500H, Core i7-13700H, and Core i9-13900H. The GPU was upgraded to either the Intel Arc A370M, or the NVIDIA GeForce RTX 4050, 4060, or 4070. Also, a new 90 Wh battery option was introduced.

(Not to be confused with model 9530 from 2013).

== XPS 16 series ==
=== XPS 16 9640 (2024) ===
The 16" model 9640 was released in early 2024, in tandem with the return of the 14" line with the model 9440. (They would appear to have each supplanted the 17" and 15" lines respectively). Alongside the 13" 9340 and 14" 9440, model 9640 capitalised on the "experimental" redesign of the XPS 13 'Plus' 9320 from 2022. As with the 14" 9440, one notable design difference compared to the 13" 9340 was that, owing to the laptop's greater width, the new keyboard design did not span the full width, with space instead for upward-facing speakers on either side.

It offered two 16.3" display options, either a FHD+ (1920x1200) 30-120Hz 500-nit 100% sRGB LCD IPS, or a 4K+ (3840x2400) 48-90Hz 400-nit 100% DCI-P3 OLED touchscreen, both with variable refresh rate. It used an Intel Core Ultra Series 1 processor; came with either integrated Intel Arc graphics, or an optional NVIDIA GeForce RTX 4050, 4060, or 4070 discreet GPU; had either 16, 32 or 64GiB of LPDDR5X RAM; and either 512MiB, 1TiB, 2TiB, or 4TiB of M.2 PCIe NVMe SSD based storage. Color options were a choice between Platinum and Graphite. It provided three USB-4 USB-C ports (with thunderbolt 4, DisplayPort, and Power Delivery support), as opposed to just two on the 13", though with the NVIDIA GeForce RTX 4070 option one of them dropped down to USB 3.2 without Thunderbolt support. As with the 14" 9440 it provided a headset jack (headphone and microphone combo), along with a microSDXC card reader, and 1080p webcam. Connectivity included Wi-Fi 7 and Bluetooth 5.4. The battery was a 6-cell 99.5Whr. As of November 2024, it started at a price of $1,699 USD

=== XPS 16, aka Dell 16 Premium, DA16250 (2025) ===
Similar to the 14" DA14250, model DA16250 was initially launched in 2025 as the 'Dell 16 Premium' under the revised Dell lineup of 2025 that had seen the temporary demise of the XPS branding. Since the return of XPS in 2026 this model can be found re-labelled on the Dell website as an 'XPS 16'. The spec in this model was bumped to the Intel Core Ultra Series 2 architecture; the discreet Nvidia GeForce RTX GPU options were bumped to the 5050, 5060, and 5070 models; and connectivity was bumped to Wi-Fi 7 and Bluetooth 5.4. Unlike the 14" DA14250 the Graphite color option was not replaced with Storm. Two display options were available, either a 2K 30-120Hz 500-nit IPS LCD, or a 3.2K 48-120Hz 400-nit OLED touchscreen, with both having a variable refresh rate.

=== XPS 16 DA16260 (2026) ===
Model DA16260, like the DA14260, launched in early 2026, being part of the relaunch of the XPS brand, briefly terminated in 2025. It used the same refreshed design as the 14" DA14260, and provided almost identical features, base specification, and upgrade options. Differences only included the touchscreen option being 3.2K (3200x2000) resolution rather than 2.8K, and the camera, while still being 8MP and supporting HDR, only being 1080p instead of 4K, according to dell website specifications. Weight was as little as 1.65Kg with the OLED display, or 1.74Kg with the IPS.

== XPS 17 series ==
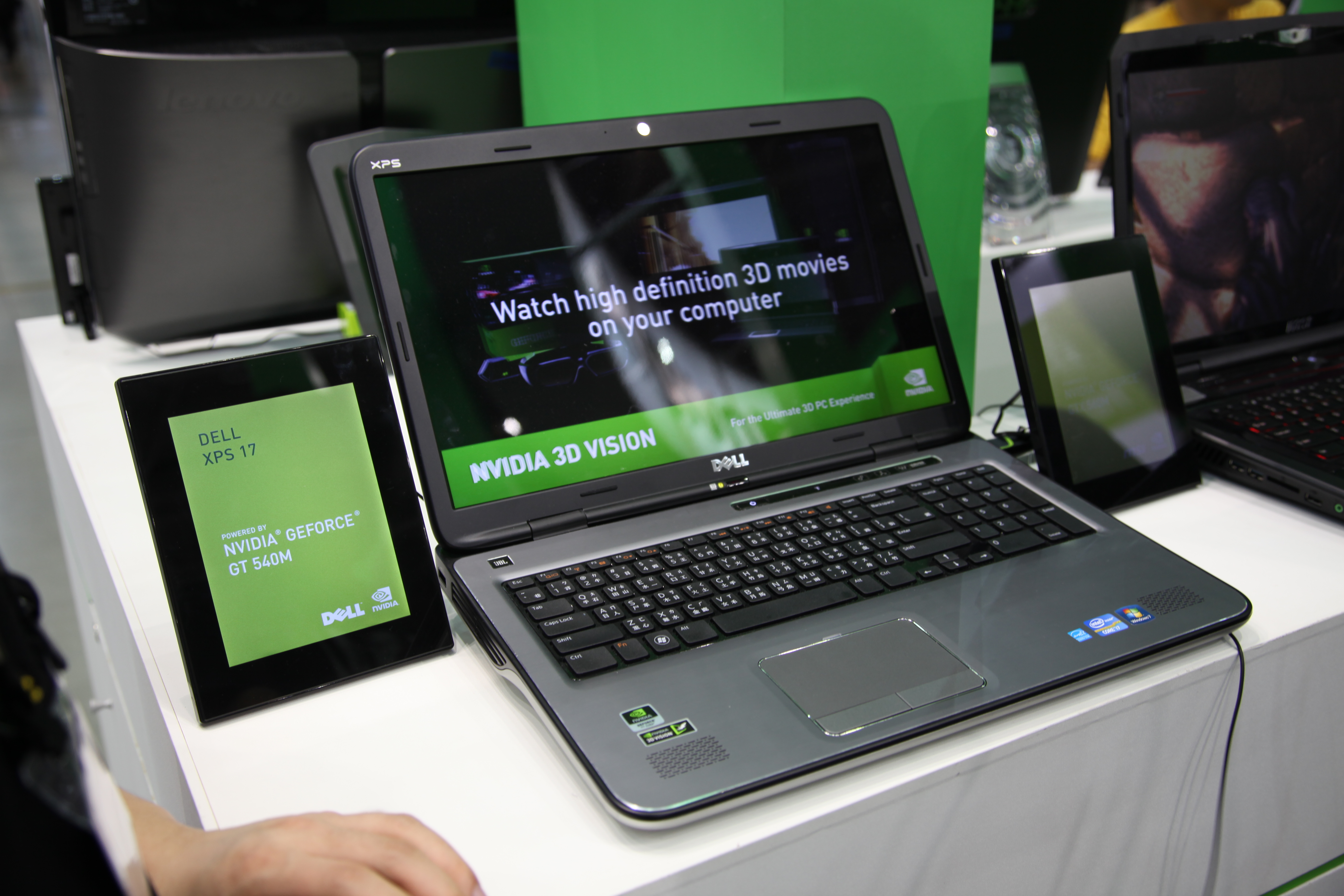
XPS 17

=== XPS 17 L701X (2010) ===
The Dell XPS 17, released in October 2010, was intended as a desktop replacement in the XPS laptop line. It was priced at $949 for the base configuration, but could be customized heavily. Options included a processor upgrade up to the Intel Core i7-840QM (Nehalem microarchitecture); an NVIDIA GeForce GT 555 3 GiB graphics card; up to 16 GiB of DDR3 RAM; a 1.28 TB Hard Drive (2x 0.64 TB at 7200 RPM); a 17.3-inch 1600x900 resolution screen; and a Blu-ray Disc drive. Optional was an LCD upgrade to 1920x1080 (Full HD) and 3D display kit.

=== XPS 17 L702X (2011) ===
Model L702X was quite similar to the L701X, but contained second-generation Intel Core i5 and i7 (Sandy Bridge) processors, and capability for an FHD, and FHD 3D displays. Additionally the discrete graphics had been improved to NVIDIA GeForce GT 550M 1 GiB, or GT 555M 3 GiB for Full HD 3D. It could also be customized with up to 16 GiB of DDR3 RAM (2x 8 GiB), or 32 GiB (four slots at 8 GiB) with the 3D variant. Issues were reported with the charging port and the charger falling out with only slight movements.

=== XPS 17 9700 (2020) ===
After almost a decade since the last model, Dell reintroduced the XPS 17 with model 9700 on On May 14, 2020. This model came with thinner bezels that housed a 16:10 display, with a choice between a matt FHD+ panel, or a glossy UHD+ touchscreen. The speakers were updated to have 2 tweeters and 2 woofers; the battery choices were now between a 56 wh and a 97 wh; and biometric login options were added with a Windows Hello webcam and a fingerprint reader. The new thermal design now featured a vapor chamber. It offered up to Intel's 10th Generation Core i9 45 W processors; Nvidia GeForce RTX 2060 Max-Q GPU; 64 GiB of RAM; and 2 TB of storage.

=== XPS 17 9710 (2021) ===
Model 9710, released in May 2021, introduced an update to Intel's 11th gen Core i5, i7, and i9 processors, and Nvidia GeFore RTX 3050 and 3060 GPUs.

=== XPS 17 9720 (2022) ===
Model 9720, released in April 2022, introduced an update to Intel's 12th gen Core i5, i7, and i9 processors.

=== XPS 17 9730 (2023) ===
Model 9730, released in February 2023, introduced an update to Intel's 13th gen Core i5, i7, and i9 processors, and Nvidia GeForce RTX 4050, 4060, 4070 and 4080 GPUs.

== Awards ==
The Dell XPS 13 and 15 laptops won the COMPUTEX d&i awards in 2016

Dell XPS 15 (9500): Best in Class, Rated 5/5

"The Dell XPS 15 is easily the best 15-inch laptop on the market, and in a lot of ways it's the best laptop period." — TechRadar

Dell XPS 17 (9700): Editor's Choice, Rated 4.5/5

"If you were waiting for a bigger screen with this design, you're finally getting one (and getting the performance to match)." — Tom's Hardware

Dell XPS 15 7590: The best laptops for 2020

"The XPS 15 is easily the best all-around 15-inch laptop on the market today, making it the ultimate video-editing laptop too." — Digital Trends
