= Alpha Prime =

2007 video game

- Developer(s): Black Element Software
- Publisher(s): RUS: 1C Company; EU: IDEA Games; NA: Meridian4; Bohemia Interactive
- Composer(s): Kasny Jaroslav
- Engine: Enforce 2
- Platform(s): Microsoft Windows; Cloud (OnLive)
- Release: RUS: December 21, 2006; NA: May 1, 2007 (Online); EU: May 25, 2007; NA: November 7, 2007 (Steam)
- Genre(s): First-person shooter
- Mode(s): Single-player

Alpha Prime is a first-person shooter video game developed by Black Element Software and released in 2006–2007. The script for the game's story was written by Ondřej Neff, and the game is built upon Black Element's proprietary Enforce 2 Engine. Alpha Prime was initially released on Steam and, as of August 30, 2011, it also became available on the cloud gaming service OnLive.

== Plot ==
The State Business Federation has discovered an asteroid dubbed Alpha Prime with rich deposits of hubbardium, which is used as fuel in interstellar ships. During the mining operations, the miners began to go mad due to exposure to hubbardium. The State Business Federation decided that mining the hubbardium was too dangerous, and sealed off the asteroid.

The protagonist, Arnold Weiss, is recruited by an old friend, Livia, to rescue their mutual friend, Warren Reynolds, who was trapped on the asteroid when it was sealed off. Arnold grudgingly accepts, and they head off in a ship called the Artemis. The ship is disabled by a mine before they reach the asteroid, however, and only Arnold and Livia survive. Arnold gets into an escape pod and lands on Alpha Prime alone.

After fighting his way through malfunctioning robots and miners driven mad by hubbardium exposure, Arnold meets up with an Italian member of the Association of Freelance Prospector's named Paolo Bellini. Paolo gives Arnold a device known as a ReCon, used to hack into a variety of electronics, and agrees to help him. Paolo then suggests they go further into the complex to escape the insane miners. After another run in with robots, Paolo is injured and decides to stay behind when Arnold goes to survey the area. The two notice that the area is now crawling with enforcers from the company that originally controlled the mining operation.

Arnold gets in contact with another employee trapped on Alpha Prime, Bruce Lawrence, who assists him in opening some doors. On the way back, the leader of the enforcers, Colonel Olivier, finds Paolo and asks him about Glomar, an urban legend said to be the source of hubbardium. Paolo attempts to escape, but is killed. Livia contacts Arnold again to explain that she has been hiding from Colonel Olivier's ship, but Bruce later informs him that Livia had been transmitting directly to Olivier.

Using the complex's tram system, Arnold finally makes his way to Warren. Warren reveals that Livia was on Alpha Prime when the Company first tried to acquire the heart of Glomar, now confirmed to be the source of the radiation which transforms rock into hubbardium. Something went wrong and during the company's flight, Livia abandoned Warren to go with them. Warren removes the information about how to find Glomar's heart, which constantly moves, from Alpha Prime's database, and attempts to hide it.

Olivier's men fake an image of Paolo approaching the room on the security cameras, leading Warren to go outside to get him. Arnold realizes it's a trap, but gets over to Warren too late, who is captured. Arnold chases Olivier and Warren to Olivier's ship, which he also hopes to use to escape the asteroid after rescuing Warren. Warren, however, inspired by an act of Paolo's, sets off an explosion as a distraction to escape, also resulting in the ship being rendered unusable.

Arnold gets a tip that Warren might be headed to an old mining site, and drives a buggy across the asteroid's surface to reach it. Arnold meets up with Bruce there, only to find out that Olivier already caught Warren, stole the database containing the location of Glomar's heart, and left him for dead. With his dying breath, Warren informs Arnold that when you touch the heart, it does whatever you expect it to. Arnold insists he's going after Olivier, so Bruce leaves because he only wants to escape the asteroid.

Arnold tracks Olivier to an old mine and begins descending into it. Along the way, Olivier, who now wants the heart for himself, contacts Arnold and insists that they both have the same goal: keeping the heart away from the company. He also warns Arnold of a spy by the codename of Coral Snake, who is a mutual acquaintance he insists cannot be trusted. Arnold speculates that the Coral Snake may not even exist at all, and is only a myth to turn Arnold against his friends.

Arnold finally reaches Olivier, who is about to pick up Glomar's heart. He threatens to kill him, but Olivier insists that Arnold would not shoot next to such a precious object. Instead, Arnold convinces Olivier that Glomar will destroy Olivier if he picks it up. With the doubt in his mind, Warren's prediction turns out true as Olivier is transformed into a hideous abomination upon touching the heart. Arnold defeats the corrupted Olivier and goes to pick up the heart himself.

Bruce contacts Arnold, only to be cut off by the sounds of a struggle. Livia, who had landed the Artemis, arrives and tries to stop Arnold from picking up the heart. Arnold does anyway, however, and asks Livia if she can guess his wish. Livia approaches him and shoots him dead, revealing that she was Coral Snake.

The game ends with a shot of Arnold's corpse as Livia insists to Company members that Arnold has the heart, and she needs to get it out of his body. She requests an autopsy and Arnold's head turns, revealing green glowing eyes as the screen fades to black.

== Gameplay ==
The game has a total of 10 missions or levels, and around 14 types of enemies. The game's mechanics allow for an interactive environment, a hacking system, and a "bullet time" system. It primarily features traditional first-person shooter gameplay interspersed with basic puzzle solving involving the hacking system or locating objects.

== Soundtrack ==
Composed by Jaroslav Kašný, the soundtrack of Alpha Prime consists of sixteen Industrial tracks and has been released for free on the website.

== Development ==
The original preview of the game was released during E3 2006. There it was revealed that the game would have support for the Ageia's PhysX processor. The company that created the game, Black Element Software, is based in the Czech Republic. A system was created for the game, originally known as the "Remote Hacking Device", but eventually renamed to the "Remote Control (ReCon)", which allows the player to manipulate electronic devices in the environment. The developers decided during the game's development phase that the user would have no choice in the name, look, or appearance of the playable character, since the game was not an RPG, and that the game would incorporate player-controlled vehicles and preset weapons. An important focus during development was the realism and facial expressions of the non-playable characters (NPCs), and it was the developers' choice to make the overall game primarily linear to appeal to a general audience. The developers also used specific languages to make the Artificial Intelligence language as adaptable as possible. The game is powered by the Enforce 2 Engine with Meqon Physics.

On July 7, 2009, a patch was released to address some of the concerns of players. On top of adding full-screen antialiasing, it fixed issues with sound in Windows Vista, as well as tweaking the difficulty. Enemies are now slightly weaker, are damaged more easily, and give out more ammo when you need it.

== Reception ==
Reception

Aggregate score
Aggregator	Score
Metacritic	59/100

Review scores
Publication	Score
4Players	62%
Eurogamer	3/10
GameRevolution	C
GameStar	64%
GameZone	6.9/10
Jeuxvideo.com	9/20
PC Format	69%
PC Gamer (UK)	60%
PC Gamer (US)	40%
PC Zone	58%

The game received "mixed" reviews according to the review aggregation website Metacritic. The enemies were criticized for being too hard, with perfect aim at all ranges and no reduction in damage, leading players to constantly having to save and load. The voice acting was seen as sub-par, as well as some sound effects lacking "punch". Moreover, the dubbing of Paolo Bellini (a character of Italian origins) received hilarious reactions from Italian YouTubers because of its stereotypical depiction of English-Italian accent, mixed with some common slang expressions. The lack of multiplayer was also a notable criticism. On the other hand, the game was complimented for having a solid engine with crisp visuals that live up to its mainstream contemporaries.
