= BFG Technologies =

Former American hardware company

BFG Tech
- Company type: Private
- Industry: Graphics card, motherboard, power supply, desktop computer and PC accessory manufacturing
- Founded: August 2002; 23 years ago
- Defunct: September 2010; 15 years ago
- Fate: Liquidation; brand and certain assets acquired by Best Data
- Headquarters: Lake Forest, Illinois, U.S.
- Key people: Scott Herkelman (CEO); John Malley (Sr. Dir Marketing) David Ash (Sr Product Mgr)
- Products: Nvidia graphics cards, Nvidia nForce motherboards, computer power supply units, desktop PCs, AGEIA PhysX PPUs

BFG Technologies was a privately held U.S.-based supplier of power supplies and video cards based on Nvidia graphics technology and a manufacturer of high-end gaming/home theater computer systems. BFG Technologies branded products were available in North America and Europe at retailers and e-tailers. The company's main headquarters were located in Lake County, Illinois, near Lake Forest.

== Graphics cards ==
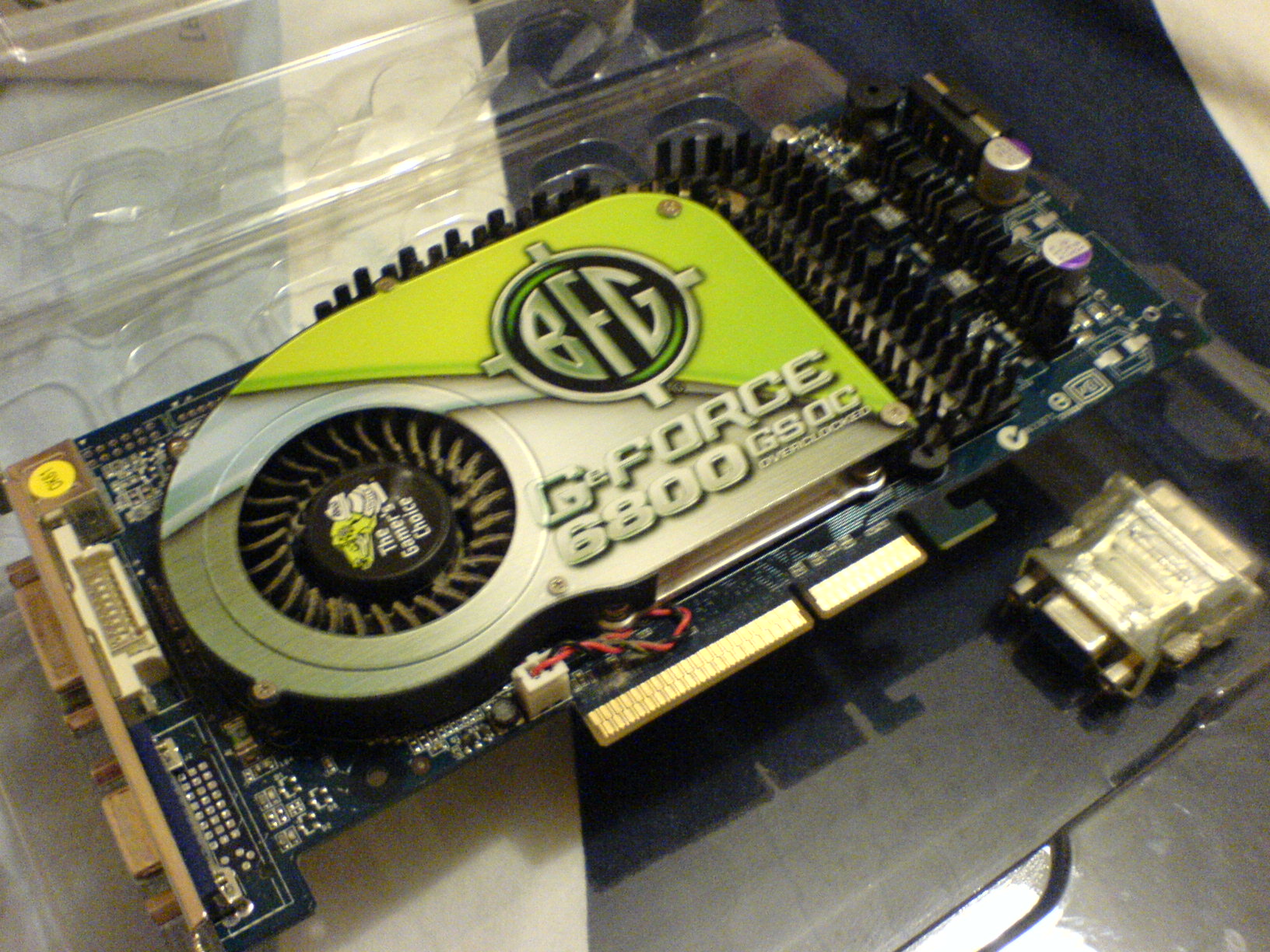
A BFG GeForce 6800 GS OC graphics card

BFG manufactured graphics cards for mainstream to enthusiast level computers. They were known for their Asylum brand; however, the Nvidia 5 series of graphics accelerators were the last to use that name. They were best known by computer enthusiasts for the overclocked (OC) versions of their graphics cards, lifetime warranty and 24/7/365 U.S.-based technical support. BFG was among the first graphics card companies to offer cards that were already overclocked from manufacturer recommended speeds. Since then, many other manufacturers have copied BFG's model.

Their most recent flagship graphics cards were the BFG Nvidia GeForce GTX 285 OCX as an air-cooled solution and the BFG Nvidia GeForce GTX 295 H2OC as a water-cooled solution. While they also manufactured an air-cooled version of the Nvidia GeForce GTX 295, it was not overclocked.

On May 18, 2010, John Slevin the chairman of BFG Technologies, announced that they would no longer be developing graphics cards, as it was not profitable for them.

In August 2010, BFG began the process of liquidation, initially only for the GPU business but eventually expanding to include the entire company. As a result of this, BFG ceased to honor RMA (Return Merchandise Authorization) requests for warranty service, repair, or replacement, instead returning the product to the customer with a short letter explaining the situation. However, PNY Technologies announced that "PNY has stepped up and will be working to give BFG customers the ability to exchange their video cards for a coupon to purchase a PNY Video card at a discounted price". This exchange program ended on December 31, 2010, and PNY is no longer accepting requests for BFG cards. The BFG brand name of the company was subsequently acquired by Best Data, who also owns the Diamond Multimedia brand.

== Desktop computers ==
January 5, 2009, BFG Technologies launched its desktop computer line called Phobos that features a touch panel LCD with performance control, BFG Tech graphic cards, liquid cooling solutions from CoolIT and Intel processors.

== Power supplies ==
BFG Technologies manufactured a full range of power supply units for ATX compatible PCs. BFG's power supply line up had consisted of 530 W, 550 W, 600 W, 650 W, 800 W and 1000 W in the past, but since was refined to separate categories for separate markets.

The GS Series consisted of the GS-450, GS-550 and GS-650, 450 W, 550 W and 650 W power supplies respectively, and were sold as mainstream units, rated at peak power and at room temperature and were sold almost exclusively at retail stores like Best Buy. The LS Series was BFG Technologies mainstream series, consisting of the LS-450 450 W power supply, LS-550 550 W power supply and LS-680 680 W power supply. These were rated at continuous power and at a more realistic 40 °C. The flagship of BFG Technologies' power supply offerings was the ES Series, which only consisted of one model: The ES-800. This unit was not only rated at continuous and 40 °C, but featured a technology marketed as "Frequency Conversion" which is a term used to define a method of changing the switching frequency of the power supply to coincide with load. This allowed the unit to be as efficient as possible even at very low loads while conventional designs might have been significantly less efficient at loads below 10%. The ES Series was later replaced by the EX-Series; essentially an ES Series with a modular interface for removal of unused cables.

== PhysX cards ==
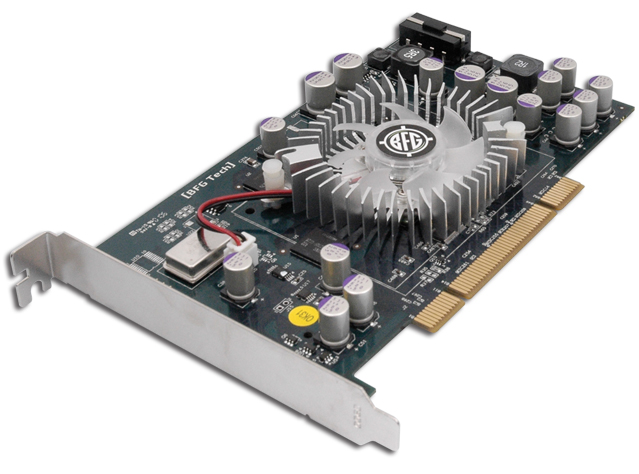
A BFG Physx card

BFG Technologies offered a 128MB PPU that uses Ageia's PhysX processing chip and libraries. The card was only available in a PCI version in retail packages.
