= Céidot Game Studios =

Video game development company

- Industry: Video games
- Founded: 2005
- Defunct: 2014
- Headquarters: Ankara, Turkey
- Key people: Erkan Bayol
- Products: Sovereign Symphony
- Website: www.ceidot.com

Céidot was a video game development company founded in 2005 and headquartered in Ankara, Turkey, with a corporate branch located in Oregon, United States. It closed down in 2014.

== History ==
Céidot was launched in 2005. It was cofounded by Erkan Bayol. It started out in the Cyberplaza of the Bilkent University. Its first project was the game Sovereign Symphony, which was abandoned after the release of the first demo. In 2008, the studio moved to the METU Technopolis and launched Sovereign Symphony Online, the studio's first browser-based multiplayer game project. It also started to work on Football Arena and Umaykut (reached 3 million users, sold to Peak Games in 2010). Foreign investors joined the company in 2009 and the studio eventually reached 35–40 employees. Céidot also created and managed the online game portal Playtak.

In December 2013, the company let go of its last employees, citing long-lived financial difficulties related to management issues. The company shut down its operations on 19 March 2014 when it closed its last game, Céiron Wars. Many former employees of Céidot launched leading video game companies in Turkey afterwards.

== Description ==
Céidot is an official brand of Imengi Design Company, whose counterpart is Céiron Alternative Reality brand, an imaginary design and fiction organization. Céidot's main project is a Windows game called "Sovereign Symphony" which was planned to support realistic 3D short animation films to introduce its scenario. Céidot had partnerships with Emergent Game Technologies, Ageia, Noviy Disk and GameSultan.

== Games ==
- Hükümran Senfoni Online (2008)
- Umaykut Online (2009)
- Céiron Wars (2010)
- Football Arena (2010) (PC, PS3)
- Sovereign Symphony (Cancelled) (PC, PS3, Xbox 360)
