= Scythe Physics Editor =

- Scythe logo
- Developer(s): sf.net - physicseditor
- Stable release: 1.14 / September 11, 2007; 17 years ago
- Written in: C++
- Operating system: Windows
- Type: 3D computer graphics software
- License: GNU GPL
- Website: www.physicseditor.com

Scythe is a free software physics modeling program. It allows the merging of physics and graphics content in one package. It provides native support for modeling the rigid body physics for the Newton Game Dynamics, the Open Dynamics Engine and PhysX engine. The Physics Abstraction Layer also provides support for the Scythe format.

== History ==
The Scythe Physics Editor was first developed as closed source software in 2006. It was released as open source software with a GNU General Public License in September 2007, after the developers decided to focus activities on a new game.

== Features ==
- Allows artists to control the physics environment
- Character and ragdoll editor
- Supports multiple physics engines
- Can create concave hulls for objects

== See also ==
- COLLADA, a COLLAborative Design Activity for establishing an interchange file format for interactive 3D applications, also features physics supports.
