= Meqon =

Physics engine developed by Meqon Research AB

- Developer: Meqon Research AB
- Operating system: Windows, Linux
- Type: Physics engine
- License: Commercial proprietary software
- Website: www.meqon.com

Meqon (formally known as Meqon Game Dynamics) was a real-time physics engine middleware developed by the Swedish software company Meqon Research AB, which were founded in 2002. Designed mainly for video game development, the middleware handled collision detection and rigid-body physics simulations. In September 2005, the company and its technology were acquired by Ageia, and the Meqon engine was subsequently integrated into the PhysX SDK.

== History ==
Meqon Research AB was founded in 2002 in Norrköping, Sweden, with Jonas Lindqvist serving as the key programmer of the engine. The company developed the Meqon engine as a commercial middleware solution for game developers. In September 2004, 3D Realms announced it had licensed the engine for the development of Duke Nukem Forever, ditching the Karma physics engine (from UE2) entirely. 3DRealms project lead George Broussard claimed that Meqon the physics would be superior to the critically acclaimed Half-Life 2, which uses VPhysics (Ipion Virtual Physics). A technology demonstration featuring the engine's destructible environment capabilities was later shown behind closed doors at the 2005 Game Developers Conference.

Throughout 2005, the engine was licensed by several other studios. In April 2005, Illusion Softworks secured a license for future projects, and multiple Russian developers also acquired the technology such as Gaijin Entertainment, which integrated Meqon into the second iteration of its proprietary Dagor Engine, with others such as KranX Productions and Revolt Games licensing it for their respective PC titles. On July 11, 2005, the company released version 1.5 of the SDK.

On September 1, 2005, the American hardware and software company Ageia acquired Meqon Research AB. Following the acquisition, the standalone Meqon engine was merged into the Ageia PhysX SDK, combining Meqon's code with Ageia's prior acquisition of the NovodeX physics engine. The Meqon development team was also absorbed into Ageia, although the company maintained technical support for existing Meqon licensees. Some games were initially built on Meqon, such as Saber Interactive's TimeShift early in its development cycle, eventually transitioned to the competing Havok engine prior to their retail releases.

== Technical features ==
The engine was a cross-platform physics middleware, supporting IBM PC-compatible operating systems (Microsoft Windows, Linux, and Mac OS), as well as the PlayStation 2 and Xbox consoles. The Meqon SDK provided real-time calculations for rigid body dynamics, basic fluid dynamics, wheeled vehicle physics, and ragdoll animation. To encourage adoption, the company temporarily offered a free 30-day evaluation version of the software for independent developers in the spring of 2005.

== Known games using Meqon ==
- ALFA: Antiterror - Advanced War Tactics
- Shade: Wrath of Angels (2004)
- Evil Days of Luckless John (2005)
- Neuro (2006)
- StateShift (2007)
- Duke Nukem Forever (2011)

== See also ==
- Ageia
- PhysX
