= Ageia =

Fabless semiconductor company

Ageia Technologies, Inc.
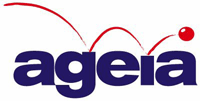
- Industry: Semiconductors
- Founded: 2002
- Defunct: February 13, 2008
- Fate: Acquired by and merged into Nvidia Corporation
- Headquarters: Santa Clara, California, United States
- Key people: Manju Hegde, CEO Curtis Matthew Davis, COO, President, & Co-founder
- Products: Physics Processing Units; Physics engines
- Website: www.ageia.com

Ageia, founded in 2002, was a fabless semiconductor company. In 2004, Ageia acquired NovodeX, the company who created PhysX – a Physics Processing Unit chip capable of performing game physics calculations much faster than general purpose CPUs; it also licensed out the PhysX SDK (formerly NovodeX SDK), a large physics middleware library for game production.

Ageia was noted as being the first company to develop hardware designed to offload calculation of video game physics from the CPU to a separate chip, commercializing it in the form of the Ageia PhysX, a discrete PCI card. Soon after the Ageia implementation of its PhysX processor, ATI and Nvidia announced their own physics implementations.

On September 1, 2005, Ageia acquired Meqon from Meqon Research AB, a physics development company based in Sweden. Known for its forward-looking features and multi-platform support, Meqon earned international acclaim for its physics technology incorporated in 3D Realms’ Duke Nukem Forever and Saber Interactive's TimeShift.

On February 4, 2008, Nvidia announced that it would acquire Ageia. On February 13, 2008, the merger was finalized.

The PhysX engine is now known as Nvidia PhysX, and has been adapted to be run on Nvidia's GPUs.
