= Star Wars: The Force Unleashed II =

2010 video game

- Developer: LucasArts (Note: Wii version developed by Red Fly Studio; Ported to Microsoft Windows by Aspyr.)
- Publisher: LucasArts
- Director: Julio Torres
- Producer: Matthew Fillbrandt
- Designer: Steve Chen
- Programmer: Steve Dykes
- Artist: Matt Omernick
- Writer: Haden Blackman
- Composer: Mark Griskey
- Platforms: iOS; Microsoft Windows; Nintendo DS; PlayStation 3; Xbox 360; Wii
- Release: NA: October 26, 2010; AU: October 27, 2010; EU: October 29, 2010
- Genres: Action-adventure, hack and slash
- Modes: Single-player, multiplayer (Note: Multiplayer available only in Wii version.)

Star Wars: The Force Unleashed II is an action-adventure video game developed and published by LucasArts. It is the second installment of The Force Unleashed multimedia project, and the sequel to Star Wars: The Force Unleashed (2008). The game was released in the United States on October 26, 2010, in Australia on October 27, and throughout Europe on October 29 for the PlayStation 3, Xbox 360, and Wii consoles, as well as Windows and the Nintendo DS and iOS portable devices.

The game takes place approximately six months after the events of the first game, and a year before the film A New Hope (the original Star Wars film). The Force Unleashed II is described as the "dark entry" in the series, and a more personal story for the game's protagonist than the first game. Players control a clone of Starkiller, the first game's protagonist and Darth Vader's secret apprentice who sacrificed himself after helping to form the Rebel Alliance. Vader's attempts to breed a perfect apprentice from the original Starkiller's DNA leads to the creation of the clone who, possessing his predecessor's memories and realizing he will similarly be betrayed, escapes Vader. While on a quest across the galaxy to understand his identity and escape from Vader's influence, Starkiller becomes caught in the war between the Alliance and the Galactic Empire.

Production for The Force Unleashed II transpired over an approximate period of nine months; while it possesses some similarities to the previous game, producers modified several aspects such as the sound effects and gameplay. Sam Witwer again provides the voice and likeness for Starkiller, and several cast members return to voice and provide likeness to their respective roles.

The Force Unleashed II received mixed reviews from critics who praised the graphics and sound design, but criticized the repetitive gameplay, short length, and underwhelming story. During the first few weeks after its release it placed fifth or higher in sales for several regions. This was the last game developed by Lucasarts before its closure in 2013, following Disney's acquisition of Lucasfilm a year prior in 2012. A sequel, entitled Star Wars: The Force Unleashed III, was planned, but it was ultimately cancelled. In 2014, The Force Unleashed project became part of the non-canonical Star Wars Legends continuity and never received a proper conclusion.

== Gameplay ==
The protagonist, known as Starkiller, uses Force lightning on Stormtroopers.

The Force Unleashed II is a third-person action game in which the player's character's weapons are the Force and a lightsaber. The game has a combo system for stringing lightsaber attacks and for combining lightsaber attacks with Force powers. Like the original Force Unleashed, experience points earned by killing enemies and finding artifacts can be used to increase Starkiller's powers and traits.

The Force Unleashed II refines gameplay elements from the first Force Unleashed, and adds more variety with such features as puzzle solving. Combat was modified to include the ability to wield dual lightsabers, which can dismember or decapitate enemies. The game also adds more Force powers, such as "Mind Trick" and "Force Rage".

=== Platform-specific elements ===
According to lead producer Vinde Kudirka, the goal of the game across all platforms is to make the player feel like "a super-powerful Jedi". Executive producer Julio Torres said that while the story is consistent across platforms, gameplay decreases in style across platforms to reflect each platform's uniqueness and strengths. The Wii's control scheme is focused on being able to precisely control Starkiller's Force powers and saber combos. The Wii exclusive "Force rage" power puts the game's protagonist, Starkiller, into a bullet time mode exclusive to that platform; the Wii version also has a Force sight power not included on other platforms. The Wii version also has a multiplayer mode, inspired by The Outfoxies (best known for inspiring the Super Smash Bros. series of fighting games), in which four players can challenge each other in a fighting-style combat game. The Wii game also has an extra story-based level, on Dagobah, that is not present in the HD version of the game, making the plot of the Wii game slightly different from the HD version.

The PC, PlayStation 3, and Xbox 360 versions feature new Force powers, new skins for Force powers that appear in The Force Unleashed, an improved rendering system providing richer colors, and a new audio system. The gameplay also highlights the potential to "destroy" the game environment. Neither of the PC, PlayStation 3 or Xbox 360 versions of the game include multiplayer. The Nintendo DS version features the same Force powers as the console versions, but was designed for shorter play sessions due to its mobile nature.

== Plot ==
At an Imperial facility on the planet Kamino, Darth Vader observes the training of a clone of his former apprentice Starkiller. The clone experiences various memories and visions of Starkiller's life, and is unable to strike down a droid impersonating Starkiller's love interest, Juno Eclipse. Vader labels the clone a failure in his quest to create a perfect apprentice, and the clone remembers Vader's betrayal of Starkiller; realizing Vader will try to have him killed as well, he makes his escape. Stealing Vader's TIE Fighter, the clone leaves in an attempt to understand his identity and escape Vader's influence. Meanwhile, Vader hires the bounty hunter Boba Fett to capture Juno to lure the clone back to him.

Starkiller arrives on the Imperial-controlled planet Cato Neimoidia to rescue Rahm Kota, the original Starkiller's blind Jedi mentor, who is being forced to fight in a gladiatorial arena by the planet's ruler, Baron Merillion Tarko. Tarko quickly becomes distrustful of Starkiller and orders his men to kill him. Starkiller fights his way through the Imperial forces to reach Kota, where Tarko unleashes a gargantuan beast, the Gorog, to kill both men. The Gorog escapes its restraints and destroys the arena, eating Tarko and grabbing Kota before falling off the platform. Starkiller kills the Gorog in free-fall and saves Kota, while the latter calls in the Rogue Shadow, the original Starkiller's ship, to rescue the pair.

Despite the clone's insistence that he is not the real Starkiller and wants nothing to do with the war, Kota asserts that Jedi can't be cloned and invites him to join the Rebel Alliance. Declining, Starkiller drops Kota off at the nearest spaceport and travels to Dagobah, where he meets Jedi Grand Master Yoda and enters a cave that is strong with the Dark Side. Starkiller sees a vision of Juno in peril aboard her medical frigate Salvation, and leaves to rescue her.

Starkiller boards the Salvation with Kota, who reveals that the Rebel Alliance has continued to grow in his absence but that its leadership has become reluctant to attack any major Imperial targets out of fear that their fleet will be destroyed and provides the General with information that could help the Alliance take Kamino. The ship soon comes under attack and both Jedi race to the bridge only to find Juno missing. The original Starkiller's training droid PROXY reveals that experimental Imperial forces led by Fett have infiltrated the ship and captured Juno. Starkiller locates Juno but is too late to stop Fett leaving with her and realizes Vader's plot to lure him back to Kamino. (Note: In the Wii version, Starkiller briefly battles Fett, who distracts him by blowing open the ship's hull to force Starkiller to fix it. Starkiller catches up to Fett's ship, Slave I, and tries to halt it with the Force, only to be attacked by the Terror Walker, allowing Fett to escape with Juno)

After eliminating the Imperial forces aboard the Salvation, Starkiller convinces Kota to order an all-out assault of Kamino. The Rebels arrive at Kamino but are met by the Imperial fleet, who have activated a defensive shield around the planet. Starkiller tells Kota to order an evacuation and crashes the Salvation through the shield. While Kota and his men stage a ground assault, Starkiller confronts Vader, who reveals and commands numerous failed Starkiller clones. Starkiller eliminates the clones and battles Vader to a stalemate. Vader reveals a detained Juno, threatening her life to force Starkiller to surrender and orders him to kill the rebels. Juno attempts to attack Vader with Starkiller's discarded lightsaber, but Vader uses the Force to hurl her out a window onto the ground below, seemingly killing her. (Note: In the Wii version, Vader slams Juno to the ground as soon as Starkiller surrenders to seemingly kill her.) Enraged, Starkiller unleashes the full extent of his powers to defeat Vader, subduing him with force lightning (Note: In the Wii version, Vader is assisted by a few surviving clones. During the battle, Vader hurls a clone and breaks open a power pylon, exposing a huge ball of electricity. Vader tries to hurl Starkiller into it, only for Starkiller to hurl him into it instead, subduing him.) just as Kota and his men arrive. Vader tries to goad Starkiller into killing him, but Kota reasons that they need him alive to reveal the Empire's secrets before he can be placed on trial and executed. At this point, the player is given the choice between sparing Vader (Light Side) or killing him (Dark Side).

- If the player chooses the Light Side, Starkiller spares Vader, who is arrested by the Rebel Alliance. Starkiller runs over to Juno, and mourns her apparent death, but is pleased when she unexpectedly revives and kisses him. Later, Princess Leia Organa makes contact with Juno and Kota and congratulates them for their actions, claiming that Vader's capture marks an important victory for the Alliance. While imprisoned aboard the Rogue Shadow, Vader is confronted by Starkiller, who tells him that by making a choice of his own free will to spare him, he is free of the Dark Lord's influence. Vader responds that as long as Juno lives, he will always have control over Starkiller. The game ends with Starkiller and Juno preparing to travel into hyperspace to transport Vader to Dantooine, unaware of Fett following them. This is the canonical ending of the game, as confirmed by the novelization.
- If the player chooses the Dark Side, Starkiller attempts to kill Vader, but is suddenly impaled from behind by a shrouded figure. After pushing Kota, his men and PROXY into the ocean with the Force, the figure reveals itself as a dark Starkiller clone, while Vader explains to the dying Starkiller that he lied about not being able to perfect the cloning process. After gazing at Juno's corpse, Starkiller succumbs to his wounds and dies. Vader orders his apprentice to take Starkiller's ship and hunt down the leaders of the Rebel Alliance. The dark apprentice looks at Juno's corpse and moves on, uncaring. The game ends with the dark apprentice using the Rogue Shadow to enter hyperspace to follow his orders. In the novelization, this scenario briefly appears in a Force vision Starkiller has on the Salvation while contemplating revenge on Vader.

=== Downloadable content ===
A downloadable content (DLC) level was released in December 2010, providing a continuation of the non-canonical Dark Side ending of the game, with the dark Starkiller clone depicted in said ending as the protagonist. The level is set in a different timeline from any other pieces of Star Wars media, including the first game's own dark alternate timeline depicted in its expansions.

The level takes place during an alternate depiction of Return of the Jedi, primarily the Battle of Endor, where the remnants of the Rebel Alliance lead a desperate attack on the Empire's new battle station, the Death Star II. Darth Vader's trusted apprentice, the dark Starkiller clone, arrives on Endor with special orders to eliminate the Alliance's remaining leaders. Slaughtering numerous Ewoks and Rebel soldiers in his path, he arrives at the shield generator protecting the Death Star, where he kills Han Solo and Chewbacca. The dark apprentice then confronts Princess Leia Organa, who has been training as a Jedi after her brother Luke Skywalker's death on Hoth to fulfill his failed destiny of restoring balance to the Force. Following a fierce duel, the dark apprentice slays Leia. Aboard the Death Star, the Emperor declares the Rebel Alliance defeated, then subdues Vader with Force lightning while chastising him for resurrecting his failed apprentice as a clone, claiming he knew of Vader's plans to overthrow him using the clone from their inception. The Emperor orders his forces to kill Starkiller. As the dark apprentice meditates near Leia's corpse, he senses Star Destroyers nearby.

== Development ==
Following the commercial success of its predecessor, a sequel was formally announced at the Spike Video Game Awards. The game was released for the PlayStation 3, Xbox 360, and Nintendo Wii consoles, as well as the Nintendo DS and iOS portable devices. A version was initially developed for the PlayStation Portable, but was cancelled for undisclosed reasons. The Force Unleashed II was released in North America on October 26, 2010, in Australia on October 27, 2010 and in Europe on October 29, 2010.

=== Writing ===
Haden Blackman served as a writer for the sequel, and was only given a mere 3 weeks by Lucasarts to write the game's script. In crafting the dialogue of The Force Unleashed II, Blackman sought influence from Darksiders (2010), as well as other video games such as Uncharted 2: Among Thieves (2009) and Heavy Rain (2010). In the wake the early stages of conceiving The Force Unleashed II, the main protagonist Starkiller was initially intended to be replaced with a new lead character, but such plans never materialized as LucasArts opted to develop more backstory for the character. As the character progression of Starkiller initiates, the story follows a dark nature—much like its predecessor. Blackman suggested that as opposed to his empathic tendencies in The Force Unleashed, Starkiller becomes conflicted with his loss of an identity, ultimately culminating into what he called a "much more personal story"; "He's dealing with a sense of identity and not knowing whether he's going insane or not," he added, "and the possible collapse of the Rebel Alliance, and his being torn between what he wants and what Kota wants." Blackman's main objective was to have the storyline be attractive to a broad audience; while he asserted that fans with a general understanding of the Star Wars franchise would be more enthralled with the storyline, Blackman emphasized the need to appeal to a more mainstream demographic. "With The Force Unleashed II again we're trying to create a story that if you've played The Force Unleashed," explained the comic book writer, "you're going to know a bit more going into it, but hopefully the story still stands on its own and you can enjoy it even if you haven't played [the first game], whether or not you're familiar with all the continuity."

To avoid any perceived continuity constraints, they would travel to the headquarters of Lucasfilm in San Francisco, California to give an overview of their plans. "With The Force Unleashed II, remarked Blackman, "because we'd already established this notion of Darth Vader's secret apprentice, really it was just sitting down with licensing and saying 'this is what we want to do' and getting a few pieces of feedback from them."

=== Cast ===
The primary cast from the previous game returns to voice their characters again in The Force Unleashed II. Sam Witwer returns to provide both the likeness and voice of Starkiller, the game's protagonist. He also voices Emperor Palpatine having earned the part during a read-through of the script during development. Witwer petitioned David Collins, voice of PR0XY and audio lead for the game. He told Collins that "if [he was not] going to get Ian McDiarmid to do this [...] I'll do it." Actress and model Nathalie Cox reprises her role as Juno Eclipse, as does Cully Fredrickson as General Rahm Kota. Matt Sloan, who portrays Darth Vader in the webseries Chad Vader: Day Shift Manager and voices Vader in the original The Force Unleashed returns to the role in The Force Unleashed II. Veteran Star Wars: The Clone Wars voice actors Tom Kane and Dee Bradley Baker are also included amongst the cast. Kane voices Jedi Master Yoda, a role he has provided several times within the Star Wars franchise. Baker voices bounty hunter Boba Fett, a clone and adopted son of Jango Fett. Baker provides the voice of all of the clone troopers in the Clone Wars series, of which Boba is one.

=== Technology ===
The Force Unleashed II derives from LucasArts' Ronin 2.0 game engine, an update to a similarly named proprietary game engine used by its predecessor. Like The Force Unleashed, the game integrates three third-party technologies: Havok for varying types of body physics such as ragdoll animation, NaturalMotion's Euphoria for realistic non-player character artificial intelligence, and Digital Molecular Matter for dynamic destructible objects. Blackman felt the second game takes better advantage of the powerful engine than does the first game. LucasArts acknowledged players' frustration with the first game's targeting system, and worked to revise it in the sequel; Blackman said fixing the Force grip feature was the developers' top priority. The game also includes fewer enemy types, instead focusing on making enemies more "'special and unique'"; the game was also designed to offer "epic" boss battles. Other adjustments include allowing players to dismember enemy characters and improving menu speeds.

The game is AMD Eyefinity validated.

==== Sound effects ====
The audio engine received a massive overhaul to upgrade the quality of sound effects. Brian Tibbetts was declared the lead sound designer of the sound effects team, resuming his endeavors from The Force Unleashed. David Collins, who formerly served as the lead sound designer, sustained a supervisory position. The sound effects team was divided to address specific details; Tom Bible was in charge of creating sound for weapons and force powers, while Aaron Brown specialized in the spaceships. Although some effects were borrowed from The Force Unleashed, the vast majority of sounds were completely new. Tibbetts thought that collaborating with his peers to be one of the most complex and challenging parts of his job. "I chose to have my office in the main area of game development and always had an open door policy regarding communication with other disciplines. There were many meetings regarding asset changes and in general communication at Lucasarts is good between disciplines. I've always stressed that we should work together as much as possible and there were many moments of myself and sound designers working directly with designers, artists, and producers at their desks or ours."

The nine-month schedule of The Force Unleashed II caused difficulties with Tibbetts, who found it frustrating to keep up with the frenetic schedule. "There are many different ways to integrate our audio assets including scripting or placing sound emitters directly inside environment art and our work was unfortunately blown out many times," he stated. As production neared its conclusion, Tibbets created an emailing system with a group of engineers that would notify them after audio reference was edited. According to Tibbetts, "This helped a lot especially as the responsible parties didn't realize or intend to blow us out and were more than happy to help resolve the situation. By the time this tool was built though, we had already had to re-author/integrate excessively though which is always frustrating."

==== Special effects ====
Dmitry Andreev devised a framing system that gave the illusion of operating at 60 frames per second (FPS), despite running at 30FPS. To familiarize himself with the process, Andreev observed various 120 Hz television sets that incorporated two frames in producing an intermediate image, resulting in a smoother and clearer picture. The design team utilized a variety of interpolation techniques on multiple parts of an image, such as transparency and reflection. Andreev stated that "as soon as I got back home, I started to play with it and soon after that realised that there are a lot of issues. Mostly the artifacts of a different kind, that appear in more or less complex scenes, as well as performance issues [...]." In response to the difficulties, he constructed a prototype that performed several enhancement techniques which examined images for vectors that demonstrated how "elements of the image would move from one frame to the next". The LucasArts coder realized that such processes could be repackaged for a different use. "We already know how things are moving as we have full control over them. This way we don't need to do any kind of estimation," he professed.

Interpolating the graphics in 30FPS was opted due to the large variety of rendering technologies that were practical to developers, as well as a less stringent time schedule. Although Andreev felt that it was not impossible to produce a video game in 60FPS graphics, he felt that it would require much more rigorous efforts on art, engineering, and design. "It is fair to say that in a lot of cases," he explained, "during pre-production, studios try to see what it would take to make a 60FPS game. Then, they get something that doesn't look very pretty when running at 60, realising that all the art has to be produced very carefully as well as level and game design."

== Cast ==
- Sam Witwer: Starkiller / Aberrant Clones / Emperor Palpatine
- Cully Fredricksen: General Rahm Kota
- Matt Sloan: Darth Vader
- Nathalie Cox: Juno Eclipse
- David W. Collins: PROXY
- Dee Bradley Baker: Merillion Tarko / Boba Fett
- Tom Kane: Yoda
- Catherine Taber: Princess Leia Organa

== Reception ==
=== Commercial performance ===
The Force Unleashed II performed under expectations. In the United States, it sold 500,000 copies within its first two weeks, thereby becoming the fifth best-selling video game of October 2010. The Force Unleashed II was the fifth-highest selling game of the week in the United Kingdom, denoting sales of 56,064 copies. In Sweden, The Force Unleashed II was the third best-selling overall game of the week; the PlayStation 3 version of the game topped its respective chart, while the Xbox 360 version trailed behind Fable 3 as the second-best selling Xbox 360 game of the week.

=== Critical response ===
Reception

Aggregate scores
Aggregator	Score				
Aggregator	DS	PC	PS3	Wii	Xbox 360
GameRankings	42.25%	56.60%	63.94%	69.17%	62.76%
Metacritic	43/100	59/100	63/100	71/100	61/100

Review scores
Publication	Score				
Publication	DS	PC	PS3	Wii	Xbox 360
Eurogamer					5/10
Game Informer			7.75/10		7.75/10
GamePro					2.5/5
GameSpot		5.5/10	6.0/10	7.5/10	6.0/10
GamesRadar+			8/10		8/10
GameTrailers					6.3/10
IGN	4.0/10	6.5/10	6.5/10	7.5/10	6.5/10
Nintendo Power				80%	

Commentators were divided on The Force Unleashed II. The Observer columnist Toby Moses avouched that the game failed to live up to the expectations established by its predecessor. Alexander Sliwinski of Joystiq derided it as a "desperate cash grab", which had no intentions of aspiring to be a "major part of lore or to be nearly as epic" as The Force Unleashed. "It simply cobbles together glorified fan fiction for what amounts to an unexceptional subplot as it abruptly ends in the second act screaming, 'SEQUEL GOES HERE'," remarked Sliwinski. Despite proclaiming that The Force Unleashed II had "dazzling" gameplay, The Washington Times' journalist Joseph Szadkowski concluded that it was "one of the most underachieving games of the year". In his 6.5 out of 10 rating review, Anthony Gallegos of IGN stated that The Force Unleashed II immediately captivates the audience with its visuals, albeit being plagued with repetitious gameplay, a "shoe-horned in story", and a nonexistent depth "in the experience". "Scenery is, of course, massive and massively impressive, and the possible repetitive nature has been broken up with some freefalling levels and the odd exploratory moment," commented Neil Davey of The Guardian, who issued the game a four out of five stars.

Game Informer' Andrew Reiner said the game's mechanics are more fluid than the first game's, and praised the textures and animations as "among this generation's best". GamePro's Mitch Dyer and Matthew Keast of GamesRadar highlighted the game's variety of lightsaber crystals and their ability to boost Starkiller's powers. Keast observed that LucasArts seemed to take player feedback from the first game seriously, and made numerous subtle improvements for the sequel. He also praised "substantial" improvements to the Force grip power, although Alexander Sliwinski of Eurogamer did not detect any improvements. The Writers Guild of America nominated the game for its Outstanding Achievement in Video Game Writing recognition.

John Teti of Eurogamer said the game overall "feels like it was created out of obligation rather than inspiration", and points toward Blackman's departure from LucasArts before the game's release as a potential sign of trouble. IGN's Anthony Gallegos criticized the game's repetitive level design and underdeveloped story. He also felt that because Starkiller begins the game as a powerful character, leveling up does not feel as satisfying as in the first game; while the game does offer increased variety in enemy types that "occasionally present a challenge", defeating them eventually becomes formulaic. Andrew Reiner of Game Informer criticized the story and the dissatisfying appearances by Boba Fett and Yoda. GameSpot's Kevin VanOrd called the final battle repetitive, and that the game's end sequence erases the story's dramatic tension. The Force Unleashed II was later one of GameSpot's nominees for "Least Improved Sequel of 2010". GamePro's Mitch Dyer faulted several performance issues and the game's brief, unfocused story. The downloadable content was poorly received by Luke Plunkett of Kotaku, who criticized the murder of Han Solo and Chewbacca depicted in the expansion.

Nintendo Power praised the Wii version's multiplayer mode, as did Lucas M. Thomas of IGN. GameSpot's Kevin VanOrd was more critical of the multiplayer, calling it "unspectacular". VanOrd did go on to praise the game's art, combat, and control scheme.

== Cancelled sequel ==
Sam Witwer and Haden Blackman stated during an interview in February 2013 that Lucasfilm was considering the development of Star Wars: The Force Unleashed III for the next generation video game consoles PlayStation 4, Xbox One and Wii U. However, after LucasArts was closed by The Walt Disney Company due to the purchase of Lucasfilm, The Force Unleashed III was cancelled among other planned Star Wars video games, like Star Wars 1313. In November 2015, one month before the release of Star Wars: Episode VII - The Force Awakens, Blackman revealed that The Force Unleashed III would have been more open-world and seen Starkiller and Darth Vader team-up to fight a new threat from Emperor Palpatine.
