= Bad Rats =

2009 video game

Bad Rats: The Rats' Revenge
- Steam storefront header
- Developer: Invent4 Entertainment
- Publisher: Invent4 Entertainment
- Designer: Augusto Bülow
- Programmer: Augusto Bülow
- Artists: Carlos Alberto Kunkel Bülow; Mateus "Mes" Silva Brum; Gustavo Bülow
- Composer: Márcio Stein
- Platform: Windows
- Release: 20 July 2009
- Genre: Puzzle
- Mode: Single-player

Bad Rats: The Rats' Revenge is a 2009 puzzle video game developed by Invent4 Entertainment. Over a string of levels, the player places a set of rats and static objects to guide a ball towards a trap that kills a cat. Bad Rats was released as Invent4 Entertainment's debut game on 20 July 2009 via Steam, followed by releases on other services in 2010. While it received no reviews at release, retrospective pieces criticised the game's graphics, puzzles, and physics. Bad Rats is considered an oddity for having been released on Steam while the platform's catalogue was still hand-curated. It became a popular gag gift on Steam, leading to more than 400,000 owners by 2018. A sequel, Bad Rats Show, was released on the seventh anniversary of Bad Rats in 2016.

== Gameplay ==
Rats and objects used to solve puzzles are stored in the inventory in front of each level.

Bad Rats is a physics-based puzzle video game in a style similar to The Incredible Machine and Armadillo Run. In each level, the player is tasked with arranging (by moving and rotating) a set of rats and static objects in a way that steers a ball towards a trap. The ball's contact with the trap causes it to activate, killing the nearby cat. The game offers a tutorial and two modes: In "Easy" mode, the inventory is limited and the solution to each level can be displayed. "Expert" mode provides the entire inventory, including all ten kinds of rats, and no solutions. Hints for each level are available in both modes.

== Development and release ==
Bad Rats was developed by Invent4 Entertainment, an indie game studio based in Porto Alegre. It was the company's first game, after it was founded by Augusto Bülow on 4 April 2009. Bülow provided the concept for the game and acted as its programmer and level designer. Carlos Alberto Kunkel Bülow designed the 3D models and their animations, while graffiti imagery was provided by Mateus "Mes" Silva Brum. Additional art was created by Gustavo Bülow, and music and sound design were done by Márcio Stein.

A demo of Bad Rats was released through Invent4 Entertainment's website on 20 May 2009. This demo was downloaded more than 20,000 times by August that year, and an updated version was published in November. Bad Rats was released via Steam on 20 July 2009. It was made available through Invent4 Entertainment's website in January 2010, as well as on GamersGate and Direct2Drive in February 2010. In April that year, the company announced partnerships that would see Bad Rats (and future games) released by Strategy First in North America, by Akella in Russia, and by Micromedia in the Netherlands.

== Reception ==
In a 2015 retrospective, Nathan Grayson of Kotaku stated that the game remained the worst game available on Steam. In particular, he criticised the game's "shoddy" puzzles and "inconsistent" physics. This sentiment was echoed by Max Scoville and Brian Altano of IGN later that year. In 2018, Adam Heron of Hardcore Gaming 101 described Bad Rats as "possibly ... the worst physics-based puzzle game of all time". He criticised the "hideous, grungy urban art direction" and its low-quality textures, and described the improper physics as the game's "fatal flaw", especially due to the randomness applied to scenarios Heron believed should be static. He further faulted the game's user interface, which he considered unfriendly and unintuitive. Richard Cobbett and Wes Fenlon of PC Gamer included the cover art of Bad Rats in their list of the "worst PC game box art ever", calling it a "monstrosity".

== Legacy ==
According to Grayson, Bad Rats was an oddity on Steam when it was released, as the platform's catalogue was still hand-curated by its owner, Valve, before the launch of the Steam Greenlight programme in 2012. Augusto Bülow stated that Bad Rats only became popular several years after its release, after negative reviews by popular YouTubers turned attention toward the game. Bad Rats became an internet meme and was frequently used as a gag gift by Steam users. Many users penned sarcastic positive reviews, resulting in an overall positive review score for the game. In a 2016 interview, Bülow said that he was happy with this situation, saying that, because Bad Rats had been "planned to be funny", "If people are laughing while playing the game, that's fine. The game reached its objectives." In July 2018, based on leaked Steam player counts, Bad Rats was estimated to have 476,787 unique players on the platform.

According to Bülow, a sequel to Bad Rats was planned from the outset, originally with the intent of including dogs alongside cats. A second Bad Rats game was teased through videos, starting in December 2014, and announced as Bad Rats Show in a trailer during E3 2016. It was released on 20 July 2016, the seventh anniversary of Bad Rats. In December 2019, Bülow announced Bad Rats 3. He intended to release it on 20 July 2023—the fourteenth anniversary of the original game—but this target was missed.
