= Endorphin (disambiguation) =

Endorphins are opioid neuropeptides in mammals.

Endorphin may also refer to:

- Endorphin (software), A dynamic real-time motion synthesis software from NaturalMotion
- Endorphin (band), an electronic act from Cairns, Australia
- "Endorphin", a song by the musical metal band August Burns Red on their album Thrill Seeker
- "Endorphins" (song), a 2013 song by Sub Focus with vocals from Alex Clare

Alternative spelling

- Endorphine (band), Thai pop singing group from the GMM Grammy records company, Bangkok, Thailand
- Endorphine (film), a 2015 Canadian film

== See also ==
- Endorfun, a 1995 single-player puzzle computer game
