= Indiana Jones and the Staff of Kings =

2009 video game

- Developers: Artificial Mind & Movement; Amaze Entertainment (PSP)
- Publisher: LucasArts
- Director: David Osborne
- Producer: Stéphane Roy
- Designers: Stéphane Brochu; Jason Dozois
- Programmers: Jean-Sébastien Dasse; Frédéric Robichaud; Dominic Allaire
- Artists: Ghislain Barbe; Mathieu Fecteau
- Composers: Gordy Haab; Ray Harman
- Platforms: Nintendo DS, PlayStation 2, PlayStation Portable, Wii
- Release: NA: June 9, 2009; EU: June 12, 2009; AU: June 18, 2009
- Genre: Action-adventure
- Modes: Single-player, multiplayer

Indiana Jones and the Staff of Kings is a 2009 action-adventure video game developed by Artificial Mind & Movement and published by LucasArts for Nintendo DS, PlayStation 2, and Wii. Amaze Entertainment developed a PlayStation Portable version. The game is set in 1939, after the events of the original Indiana Jones film trilogy. It focuses on Indiana Jones as he searches for his former mentor Charles Kingston, while working to prevent the Nazis from acquiring the "Staff of Kings", said to be the same staff used by Moses to split the Red Sea in two. The Wii version includes a copy of a previous LucasArts game, Indiana Jones and the Fate of Atlantis, as an unlockable.

The game was announced in 2005, and was initially developed for the higher-end PlayStation 3 and Xbox 360 systems, before switching to the aforementioned lower-end platforms. The game received mixed reviews from critics.

== Gameplay ==
A notable feature of the game is the “Hot Set” system, which allows nearly any object in the environment to serve as a tool or weapon.Players can pick up, throw, or smash items such as crates, chairs, or bottles, using them to defeat enemies, trigger traps, or solve puzzles. Many challenges involve manipulating the environment, swinging across gaps, pulling levers, breaking barriers, or clearing obstacles to progress. Combat emphasizes close-quarters brawling, grappling, and counterattacks, with the whip providing both offensive and traversal functionality. The whip can disarm enemies, drag them into hazards, swing across ledges, and manipulate distant objects, while interactions remain context-sensitive to ensure precise timing and strategic play.

Rail-shooter sequences feature Indy’s sidearm in restricted arenas, where cover-based tactics and limited ammunition encourage deliberate targeting rather than rapid firing.Vehicle and chase sequences include motorcycles, biplanes, rafts, and occasionally elephants, combining navigation, combat, and timed reactions to provide cinematic variety and break up standard exploration. Puzzles require environmental manipulation, timing, and logic, ranging from rope swings and lever activation to cipher-based mini-games and timed sequences. Quick-time events simulate collapsing ruins or trap avoidance, creating tension and cinematic engagement.

The Wii version uses motion controls via the Wii Remote and Nunchuk, translating gestures into punches, whip swings, grabs, and environmental interactions.This allows players to physically mimic Indiana Jones’ movements, enhancing immersion. The DS version relies on stylus-based input, where swipes and taps control punches, whip actions, and puzzle-solving mechanics. Top-screen visuals often provide environmental context while the bottom touchscreen facilitates direct interaction. PlayStation 2 and PSP versions rely on traditional analog stick and button controls, emphasizing precision and stability over motion or touch inputs. Platform-specific variations affect puzzle design, enemy placement, and traversal challenges, tailoring the gameplay experience to the hardware capabilities.

The Wii version includes an exclusive cooperative story mode in which players control Indiana Jones and his father, Henry Jones Sr., working together to solve puzzles and defeat enemies. Additionally, it features a fully playable unlockable version of Indiana Jones and the Fate of Atlantis, set in 1939. Across console releases, unlockables include “Big Head” mode, alternate character skins such as Henry Jones Sr., Tuxedo Indy, and a special unlockable appearance by Han Solo from Star Wars.

The Wii’s motion control system allows players to execute a wide array of combat and traversal maneuvers. Punches, uppercuts, hooks, and grapples are performed through specific gestures, while whip interactions are context-sensitive and require careful timing. In cooperative play, gestures can be combined between the two players to manipulate objects or defeat enemies in tandem, making puzzles and combat encounters more dynamic. Vehicle and chase sequences on Wii employ tilting and pointing mechanics to steer and shoot simultaneously, creating a more interactive experience compared to standard button-based controls on other consoles.

On the DS, stylus mechanics influence both combat and environmental navigation. Players swipe across the touchscreen to punch or use the whip, tap to pick up objects, and drag items to solve puzzles. Many DS puzzles emphasize careful finger movements, such as guiding water beads through labyrinths or timing stylus taps to avoid traps. The top-screen displays environmental hazards, enemy positions, and puzzle context, allowing for strategic planning before interacting on the touchscreen. Combat often requires players to anticipate enemy positions and execute stylus gestures quickly, creating a unique tactile challenge absent in other versions.

PlayStation 2 and PSP versions focus on traditional button inputs for precise control. Combat, whip use, and object manipulation rely on combinations of buttons and the analog stick, offering greater reliability in high-intensity combat and platforming sequences. While lacking motion-based immersion, these versions present fewer issues with misregistered actions or imprecise timing. Puzzle complexity is adapted to suit standard controls, with some sections featuring more straightforward environmental navigation compared to handheld or motion-controlled versions.

== Plot ==
The story begins with Indiana Jones hunting for an ancient ram's head idol in the Sudan in 1939, which a Nazi expedition is also searching for. Indy traverses a canyon and enters the temple of the idol. After a few narrow escapes, including fighting off a swarm of spiders and nearly getting crushed by collapsing statues, Indy finds the idol and is about to escape when the Nazis discover him. Indy is confronted by their leader, Magnus Voller, an archeologist and old rival of Indy's. Indy is forced to give up the idol but is able to distract Voller and fight his way through the Nazi camp. He gets in a truck and chases after a plane that is taking off down the runway; he manages to jump onto the wing and throw the pilot out. After getting in a dogfight with other Nazi planes, Indy flies off and returns to the United States.

Back in America, Indiana receives a letter from an old friend, antique collector Archie Tan. He explains that he has information about the disappearance of Indy's former college professor, Charles Kingston. Indy heads to San Francisco to talk to Archie, only to find that he and his granddaughter Suzie have been kidnapped by the local triad. Indy rescues Suzie, and she takes him to her grandfather's office. He also learns of an ancient artifact that Archie was guarding, the Jade Sphere. Indy finds a secret passageway, and then rides a rickety chair lift down into a subterranean chamber filled with old ships. The chairlift gets hit by a thug with a pistol, but Indy manages to survive the ride down. He meets more thugs down below but dispatches them before finding the Jade Sphere hidden in a pile of cannonballs. A day later, Indy finds Archie being held captive by Magnus Voller and a Nazi agent. Voller orders Indy to hand over the Sphere if he wants to save his friend. Indy appears to throw the Sphere to Voller before he and Archie flee, but it turns out to be nothing but a cheap statue. Indy and Archie are chased by gunmen in cars; Indy uses his pistol to shoot out the tires or engines of the cars (in the Nintendo DS version, this is replaced by a brawl on top of a cable car), and Archie helps him escape in a street trolley. After Archie tells Indy about the events that transpired, he decides to head for Panama, where Kingston found the Sphere years ago.

Upon reaching his destination, Indy gets into a minor argument with an Irish photographer named Maggie O'Mally, who forces him to let her accompany him. However, their campsite and the surrounding forest are attacked by native mercenaries in Magnus' employment. Indy manages to fend off the attackers (he also saves a village of Indians in the Wii and PS2 versions) and obtains the key to an ancient pyramid. Indy travels through the ruined pyramid, which is based on the Mayan underworld, which leads to a hidden diary of Kingston's revealing details of the Staff of Kings, the artifact that Moses used to part the Red Sea. After obtaining further clues on the staff's location in Istanbul (Paris in the DS version), Indy locates the elderly Kingston in a Nepalese village. Unfortunately, the Nazis followed Indiana to the Staff's resting place and kidnapped Kingston and Maggie (who is actually an undercover MI6 agent). Indy then sneaks onto the Nazis' zeppelin, the Odin, and rescues Maggie, but is unable to prevent Magnus from fatally shooting Kingston and using the Staff to clear a path through the Red Sea. In response, Indy and Maggie chase Magnus on a motorcycle with a sidecar and defeat him with a rocket launcher. Magnus then attempts to escape, but Indy sucker-punches him into the wall of water. Upon reaching dry land, the staff unleashes a blast that causes the water to sink the Odin. It then turns into a snake, and Indy throws it away, lamenting "Ugh.. It can take care of itself...".

== Development ==
LucasArts began developing the game in 2004, for PlayStation 3 (PS3) and Xbox 360. The development team had more than 150 people. Industrial Light & Magic worked on the game's lighting. The game's story is particularly inspired by the Indiana Jones film Raiders of the Lost Ark (1981). The story was devised by producers and team members at LucasArts who then took it to Indiana Jones filmmakers George Lucas and Steven Spielberg for input. A rejected story idea revolved around the Monkey King, who had also been considered for what ultimately became Indiana Jones and the Last Crusade (1989).

The game was announced in May 2005 and was scheduled for release in 2007. It was expected to be technologically advanced, and would have utilized a run-time animation technology known as Euphoria. LucasArts also partnered with Pixelux Entertainment to use its Digital Molecular Matter (DMM) technology in the game, increasing the realism of its environments. The development team encountered problems in making the game physics work together. According to game designer Tony Rowe, "We had to combine the two [engines], but the two didn't talk to each other. You had a Euphoria object that worked with Havoc, which is a pretty standard physics system, and a DMM object and when they hit each other they would go right through each other". LucasArts eventually got the physics to work in Star Wars: The Force Unleashed (2008), a Star Wars title that was another one of its games in development at the time.

Tentatively known as Indiana Jones 2007, the first trailer was released in May 2006. Development was 20-percent finished at the time and its story was supposed to tie-in with the then-upcoming Indiana Jones and the Kingdom of the Crystal Skull (2008), with the developers having received a version of the screenplay from Lucas during the process. Although LucasArts was developing the game for PS3 and Xbox 360, versions for other consoles were also underway by third-party developers hired by the company. Artificial Mind and Movement worked on versions for the PlayStation 2 (PS2), Nintendo DS and Wii, while Amaze Entertainment worked on a PlayStation Portable (PSP) version.

Progress on LucasArts' version stalled compared to the third-party versions, and the game eventually missed its 2007 release. That year, LucasArts transferred much of its development team from the Indiana Jones game to work instead on Star Wars: The Force Unleashed. A new LucasArts design team took over the Indiana Jones project and largely started from scratch, while retaining the story. Uncharted: Drake's Fortune (2007), an action-adventure game developed by Naughty Dog, was released at the end of 2007. It accomplished much of what LucasArts had wanted to achieve with its Indiana Jones game, taking away enthusiasm for the latter. Layoffs at LucasArts occurred in early 2008, and leadership changes were frequent, although development continued on the Indiana Jones game for the time being. LucasArts ultimately canceled its PS3/Xbox 360 version, which was largely unfinished. The company later cited timing and financial reasons as the cause of cancellation.

Reports emerged in January 2009 that the game had been scrapped. Later that month, LucasArts announced that the externally developed versions would be released under the title Indiana Jones and the Staff of Kings. These versions use the same storyline as the canceled game, and were designed to take advantage of each platform's capabilities, such as the Wii's motion controls and the DS' touchscreen. Each version includes a few unique levels. For the Wii version, Artificial Mind and Movement suggested the inclusion of Indiana Jones and the Fate of Atlantis (1992) early on in development. The game includes Indiana Jones music previously composed by John Williams, as well as music from The Young Indiana Jones Chronicles (1992-1993). It also features original music by Gordy Haab and Ray Harman. Indiana Jones is voiced in the game by John Armstrong.

Author Rob MacGregor, who had written several Indiana Jones novels, was hired by LucasArts to write a novelization of the game. Although the book was completed, MacGregor's publisher decided there was not enough interest to warrant its release. In 2021, MacGregor published a series of audiobook podcasts retelling the novelization's story.

In January 2025, the PlayStation 2 version was released for the PlayStation 4 and PlayStation 5.

== Reception ==
Reception

Aggregate score
| Aggregator | Score | | | |
| Aggregator | DS | PS2 | PSP | Wii |
|---|---|---|---|---|
| Metacritic | 50/100 | 55/100 | 63/100 | 55/100 |

Review scores
| Publication | Score | | | |
| Publication | DS | PS2 | PSP | Wii |
|---|---|---|---|---|
| The A.V. Club | N/A | N/A | N/A | F |
| Edge | N/A | N/A | N/A | 3/10 |
| Eurogamer | N/A | N/A | N/A | 5/10 |
| Game Informer | N/A | N/A | N/A | 5/10 |
| GamePro | N/A | N/A | N/A | 3.5/5 |
| GameSpot | 6/10 | N/A | N/A | 3.5/10 |
| IGN | N/A | N/A | N/A | 5/10 |
| Jeuxvideo.com | 9/20 | 10/20 | 14/20 | 13/20 |
| NGamer | 61% | N/A | N/A | 69% |
| Nintendo Life | N/A | N/A | N/A | 6/10 |
| Nintendo Power | N/A | N/A | N/A | 7.5/10 |
| PlayStation Official Magazine – UK | N/A | 5/10 | N/A | N/A |
| Retro Gamer | N/A | N/A | N/A | 62% |
| The Telegraph | N/A | N/A | N/A | 5/10 |
| Teletext GameCentral | N/A | N/A | N/A | 4/10 |

Indiana Jones and the Staff of Kings received "mixed or average reviews" according to Metacritic.

Several critics reviewed the Wii version. IGN praised its interface, graphic effects, number of extras, interactive levels, and varied gameplay, but criticized its "stupidly implemented motion controls". The A.V. Club called the motion controls "inexcusable" and stated the game's best aspect was the inclusion of the point-and-click adventure Indiana Jones and the Fate of Atlantis. GameSpot criticized its "terribly laid-out checkpoints", "out-of-date" visuals, and "atrocious, annoying motion controls".
