= Clumsy Ninja =

- Developer: NaturalMotion
- Publisher: NaturalMotion
- Composer: Rich Aitken
- Engine: Euphoria
- Platforms: iOS, Android
- Release: November 21, 2013
- Genre: Action-adventure

Clumsy Ninja is an action-adventure video game for iOS and Android, developed and published by NaturalMotion in 2013. In the game the player trains a ninja by having them complete tasks in order to gain experience points. Within its first week of release, Clumsy Ninja was downloaded more than 10 million times.

== Story ==
The story is told from a third person perspective by the ninja clue book. The main aim of the game is to save Clumsy Ninja's training partner and friend Kira from Hori-Bull, who aims to find the Dragon Medallion. Kira finds the Dragon Medallion before Hori, but loses it as Hori-Bull weakened her with a jelly potion to make her limbs weak. He then traveled to the temple region, bringing Kira with him. Kira manages to write a warning on one of her diary pages and give it to her squirrel friend, who soon brings it to Clumsy and friends. Clumsy Ninja, Lily, the chicken, the squirrel, and the Sensei arrive to the temple environment/area to find Kira and save her from Hori-Bull. Clumsy, with the others, also find Kira's sword. They unlock the dojo, only to find Kira and Hori-Bull as stone statues. Upon freeing the duo, a fight ensues. Clumsy deflects an attack from Hori-Bull and catches the Dragon Medallion in mid-air, becoming the Dragon Medallion Keeper. Hori-Bull escapes, leaving his helmet behind.

== Gameplay ==
Gameplay centers around training the ninja and improving their "ninja skills". The player can train the ninja by doing certain activities such as: playing hide and seek, playing on the trampoline, training with a punching bag and many other activities to earn experience (xp). As the ninja improves his skills he earns new belts. Another big part of the game is traveling the country and completing quests, doing so will unlock new items that can be used to further train the ninja, along with unlocking more of the game's story.

== Development ==
Clumsy Ninja is the first mobile game to use the Euphoria physics engine. The game was originally announced for 'holiday season' 2012, however it was delayed by almost a year. It eventually appeared worldwide on the App Store on 21 November 2013. On release, Clumsy Ninja became the first app to be promoted with a video trailer embedded in the App Store.

== Reception ==
Reception

Aggregate score
Aggregator	Score
Metacritic	78/100

Review scores
Publication	Score
Gamezebo	4/5
Macworld	3.5/5
Pocket Gamer	3.5/5
TouchArcade	4/5
National Post	6.5/10

The game received "generally favorable reviews" according to the review aggregation website Metacritic. TouchArcade said, "NaturalMotion has created something very impressive and they clearly want to show off their little ninja and what he can do..."

Clumsy Ninja received 10 million downloads as of December 2013.

== See also ==
- List of ninja video games
- Procedural animation
