= Free Rider HD =

2013 video game

- Developers: Kano/Apps; One More Level
- Platforms: Web browser; iOS; Android
- Release: 2013: Web browser 2013 Mobile 2017
- Genre: Racing

Free Rider HD is a platform racing browser game developed by Canadian studio Kano/Apps and One More Level, with player-created levels. It was released on web browsers in 2014 and brought to mobile devices (iOS and Android operating systems) in 2017. As of 2025, it has over 900,000 player-created tracks and a total of over 1 billion plays online.

== Gameplay ==
The gameplay consists of riding a bicycle with a stick figure through a track. Almost all of the tracks in Free Rider HD are created and published by other players on the website, and it contains levels of many different difficulties. The game has a 2D level and character design, although there are more elaborate shading and depth graphics. It is displayed in high definition resolution. Rider features physics-based objects and ragdoll physics on the player.

== Trackmaking ==
The tablet and computer versions of the game allow users to create hand-drawn tracks, which they can upload to the game to be played by other players. The game currently has over 900,000+ player-made tracks. Tracks can be made by using the in-game editor, which features several tools, including a line tool, curved line tool, brush tool, and eraser. There are also powerups and vehicle powerups which can affect the player's bike in ways such as changing the rider's gravity, or boosting the rider in a certain direction. A camera tool is also provided which can be used to pan around the screen while drawing the track. Trackmaking on other mobile devices such as phones has not yet been implemented.
