= Armadillo Run =

2006 video game

- Designer: Peter Stock
- Platform: Windows
- Release: 22 April 2006
- Genre: Puzzle
- Mode: Single-player

Armadillo Run is a puzzle video game created by Peter Stock and released for Microsoft Windows in 2006. The aim of the game is to get Armadillo, a yellow basketball-like object (a stylized representation of a rolled-up armadillo) to the blue goal (a "Portal") by creating a structure using various materials that, when activated, will get Armadillo to the goal while keeping within an inconsistently strict budget. Peter Stock cites Bridge Builder and Stair Dismount for the construction and dynamic natures of the game, respectively.

== Gameplay ==
The main game has 50 "normal" levels to complete, and several bonus levels if the player has enough money to unlock them.

Every level begins with the Armadillo, the goal, various nodes and, most of the time, some pieces which cannot be moved. The larger nodes are fixed in place; these are indestructible, and are used as mounting points. The player has access to rope, metal bars, metal sheets, cloth, rubber, elastic and rockets as machine building materials. The player can also change the tension of most of the components, as well as setting a timer for some of the components to break. In some levels, certain features or materials are not available. It is up to the player to ensure the structure gets the Armadillo to the goal within the budget for that level, and holds it there for five seconds.

Each material has a cost associated with using it, and the player has a certain amount of money to use for each level. If they create a structure that gets the armadillo to the goal, but costs more money than the player has for that level, the player will fail that level. Because there is a virtually unlimited number of solutions for each level, players are encouraged to try to come up with the cheapest way possible to finish the level.

Armadillo Run also has a level editor, and encourages players to share their levels with each other through the Armadillo Run website. Players can also share their solutions to levels through the website, so that if they are truly stuck, they can see how others have completed that level and attempt to complete it with more money left in the bank.

Players can also create levels where the viewer does not need to edit anything (and sometimes cannot). These levels display ingenious ways to complete the level, with everything from simulated roller coasters to abstract car chase sequences, and show extensive use of the game's physics engine.

== Reception ==
The game has been well received by reviewers; Metacritic puts its average review score at 88%. It also earned a Gold Award from Game Tunnel, and an 88% from PC Gamer UK. It was also nominated for the 2007 Independent Games Festival for both the Seumas McNally Grand Prize and Design Innovation awards.
