= Mark Griskey =

American video game composer

Mark Griskey (born 1963) is an American composer for video games such as Marvel Heroes, Star Wars: Knights of the Old Republic II: The Sith Lords, and Star Wars: The Old Republic as well as several titles for Disney Publishing Worldwide. He was a founding member of X-Ray Dog.

== Early career ==
Griskey started his career in the early 1990s, composing music for movie trailers and TV promo commercials. In the mid-90s, he stepped into interactive media, composing for Atom Entertainment.

== LucasArts career ==
In 2001, Griskey started scoring video games for LucasArts, including Star Wars: Jedi Starfighter and Gladius. He composed some of the tracks on "The Best of LucasArts Original Soundtrack," which was named "Best Game Music Soundtrack Album of the Year" by the Game Audio Network Guild. His latest projects for the LucasArts company are Star Wars: The Force Unleashed II, which was released on 26 October 2010, and the MMORPG, Star Wars: The Old Republic, which was released on December 20, 2011.

== After LucasArts and recent projects ==
In March 2005, Griskey left LucasArts to start his freelance career with a game from Disney Interactive Studios: The Chronicles of Narnia: The Lion, the Witch and the Wardrobe. The score for Narnia was well received, and led to two additional game contracts with Disney; Pirates of the Caribbean: At World's End (2007), and The Chronicles of Narnia: Prince Caspian (2008). In addition to Griskey's work with Disney, he has also scored several other games for various publishers including: Rayman Raving Rabbids 1, 2 and TV Party; Ubisoft, Iron Man and The Incredible Hulk; Sega and Marvel Ultimate Alliance; Activision. In 2007, he composed the trailer music for Harry Potter and the Order of the Phoenix, and was also contracted to compose the score for LucasArts' title, Star Wars: The Force Unleashed, in late 2007 and later the MMO, The Old Republic.

== Awards and nominations ==
Year	Award	Work	Result
2012	Best Audio in a Casual/Indie/Social Game	Conspiracy	Nominated
2012	Music of the Year	Kinect Disneyland Adventures	Nominated
2012	Best Interactive Score	Kinect Disneyland Adventures	Won
2012	Best Original Vocal Song - Choral	"Glory, The Galactic Republic" – Star Wars: The Old Republic	Won
2012	Best Original Soundtrack Album	Star Wars: The Old Republic – Collector’s Edition Soundtrack	Won
2011	Best Use of Multi-Channel Surround in a Game	Star Wars: The Force Unleashed II	Nominated
2009	Audio of the Year	Star Wars: The Force Unleashed	Nominated
2009	Best Interactive Score	Star Wars: The Force Unleashed	Nominated
2004	Music of the Year	The Chronicles Of Narnia: The Lion The Witch and The Wardrobe	Nominated
2003	Best Original Soundtrack Album	The Best Of LucasArts Soundtracks	Won
