= Featherstone's algorithm =

Featherstone's algorithm is a technique used for computing the effects of forces applied to a structure of joints and links (an "open kinematic chain") such as a skeleton used in ragdoll physics.

The Featherstone's algorithm uses a reduced coordinate representation. This is in contrast to the more popular Lagrange multiplier method, which uses maximal coordinates. Brian Mirtich's PhD Thesis has a very clear and detailed description of the algorithm. Baraff's paper "Linear-time dynamics using Lagrange multipliers" has a discussion and comparison of both algorithms.
