= Backbreaker (video game) =

2010 video game

- Developer: NaturalMotion
- Publisher: 505 Games
- Engine: Euphoria
- Platforms: PlayStation 3; Xbox 360; iOS; Android
- Release: PS3, Xbox 360: NA: June 1, 2010; EU: June 25, 2010; iOS: NA: September 29, 2009; Android: NA: May 5, 2010
- Genre: Sports
- Modes: Single-player, multiplayer

Backbreaker is an American football video game, developed by NaturalMotion, and released on June 1, 2010 in North America and on June 25, 2010 in Europe. It uses the Euphoria game engine, that determines animations dynamically rather than depending on canned animations. The game has an extensive logo editor and team builder that was called "one of its silver linings" as the game does not have any official license for teams. NaturalMotion announced Backbreaker in August 2007, with a targeted release date of late 2008. The game ended up being delayed until mid-2010.

Backbreaker received mixed reviews. While it was praised for the Euphoria animation system, realistic physical gameplay, and the logo editor, it was criticized for its weak online play, poor passing game, and lack of depth in single-player modes. The Xbox 360 version of the game received an overall rating of 54% from review aggregator Metacritic, while the PlayStation 3 version received a 58%. The iOS and Android version was given a rating of 4.5 out of 5 stars by Touch Arcade. A patch released on August 6, 2010, and alleviated many of the issues critics had with the game upon release and included upgrades such as improved AI, new play books and an enhanced replay feature.

== Gameplay ==
Backbreaker is a simulation-style American football game, which allows the player to take control of a team of football players and compete against the CPU or another player in a variety of game modes. The game features 56 built-in teams plus seven unlockable teams, and also allows the player to create 32 additional ones for a total of 95 teams. It lacks any licensing from the National Football League, due to the fact that they were not able to negotiate a licensing agreement with the NFL or NFLPA Because of this, the developers emphasized the game's customization tools.

Creating a logo in the team creator feature. Created teams in Backbreaker can be used online, in a custom league, or in "Road to Backbreaker" mode. The team's main, helmet, and endzone logos are all fully customizable.

Backbreaker relies on the Euphoria engine, a real time animation engine developed by NaturalMotion that has been used in games such as Grand Theft Auto IV, Star Wars: The Force Unleashed, and Red Dead Redemption. This allows animations for tackles and blocking to be created on the spot instead of using a limited set of canned animations. Due to this, developers pushed to advertise that "no two tackles are the same" in an attempt to draw players to what they called a more physically realistic football game than its competitors. The physics system was rated well by the reviewers, who commented that the integration of realistic physics created a very lifelike interaction between the players on the field.

Along with the Euphoria engine, Backbreaker also features a create-a-team tool and logo creator similar to the editor found in Forza Motorsport 2. Players can create their own team or modify an existing team. Players are allowed to take their custom teams online, but are restricted from using the names of existing NFL teams and players.

=== Singleplayer ===
Backbreaker features several game modes, some that players can play quickly and others that may be played over a long period of time. In "Training Camp," new players can learn the game's controls and experienced players can practice certain skills and situations. Different tutorials for offense, defense, and special teams are included in the Training Camp. This is helpful to players, as the controls in Backbreaker are different than most current football games. In "Exhibition Mode," a player can play a single game with custom rules against either another local player or the CPU. Players can use any of the teams in the game, including ones that they have created.

Another game mode included in Backbreaker is the mini-game "Tackle Alley." In this game, the player controls a running back who starts in their own endzone. The player then attempts to score a touchdown by running up the field and evading a wave of defenders to score points. Special moves such as jukes and spins create a "combo chain," which multiply the player's score by an amount depending on the length of the combo chain. After a player scores, they advance to the next wave of defenders and must repeat the process. If a player is tackled before reaching the endzone, they must start over the wave and lose a "life." The game ends when all of the player's lives are depleted or the player passes all 100 of the waves, which become harder as the mode progresses. According to NaturalMotion, only 0.88 percent of all Backbreaker players have managed to clear all 100 levels of "Tackle Alley." Game producer Rob Donald states that the mini-game was meant to add an arcade feel to the game. "It was meant to be a complete diversion from the more realistic main game, a complete arcade challenge...Everything about it was meant to replicate the pressure and the frustration of playing a cabinet that you know is stacked against you," said Donald in an interview.

Backbreaker also features two different franchise-style modes. The first, "Season Mode", allows a player to create a custom league of either 8, 16, or 32 teams and insert custom-made and/or default teams into it. Season mode features a scouting and drafting system, but lacks trades and free agent signings. Players can play for an unlimited number of seasons, building a team through scouting college players and drafting them onto their team. The other franchise mode included is titled "Road to Backbreaker." This mode allows the player to take a custom or default team into a league structured along the lines of the English Football League including promotion and relegation. The player's team begins with a low rating in an 8-team league. By winning games, the player earns credits, which can be used to purchase the contracts of free agents. By finishing high in the 8-team league, the player's team advances to a 16-team league and eventually a 32-team league. The player improves their team by periodically signing free agents, as the competition is tougher in each league. The player wins the mode after winning a playoff tournament in the 32-team league. Afterwards, they may continue if they wish.

=== Multiplayer ===
In-game screenshot of a player playing on defense. Backbreaker uses an "on the field" camera view much closer to the player than other football video games.

Several game modes in Backbreaker can also be played as local or online multi-player over the Internet. In Exhibition mode, a second player can join the game and can play either against or with the first player. Two players may also compete against one another in Tackle Alley for the most points. Games against other players are played in splitscreen format as opposed to the usual single-camera view of other football game series. This is due to Backbreaker's "on the field" camera angle, set close to the players, making it difficult for a single-camera two-player setup. Although this setup differs from most modern football games, the developers believe it would add realism to the player's experience. "One of the benefits of having this down-on-the-field camera view is that it really makes playing as the quarterback like the passing mechanic feel really natural," said producer Rob Donald.

Players are also able to play games against other players online through the PlayStation Network and Xbox Live hosting services. Online, players are able play Quick Games and Tackle Alley, but two players can not play on the same team. Players are allowed to use their custom created teams online; others are not able to see their created logos unless they are on each other's friends lists. Otherwise, a generic "Home Team" or "Away Team" logo is displayed in place of the helmet, midfield, and endzone logos. In addition, an online leaderboard system for ranking players is included.

== Development ==
NaturalMotion officially announced Backbreaker on August 22, 2007 with the release of a short video trailer showcasing some of the aspects of the Euphoria engine. Along with this, a press release from NaturalMotion CEO Torsten Reil stated "By utilizing our motion synthesis engine, Euphoria, players will never make the same tackle twice, giving them an intensely unique experience every time they play the game." The targeted release date for the game was late 2008, according to the aforementioned press release. In mid-2008, still without any release date planned, another trailer was released for the game. This trailer revealed the Tackle Alley mini-game mode. At the 2009 Electronic Entertainment Expo, Backbreaker was showcased to the media for the first time. Along with this, a third trailer was released showing actual gameplay footage from an Exhibition game. Again, no release date was revealed.

Backbreaker was developed by the British NaturalMotion Games, Ltd. and published by 505 Games. The game's development heads were Todd Gibbs and Dave Proctor, the Senior Producer was Kevin Allington and the lead producers were Rob Donald and Matt Sherman. Development began in Summer 2007, and ended in June 2010. A game demo was released on 21 May 2010 for Xbox LIVE gold players and 28 May 2010 for silver players. When announcing the release date for the PlayStation 3 demo, the developers only commented that it would be released "soon". However, communication errors with Sony's PlayStation Network caused the demo to be delayed until June 15, 2010, two weeks after the North American release.

NaturalMotion also released a version of BackBreaker for iOS and Android mobile platforms. This version of the game, called Backbreaker Football: Tackle Alley, featured the Tackle Alley minigame found in the full game, without the Euphoria Engine and with toned-down graphics. The iOS version was released on September 29, 2009, while a version for the iPad named BackBreaker HD was released on February 4, 2010. The Android version of the game was released on May 5, 2010.

== Reception ==
Reception

Aggregate scores
Aggregator	Score
GameRankings	60.43%
Metacritic	58%

Review scores
Publication	Score
Destructoid	3.5/10
GameSpot	5.5/10
IGN	5/10
PlayStation LifeStyle.net	7/10
Techland	6/10

Mobile version reception

Review score
Publication	Score
TouchArcade	4.5/5

Backbreaker received mixed reviews from critics. While Backbreaker was praised for its realistic physics, it was also criticized for weak online play, lack of single-player gameplay depth, and poor passing play. Review aggregator Metacritic rated the game at 54% for the Xbox 360 version and 58% for the PlayStation 3 version, calling it "a fast-paced, gritty gameplay experience that's more Burnout than Madden." Backbreaker also received an aggregate score of 57.31% on GameRankings, based upon 21 different media reviews. The game's Euphoria animation system was well liked by reviewers. PlayStation LifeStyle's Joseph Peterson commented that "Realism is a major plus in Backbreaker. Running with the ball feels lifelike and better than any other football game on the market... The fact that the game really tries to make you feel what the player is feeling is probably the game's crowning achievement ... literally every tackle is completely different," while Jay Acevedo of GameFocus added, "while the game does not scream perfection, it delivers the promise of a realistic and exhilarating experience," in his review.

Although developers billed a realistic atmosphere, reviewers criticized that aspect of the game. "I understand the emphasis for this game is on the gameplay. However, a little more effort could have been made with the visuals and particularly in the audio department. Crowds will applaud your great plays and touchdowns, but the essence of a football game revolves around atmosphere. Here, it's completely lacking," said Acevedo in his review. The game was also criticized for its lack of play-by-play and poor audio. "There's no witty banter between a play-by-play announcer and color commentator (although some would argue that Madden's audio presentation's been seriously lacking the past few iterations), there's no stadium music aside from 'Boom' by P.O.D. being played during kickoffs (it gets old pretty fast), and the stadium crowds are basically an afterthought," added Doug Aamoth of Techland. After the patch, the song only comes up for the first kick-off and the kick-off of the second half.

Backbreaker's close "on the field" camera was also panned by critics. "Because the camera places you right on the field, all of the hits carry even more weight than if you were zoomed farther back, but the positive aspects are overshadowed by an inability to see the entire field," said GameSpot's review of Backbreaker, while GameZone added that "Backbreaker uses a tight third-person view that brings the player closer to the action. The results are visually interesting, but the mechanics are mismanaged. While the game strives to be as simple and as straightforward as possible, the camera often gets in the way."

The game was nominated for Best New IP at the 2010 Develop Awards, but lost to Quantic Dream's Heavy Rain.

Backbreaker's mobile editions fared well, selling over 1.5 million copies of their application. The iOS and Android versions also received positive reviews from critics. "Backbreaker is a fun mini game with cool graphics and animations," said Eli Hodapp in his review of the application. "There isn't anything overly technical about the gameplay, but it has a strangely compelling aspect to it, especially as you're high stepping to the end zone," he added.
