= Star Wars: Hunters =

2024 competitive combat arena video game

- Developers: Zynga; NaturalMotion
- Publisher: Zynga
- Composer: Gordy Haab
- Series: Star Wars
- Engine: Unreal Engine
- Platforms: Nintendo Switch; iOS; Android
- Release: June 4, 2024
- Genre: Action
- Modes: Single-player, multiplayer

Star Wars: Hunters was a free-to-play player-vs-player competitive arena combat game developed by Zynga for Nintendo Switch, iOS and Android, and released on June 4, 2024. The game takes place after the fall of the Galactic Empire, featuring a new cast of characters including bounty hunters, rebellion heroes and imperial stormtroopers. The game was shut down on October 1, 2025, due to lacking commercial viability.

== Gameplay ==
Star Wars: Hunters was a squad-based arena shooter. Set between the events of Episode VI and Episode VII, players fight in settings inspired by Star Wars locations. The game features a diverse set of characters including a Wookiee warrior, a Dark Side Force user, a bounty hunter, and an Imperial Stormtrooper.

== Development ==
On August 18, 2018, Zynga and Disney brokered a deal for a Star Wars game on mobile to be developed by Zynga and its subsidiary NaturalMotion. Star Wars: Hunters was formally announced during the Nintendo Direct presentation on February 17, 2021 with a teaser trailer with initial plans to release the game by the end of 2021. The first gameplay footage was shown off in September 2021 after during an Apple Event while showcasing the iPad Mini. A cinematic trailer was released shortly after depicting some of the characters featured in the game, including the Sith warrior, Rieve and Mandalorian, Aran Tal.

In late 2021, Star Wars: Hunters was soft-launched on Android devices in India, the Philippines, Malaysia, Taiwan, New Zealand, Australia, and Indonesia. Despite this, on July 18, 2022, Zynga announced that the official release of Star Wars: Hunters would be delayed until 2023. However, the game did not release, and on November 8, 2023, Zynga's parent company, Take-Two Interactive, announced during its quarterly earnings call that Star Wars: Hunters had been delayed to 2024.

A tech demo of Hunters was shown at Game Developers Conference 2024's State of Unreal, confirming that the game would run on an unspecified iteration of the Unreal Engine. Weeks later, Zynga announced that the game would finally launch on June 4, after multiple delays.

In November 2024, it was announced that the game would be released in early access for Microsoft Windows on January 27, 2025. In March 2025, Zynga announced the full release for Windows was cancelled and that the game would end its services for all platforms on October 1 with a final content patch on April 15.

== Reception ==
Reception

Aggregate scores
Aggregator	Score
Metacritic	NS: 57/100
OpenCritic	40% recommend

Review scores
Publication	Score
IGN	7/10
Nintendo Life	8/10
PCMag	3/5
The Guardian	3/5

Star Wars: Hunters received "mixed or average" reviews from critics, according to review aggregator Metacritic. OpenCritic determined that 40% of critics recommended the game.
