= Thomas Jakobsen =

Mathematician, cryptographer, and computer programmer

Thomas Jakobsen is a mathematician, cryptographer, and computer programmer, formerly an assistant professor at the Technical University of Denmark (DTU) and head of research and development at IO Interactive. His notable work includes designing the physics engine and 3-D pathfinder algorithms for Hitman: Codename 47, and the cryptanalysis of a number of block ciphers.

Jakobsen earned an M.Sc. in engineering and Ph.D. in mathematics, both from DTU.
