= Endorphin (software) =

3D animation software developed by Natural Motion

- Initial release: 2004
- Operating system: Windows
- Platform: x86-64
- Type: 3D animation
- Website: www.naturalmotion.com

Endorphin was a dynamic motion synthesis software package developed by NaturalMotion. It was designed to create computer simulations of a large number of independent characters interacting with each other and the environment, according to small scripts or "behaviors". It combined physics, artificial intelligence, and genetic algorithms to create realistic animations. Unlike Euphoria, also developed by NaturalMotion, Endorphin is not marketed as a graphics engine, but rather as a 3D animation tool for Microsoft Windows.

== Development ==
At the core of the software is an adaptive behavior module that assigns contextual movements to characters based on their environment. For example, soccer players can be programmed to automatically kick the ball when near another player, or a fencer can be used to attack nearby enemies. This automatic behavior generation differentiates the program from its competitors and reduces the workload of animators, who need to individually customize the behavior of each character in a large scene.

Registered users on the Naturalmotion website could obtain a free training version of Endorphin, but this version lacked the feature to export animations to popular CAD software, which is only available in the full version of the program.

== Reception ==
It was used in films and video games such as The Getaway: Black Monday (2004), Troy, Poseidon, and Tekken 5. As of 2014, Endorphin is no longer supported by NaturalMotion. The software is no longer available for purchase, and the user community has been removed from the company's website.
