= Star Wars: The Force Unleashed =

2008 video game

- Developers: LucasArts (PS3/X360); Krome Studios (PS2/PSP/Wii/NS); n-Space (DS); Universomo (iOS/J2ME/n-Gage); Aspyr (Windows/Mac OS X)
- Publisher: LucasArts (Note: iOS, J2ME and N-Gage versions published by THQ Wireless; Switch version published by Aspyr.)
- Director: Haden Blackman
- Producers: Isa Anne Stamos; Matthew J. Fillbrandt; Julio Torres; Franklin Alioto
- Designers: John Stafford; Rich Davis
- Programmer: Cédrick Collomb
- Artist: Matt Omernick
- Writers: Haden Blackman; Shawn Pitman; John Stafford; Cameron Suey
- Composer: Mark Griskey
- Engine: Ronin Engine
- Platforms: iOS; J2ME; N-Gage; Nintendo DS; PlayStation 2; PlayStation 3; PlayStation Portable; Wii; Xbox 360; Microsoft Windows; OS X; Nintendo Switch
- Release: September 16, 2008: WW: September 15, 2008 (iOS); NA: September 16, 2008; AU: September 17, 2008; EU: September 19, 2008 Microsoft Windows; NA: November 6, 2009; AU: December 16, 2009; EU: December 17, 2009 Mac OS X; NA: February 23, 2010 Nintendo Switch; WW: April 20, 2022
- Genres: Action-adventure, hack and slash
- Modes: Single-player, multiplayer (Note: Wii and handheld versions only.)

Star Wars: The Force Unleashed is a 2008 action-adventure game developed and published by LucasArts, and part of The Force Unleashed multimedia project. It was initially developed for the PS2, PS3, Wii, and Xbox 360 consoles and on iOS, second-generation N-Gage, NDS, PSP, and Java-equipped mobile phone handhelds. The game was released in North America on September 16, 2008, in Australia and Southeast Asia on September 17, and in Europe on September 19. LucasArts released downloadable content for the PS3 and Xbox 360 consoles. An Ultimate Sith Edition of the game, containing both new and previously released downloadable content, was released in November 2009, and later ported to Mac OS X and Windows. An enhanced remaster of the Wii version, developed by Aspyr, was released for the Nintendo Switch on April 20, 2022.

The project bridges the first two Star Wars trilogies, acting as an origin story for both the united Rebel Alliance and the Galactic Civil War depicted in the original trilogy. The game introduces a new protagonist named "Starkiller", a powerful Force user trained as Darth Vader's secret apprentice, who is tasked with hunting down Jedi survivors of the Great Jedi Purge while trying to keep his existence a secret. However, after he is tasked with planting the seeds of what would become the Rebel Alliance, which Vader plans to take advantage of to overthrow the Emperor, Starkiller begins to question his morality and to redeem himself slowly. Following The Walt Disney Company's acquisition of Lucasfilm in 2012, the game became part of the non-canonical Star Wars Legends continuity in 2014, and an alternative origin for the Rebel Alliance and the Galactic Civil War was given in other forms of Star Wars media, such as Star Wars Rebels and Andor.

Star Wars: The Force Unleashed received mixed reviews from critics, praising its story, voice acting, physics, art, and soundtrack, but criticizing its linear gameplay and technical issues. The game was a bestseller in the United States and Australia, with over 1,000,000 copies sold in its debut month. As of February 2010, the game had sold over 7,000,000 copies, and was the fastest-selling Star Wars video game of its time. A sequel, Star Wars: The Force Unleashed II, was released in October 2010.

== Gameplay ==
The Force Unleashed is a third-person action game in which the player's character's weapons are the Force and a lightsaber. Developers treated the main character's lightsaber like another Force power, and wanted to ensure "something visceral and cool" happened with each button-push. The game has a combo system for stringing lightsaber attacks and for combining lightsaber attacks with Force powers. Experience points earned by killing enemies and finding artifacts can be used to increase Starkiller's powers and traits. The gameplay is intended to be easy to learn; the development team included "horrible" gamers to help ensure the game's accessibility. Players can casually run and gun through the game, but the game rewards those who take a stealthy, more tactical approach. The game includes enemies that are easy to overcome; game difficulty arises from presenting these enemies in large numbers that can wear down the player's character. Additionally, enemies learn from the player's character's attacks; using the same attack on different characters can sometimes lead to the player's character doing less damage. The enemies, which number over 50, have various strengths and weaknesses; developers faced the difficulty of effectively placing them throughout the game's varied environments. Players must also carefully manage their automatically-regenerating Force energy when using exceptionally strong Force abilities, as overuse of them can drop the Force meter below zero to a negative level, incurring Force debt that disables all Force powers for a period of time until the auto-regeneration removes the debt; the more Force debt incurred, the longer the player will be without Force abilities.

=== Version differences ===
The Force Unleashed has different features across platforms. The PS3 and Xbox 360 versions, powered by the Ronin engine, utilize high-definition graphics and advanced dynamic destruction effects. These versions also support downloadable content in two expansions, expanding the game's plot. The Nintendo versions use motion controls to implement Starkiller's attacks, with the Wii version using the Wii Remote to execute lightsaber attacks and the Nunchuk to wield Force powers, while the Nintendo DS version utilizes the touchscreen to execute attacks, where single actions can be executed by tapping a certain region of the screen (with each region corresponding to a particular action, such as jumping or Force pushing), while more advanced attacks can be performed by dragging the stylus across neighboring regions of the screen.

The PS2 and PSP versions are identical in content to the Wii version, which is different than the PS3 and Xbox 360 versions. Since these versions don't support or use DLC, they exclusively intersperse certain levels with 3 of the 5 Jedi trials that Starkiller completes at the Jedi temple in Coruscant to hone his abilities, which are all included in a DLC pack for the PS3 and Xbox 360 versions. The PSP version also exclusively features five additional "historical" bonus levels that re-enact pivotal scenes and duels throughout the Star Wars saga, as well as special scenarios that can be played with as different Star Wars characters who have the same abilities in the standard single-player mode. The Nintendo DS version utilizes 3-dimensional graphics like all other major versions, but lacks voice acting.

The Wii and handheld versions support multiplayer. In the Wii version, players can duel against each other as famous Jedi and Sith of the Star Wars saga. The handheld versions utilize wireless multiplayer for a 4-player battle mode.

The Switch version is a port of the Wii version with numerous differences. It retains the motion controls from the Wii version, allowing players to use the Joy-Con controllers to perform various actions like swinging the lightsaber and using Force powers. While the graphical improvements are minor, it benefits from a stable 60 FPS performance, an improvement over some older versions with frame rate issues. This version includes the Jedi Temple missions, originally DLC on other platforms. However, some iconic moments from the Xbox 360 and PS3 versions, like bringing down a Star Destroyer with the Force, are simplified or presented as cutscenes. It includes a local multiplayer mode, a feature retained from the Wii version. In both versions, players can customize their lightsaber with different colors, hilts, and combat crystals, though some specific features from other versions, like the unstable kyber crystal, are not present.

== Plot ==
Shortly into the Galactic Empire's rule, Imperial spies locate a Jedi survivor of the Great Purge named Kento Marek on Kashyyyk. Darth Vader arrives as the planet is invaded and eliminates any Wookiee resistance between him and the fugitive Jedi. Reaching Kento's home, Vader easily defeats him in a lightsaber duel but senses someone far more powerful nearby. Initially believing it to be Kento's Jedi Master, Vader prepares to execute the defiant Jedi until his lightsaber is suddenly force-pulled from his hand by Kento's son, Galen. Sensing the boy's strong connection to the Force, Vader kills Kento and an Imperial squadron after they try to execute Galen and secretly takes him as his apprentice, with only a select few knowing of his existence.

Years later, an adult Galen (given the alias "Starkiller") completes his Sith training. He's sent by Vader to eliminate several Jedi survivors across the galaxy in preparation for assassinating the Emperor so that the duo can rule the galaxy together. Starkiller travels aboard his ship, the Rogue Shadow, alongside training droid PROXY (who is programmed to try and kill Starkiller) and Imperial pilot Juno Eclipse. Starkiller's targets include Rahm Kota, a Clone Wars veteran and leader of a militia; (Note: In the Wii, PS2, and PSP versions, after this battle, Vader sends Starkiller to the Jedi Temple on Coruscant for additional training. After fighting past Imperial forces, Starkiller endures the Jedi Trial of Skill by battling and defeating a simulation of the ancient Sith Lord, Darth Desolous.) Kazdan Paratus, insane after years of isolation on Raxus Prime; (Note: In the Wii, PS2, and PSP versions, Vader sends Starkiller back to the Jedi Temple after this battle. After fighting past Imperial forces, Starkiller endures the Jedi Trial of Insight by battling a simulation of the ancient Sith Lord, Darth Phobos. Phobos senses Starkiller's attraction to Juno Eclipse and fear of her death and exploits it by taking Juno's form, but Starkiller defeats her.) and Shaak Ti, who's hiding on Felucia. Two of these three Jedi masters, Kota and Ti, inform Starkiller that they have foreseen that soon Vader will no longer be his master before he finishes them (with Ti committing suicide instead). After the latter's death, Starkiller returns to Vader again, but the Emperor arrives, his spies having uncovered Starkiller's existence. To prove his loyalty to the Emperor, Vader appears to kill his apprentice by stabbing him and hurling him through space.

Unbeknownst to the Emperor, Vader has Starkiller recovered and resuscitated. Vader sends Starkiller to foster a rebellion among the Empire's enemies, hoping to distract the Emperor's spies for Vader to overthrow him. Starkiller rescues Juno, arrested and branded a traitor to the Empire, and escapes with her and PROXY. Looking for allies to aid his mission, Starkiller finds an alive Kota on Cloud City, rendered blind from Starkiller's earlier victory over him and reduced to alcoholism, and rescues him from Imperial forces.

The group travels to Kashyyyk to locate Kota's contact, senator Bail Organa. Starkiller discovers his old home and meets his father's spirit, who expresses remorse for Starkiller's upbringing under Vader. (Note: In the Wii, PS2, and PSP versions, Starkiller meets and rescues Kota on Nar Shaddaa, then before going to Kashyyyk, returns to the Jedi Temple and endures the Jedi Trial of the Spirit by battling a simulation of his father, Kento Marek. Here, Starkiller meets his father and discovers his true identity, replacing the sequence of him visiting his old home.) To gain Bail's trust, Starkiller rescues his captive daughter Princess Leia Organa, and liberates the enslaved Wookiees at her request. Starkiller learns from Kota that Bail went missing on Felucia, after searching for Shaak Ti in the hope that she would rescue Leia. Starkiller travels to Felucia to find Bail, discovering that he'd been captured by Shaak Ti's former apprentice Maris Brood, who succumbed to the Dark Side after her master's death. Starkiller defeats Brood but spares her life, and convinces Bail to join the rebellion.

To convince more dissidents to do the same, Vader suggests that Starkiller attack a Star Destroyer facility on Raxus Prime to show that the Empire is vulnerable. Juno learns Starkiller is still serving Vader and chastises him, but agrees to keep silent. On Raxus Prime, Starkiller is attacked by PROXY, who attempts to fulfill his programming by killing him. Still, Starkiller defeats him, destroys the facility, and pulls a falling Star Destroyer out of the sky using the Force. (Note: In the Wii, PS2, and PSP versions, the battle against PROXY is replaced with a battle against an Emperor's Shadow Guard. After this, Starkiller travels to Cloud City to rescue Garm Bel Iblis, kidnapped by the criminal Chop'aa Notimo and his enforcer, Kleef.) Bail meets with fellow senators Mon Mothma and Garm Bel Iblis on Corellia to formally organize a rebellion, only for Vader to arrive and arrest them and Kota. After overpowering Starkiller, Vader reveals that he was merely a tool to lure out the Empire's enemies, and had never intended to use him to overthrow the Emperor. Starkiller escapes after PROXY sacrifices himself by attacking Vader.

Juno rescues Starkiller, who uses the Force to see that Kota and the senators are being held on the Death Star. After Juno kisses him and he bids farewell, Starkiller battles his way through the station to reach the Emperor's throne room. Vader confronts him, but Starkiller defeats his former master and faces the Emperor, who tries to goad him into killing Vader so Starkiller can take his place. Kota tries to attack the Emperor, but is subdued with Force lightning. At this point, the player must choose between saving Kota (Light Side) or killing Vader (Dark Side).

- If the player chooses the Light Side, Starkiller defeats the Emperor, but spares him at Kota's urging. The Emperor unleashes Force lightning at Kota, but Starkiller absorbs it, sacrificing himself to allow Kota and the senators to escape on the Rogue Shadow. The Emperor and Vader become concerned that Starkiller has become a martyr to inspire the newly-formed Rebel Alliance. On Kashyyyk, the senators proceed with the rebellion and Leia chooses Starkiller's family crest as their symbol. Kota tells Juno that among Starkiller's dark thoughts, Juno herself was one bright spot that he held onto right until his death.
- If the player chooses the Dark Side, Starkiller kills Vader and is congratulated by the Emperor, who commands him to kill Kota to sever his ties to the Jedi and become a Sith Lord. Starkiller instead attacks the Emperor, who foils his attempt and then crushes him with the Rogue Shadow, severely injuring Starkiller and killing Juno, Kota, and the senators. Starkiller later awakens to find his body being grafted with armor to continue serving the Emperor, though he assures Starkiller that he'll be replaced once he finds a new apprentice just as Vader before him.

=== Downloadable content ===
Three DLC levels for the game were released for the PS3, Xbox 360, and computer versions of the game. The first one is set during the events of the main story and explores more of Starkiller's background, while the second and third ones expand upon the non-canonical Dark Side ending of the game, taking place in their own alternate timeline. All three DLC packs are included on-disc in the Ultimate Sith Edition for all abovementioned three platforms.

The Coruscant DLC depicts Starkiller, at some point before traveling to Kashyyyk, deciding to visit the abandoned Jedi Temple to learn more about his identity and connection to the Force. After fighting his way past the Imperial security forces, he reaches the old Council Chambers, where he meets Kento Marek's spirit who tells him that he needs to pass three Jedi trials. Upon doing so, Starkiller is faced with a mysterious Sith warrior, revealed to be a dark reflection of himself created by his own fear. Following his defeat, Starkiller finds a holocron left by Marek, who reveals himself as his father and implores him to return to the light side. Starkiller then returns to the Rogue Shadow to resume his current mission.

The Tatooine and Hoth DLC's are set during alternate depictions of A New Hope and The Empire Strikes Back, respectively, and present Starkiller as the Emperor's trusted assassin, referred to as "Lord Starkiller".

In the Tatooine DLC, he's tasked with retrieving the Death Star plans stolen by the Rebel Alliance, which have been tracked to Tatooine. He visits Jabba the Hutt, who has knowledge on the plans' whereabouts, revealing that they're in the possession of two droids at Mos Eisley. When Starkiller refuses to work for him, Jabba attempts to have Starkiller eaten by his rancor. Killing the beast, Starkiller escapes from Jabba's palace after massacring Jabba's mercenaries, including Boba Fett. At Mos Eisley, Starkiller kills Jedi Master Obi-Wan Kenobi after a duel which allows the droids to board the Millennium Falcon, though Starkiller manages to place a tracking device on the ship before it takes off.

In the Hoth DLC, Starkiller partakes in the Battle of Hoth, where the Empire attacks the weakened Rebel Alliance base. During the battle, Starkiller infiltrates the base with orders to capture Luke Skywalker, who had begun training as a Jedi. Starkiller finds and defeats Skywalker in the base's hangar, severing his right hand. When the Falcon tries to take off, Starkiller seizes the ship with the Force while goading Skywalker to give into the Dark Side to rescue his friends. Skywalker attacks Starkiller with Force lightning, causing him to let go of the ship and congratulate Skywalker for embracing the Dark Side, planning to make him his apprentice the same way that Vader did to him.

== Cast and characters ==
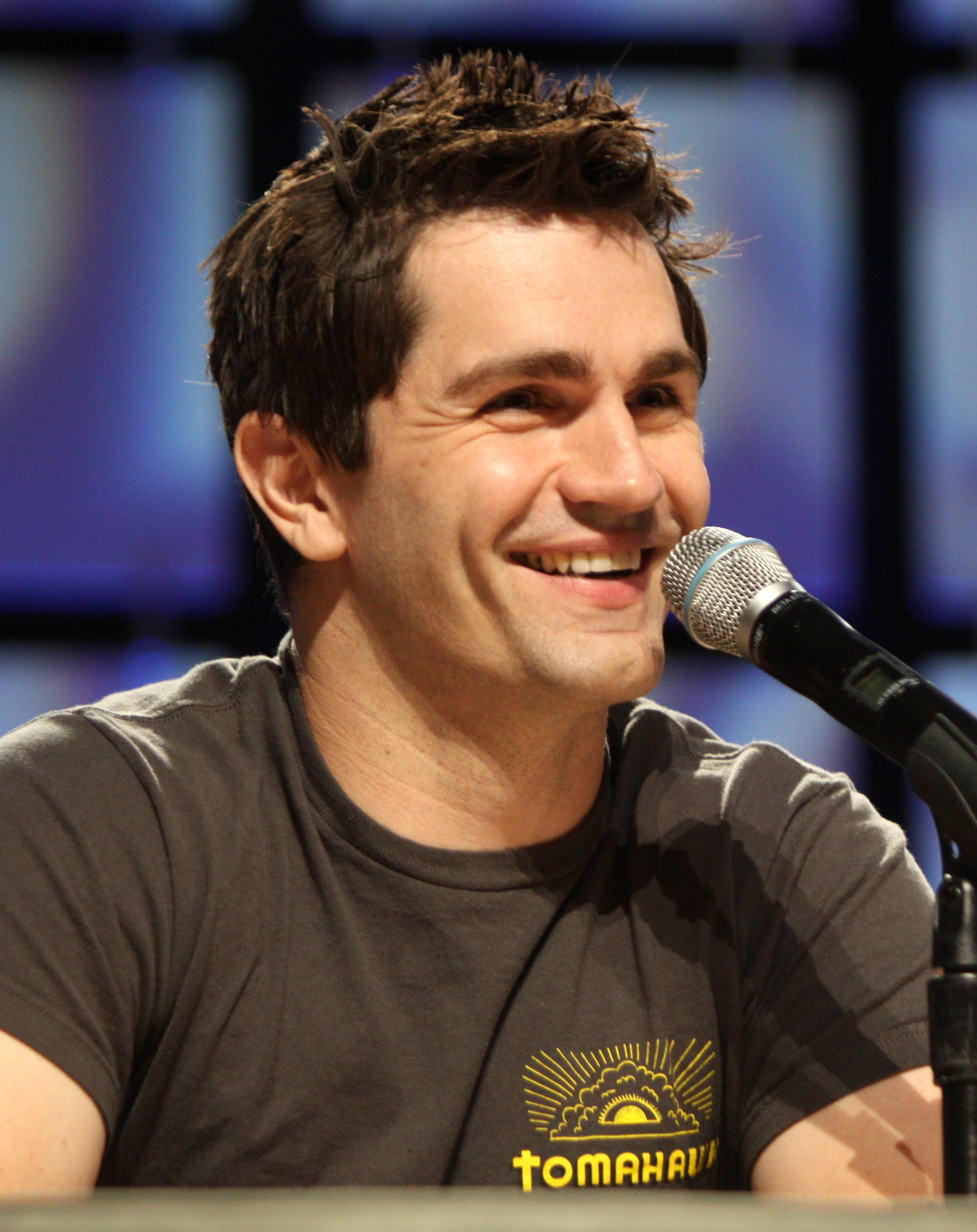
Sam Witwer provides Starkiller's voice and likeness.

- Sam Witwer as Galen Marek / Starkiller — The forbidden child of a Jedi, Starkiller was adopted by his father's killer, Darth Vader, who, aware of his strong connection to the Force, raised him to be his secret apprentice. Once his training is complete, Starkiller is dispatched by his master to kill several prominent Jedi who survived the Great Jedi Purge. Although initially acting as a villain, Starkiller is "really just [a] damaged kid." Developers decided not to give Starkiller a name in the game, but the novelization reveals his real name as "Galen Marek". Although Starkiller starts as Vader's apprentice, a focus of the game is to allow the character to evolve into "something more heroic, something greater." Audio director David Collins saw a resemblance between Starkiller concept art and his friend, Witwer; Collins asked for Witwer's headshot and an audition reel, and a few weeks later Witwer sat for a 45-minute audition. Witwer secured the role by demonstrating to developers his deep understanding of the character; in portraying Starkiller, Witwer brought many new ideas about the character and imbued him with a sense of humanity. Developers tried not to make Starkiller so evil that players would have difficulty connecting to him, aiming to strike a balance between loyalty to his master and his growing sense of disillusionment with the Empire. The character's name is an homage to "Anakin Starkiller," the original name of the character that eventually became Luke Skywalker. Witwer also voiced Emperor Palpatine. Some fans believe that Starkiller has also made an appearance in Season 2 of Ahsoka as the character Marrok since Witwer confirmed he would make an appearance in the show.
- Matt Sloan as Darth Vader — A powerful Dark Lord of the Sith, high-ranking enforcer of the Empire, and Starkiller's master, who discovers Starkiller as a child and trains him. In training Starkiller by having him hunt the few remaining Jedi survivors, Vader intends to prepare him to overthrow the Emperor, although there are "twists and turns" in this scheme. The events depicted in The Force Unleashed are pivotal to Darth Vader's history and development, depicting him as being largely responsible for the events leading to the Galactic Civil War, depicted in the original Star Wars trilogy.
- Nathalie Cox as Juno Eclipse — Rogue Shadow’s pilot and Starkiller's love interest. Eclipse was not originally part of the game; early concepts had the apprentice as an older character who develops a connection with a young Princess Leia. Star Wars creator George Lucas, uncomfortable with this idea, encouraged the developers to create a love interest. The apprentice, who has had limited interaction with women when the game begins, does not at first know how to act around her. Her introduction early in the game allows the relationship with Starkiller to develop, and her inclusion helps "recapture that rich ensemble feel of the original Star Wars". According to Sean Williams, who wrote the novelization, the romantic storyline is the key to The Force Unleashed. The name "Juno Eclipse" was originally proposed as a name for the character eventually called "Asajj Ventress" — it was ultimately rejected as insufficiently villainous. The Force Unleashed project lead Haden Blackman brought the name back for the mythic quality of the name "Juno" and the duality suggested by an "eclipse." Cox, in addition to strongly resembling the character's concept art, had "integrity and poise" appropriate to Juno Eclipse that helped the actor secure the role.
- Adrienne Wilkinson as Maris Brood — A Zabrak survivor of the Jedi Purge and Shaak Ti's apprentice. After her master's death at Starkiller's hands, Brood falls to the dark side and uses Felucia's inhabitants to wage war on the Imperial forces trying to occupy the planet. The character was originally conceived as a pirate captain, and Christianson's early art included Brood's distinctive lightsaber tonfas. Wilkinson brought strength to her performance, leading to an expansion of the role with more dialogue.
- David W. Collins as PROXY — Starkiller's droid sidekick, designed to constantly test his lightsaber and Force abilities, as well as deliver important messages through holographic projection. Collins said PROXY has C-3PO's innocence but also is "really dangerous." The companion trade paperback describes the conflict between PROXY's primary programming to kill Starkiller and its self-imposed desire to help him; PROXY is eager to please Starkiller, but does not know how dangerous it can be or that there is a conflict between its programming and Starkiller's wishes. Trying to avoid having PROXY's dialogue become too reminiscent of either C-3PO or the villainous HK-47 of Knights of the Old Republic, developers focused on PROXY's friendly naïvety.
- Jimmy Smits as Bail Organa — Smits voices the character he played in the prequels trilogy: a Galactic Senator from Alderaan and Princess Leia's adoptive father who becomes a founding member of the Rebel Alliance.
- Tom Kane as Kento Marek / Captain Ozzik Sturn
- Larry Drake as Kazdan Paratus
- Susan Eisenberg as Shaak Ti
- Catherine Taber as Princess Leia Organa
- David W. Collins as Jabba the Hutt
- Dee Bradley Baker as Boba Fett
- Rob Rackstraw as Obi-Wan Kenobi
- Lloyd Floyd as Luke Skywalker
- Cully Fredricksen as General Rahm Kota

== Development ==
=== Concept ===
The first visualization of "the Force unleashed" was in this concept art by Greg Knight, which shows a stormtrooper being "Force-pushed".

Game planning began in summer 2004. Initially, about six developers started with a "clean slate" to conceptualize a new Star Wars game; the small group of engineers, artists, and designers spent more than a year brainstorming ideas for what might make a good game. Over 100 initial concepts were whittled down to 20 to 25 that included making the game the third entry in the Knights of the Old Republic series or having the protagonist be a Wookiee "superhero", Darth Maul, a bounty hunter, a smuggler, a mercenary or the last member of the Skywalker family living 500 years after the events of Return of the Jedi. The decision to focus on the largely unexplored period between Revenge of the Sith and A New Hope helped energize the design team. Consumer feedback helped the developers narrow in on seven concepts, and elements from those seven went into The Force Unleashed's overall concept.

Production was greatly aided by concept art, which was intended to bridge the two Star Wars trilogies visually, convey the impression of a "lived-in" universe, show how the galaxy changes under Imperial rule, and to seem familiar yet new. An off-hand comment about the Force in the game being powerful enough "to pull a Star Destroyer out of the sky" inspired an image by senior concept artist Amy Beth Christenson that became an important part of the developers' idea pitches and evolved into a major moment in the game. These illustrations also inspired the creation of dozens of simple, three-dimensional animations. Eventually, a one-minute previsualization video highlighting the idea of "kicking someone's ass with the Force" helped convince the designers that The Force Unleashed would be "a great game"; George Lucas, upon seeing the one-minute video, told the designers to "go make that game". Once the concept was solidified, the development team grew from ten to twenty people. The idea of "reimagining" the Force as "amped up" in The Force Unleashed aligned with LucasArts' overall goal of harnessing the power of the latest video game consoles to "dramatically" change gaming, specifically through the use of simulation-based gameplay.

=== Story ===
In April 2005, after several months of planning, the LucasArts team received Lucas' encouragement to create a game centered on Darth Vader's secret apprentice in the largely unexplored period between Revenge of the Sith and A New Hope, drawing the two trilogies together. LucasArts spent six months developing the story. Lucas spent hours discussing with the developers the relationship between Darth Vader and Emperor Palpatine and provided feedback on what Vader would want out of and how he would motivate an apprentice. Lucas Licensing reviewed many game details to ensure they fit into canon. Focus group feedback indicated that, while hunting down Jedi at Vader's order would be fun, the character should be redeemed, in keeping with a major Star Wars motif. Before the game's release, Lucasfilm claimed it would "unveil new revelations about the Star Wars galaxy" with a "redemption" motif. The story progresses through a combination of scripted events, in-game cinematics, cutscenes, and dialogue.

Looking over many unexplored already existing characters, the creative team considered bringing Darth Plagueis, Emperor Palpatine's enigmatic master only mentioned in Revenge of the Sith, into the game's story through various methods: one was for Plagueis' spirit to serve as the guide for Vader's secret apprentice to provide players with information about their character's powers, another had Plagueis as the story's MacGuffin by having Vader send his apprentice to search for Plagueis to resurrect his beloved Padmé Amidala, making Vader's apprentice actually a reincarnated Plagueis or having a redeemed Plagueis become the apprentice's mentor. Knight and the developers explored different possible looks for Plagueis, depicting him as a human resembling actor Michael Gambon, a zombie, a time traveler, a cyborg, etc. Although the game introduces new characters, developers felt the presence of characters already part of Star Wars would help anchor the game within the official continuity.

=== Technology ===
A Euphoria-coded soldier grasps a Havok-coded crate before both are flung through a Digital Molecular Matter-coded display.

During pre-production, about 30 people were on the project team. LucasArts spent several years developing the tools and technology to create The Force Unleashed. Prototyping, level construction, marketing, and public relations took about a year. Until late 2006, the production team was ascertaining "how many polygons, lights, [and] characters" next-generation platforms supported; a year of full production began in early 2007. A series of quickly-produced "play blast" videos helped the developers focus on mechanics, the user interface, and finishing moves. Development of the Xbox 360 version came first; PlayStation 3 development started when the production team had enough development kits. Making the game run on both the PlayStation 3 and Xbox 360 was "a monumental task".

The game is based on LucasArts' proprietary "Ronin" game engine but also integrates third-party technology: Havok for rigid body physics, Pixelux Entertainment's "Digital Molecular Matter" (DMM) for dynamically destructible objects, and NaturalMotion's Euphoria for realistic non-player character artificial intelligence. The focus of employing Euphoria to develop The Force Unleashed caused LucasArts to "sideline" Indiana Jones and the Staff of Kings, an Indiana Jones title that had been in development since two years ago, for a while until development on the Star Wars title concluded. LucasArts' programmers had to overcome technical hurdles to get Havok-, DMM- and Euphoria-coded components to interact. Developers also had to strike a balance between realistic and entertaining physics. LucasArts initially opted not to release a personal computer version of The Force Unleashed, stating that doing the game well would be too processor-intensive for typical PCs and that scaling down the game's procedural physics for the PC platform would "fundamentally" change The Force Unleashed's gameplay. However, LucasArts later announced Windows and Mac versions of the game, developed in conjunction with Aspyr Media, for release in Fall 2009.

Lacking Havok, Euphoria, and DMM, Krome's Wii version relies on the company's in-house physics engine. Some character animations may be ragdoll while others are preset; in developing the game, Krome tried to blur the distinction between the two. The lighting system in the Wii version is more advanced than that in the PS2 version, which Krome also built; the PS2 includes more graphic details than the PSP version.

=== ILM collaboration and cast performance ===
The Force Unleashed is intended to make players think they are "actually, finally, in a Star Wars movie". It is the first game on which LucasArts and Industrial Light & Magic (ILM) collaborated since they both relocated to the Letterman Digital Arts Center in San Francisco, California. This collaboration allowed the companies to co-develop tools to make film-quality effects. LucasArts worked with ILM's Zeno tool framework and helped ILM build its Zed game editor. Lucas said having the two companies working together in the same building was "a great collaboration".

It took Senior Manager of Voice and Audio Darragh O'Farrell four months to cast The Force Unleashed. ILM's face- and motion-capture "CloneCam" technology recorded actors' voice and physical performances. This led to a change in LucasArts' casting process: for the first time, actors needed to match characters' age and gender. Actors performed their lines together, rather than in isolation, to better understand their characters' interaction. Consequently, the script's dialogue was reduced while reliance on characters' expressions — captured through the CloneCam — increased. CloneCam technology had previously been used in producing the Pirates of the Caribbean movies.

=== Music ===
LucasArts music supervisor Jesse Harlin said the music matches the game's motif of redemption and goal of bridging the gap between Revenge of the Sith and A New Hope:

We had to make sure that the game's score started off rooted within the Prequel Trilogy feel of ethnic percussion and sweeping themes that spoke to the nobility and grandeur of the old Jedi Order. As the game progresses, however, the Empire gains more control, the Jedi are hunted, and the ordered control of the Prequels gives way to the more romantic temperament of the Original Trilogy.

The game's soundtrack includes material composed by John Williams for the films in addition to material created specifically for The Force Unleashed. Jesse Harlin composed the game's main theme, while Mark Griskey composed the score. Griskey made use of several motifs from the film scores as well as Harlin's main theme. The 90-minute soundtrack was recorded by the Skywalker Symphony Orchestra and mixed at Skywalker Sound in Lucas Valley in September and October 2007. During gameplay, a proprietary engine combines "musical elements according to the pace, plot, and environment of the game at any given moment", resulting in a unique musical experience. A promotional soundtrack album was made available online through Tracksounds.com in 2008.

== Other media ==
=== Print works ===
Sean Williams' novelization was released in the United States on August 19, 2008. It spent one week as #1 on both Publishers Weekly's and The New York Times' hardcover fiction bestsellers lists, slipping to #7 and #9, respectively, the following week. It also reached #15 on USA Today's bestsellers list.

Williams took on the writing project in part because of the "catchy description" of The Force Unleashed being "Episode 3.5" of the Star Wars saga. The novel focuses on the dark side of the Force and its practitioners; Williams found it "interesting" to portray the Jedi as "bad guys." The author most enjoyed developing the character of Juno Eclipse, exploring the "feminine" side of The Force Unleashed in a way the video game does not. Williams also said that while the game allows the player to "do" Starkiller's actions, the novel allows readers to experience Starkiller's thoughts about those actions, adding another dimension to the story.

Dark Horse's The Force Unleashed graphic novel was published August 18, 2008. Newsarama called the graphic novel a "solid story" that matches the video game source material in both structure and plot. IGN gave the graphic novel a score of 6.9/10 (6.4/10 for art, 7.5/10 for the writing), praising the overall story but faulting inconsistency in the art and questioning whether the comic medium was the best way to convey the story.

=== Merchandise ===
At Toy Fair 2007, Hasbro showed seven figures from their action figure line based on the game. Lego released a model of the Starkiller's ship, the Rogue Shadow.

=== Expansion ===
Two weeks after the game's release, LucasArts announced development on two downloadable expansion packs for the game's PS3 and Xbox 360 versions. The first expansion added "skins" that allow the player's character to appear as Star Wars figures other than Starkiller, such as Obi-Wan Kenobi, Anakin Skywalker, Qui-Gon Jinn, Jango Fett, C-3PO, Luke Skywalker, Darth Maul, Darth Sion, Mace Windu, Plo Koon, Kit Fisto and Ki-Adi-Mundi. The skins chosen to be part of the expansion were based in part on fans' feedback, and many skins of such prior Star Wars characters were also implemented as cheat codes for the Wii, PlayStation 2 and PlayStation Portable versions of the game with no additional downloads required. The second expansion pack added a new mission expanding Starkiller's background. Although a moment in the game's main story was considered as a "jumping off point" for the expansion, LucasArts decided instead to make the new mission instantly accessible to players. The mission's location — the Jedi Temple on Coruscant — appears in the Wii, PlayStation 2 and PlayStation Portable versions of The Force Unleashed, but was cut during planning from the PS3 and Xbox 360 platforms.

The Tatooine Downloadable Content, released August 27, 2009, is the first of two expansions that occur in an "Infinities" storyline, an alternate history in which Starkiller kills Vader and becomes Palpatine's assassin. The second Infinities expansion, which takes place on Hoth, was originally only available as part of the Ultimate Sith Edition, which also includes all previous downloadable content. However, the Hoth expansion was later made available for download on the PlayStation Network and Xbox Live.

== Reception ==
Reception

Aggregate scores
Aggregator	Score							
Aggregator	DS	NS	PC	PS2	PS3	PSP	Wii	Xbox 360
GameRankings	60%			69%	72%	69%	74%	73%
Metacritic	61/100	65/100	65/100	68/100	71/100	70/100	71/100	73/100

Review scores
Publication	Score							
Publication	DS	NS	PC	PS2	PS3	PSP	Wii	Xbox 360
1Up.com	B				C	C−	C	C
Electronic Gaming Monthly					C, C, B−			C, C, B−
Game Informer					8.75/10			8.75/10
GameSpot	5.5/10		5.0/10	6.0/10	7.5/10	7.0/10	6.0/10	7.5/10
IGN	7.0/10		7.5/10	7.2/10	7.3/10	7.5/10	7.8/10	7.3/10
Official Nintendo Magazine							82%	
Official Xbox Magazine (US)								7.5/10
X-Play					2/5			2/5

Award
Publication	Award
GameSpot	Best Use of a Creative License

1.738 million unit sales of The Force Unleashed across all platforms made it the third best-selling game globally in the third quarter of 2008; as of July 2009, it had sold six million copies. The Force Unleashed was both the fastest-selling Star Wars game and LucasArts' fastest-selling game. The Force Unleashed won a Writers Guild of America award for Best Video Game Writing. During the 12th Annual Interactive Achievement Awards, the Academy of Interactive Arts & Sciences awarded The Force Unleashed with "Outstanding Achievement in Adapted Story".

=== PlayStation 3, Xbox 360 and PC ===
The Force Unleashed received mixed reviews. Electronic Gaming Monthly said the game is "ambitious--yet dissatisfying"; however, GameSpot said the game "gets more right than it does wrong". GameSpot said the PC port of the game retained all of the game's strengths and weaknesses, but that the port failed to take advantage of the PC platform.

GameSpot called the game's story "more intimate and more powerful" than the Star Wars franchise's prequel trilogy; X-Play identified the game's story as one of the game's "few bright spots" and said the game's visuals successfully convey Star Wars' "classic used universe" feel. GamePro and GameSpot praised the game's art and physics, and GamePro also commended Starkiller's "cool powers". IGN praised the game's voice acting, particularly Witwer's performance as Starkiller. The Washington Times identified Mark Griskey's soundtrack as "another star" of the game, and Tracksounds called it "the most entertaining Star Wars score since Return of the Jedi". Time called The Force Unleashed the seventh best video game of 2008. The game received GameSpot's 2008 award for Best Use of a Creative License and was nominated for Best Voice Acting. Gaming Target selected the game as one of their "40 Games We'll Still Be Playing From 2008".

Conversely, Entertainment Weekly called The Force Unleashed the second-worst game of 2008 and GameTrailers called it the most disappointing game that year; it was also a nominee for GameSpot's Most Disappointing Game recognition. Official Xbox Magazine cited the game's linear gameplay and lack of multiplayer as reasons the game falls short of being "an all-engrossing Star Wars experience". GamesTM suggested that allowing players to take a hack-and-slash approach means many "will never view the title's full potential". IGN and X-Play criticized some boss battles and enemies' behavior; GamePro also faulted "disappointing" boss battles and the game's "uneven" combat. Rather than feeling more powerful as the game progresses, GamePro felt that increases in Starkiller's powers were dampened by increasingly difficult enemy abilities and positions; X-Play commented that despite a good level-up system, Starkiller and his enemies are "pretty much on even ground most of the time". Wired, X-Play, and GameSpot criticized the game's third-person camera and the sequence that requires the player to make Starkiller pull a Star Destroyer out of the sky. Wired.com speculated that LucasArts could have recognized the frustration of the Star Destroyer sequence and removed it, but left it in because they hyped the sequence before the game's release. Wired.com and GameSpot further criticized the load times and abrupt gameplay-cinematic transitions. GameSpot also faulted "loose" targeting and some visual and audio glitches. IGN, which also identified problems with targeting, speculated that DMM's processor intensiveness limited its use throughout the game, detracting from players' ability to feel immersed. GameTrailers and IGN were disappointed with the lack of variety within and between levels. X-Play, pointing to "Default Text" as the bonus objective description in the Xbox 360 version's final mission and other glitches, said it seems the developers one day "just stopped working on the game". GameSpot cited the port's lack of visual options and poor framerate as evidence the PC edition had been rushed.

IGN described the Jedi Academy expansion as "pretty decent". GameSpot said LucasArts seems to have acknowledged some of the game's criticisms in developing the Tatooine expansion, but IGN called the level's boss fights "a joke" in light of the player's high Force powers. IGN found the level design in The Ultimate Sith Edition's Hoth scenario uninteresting, and called the boss fight against Luke Skywalker tough but "not nearly as fun" as it could have been.

The demo was the fourth most-played Xbox Live game during the week of August 25, trailing Grand Theft Auto IV, Halo 3, and Call of Duty 4: Modern Warfare; it was the ninth most-played Xbox Live title throughout all of 2008. The week it was released, The Force Unleashed was the sixth most-played game on Xbox Live, and it rose to fifth the following week. In its first week on sale in Australia, the PS3 and Xbox 360 versions of The Force Unleashed were the top and second-best sellers, respectively. In the United States, the PlayStation 3 and Xbox 360 version sold 325,000 and 610,000 copies, respectively, in September 2008; that month, the Xbox 360 version was the best-selling game and the PlayStation 3 version was the fifth best-selling game for their respective consoles.

=== Other platforms ===
Nintendo Power praised the story and the number of lightsaber combos but criticized the game's easiness and hack-and-slash gameplay. It also praised the Wii version for its story and Force powers, but criticized the game's lightsaber controls and linear gameplay. GameSpot noticed visual glitches and problematic audio compression that detracted from the Wii version's "mature and exciting" story, adding that the reduced number of Force-manipulable objects helps mitigate the targeting problems experienced on other platforms. Referring to the Wii remote and nunchuck controls, GameSpot also speculated that The Force Unleashed is "possibly the most waggle-heavy" Wii game. Zero Punctuation criticized the Wii version's graphics and compared lightsaber combat to "trying to follow an aerobics routine with both your arms tied to different windmills". The ability to upgrade Starkiller's abilities in the PS2 version, according to IGN, is not as "robust" as it should be, and the game's targeting system is sometimes frustrating. IGN said the PS2's real-time cutscene rendering made Starkiller seem emotionless, and that pre-rendered cutscenes would have been better. GameSpot found the DS version's plot interesting but the storytelling itself "lackluster". While the DS version is easy, with Starkiller killing enemies "like a hot knife through butter", GameSpot said the player's sense of power is not matched by a sense of freedom. GameSpot called the PSP version's camera "unwieldy", but added that smaller and less cluttered environments make the targeting system less frustrating than on other platforms. The Wii version was a nominee for multiple Wii-specific awards from IGN in its 2008 video game awards, including Best Story and Best Voice Acting.

In the week of its release, the Wii version was the sixth bestselling game in Australia and was second to Wii Fit among games for that platform. The PS2 version was the eighth bestseller in Australia, and both the PS2 and PSP versions were the top sellers on their respective platforms. The DS version was eighth most sold among DS games in Australia. In the United States, the Wii version sold 223,000 copies in September 2008, making it the ninth best-selling game that month. In the United States, the PlayStation 2 version was the 14th best-selling game in September 2008, selling over 100,000 copies.
