= NaturalMotion =

British video game developer

NaturalMotion Ltd.
- Type: Subsidiary
- Industry: Video games
- Founded: 2001; 25 years ago in Oxford, United Kingdom
- Headquarters: London
- Owner: Take-Two Interactive
- Parent: Zynga
- Subsidiaries: BossAlien
- Website: www.naturalmotion.com

NaturalMotion Limited is a British video game development company with development offices in London, Brighton and Birmingham. Founded in November 2001 as a spin-out company from the University of Oxford by Torsten Reil, Michael Buckland, and Tariq Iqbal, NaturalMotion specialises in creating animation technology for the video game and film industries. In January 2014, NaturalMotion was acquired by Zynga for US$527 million.

Their main technology products are Endorphin (for the film industry) and Euphoria (for the gaming industry), in addition to video games such as Backbreaker and CSR Racing.

== Technology ==
NaturalMotion commercialized their procedural animation technology, which they call Dynamic Motion Synthesis (DMS). DMS is based on a real-time simulation of biomechanics and the motor control nervous system. As such, it has roots in biology and robot control theory. NaturalMotion states that DMS allows for fully interactive 3D characters, as it is not based on canned animation. DMS is used in two of the company's products: Endorphin, a 'tool for creating virtual stuntmen' and Euphoria, a runtime engine. The first commercially released title to use Euphoria was Grand Theft Auto IV by Rockstar Games.

NaturalMotion's other middleware product is Morpheme - an animation engine for Wii U, PlayStation 3, Xbox 360, PC, PlayStation Vita, Android, and iOS. Unlike the company's other packages, Morpheme does not use DMS and instead provides tools for blending animations, inverse kinematics and rigid-body simulation. Some of the games that use Morpheme include BioShock Infinite, Enslaved: Odyssey to the West, Eve Online, Horizon Zero Dawn, and Pure.

== Customers ==
NaturalMotion's technology is in use at many film and games companies, including Sony, The Mill, Electronic Arts, Moving Picture Company, Konami, Capcom, Sega and many more. Movies and games featuring Endorphin animation include Troy, Poseidon, The Getaway, Tekken 5 and Metal Gear Solid.

In 2006, LucasArts announced that it would use the Euphoria animation engine in Indiana Jones and the Staff of Kings and Star Wars: The Force Unleashed games. In 2007, Rockstar Games announced it had licensed this engine for many of their new and upcoming games, with the first announced title being Grand Theft Auto IV. Subsequent Rockstar Games titles that use the engine include Red Dead Redemption, Max Payne 3, Grand Theft Auto V and Red Dead Redemption 2.

== NaturalMotion Games ==
In 2009, NaturalMotion released its first game, the iPhone title Backbreaker Football, which used Morpheme to simulate movement and tackles. The game was a critical and commercial success, with a Quality Index score of 8.1/10 and 5 million downloads.

The company created a new division, NaturalMotion Games, on 18 November 2010. In 2011, NaturalMotion Games released its first free-to-play title My Horse on iPhone and iPad. It has been downloaded over 11 million times. Its second F2P game, CSR Racing, reached number one in Top Grossing and Top Free App Store charts across the world. The game made over $12 million in its first month. In August 2012, NaturalMotion announced that it had acquired the studio, BossAlien, for an undisclosed sum.

NaturalMotion's CEO Torsten Reil announced a new 'interactive toy' called Clumsy Ninja on stage during the Apple iPhone 5 announcement. It is the first mobile title to use the Euphoria animation engine. The game was originally announced for 'holiday season' 2012, however it was delayed by almost a year. It eventually appeared worldwide on the App Store on 21 November 2013. On release, Clumsy Ninja became the first Application to be promoted with a video trailer embedded in the Application Store.

In October 2017, Zynga closed NaturalMotion's Oxford office.

== Games developed ==
Game	Release	Format
Backbreaker	2010	iOS, Android, Xbox 360, PlayStation 3
Backbreaker 2: Vengeance	2010	iOS, Android
Jenga	2011	iOS, Android, OS X
NFL Rivals	2011	iOS
Icebreaker Hockey	2011	iOS, Android
Backbreaker: Vengeance	2011	XBLA, PSN
My Horse	2011	iOS, Android
CSR Racing	2012	iOS, OS X, Android, Windows
CSR Classics	2013	iOS, Android
Clumsy Ninja	2013	iOS, Android
CSR Racing 2	2016	iOS, Android
Dawn of Titans	2016	iOS, Android
Star Wars: Hunters	2024	iOS, Android, Nintendo Switch
