= TAAt =

Finnish demogroup

tAAt (short for tArzAn tuotanto, Finnish for tArzAn productions) is a Finnish humor-based demogroup founded in 1992 which is active in participating and organizing demoscene events. They are recognized outside of the demoscene for their Dismount series of computer games, including Stair Dismount (Porrasturvat), Truck Dismount (Rekkaturvat) and Dismount Levels. They are now named Secret Exit LTD, and also used the name Skinflake Games in early development. Under the Secret Exit name, they have made Turbo Dismount, Turbo Dismount 2 and other games.

tAAt also founded a non-profit organization, tAAt ry, in Finland, for the promotion of demoscene culture. tAAt ry has organized such computer competitions as the Text Mode Demo Contest and musitAAtio composing challenge.
