= Euphoria (software) =

Game animation middleware

- Developer: NaturalMotion
- Operating system: iOS; Microsoft Windows; macOS; Linux; PlayStation 3; PlayStation 4; PlayStation 5; Xbox 360; Xbox One; Xbox Series X; Xbox Series S; Nintendo Switch; Nintendo Switch 2; Android
- Type: Motion engine, human physics engine
- License: Proprietary
- Website: NaturalMotion.com

Euphoria is a game animation middleware created by NaturalMotion based on Dynamic Motion Synthesis, NaturalMotion's proprietary technology for animating 3D characters on-the-fly "based on a full simulation of the 3D character, including body, muscles and motor nervous system". Instead of using predefined animations, the characters' actions and reactions are synthesized in real-time; they are different every time, even when replaying the same scene. While it is common for current video games to use limp "ragdolls" for animations generated on the fly, Euphoria employed a more complex method to animate the entirety of physically bound objects within the game environment. The engine was to be used in an Indiana Jones game that was later cancelled. According to its web site, Euphoria ran on the Microsoft Windows, macOS, Linux, PlayStation 3, PlayStation 4, Xbox 360, Xbox One, iOS and Android platforms and was compatible with all commercial physics engines.

A press release that was enclosed with the second trailer eventually confirmed that Grand Theft Auto IV is the first of Rockstar's games to feature Euphoria. Red Dead Redemption is their second game to use this engine. The Star Wars titles, Star Wars: The Force Unleashed and The Force Unleashed II use Euphoria, as do games based on the Rockstar Advanced Game Engine (RAGE) including Grand Theft Auto V and Red Dead Redemption 2. Euphoria is integrated into the source code of RAGE. In 2017, NaturalMotion announced it would end licensing of Euphoria, along with its other technologies, to concentrate on mobile games.

== Software using Euphoria ==
- In February 2007, NaturalMotion and Rockstar Games announced that Euphoria would be used in future Rockstar titles.
- In August 2007, NaturalMotion announced Backbreaker, an American football game for next-generation consoles that employs Euphoria to generate tackles in real-time, as opposed to playback animation.
- The July 2009 issue of Game Informer confirmed that Max Payne 3 would include Euphoria along with Rockstar's RAGE.
- NaturalMotion's iOS title Clumsy Ninja uses Euphoria, and is the first mobile game to do so.
