= List of Chad Vader: Day Shift Manager characters =

This page is a comprehensive listing and detailing of the various characters in the web series Chad Vader: Day Shift Manager, divided sectionally as appropriate.

== Main characters ==
Chad Vader, as portrayed by Aaron Yonda.

=== Chad Vader ===
Chad Vader (portrayed by Aaron Yonda and voiced by Matt Sloan) is the protagonist of the series, and day shift manager of Empire Market. Sometimes using lines lifted from the Star Wars films, Chad's original main goal was to crush the store's competition and help make it dominate the food retailing industry. However, this later changed into a desire to become general manager. While he has harsh relationships with some of his co-workers, most notably Clint, he has better ones with others, such as his "apprentice" Jeremy. Chad implies in "The Date" that his older brother is Darth Vader, and that he gave Chad a life support suit similar to his own when Chad accidentally rode his bicycle into a volcano; Chad lost touch with his family when they moved to Tatooine without him. Though Chad's loyalty to the store is unquestionable, his habit of maiming customers and brandishing his lightsaber has led to trouble with management. He was devoted to his initial day shift manager position, and quit his job when he was demoted to the night shift; however, he later returned. At the conclusion of the third season, Chad is finally promoted to the general manager position. In season 4, he finds his "dark, soul half" and becomes a much harsher manager. He promotes Maggie to be his deputy and fired a popular stockboy for making a song called "Chad Vader Makes Me Cry". Later, Michelle breaks up with Chad for treating the employees poorly. Chad hires imperial troopers to make sure the employees are doing their jobs. He turns the employee lounge into his personal palace and makes Lloyd his pet and Jimmy his slave dancer. When he orders Michelle to be his girlfriend again, she shoots a stormtrooper and quits. When he and Maggie find Jeremy and Jimmy trying to fix the generator, Chad decides to fix it but gets electrocuted and almost dies. It is revealed that Maggie sabotaged the generator to kill Chad and become general manager again, but when Hal Thompson revives Chad, she tosses her helmet in the trash and escapes. Chad later demotes himself to day shift manager and promotes Jeremy to general manager.

=== Jeremy Wickstrom ===
Jeremy Wickstrom (Paul Guse) is an Empire Market employee who idolizes Chad and wears the headpiece of an Imperial Ground Officer (which is the back piece of the Hasbro Darth Vader Voice Changer mask). He is usually referred to by Vader as "Commander Wickstrom", and is treated as his "young apprentice". Jeremy eventually transfers to the Night Shift with Chad, until Chad went back to being a Day Shift Manager. In "Chad Fights Back", he is shown to have the power of the Force when he pulls a broom to his hand. Jeremy often sees Chad more as his leader than his boss. In the second season, Chad neglects Jeremy in favor of Robby Johnson, which leads to Jeremy being persuaded by Margaret McCall to betray Chad by spying on him with Libby. In "Bandito Beatdown", Jeremy is shown to be upset with Chad's apparent betrayal and confused about what he should do. He also regrets telling McCall about Chad dating Libby, but accepts McCall's offer to become the store's general manager, angering Chad, who wanted the position, and leading the two to a lightsaber duel in "Showdown" and "Somebody Dies." In "Somebody Dies", Jeremy accidentally delivers a fatal wound to Weird Jimmy with his lightsaber, and is demoted back to being a shift worker. He and Chad make amends and Chad re-appoints him as his apprentice, while the ghost of Weird Jimmy begins to haunt him. In season 3, Jeremy is being trained in "expecting the unexpected". It is revealed that he is being haunted by Jimmy's spirit, who also informs him that Jeremy is "the key for stopping him" (referring to Randy). In "Six Ways to Die", after learning that the final Baby Cookie bomb is inside the Surveillance Assailant, he decides to sacrifice himself by taking it out of the store, but Damien Nightshayde stops him and instead does so in his place. Feeling responsible for the deaths of both Jimmy and Damien, Jeremy informs Chad that he is leaving to go on a journey of self-discovery. Michelle, however, assures Chad that he will be back. In "The Return of Weird Jimmy, Part 2", he stumbles into the store in tattered clothing, asking for help. The next episode explained that after Jeremy left the store, he went home and played Skyrim for 3 days straight with no food or water. After that, he walked near the homeless district to find some food when Ben the ghost appeared. Ben explains how Jeremy's fate lies back at the store by Chad's side forever. Chad then quickly rehires him but at the end of the episode, it is revealed that Chad bribed Ben to convince Jeremy to return to the store. It turns out that Jeremy's true destiny lies at the Michigan Institution of Technology. In "Chad Vader Dies", Jeremy and Jimmy try to fix the generator but get caught by Chad and Maggie. Chad decides to fix the generator but ends up getting electrocuted and almost dies. When Chad revives, he becomes the day shift manager and promotes Jeremy to general manager.

=== Clint Shermer ===
Clint Shermer (Matt Sloan)(Season 1 and 3) is Chad's nemesis, former night shift manager of Empire Market and the main antagonist of Season 1. In the first season, Clint is a bully who constantly abuses Chad; the two had frequent altercations where Chad brandished his lightsaber at Clint. After Chad quit his job in season one, Clint - having been promoting to day shift manager in Chad's place - began abusing his subordinates. His treatment of Jeremy greatly angered Chad, who subsequently defeated Clint and forced him to quit.

In the third season, Clint returns at the behest of Maggie, who hires him back as a "manager-for-a-day". This time around, Clint has filed a restraining order against Chad, wearing a device that sounds an alarm if Chad comes within three feet of him (If the aforementioned alarm goes off for longer the five seconds, Chad would be arrested). As manager-for-a-day, he has Empire Market run as a "crazy store" to attract new customers. Tensions between him and Chad boil to a point where they have a lightsaber duel in the stockroom, though they stop when they learn that Randy has planted bombs around the store. Clint defuses most of the bombs. As a result of his actions, Clint is promoted as the general manager of a new Empire Market branch. In the Season 4 episode "The Return of Brian", former store employee-turned-actor Brian Krause tells everyone about when Chad first punched in, and how he broke the machine and tried to clean it up. The flashback reveals that back then, Clint was actually a nice guy who offered to help Chad clean up the clock. However, when Randy showed up, Chad told him that Clint attacked him from behind with a vacuum. Clint got in trouble and from that point forward, Chad and Clint became enemies.

=== Randy Morgan ===
Randy Morgan (Brad Knight) (main Season 1-3) is Chad's boss as the general manager of Empire Market, but is later demoted to night shift manager and janitor. Chad, who takes his day manager job seriously, practically worships Randy, kneeling before him and calling him "Emperor". Randy - as seen in the first Chad Vader episodes, as well as Chad's training videos - is often unsettled or annoyed by Chad's valorous treatment of him. Randy demotes Chad to managing the night shift during the first season for spying on him with a hologram, causing Chad to quit. However, he hires him back after Chad settles his score with Clint.

During the second season, Randy himself is put on the night shift by McCall after a demonstration of Empire Market's checkout system goes awry. The night shift drives Randy insane, making him believe he can talk to Baby Cookie, a doll belonging to a strange customer named Hal. Randy steals Baby Cookie and proceeds to have hallucinatory one-sided "conversations" with the doll. With Cookie's help, Randy tries to kill Chad with a sword; when he fails, he is appointed janitor in Weird Jimmy's place. In the third season, Randy claims to be cured, but relapses when Baby Cookie turns up in the store. After Hal retrieves Baby Cookie, Randy reveals his collection of Baby Cookie-like dolls, rigging them with time bombs and planting them throughout the store. However, his plan is thwarted by Chad and Clint, as well as Damien. In the fourth season episode "Surprise Inspection", it is revealed that, despite his attempt to destroy the market, Randy is still employed there, as Chad mentions him as one of the many employees he has to manage.

=== Weird Jimmy ===
"Weird" Jimmy (Craig Johnson) is the insane janitor of the store. He used to be the day shift manager, but later lost his position and was assigned to the night shift, which caused his instability. He has many bizarre quirks, such as talking to his mop, believing in the existence of elves, and having an obsession with firearms. In the second-season finale "Somebody Dies", Jimmy was accidentally killed by Jeremy when he was trying to save Chad from an assassination attempt by a crazed Randy. He then reappears as a spirit and haunts Jeremy, calling him a murderer, out of a need to be avenged (though this seems to merely be his excuse, as he derives great pleasure from scaring Jeremy, but is a big help when it comes to getting him out of the cooler and later saving the store). In Season 4, when his brother Johnny came to the market to pick up his late sibling's belongings, Jimmy possessed him as a way of cleaning the store once again.

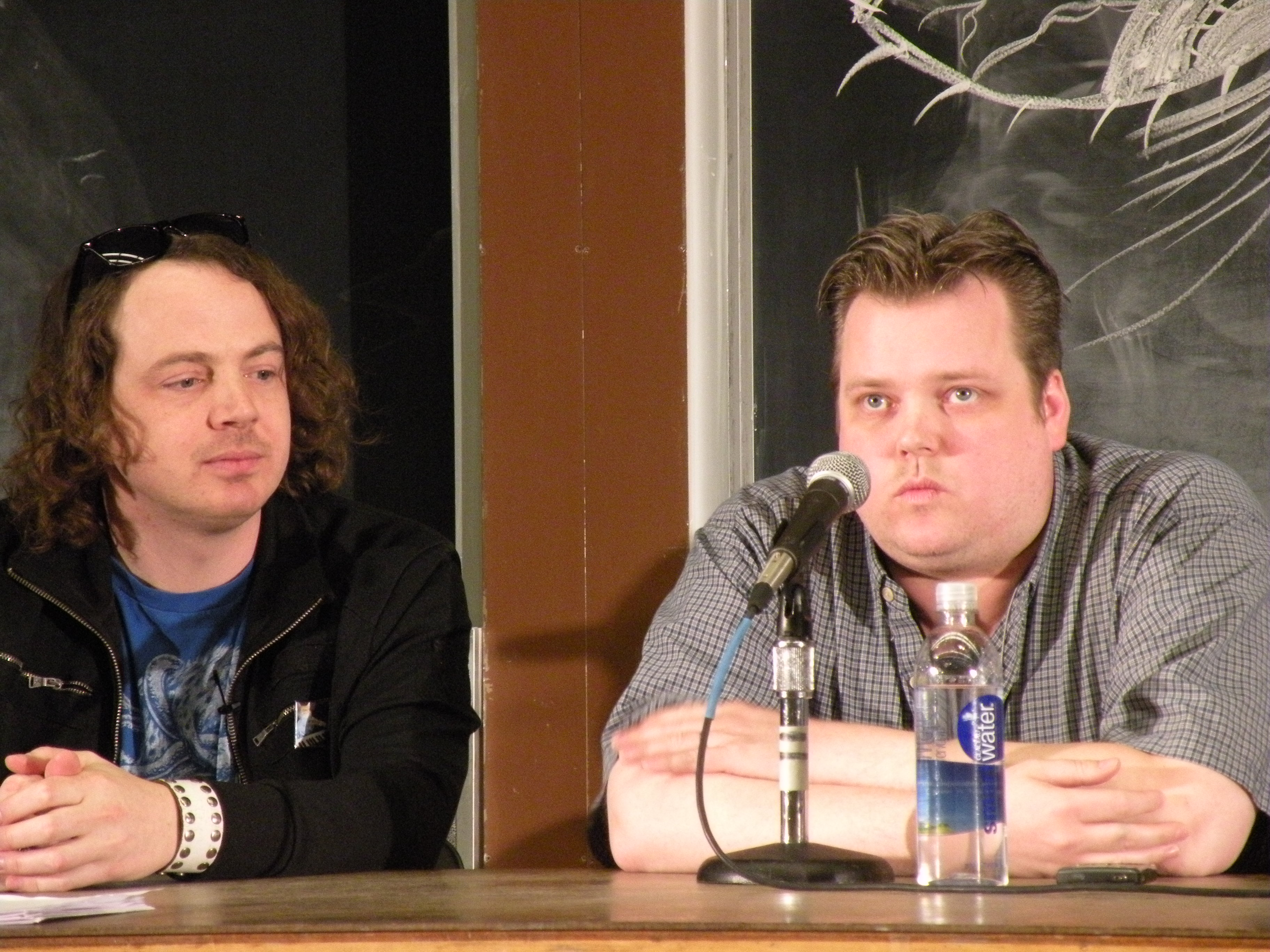
Yonda (left) plays Chad Vader and Hal Thompson. Sloan (right) voices Chad Vader and plays Clint Shermer and Champion J. Pepper

== Recurring characters ==
- Margaret "Maggie" McCall (Karen Moeller) – The new owner of Empire Market and the main antagonist of seasons 2–4. She is the liaison for Red Leader Foods that Mr. Pepper sold Empire Market to. Outwardly, she appears nice, but, in truth, has many hidden unpleasant qualities. She is indifferent to others' well being, and apparently has a small amount of values, especially when she starts turning Jeremy into her personal spy, using a technique similar to that Emperor Palpatine did to Anakin Skywalker. McCall is also responsible for Randy's mental collapse after assigning him to the night shift, and for having Libby deported to her native island country New Zealand, after she learns of her romantic relationship with Chad. In many episodes, Chad fantasizes about killing McCall. She is subsequently removed from Empire Market by a clause in her contract, but she demands a job, accepting the night shift manager job (which she takes as an honor, much to Champion's annoyance). In the season 4 premiere, it is implied that her new position is taking its toll on her mental state, and that she is plotting her revenge against Chad. In "Vader Vs. Vader", she manipulates him into giving her a job as his assistant/advisor, and then assigns Jeremy to the night shift.
- Lloyd (Rob Matsushita) – An employee who is fond of making sexually suggestive remarks and is a friend of Clint. Chad is deeply irritated by him and will often torture him in many different ways, including Force chokes and using the Force to hurl store produce and items at him. Despite Chad's harsh treatment of Lloyd, the two usually hang out together outside of work. (as seen in most of the Babelgum videos) The episode "The Return of Brian" implies that he is a big fan of the television series Charmed.
- Clarissa (Christina LaVicka) – A cashier at Empire Market who once went on a date with Chad, but later dated Clint. She twice asked Chad if he wanted to go on another date after Clint had quit his job. The first time, Chad said he had to check his schedule, the second time he flat out declined, informing her that he was dating Libby. Apparently, she still has some lingering feelings for him. Her last appearance was in the Season 3 episode "Nothing Happens". After this episode she is never seen nor mentioned again. It is therefore unclear whether or not she is still employed at Empire Market as she is not present at the award ceremony in "Six Ways to Die".
- Libby (Kate Sprecher) – McCall's assistant whom Chad begins to fall in love with. The two of them kiss in "First Kiss", directly before she is deported back to New Zealand by McCall after learning of her relationship with Chad. She returns in season 4, during "Surprise Inspection", in which Chad videochats with her and tries to rub his new girlfriend, Michelle, in her face, only for his plan to blow up in his when Libby introduces him to her husband, Brandon.
- Michelle (Sarah Rogers) – An employee of Empire Market and also Chad's neighbor, with whom Chad becomes infatuated. She makes her first appearance in "Return of Clint", where Chad attempts to ask her out, but is prevented from doing so by Clint. After the two are out of earshot, Michelle comments to herself that she thinks Chad is "kind of cute". In "Sick Day", she brings him some chicken soup when she hears he has gotten the cold. In the third-season finale, she asks him if he would like to go on a date, and Chad accepts her offer. In the fourth season premiere, it is mentioned that she is on vacation, from which she returns in "Vader vs. Vader". However, her relationship with Chad quickly becomes strained because of his newly adopted tyrannical attitude, which eventually causes her to end things with him in "Surprise Inspection".
- Sean Banditson (Sean Moore) – A former customer and later employee of Empire Market who became Chad's self-declared arch-nemesis after Chad ended a store sale on marshmallows. His alter-ego is a supervillain called "Marshmallow Bandito", which appeared twice in Season 2 and once in Season 3. He was a failed manager-for-a-day in the episode "Rockets and Chaos". When he injured several customers, he was placed in jail, and his last request for Chad was to bring him marshmallows. He has not been seen since, although he did appear in "Chad Vader's Halloween Seance", one of the Babelgum videos.
- Damien Nightshayde (Ian Zander) – An emo-esque vampire-like man who was hired by Clint as the new stock boy. All female employees find him attractive, which annoys Chad. Damien is protective of various characters, frequently declaring that he will keep them from harm's way "until [his] heart stops beating". By doing so with Jeremy, he is killed by a Baby Cookie bomb when it detonated inside the Surveillance Assailant. His portrayer is the son of Robin Zander, from Cheap Trick.
- Baby Cookie (Voiced by Matt Sloan) – A cursed doll which Clint finds in a shop, and is bought by Hal. She is able to speak telepathically and give "special powers", like the ability to debone a chicken. Hal keeps her until Randy steals her. Cookie's influence corrupted Randy, who attempts an assassination on Chad Vader; Jimmy is slaughtered instead. Cookie partially regains his sanity and attempts to enslave him to her will, but failed until "Return of Clint", in which Clint is able to pressure him to join him in a struggle against Chad. Later, Hal confronts Randy in an attempt to liberate his "special baby friend". After defeating Randy, Hal takes her back with him. Randy, however, has several different Baby Cookie dolls in multiple lockers. She is the childhood doll of producer Courtney Collins. Baby Cookie was featured in a video parody of Bing Crosby and David Bowie's Peace on Earth/Little Drummer Boy. She also starred in her own unique "Baby Cookie's Got Answer."
- Champion J. Pepper (Matt Sloan) – The original owner of Empire Market and Clint's father. Although he and Clint look almost identical (since both are portrayed by Sloan) they have completely different personalities. Champion, unlike Clint, is kind-hearted and likes Chad, seeing him as a surrogate son (as stated in "The Improvised Episode"), implying that Champion and Clint have strained relationship. Champion states that when he was younger he had a personality similar to Maggie, but learned to "think with [his] heart more than [his] head". He wears a cowboy hat and speaks with a Texas accent, and is fond of introducing himself every time he enters a room, as it is a "new thing [he] is trying out". He sold the market to Red Leader Foods, a corporate conglomerate, but bought it back in the third-season finale.
- Ben (Mike McCafferty) – A Jedi spirit who stopped Chad from committing suicide and helps him get his life back together. He claims his death was caused by driving drunk over a gas station pump, which then exploded. He can appear suddenly, but disappearing requires additional effort, such as performing a song and dance, or doing a strange scream three times. He briefly reappears in one of the Babelgum videos, "Chad Vader's Halloween Seance", with some important news for Chad. Unfortunately, Chad does not want to hear it. In the third episode of Season 4, Jeremy tells Chad about how Ben appeared to him and told him that his destiny is to work at the store forever. However, it is later revealed that Chad bribed Ben to tell him that.
- Hal Thompson (Aaron Yonda) – An odd man who searches for bizarre items within the store, often for his "voodoo ritual". He is one of the main characters in one of Blame Society Productions other series, "Fun Rangers". Yonda also plays Chad (but does not provide the voice). This factor is the main reason both Hal and Chad have rarely been seen in the same shot standing. Hal is also the original owner of Baby Cookie, whom he bought from an unknown shop. He spent quite a lot of time with her until Randy stole her from him in "The New Employee", but he was able to reacquire her, in the episode "Sick Day".
- Tony Edwards (Asa Derks) – An employee in Empire Market who does not like Chad. He can be seen in the first two episodes. Chad refers to him as "Commander Edwards," much to Tony's annoyance. He made a comeback appearance in "Surveillance Assistant", where Chad considers him for the role as manager. He makes his prominent appearance as the manager in episode 4 of season 3, when he is chosen to be the manager for a day. His cynical and careless point of view affects the store employees as they find the things that they do everyday are boring. In the end, Tony belatedly storms out to go home in excitement, with Chad remarking that he is the greatest manager ever.
- Tammy (Kealynn Kees) – An employee in Empire Market who refuses Chad's proposal for her to work an extra shift in the first episode. She will occasionally make appearances in the background.
- Lionel (William Bolz) – A weird employee in Empire Market who always says that customers "save a lot". In one of the episodes he asks Chad if anything is faster than the speed of light (referencing Star Wars spaceships). He brings his dog into the store in episode 4, but refuses to search for him when he runs off, saying "I'm not supposed to leave the cash register". He made a short appearance in "Showdown", where he uses the conveyor belt to move a coconut, telling Jeremy "It's alive!". He also appears in "The Return of Weird Jimmy", where he sees Johnny, who is being possessed by Jimmy, and, mistaking him for the latter, asks him if he has been on vacation.
- Star Wars Nerd (Steve Agee) – A Star Wars fan whom Chad sees when he is about to commit suicide.
- Mayor (Mayor Dave Cieslewicz) – The mayor of Madison. Chad tries working for him in the episode "New Job", but it does not work out. He reappears in "Chad Fights Back", where he encourages Chad not to give up during his fight against Clint.
- Mouse Droid – a somewhat Dalek-like droid that cleans the floors and attacked Hal in season two. It also appears in Season 3, when Chad Vader tests his lightning powers on it.
- Robby Johnson (Wolfgang Stein) – A young, impressionable Empire Market employee who had worked there for half a day, before he was terminated after following the instructions in Chad's training videos. He was rehired by Maggie in the episode "The New Employee". In "First Kiss", he was selected by her as an employee who demonstrated skills, and thus was given a free meal at Gino's Pizzeria Facility. He was accompanied by Chad and Libby, all of whom got drunk, leading Robby to obsess over staying intoxicated forever. In "Somebody Dies", it is shown that he has since become an alcoholic. In his debut episode, he states that, as he does not have a family of his own, he views the market's staff as one, particularly Chad, whom he sees as both a mentor and a father, before revealing that he believes that Chad "Probably is [his] father", since he has "Never seen [Chad's] face". Despite this, an exchange between Chad, Maggie and Robby in "First Kiss" implies that he is attracted to him.
- Johnny (also portrayed by Craig Johnson) – Jimmy's twin brother, a Christian who claims to be a volunteer at the Church of The Holy Jesus Flame, but in actuality was kicked out years ago for stealing from the poor. He makes his debut in "The Return of Weird Jimmy", where he comes to Empire Market to pick up his brother's personal effects, but ends up having his body taken over by Jimmy's spirit.
- Brian Krause (Brian Krause) – A former employee of Empire Market. He shows up in the fourth season episode "The Return of Brian", where he reveals to the staff how he used to be employed at the store during the time Chad first started working there. In the next episode, he goes on to tell them many embarrassing stories from Chad's past. He appears to be somewhat crazed, as before he departs, he jokes about Chad once massacring customers, which disturbs everyone.
- Andy Gibson (Andy Gibson) – Nicknamed "Adorable Andy" by the employees, is a handsome young stock boy, who had been working as a dock worker for the last eight years until Chad promoted him the day before "Vader vs. Vader" (although Chad has no recollection of this). In the next episode, Chad (under Maggie's influence) implements a list of absurd rules, which includes the banning of the use of guitars and Andy's nickname, as well as one that forces the stock boy to wear a horse mask. Later, Chad catches him in the back of the store, maskless, and playing his guitar for the staff while singing them a song he wrote called "Chad Vader Makes Me Wanna Cry", leading to an enraged Chad to promptly fire him, which, in turn, forces a melancholy Andy to sign a recording contract to make a living (although he does decide to continue wearing the mask).
- Brandon (Justin Sprecher) – Libby's husband, whom she met after she was deported back to New Zealand. He meets Chad while Libby videochats with him in "Surprise Inspection", however Chad, upset that Libby has married just months after the two were forced to break up, instantly takes a disliking to him. In real life, the actor who portrays him is married to Kate Sprecher, who plays Libby.
