= Glenn Rubenstein =

American journalist (born 1976)

Glenn Rubenstein (born March 2, 1976) is a writer, director, and journalist based in Northern California.

== Journalism ==
Rubenstein has been a columnist for the San Francisco Examiner, Sports Illustrated for Kids, CNET's (now defunct) GameCenter, Wizard Magazine, and many other national publications. He was one of the original Contributing Editors for Wired Magazine, and one of the founding editors at the console section of GameSpot. He has also contributed dozens of reviews and previews to the TechTV/G4 television show X-Play.

He began writing for his hometown paper, The Argus Courier, in 1990 (at the age of 14). His writing has mainly focused on topics relating to video games and technology.

From 1993 to 1995, he co-hosted the nationally syndicated On Computers radio show with Leo Laporte and Gina Smith. He also made frequent appearances on MSNBC's The Site (with Soledad O'Brien), G4's Icons show, and was a frequent guest on Live 105's The Alex Bennett Show.

== Author ==
Rubenstein is the author of Podcast Advertising Works: How to Turn Engaged Audiences into Loyal Customers, ISBN 978-1539374466. The book relates lessons learned from his time as Director of Marketing for TWiT as well as with his own podcast advertising agency, Adopter Media. Topics within the book include: why podcast advertising works, what podcasters can do to make their ads more effective, and an explanation of the business practices involved.

In 2001, Rubenstein wrote Sports Gamer: The Guide to Sports Video Games.

== lonelygirl15 ==
As of late 2006, Glenn Rubenstein was also credited as both a writer and director on many episodes of the web-based video series lonelygirl15.

In early 2007, it was revealed that he was the Puppet Master of the Alternate Reality Game OpAphid, and the creator of the characters OpAphid, Tachyon, and 10033/Brother, for which he also provided the voice. OpAphid returned as a supporting character for his follow-up series RedEarth88.

On October 15, 2007, The New York Times reported that Rubenstein had collaborated on a video with Gary Brolsma, as well as Chad Vader's Aaron Yonda and Matt Sloan, as a part of Canon's Battle of the Internet Superstars.

== Podcasting ==
In 2011, Rubenstein hosted the videogame-focused At The Controls with Brian Brushwood and Tom Merritt on the TWiT podcast network. In 2012, he hosted the TWiT LAN Party Shut Up and Play. It began airing weekly every Sunday at 7pm PST starting on January 15, 2012, and was part of a several hour long LAN Party which included a grudge match on consoles which featured Glenn playing against other TWIT employees and hosts.

Since Summer of 2016, Glenn has also been host of the Wrestling Inc. podcast. Rubenstein is often joined by WrestlingInc.com founder Raj Giri, Justin LaBar, and former professional wrestler Matt Morgan to recap WWE Raw, WWE Smackdown, AEW Dynamite, and WWE and AEW Pay-Per-View Events.
