= List of Chad Vader: Day Shift Manager episodes =

This page shows a list of episodes for the web television series Chad Vader: Day Shift Manager, created by Aaron Yonda and Matt Sloan. The series was initially launched on Channel 101, but was cancelled after the first two episodes were released. Yonda and Sloan decided to continue the series on YouTube, as well as Blame Society Productions' independent website. It has become the signature show for Yonda and Sloan, who have since built on their success with additional shows and characters.

The show stars Chad Vader, the non-canonical brother of Star Wars villain Darth Vader; Chad is visually indistinguishable from Darth, save for his selfish and petty demeanor. The show follows Chad as he interacts with the customers and co-workers at Empire Market, where he is the day shift manager. Chad has a best friend in his "apprentice", Jeremy Wickstrom, while he is often at odds with night shift manager Clint Shermer and corporate owner Margaret McCall.

Chad Vader: Day Shift Manager has been the subject of great fanfare and acclaim, winning an Official Star Wars Fan Film Award. Because of his near-perfect impression of Darth Vader when voicing Chad, Matt Sloan was tapped by LucasArts to become Vader's new voice; Sloan voices Vader in the video games Empire at War: Forces of Corruption and Star Wars: The Force Unleashed. Chad Vader has also appeared on other web series, as well as Star Wars fan conventions.

== Episodes ==
=== Season 1 (2006–07) ===
No.	Title	Link	Length	Original release date
1	"A Galaxy Not So Far Away"		04:46	July 10, 2006
This episode establishes the character of Chad Vader, the day shift manager at a grocery store called Empire Market, as well as his co-workers, including his boss, Randy, and night shift manager Clint Shermer, with whom Chad has an intensely adversarial relationship. Chad manages to convince attractive cashier Clarissa to have a date with him, under the pretext of discussing "some plans I have for a more powerful laser checkout system". Later on, Chad gets into a fight with Clint, threatening him with his lightsaber. However, Chad trips on a banana peel Clint throws under him, and is left in pain on the floor by Clint.
2	"The Date"		05:13	July 31, 2006
Chad Vader continues his training of two Empire Market employees, Tony Edwards and Jeremy Wickstrom. Tony, annoyed with Chad's behavior, leaves him with the more enthusiastic Jeremy, whom Chad takes under his wing as his "apprentice." During his date with Clarissa, Chad confides to her that the reason he wears his suit is for life support after he accidentally rode his bicycle into a volcano; the suit was given to him by his "famous brother." Clarissa expresses sympathy for Chad. Later at work, Chad is caught using his hologram to spy on Clint while he is complaining to Randy about Chad's behavior. Randy, furious, gives the day manager position to Clint while giving Chad the night shift.
3	"The Night Shift"		05:36	September 1, 2006
It's Chad's first shift as night manager, and he finds that Empire Market is inhabited by strange employees and customers after dark. "Commander" Jeremy Wickstrom, Chad's new apprentice, has transferred to the night shift to assist him. After dealing with some of the store's unusual customers, Chad calls Clarissa on the phone. It is revealed that Clarissa stood up Chad on their second date the previous night. After Clarissa abruptly ends his call, Chad gets into a physical confrontation with a gloating Clint, who, to Chad's horror, reveals that he has begun to date Clarissa.
4	"A Dog in the Store"		06:02	October 11, 2006
Chad is still on his first night shift. Jeremy urgently reports to Chad that a dog is loose in the store. After giving Jeremy the job of finding the dog, Chad spends some time to himself on the loading dock out back, using his hologram to spy on Clarissa sleeping. He is later joined by "Weird Jimmy", Empire Market's strange janitor. Weird Jimmy reveals to Chad that he was once a day shift manager himself, but had some "minor problems" after being given the night manager position. Chad and Jeremy later chase down the dog loose in the store, which turns out to belong to the store's slightly deranged night-time cashier, Lionel. The following morning, Chad sees Clint complaining to Randy about their fight earlier that night. When Randy confronts Chad, and refuses to give him back the day manager position, Chad quits his job.
5	"Drunk"		06:03	December 20, 2006
It's almost Christmas, and Chad Vader, now unemployed, gets drunk at a bar while spying on Clint and Clarissa nearby. Clint and Chad almost have a fistfight, but Clint relents to go to the bathroom. When Chad confronts Clarissa, she asks Chad to "do something useful with your life and stop being so lame". A drunk, spurned Chad leaves the bar. Later on, Chad stands on a bridge at a park, contemplating suicide. Just as he is about to jump, Chad is met by a Force ghost named Ben, the spirit of a drunk driver who died after he ran over a gas pump that exploded. Ben manages to help Chad take Clarissa's advice to do something with his life, and Chad resolves to find another job. Chad is later seen at his new job, wearing what would pass for a business suit.
6	"New Job"		05:57	February 16, 2007
Over the course of two days, Chad is hired as a telemarketer and a printer, but is quickly fired due to his erratic, aggressive behavior. Ben appears to Chad again to persuade him to return to Empire Market, but Chad balks at the idea and runs away. Meanwhile at Empire Market, Chad's old co-workers, including Jeremy and Clarissa, begin reminiscing about Chad's career there. It is revealed that Clint, as day manager, has begun to bully his subordinates, including Clarissa. Chad, meanwhile, is hired and quickly fired both as a janitor and a cleaner for Dave Cieslewicz, the mayor of Madison, Wisconsin. Chad has begun working as a taxicab driver when he is again visited by Ben and is finally persuaded to go back to Empire Market to get his old job back. Chad Vader returns to the store, confronts Randy, and demands that he be re-hired.
7	"Trapped in the Trash"		06:28	March 23, 2007
Chad threatens to not leave the store until he gets his job back. He vows to buy an item once every hour to avoid a loitering charge. However, Chad admits he's broke to Jeremy, but the latter hatches an irrational plan to shut down the store's power. After another visitation from Ben, Chad realizes he must settle his score with Clint once and for all. Dubiously assuming Clint's identity, Chad begins to sully Clint's reputation by verbally assaulting customers and behaving erratically. He is helped by Clarissa—whom he reconciles with—when she gives him Clint's name tag, which Chad prominently displays on his suit. This leads to customers unloading a ton of complaints against Clint. However, Clint deduces the ruse and angrily confronts Chad. As he does so, Jeremy, with Weird Jimmy's help, cuts off the store's power supply. In the dark, Clint and Chad begin their final battle.
8	"Chad Fights Back"		05:33	May 11, 2007
Clint manages to gain the upper hand once the store's emergency power kicks in, and knocks Chad to the floor. Chad feels like giving up, but finds upliftment when Clarissa, Weird Jimmy, Chad's co-workers, customers, former employers, and Mayor Cieslewicz profess their belief in him. Chad is further provoked when he sees Clint bullying Jeremy. Using the Force, Chad manages to attack Clint with a barrage of lemons, and pushes him into a display of lettuce. Later on, Chad tells Randy that Clint damaged the lemons and cabbage display by himself and quit, claiming his former enemy "has mental problems". Randy reluctantly gives Chad the day manager position back, on the condition that Chad change his attitude. Randy further tells Chad that there's talk of a conglomerate buying out Empire Market. Later on, Clarissa and Chad arrange another date, and Chad discovers that Jeremy has begun using the Force. The first season ends with Chad telling his apprentice Jeremy about his new plans for Empire Market.

=== Season 2 (2009) ===
No.	Title	Link	Length	Original release date
1	"The Takeover"		5:44	January 31, 2009
Chad and his co-workers show up for work as Empire Market is purchased by the conglomerate Red Leader Foods. He meets the owner of Empire Market, Champion J. Pepper, as well as Red Leader representative Maggie McCall, and her assistant, Libby. Chad and Libby seem to be attracted to each other. Randy and Champion move off to discuss business, leaving Chad with the task of giving the two visitors a tour of the market, including his project, the "more powerful laser checkout system" mentioned during the first season. However, Clarissa tells Jeremy that the checkout system is malfunctioning.
2	"Laser Trouble"		4:58	February 21, 2009
Chad continues his tour of Empire Market with Maggie and Libby. After some awkward encounters with Chad's cleaning droids and Weird Jimmy, Chad takes the pair to the cash register to demonstrate the checkout system. Jeremy desperately tries to stop them, only to be repeatedly dismissed by Chad. When Maggie buys a can of beans and Chad swipes it through the checkout system, the machine causes the can to explode. Maggie, covered in beans, angrily vows to keep watch on Chad and chastises Randy for supposed incompetence.
3	"Into the Basement"		5:45	March 17, 2009
At a staff meeting, Maggie announces that she is the new general manager, while Randy has been transferred to the dreaded night shift. She rolls out several strict regulations, including the prohibition of employees to date each other. Maggie tasks Chad with venturing into the store's mysterious basement to perform a yearly boiler recalibration. Chad performs the task with Jeremy, but the two are quickly separated. Chad comes across a ghostly vision of Libby, which causes him to fall into a hole. Jeremy encounters a monstrous droid before being attacked by an unseen presence.
4	"The Basement Strikes Back"		5:43	April 24, 2009
Jeremy is found by Weird Jimmy, who helps him recalibrate the boiler. On the way, Jeremy sees strange visions of himself and McCall in a mirror. They soon find Chad. As the three try to make their way out of the basement, they run into three hostile droids. Jeremy is forced to defeat the droids alone, using Chad's lightsaber. The trio hold an impromptu funeral for Weird Jimmy's beloved mop—which was destroyed in the battle—with Weird Jimmy playing a somber saxophone tune. As they leave the basement, Chad admits that he built the droids.
5	"The New Employee"		5:22	June 5, 2009
Chad encounters Hal, a strange customer who is shopping for clothes for his doll, Baby Cookie. He is also hit with a marshmallow. Chad discovers that Randy has gone insane after two weeks as night shift manager. Chad learns that Maggie has re-hired Robby Johnson, an Empire Market employee who was fired for taking Chad's questionable training videos too seriously. McCall orders Chad to train Robby and neglect Jeremy, as part of her own evil plan. Maggie later approaches Jeremy and claims that Chad hates him, saying that "we will be monitoring the progress of your career very closely."
6	"First Kiss"		5:18	July 24, 2009
Randy snatches Baby Cookie from Hal, claiming the doll as his own. Maggie has Chad take Robby and Libby to a restaurant as part of a rewards program. While an ecstatic Chad expresses his delight to finally go out with Libby, he is hit by a second marshmallow. After leaving the restaurant, Chad and Libby are left alone. Chad tells Libby agree to a date despite Maggie's rules, kissing as best they can through Chad's breathing apparatus. Unbeknownst to them, Jeremy witnesses the encounter and returns to Empire Market to report to Maggie.
7	"Goodbye, Chad"		4:25	September 18, 2009
When Chad arrives at work the following day, he is shocked to discover that Maggie knows about his relationship with Libby, who has been deported back to New Zealand for "having her papers out of order". Maggie gives Chad a letter left for him by Libby, in which she apologizes for being deported and claims that her work visa was improperly revoked, implying that Maggie is responsible. Chad is depressed at his loss. He then discovers the person who has been throwing marshmallows at him: the Marshmallow Bandito, a strange man in a chef costume who claims to be Chad's archnemesis.
8	"Bandito Beatdown"		3:50	September 25, 2009
The Marshmallow Bandito reveals his origins, claiming to have been a customer who had a confrontation with Chad about a marshmallow sale. The encounter drove the Bandito over the edge, leading to his vendetta against Chad. Chad manages to defeat and humiliate the Bandito in the subsequent fight. However, Chad continues to show grief over Libby. Jeremy sees this and feels guilt about betraying him, admitting his deed to Weird Jimmy. Meanwhile, Baby Cookie forces Randy to dance for him to prove his loyalty. To Randy's shock, Baby Cookie asks if he would also kill for him.
9	"Showdown"		6:49	October 22, 2009
Jeremy has a private meeting with Maggie, expressing his guilt over Libby's deportation and doubt over whether he should continue working at Empire Market. Maggie entices Jeremy with a promotion to general manager, sending him to a two-week management training camp. Jeremy returns from the training camp in a business suit, in the same manner in which he saw himself in the basement. Maggie name him general manager, giving him the first task of firing Randy. Chad, seeing that things "have taken a turn for the even worse", decides to intervene. That night, when Jeremy arrives at the market to fire Randy, Chad confronts him. When Chad learns of Jeremy's culpability in Libby's deportation, the two begin a lightsaber duel.
10	"Somebody Dies"		6:46	November 26, 2009
Chad and Jeremy continue their duel in the back room, quietly followed by Randy and Baby Cookie. When Chad corners Jeremy, he fails to notice Randy is sneaking up behind him with a sword. Weird Jimmy shoves Randy to save him, causing Jeremy to accidentally wound Weird Jimmy. Weird Jimmy disappears after seeing his mop as a Force ghost. Later, at a staff meeting, Maggie announces that Randy will become the new janitor in Weird Jimmy's absence. She also announces that the general manager position is open, and allows every employee to be general manager for one day even though Chad is next in line. Chad and Jeremy reconcile, but Jeremy becomes haunted by Weird Jimmy and his mop.

=== Season 3 (2010) ===
No.	Title	Link	Length	Original release date
1	"Surveillance Assailant"		5:17	February 12, 2010
At the start of the episode, Chad trains Jeremy with his lightsaber skills. He runs into Maggie, who forces him to choose a "manager-for-a-day", and menacingly claims that she desires to be "friends". He also comes across Randy, who is now Empire Market's janitor; he still shows hints of his purportedly-cured insanity. Afterwards, Chad uses his "Surveillance Assailant"—a security camera made to resemble the Death Star—to spy on three dubious candidates to be "manager-for-a-day": the cynical Tony, the dumb Lloyd, and the would-be "enemy" Sean. With the deadline approaching, Chad hurriedly makes his decision.
2	"Rockets and Chaos"		5:51	March 16, 2010
Chad's pick for "manager-for-a-day" is Sean, who quickly finds the job "boring". Chad anticipates the failure of his would-be nemesis and the rest of the manager-for-a-day candidates, planning to make Maggie promote him to general manager afterwards. However, Maggie tells Chad that she is considering to promote Sean to general manager permanently despite his odd behavior. Sean regresses to his "Marshmallow Bandito" alter ego during an encounter with a customer, mounting Chad's rocket-propelled shopping cart to wreak havoc throughout the store. Chad uses the Surveillance Assailant to stop Sean.
3	"Lloyd Town"		6:02	April 15, 2010
Lloyd is chosen by Chad as the next manager-for-a-day, even though he and Maggie both consider Lloyd to be an incompetent imbecile. Elsewhere, Randy finds Baby Cookie in the cabbage stand, but resists the doll's urging to be friends with him again. Jeremy continues to have trouble with Weird Jimmy. Lloyd's tenure as manager-for-a-day does not last long; when Clarissa threatens to turn Lloyd in for sexual harassment, he panics and sets off the store's fire alarm. Chad covers Lloyd head-to-toe with duct tape, causing him to slowly leave the store in shame.
4	"Nothing Happens"		4:59	May 6, 2010
Chad picks his last choice, the sullen Tony, to be the manager-for-a-day. As the episode's title suggests, Tony's tenure is marked by nothing happening in the store. The characters are uninterested when interacting with each other: Chad and Maggie are too bored to fight each other; Chad does nothing when Lloyd tries to steal coffee beans; and Jeremy and Weird Jimmy find no excitement in the latter's frightening appearances. The tone only changes when Tony clocks out from work, belatedly leaving the store. Chad remarks that Tony is "the greatest manager ever".
5	"Return of Clint"		6:09	June 9, 2010
Because of the failure of all of Chad's manager-for-a-day candidates, Maggie calls in some "outside talent": Clint. Maggie announces that Clint will be re-hired by Empire Market if his stint as manager-for-a-day is successful, and that he will become Chad's boss if this is so. Clint had pulled out a three-foot restraining order against Chad, wearing a device that sounds an alarm if Chad or any Force-thrown object comes too close to him. Clint uses the device to harass Chad, by jumping within three feet of him. However, Chad briefly remedies the situation by using a mind trick on Lloyd, making him shock Clint with a taser. Clint orders a newly insane Randy to return to Baby Cookie; the three launch a scheme against Chad.
6	"Vampire Market"		6:05	July 1, 2010
Clint tries to turn Empire Market into a "crazy store"—ordering bizarre actions such as the posting of outrageously high prices—believing this will bring more customers. He also hires a new stock boy, Damien Nightshayde, a possible vampire. Damien claims to be Chad's new bodyguard, giving Chad hope that Clint might be stopped. Jeremy becomes locked in a freezer. Weird Jimmy appears, claiming that Jeremy is the "key" to stopping "his plan". Jeremy falls unconscious when Chad finally enters the freezer.
7	"Sick Day"		8:42	August 5, 2010
Chad calls in sick with a cold. An attractive Empire Market employee, Michelle, stops by his place to give him soup. Jeremy—still yet to have recovered from his time in the freezer—is forced to run the store alone with Damien. Maggie mistakes Hal for an employee, making him manager-for-a-day. Hal uses his kung fu skills to "rescue" Baby Cookie from Randy. Despite being defeated, however, Randy claims that "the plan is already in motion", revealing several Baby Cookie duplicates he has planted in the employee locker room.
8	"The Improvised"		6:58	September 16, 2010
In this episode (where all the actors improvise their lines), Clint's father comes to manage for a day at Empire Market, however, Maggie despises him and forces him to leave after a day. Meanwhile, Chad is falling in love with Michelle. Clint doesn't appear in this episode. Randy begins to put his plan into motion. No one knows what it is, but at the end, a baby doll appears to be a timebomb in one of the aisles of empire market.
9	"Duel to the Death"		4:25	October 7, 2010
It is finally Chad's turn to be manager-for-a-day although Maggie has decided that the best manager is Clint. To compensate, Chad goes to challenge Clint for a duel to death and they duel from the back room to the front one. Soon, Chad surrenders and Jeremy and Damien throw a small net at Clint. Clint is irritated. However, a worse thing is that Jeremy found a Baby Cookie Bomb behind the shelf...and the count is 6 minutes.
10	"Six Ways To Die"		10:43	November 6, 2010
A crazed Randy reveals that he has placed five Baby Cookie bombs inside the store. Jeremy and Damien pursue Randy while Chad and Clint find and defuse most of the bombs. Meanwhile, Jeremy encounters Weird Jimmy, who tells him that the last bomb is inside the Surveillance Assailant. Jeremy decides to take the Assailant out of the store to sacrifice himself, but Damien grabs the device and lets it explode in the parking lot, dying in the process. Champion relieves Maggie of her managing duties and buys Empire Market back from Red Leader Foods. He also holds an award ceremony where Jeremy is given a commendation and Chad is promoted to general manager; a mentally unbalanced Maggie is demoted to night shift manager, but vows to return. Chad tries to promote Jeremy to day shift manager, but Jeremy—feeling guilty over the deaths of Weird Jimmy and Damien—instead embarks on a journey of self discovery. Michelle assures Chad that Jeremy will return. They set out on a date.

=== Season 4 (2012) ===
No.	Title	Link	Length	Original release date
1	"The Return of Weird Jimmy"		4:36	June 19, 2012
Chad Vader is the General Manager of a newly remodeled Empire Market. Maggie, demoted to the night shift in the last season, has predictably gone insane. Chad meets the late Weird Jimmy's brother, Johnny, who has arrived to pick up his belongings. Johnny reminisces about Jimmy, not knowing his ghost is in the room. Upon hearing Johnny's comment that he could have saved him, Jimmy replies that he has a feeling they're gonna be getting a lot closer before lunging at him.
2	"The Possession of Weird Jimmy"		3:55	June 26, 2012
After running through the store, Johnny sees Jimmy in a mirror. Not wanting to be a ghost anymore, Jimmy possesses his brother in order to clean the aisles of Empire Market. Later, Chad comes across a screaming Lloyd, who claims to have seen Weird Jimmy. Chad assumes it is Johnny until Jimmy reveals himself. Despite his actions, Chad is happy to welcome Weird Jimmy back to the store. Everything seems fine until Jeremy stumbles into the store, all tattered, asking for help.
3	"Commander Wickstrom's Journey"		3:58	July 2, 2012
As he recovers in the back room, Jeremy reveals to Chad that after he left the store, he played The Elder Scrolls V: Skyrim for three days without food or sleep. While scavenging for food, Ben the Ghost appeared and told Jeremy that his destiny was at Chad's side. Chad sends Jeremy off to work. It's then revealed that Chad actually paid Ben $50 to tell Jeremy to come back. Ben reveals that Jeremy's real destiny lies in college, but Chad makes him leave. Chad then says that absolute power corrupting people is a myth, and sets off to do his job.
4	"The Return Of Brian"		4:28	July 10, 2012
Chad and the Empire Market staff are celebrate his birthday. Chad says he had no idea that the staff was planning it, but Jeremy explains that it was his idea and that he made everyone go along with it. Chad tells a highly embellished story about his job interview with Randy. Just then, actor Brian Krause of the series Charmed — who worked at Empire Market before stardom and witnessed Chad's interview — reveals the truth and explains that Chad had been a Day Shift Manager at Olive Garden. Brian threatens to reveal more of Chad's secrets.
5	"Convicted Criminal"		5:45	July 17, 2012
Brian continues telling embarrassing stories about Chad's past, like when he literally punched the clock to pieces when he first started work; it is revealed that Chad and Clint became enemies when Chad blamed Clint, who helped him clean up the mess, for the mishap. Seeing Brian as a threat to his pride and authority, Chad decides that he must become a fearless overlord to better run the store. He then sets off to find the one person who could help him accomplish that.
6	"Vader VS Vader"		5:40	November 20, 2012
Chad returns to the basement, confronting and defeating his "dark soul half." He then makes up a set of new oppressive rules. Meanwhile, Jeremy and Weird Jimmy talk about Jeremy's constant conflicts with Chad and problems with the generator; Jimmy asks Jeremy to tell him when the next lightsaber battle occurs so he can take the night off. The two then notice a reactor failure somewhere that once happened to Jimmy previously. Maggie manipulates Chad to making her his new apprentice and Day Shift Manager. Maggie dons Jeremy's helmet and Jeremy is forced to become Night Shift Manager.
7	"Chad Vader Makes Me Cry"		4:44	November 27, 2012
Chad is persuaded by Maggie to fire Andy. Instead, Chad makes him wear a horse mask. Later, Andy sings a song called "Chad Vader Makes me Wanna Cry" and Chad fires Andy as a result. Andy accepts a record deal, still wearing the horse mask, and leaves soon after. Chad takes Michelle to meet someone.
8	"Surprise Inspection"		8:40	December 4, 2012
Champion J. Pepper comes for a surprise inspection and sees the store in chaos. Hiding behind shelves, he sees Chad act rude to a customer, homeless people living in aisles, and the disgruntling the employees. Jeremy tells Chad about the generator problems as they get worse, yet Chad disregards his worries. It is revealed that Chad introduced Michelle to Libby, who is now married. The event disgusts Michelle and she breaks up with Chad. The generator gets worse and Pepper hastily leaves.
9	"Martial Law"		4:58	December 11, 2012
Chad declares martial law in Empire Market, placing Stormtroopers around the store and ordering the employees to work indefinite overtime to the point where Weird Jimmy recommends suicide. Maggie is promoted to his second-in-command. Chad himself lazily spends time in his "lounge", reminiscent of Jabba's Palace, watching Weird Jimmy dance. Fed up with what is happening, Michelle shoots a Stormtrooper and quits Empire Market. Electric bolts shoot around the failing generator.
10	"Chad Vader Dies"		10:07	December 18, 2012
Chad remains unwilling to deal with the generator. Jeremy and Jimmy team up and work on it, but get caught by Chad and Maggie. Jeremy can't fix the generator, and Chad thinks that Jeremy is incompetent. Unfortunately, Chad is electrocuted while trying to fix the generator himself and has a near death experience. Chad hallucinates and sees his younger self and a dog playing in a field. As he begins to walk away with the boy, he is brought back by Hal Thompson, who presses random buttons on Chad's suit. After it is revealed that Maggie sabotaged the generator for her own purposes, she throws Jeremy's helmet into the trash and escapes. Once a humbled Chad recovers, he has a staff meeting during which he gives all employees raises and promotions. In addition, Chad steps down from the General Manager position and promotes Jeremy to the position. The camera then pans out to reveal a supposed George Lucas directing the scene.
