= Entertainment Earth =

Collectible retailer and wholesaler

- Company type: Private
- Industry: Toys and Collectibles
- Founded: 1996
- Founder: Jason and Aaron Labowitz
- Headquarters: Simi Valley, California, United States
- Key people: John Louie (CEO)
- Products: toys prop replicas collectibles bobble heads action figures
- Divisions: Entertainment Earth; EE Distribution
- Website: EntertainmentEarth.com; EEDistribution.com

Entertainment Earth is an online retailer and wholesaler of licensed collectibles, including action figures, clothing, statues, prop replicas, games, vinyl figures, dolls, and toys.

== History ==
The company was founded in the San Fernando Valley of Los Angeles in 1995 by brothers Aaron and Jason Labowitz. They initially offered Star Wars action figures with the aim of attracting customers who were collectors who sought mint-condition items, as well as rarer items that might be difficult to find in stores. On April 1, 1996, the company launched its e-commerce site.

Over the years it has become one of the Internet's largest collectibles retailers, and it also sells general interest toys. It offers over 31,000 licensed products, including toys, gift items, collectibles, and memorabilia. In addition, Entertainment Earth designs and manufactures its own branded lines of merchandise. From 2008 through 2011, Inc.com named it one of the 5,000 fastest growing private retail companies in the United States.

In 2024, Entertainment Earth announced the construction of a new 209,000-square-foot facility in Simi Valley to expand its warehousing and distribution capabilities.

John Louie became the CEO of Entertainment Earth in 2026.

Entertainment Earth has both a retail and a wholesale division, as well as an affiliate program. Its print catalog is produced quarterly. Through its wholesale division, EE Distribution, the company sells to smaller retailers and distributors throughout the world in bulk. It is a Premier Hasbro Distributor in the United States and the exclusive distributor of toys manufactured by Bif Bang Pow!
