= Fellowship! =

- The cast of Fellowship!
- Music: Allen Simpson
- Lyrics: Brian D. Bradley, Lisa Fredrickson, Kelly Holden-Bashar, Joel McCrary, Edi Patterson, Steve Purnick, Cory Rouse, Allen Simpson, Ryan Smith, Peter Allen Vogt and Matthew Stephen Young
- Book: Kelly Holden-Bashar; Joel McCrary
- Basis: J. R. R. Tolkien's novel The Lord of the Rings: The Fellowship of the Ring and Peter Jackson's film The Lord of the Rings: The Fellowship of the Ring
- Productions: 2004 North Hollywood, California; 2005 Hollywood, California; 2005 San Diego Comic-Con; 2009 Burbank, California; 2010 New York, New York; 2014 Fort Worth, Texas; 2019 Fullerton, California; 2019 Dunkirk, Indiana; 2023 Muncie, Indiana

Fellowship! is a musical parody stage play based on The Fellowship of the Ring (the first volume of J. R. R. Tolkien's The Lord of the Rings) and Peter Jackson's 2001 film adaptation of it. The book was written by Kelly Holden-Bashar and Joel McCrary with music by Allen Simpson. Lyrics and additional material by Brian D. Bradley, Lisa Fredrickson, Kelly Holden-Bashar, Joel McCrary, Edi Patterson, Steve Purnick, Cory Rouse, Allen Simpson, Ryan Smith, Peter Allen Vogt and Matthew Stephen Young (the original cast). The musical was first performed at the El Portal Forum Theater in North Hollywood, California.

== Synopsis ==
The play follows the major events of the first part of Tolkien's story and the first of Peter Jackson's movies. It re-imagines Bilbo Baggins as an aged Catskill Jewish man, the Balrog as a sleep-deprived, lounge-singing diva, the battle on Weathertop as a West Side Story-style gang fight, and Rivendell as a Scientologist stronghold (primarily due to the similarity of names between 'Elrond' and 'L. Ron' Hubbard). Part live action, part puppet show and part animation, the show removes or summarizes parts of the story that would slow it down. While played for laughs, the music features original compositions instead of parodies, and the song styles range from cheesy 1980s rock to sleazy cabaret numbers.

== Productions ==
The play had a successful six-week run in early 2005 at the El Portal Forum Theater in North Hollywood, California, and played several sold-out shows at the 2005 San Diego Comic-Con. L.A. Weekly named it a "Pick of the Week", and both Backstage West and the Los Angeles Times listed it as a "Critic's Choice."

The show was produced several other times with the original cast and crew, most notably at the Falcon Theater in Burbank, California, in 2009 and at the New York Musical Theatre Festival in 2010.

In 2014, a different cast under the direction of Lyle Kanouse performed the play at the Circle Theatre in Fort Worth. They had a successful six week run with favorable reviews from critics in the Dallas/Fort Worth area. The Fort Worth run was so well-received, the show was remounted on the downstairs' stage at Theatre3 in Dallas, Theatre Too!. It was the most successful run in that space since the same theater's presentation of Avenue Q.

The Maverick Theater in Fullerton, California produced a well-received run of the show in June of 2019, and Slim Fisher Studios produced six performances in Dunkirk, Indiana, later the same year.

Fellowship! had a sold out, successful run at the Muncie Civic Theatre in Muncie, Indiana in June of 2023.

== Awards and nominations ==
In 2005, the play won Musical of the Year and Best Comedy Ensemble at the 2005 LA Weekly Theater Awards. The show was also nominated for Best Musical Direction.

At the 36th Annual Saturn Awards, held on June 24, 2010, in Burbank, California, the play won the award for Best Local Stage Production: Small Theatre. It was the first time an award in this category had ever been given at the Saturn Awards. Composer Allen Simpson and co-writers Matt Young and Ryan Smith (also cast members) accepted the award on behalf of the play. The award was presented by actor John de Lancie.

The 2014 Circle Theatre production brought home four awards at the 16th annual COLUMN AWARDS for excellence in Dallas/Ft. Worth Theatre: BEST MUSICAL (equity,) BEST SUPPORTING ACTOR went to Ben Philips for his portrayal of Gandalf/Galadriel, Kristin Spires won BEST MUSICAL DIRECTION, and composer Allen Simpson won BEST SOUND DESIGN OF A MUSICAL.
