= Sideshow Collectibles =

American collectible manufacturer

Sideshow Inc.
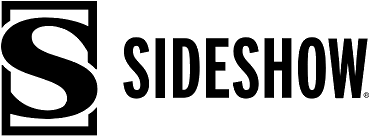
- Type: Private
- Industry: Collectibles,Entertainment
- Founded: 1994; 32 years ago
- Headquarters: Thousand Oaks, California, U.S.
- Area served: Worldwide
- Products: Licensed collectible figures, statues, fine art prints, and prop replicas based on properties including Star Wars, Marvel Comics, and DC Comics; exclusive distributor of Hot Toys figures in the Americas, Europe, and Australia.
- Brands: Court of the Dead, Sideshow
- Website: sideshow.com

Sideshow Collectibles is an American specialty manufacturer and seller of movie, film, and television collectible action figures and figurines.

Sideshow has a location Thousand Oaks, California.

== History ==
Sideshow, Inc. was established in 1994 as an artist collective in Southern California. The founders had backgrounds in business, graphic design, and film production design and practical effects.

In its early years, the company operated as a freelance prototype studio, creating toy designs for major manufacturers as well as stop motion animation puppets for arcade game productions such as Atari's Primal Rage.

In 1999, Sideshow shifted from prototype and mode kit work to producing and marketing its own line of collectible products, launching with an officially licensed 8" action figure series sold through Toys "R" Us.

Later in 1999 and into the early 2000s, the company began its rebrand from "Sideshow Toy" to "Sideshow Collectibles" and expanded its figural work into collectible statues, busts, and replicas.

Sideshow is currently headquartered in Thousand Oaks, California.

== Production ==
Sideshow manufactures or distributes officially licensed collectible figures, statues, prop replicas and art prints drawn primarily from film, television, comic books, anime, and video games.

Collectibles are produced across a wide range of formats, most popularly including articulated 1:6 scale action figures, often including tailored costuming, swap-out accessories, and occasionally die-cast elements.

Sideshow's 1:4 scale statues line was introduced in 2004 with a series of Star Wars collectibles and has evolved over the years with developments in fabric costuming, light-up elements, and swap-out accessories.

Other formats produced include busts, Legendary Scale Figures designed at 1:2 scale, life-size figures, and other non-scale artist series pieces.

Sideshow also produces officially licensed, limited-edition fine art prints.

=== Film Licenses ===
- Friday the 13th
- Ghost Rider
- Indiana Jones and the Kingdom of the Crystal Skull
- Jaws
- Jurassic Park
- Terminator 2: Judgment Day
- Terminator Salvation
- Tremors
- Tron: Evolution
- Monty Python and the Holy Grail
- Monty Python's Life of Brian

=== DC Comics ===
- Poison Ivy

=== Marvel Comics ===
- The Hulk
- Iron Man
- Mary Jane Watson
- Psylocke
- The Thing
- Thor
- Ultron
- Venom
- Wolverine

=== Television ===
- Buffy the Vampire Slayer
- Get Smart
- Hogan's Heroes
- The Simpsons
- The Twilight Zone

=== Video games ===
- Diablo III
- Uncharted 3: Drake's Deception
- World of Warcraft

== See also ==
- Iron Studios
- Funko
