= Gorgeous Tiny Chicken Machine Show =

- Genre: Comedy; Talk show Parody
- Created by: Kim Evey and Greg Benson
- Presented by: Mediocre Films
- Starring: Kim Evey, Payman Benz, Michele Gregory, & Julie Wittner
- Theme music composer: Chris Jeffries
- Opening theme: "Gorgeous Tiny Chicken Machine Show" written by Chris Jeffries
- Ending theme: Performed by The Arigatones (season 1) Various (season 2)
- Country of origin: United States
- Original language: English
- No. of seasons: 2
- No. of episodes: 21

Production
- Producer: Pogo Saito
- Running time: approx. 4 minutes per episode

Original release
- Network: YouTube, Crackle
- Release: February 25, 2007

Gorgeous Tiny Chicken Machine Show is a comedy talk show parody web series starring a Japanese character called Kiko. The video series debuted on YouTube in 2007 and was created by husband-and-wife team Greg Benson and Kim Evey's production company, Mediocre Films. In spring 2008, a distribution deal with Sony Pictures resulted in 10 new episodes to premiere weekly on the company's C-Spot YouTube channel and its Crackle web video site. A second season premiered on C-Spot's channel on September 19, 2008.

== History ==
=== Independent episodes ===
Originally developed for a live improv venue, the show's first online episode was uploaded to YouTube on February 25, 2007. It was featured on the site, and quickly rose to viral video status. As of May 28, 2007, it had over 1.4 million views on YouTube and had been featured on a wide variety of other sites. The episode was screened at the FanTasia Festival on July 20, 2007, marking its Canadian premiere on screen.

David Spade took particular interest in the fledgling series, promoting it on his show, The Showbiz Show with David Spade. Pairing with Mediocre Films, they created an episode specifically for his show in which one of his co-workers is a guest on Kiko's show.

A second episode was uploaded on YouTube, but shortly taken off the site by the producers. A vlog by Benson was quickly posted stating that new episodes would be coming, and negotiations were being made about the fate of the show. On May 10, 2007, a Kiko music video excerpted from the original episode two and titled "JUICY!" was posted.

After considerable delays, a revised second episode was uploaded to YouTube on May 29, 2007. This episode was chosen as "YouTube Star of the Moment" by viewers of the Attack of the Show! program on G4 for the week ending June 10, 2007; host Kevin Pereira described the show as "a cross between Letterman, Pee-Wee Herman, Steve Irwin, Emeril, and a Japanese schoolgirl on meth."

=== Sony episodes ===
After a long hiatus, a third episode was finally uploaded to YouTube on March 28, 2008, in conjunction with the show's debut as part of C-Spot and Crackle. It was announced at that time that C-Spot would release 10 episodes, coming out on successive Fridays as part of an original-programming lineup of six programs. The fourth episode, featuring pornographic actor Ron Jeremy, drew increased media attention around its April 4, 2008, debut, with Los Angeles Times' Web Scout article titled "Sony's C-Spot: New Web comedy lineup surprisingly clean despite Ron Jeremy cameo."

Monsters and Critics reported that same week that the series would be available on C-Spot via several channels of distributions, including AOL Video, Hulu, YouTube and Crackle, as well as through Verizon's V Cast and directly to Sony's Bravia televisions. The same story indicated that additional episodes would have guest appearances by writer-actor Wil Wheaton, actor-director Adam Arkin, and actor-director Michael O'Keefe; Arkin's episode — in which he played a bewildered mycologist — was made available April 25, at which time C-Spot announced that Wheaton would appear in the May 16 episode. Wheaton would instead end up on the May 30th episode.

== Format ==
Episodes follow a fairly standard format: The episode begins with the theme song followed by Kiko introducing herself as the host and introducing the guest ("please for you to crap hands and cheering for..."), mispronouncing their name in an off-color fashion, and then bringing the guest star out from a side curtain. The guest attempts to correct Kiko's pronunciation, but Kiko continues mispronouncing the guest's name throughout the show (and subtitles reflect the mispronunciation, not the correct name).

Kiko usually leads the guests through a series of zany activities (which usually make the guest rather uncomfortable), which are usually interrupted by Kiko announcing, "Now it's time to spin the Wheel of Fun!" Kiko spins a wheel of a chicken, and when it lands on a space (containing unspecified Japanese characters) pointed to by the chicken's beak, she indicates yet another zany activity for the characters to participate in.

The show ends with the guest star appearing very uncomfortable/confused and Kiko announcing the end of the show as the credits roll.

== Recurring characters ==
Kiko is played by Evey, who also writes the series. While the character is Japanese, Evey was born in South Korea and grew up in the United States.

Additional regular characters include UniCow (Payment Benz) and Cownicorn (Sean Becker), hybrid cow-unicorns; Panda (Michele Gregory), and Go-Go Dancer (Julie Wittner), who do not speak (though Go-Go Dancer can sing). Guest Rick Pope (Ryan Smith) — which Kiko mispronounces as "Lick Poop," a mispronunciation that is transcribed on-screen — appeared in episodes 1, 4, 5, 13, 16, 18, and 22; several follow-up videos from Mediocre Films and distributed on C-Spot's YouTube channel are part of a series titled "Lick Poop's Video Diary", which purports to be Rick Pope's private vlog, stolen, edited, and uploaded by UniCow.

== Uses in other media ==
- The "Juicy!" song was used in an explicit shock site "I love the fishes."
