= Ryan Smith (writer) =

American screenwriter and actor

Ryan Smith is an American screenwriter and actor. He wrote 19 episodes of television's MADtv in the 2006-2007 season. As an actor, he made guest appearances on the program Yes, Dear and in the Mediocre Films shorts Mating Season (2005) and Gorgeous Tiny Chicken Machine Show (2007). In June 2008, Smith appeared in the web series Comedy Gumbo on Crackle.
