= Greg Benson =

American comedian, actor, and director

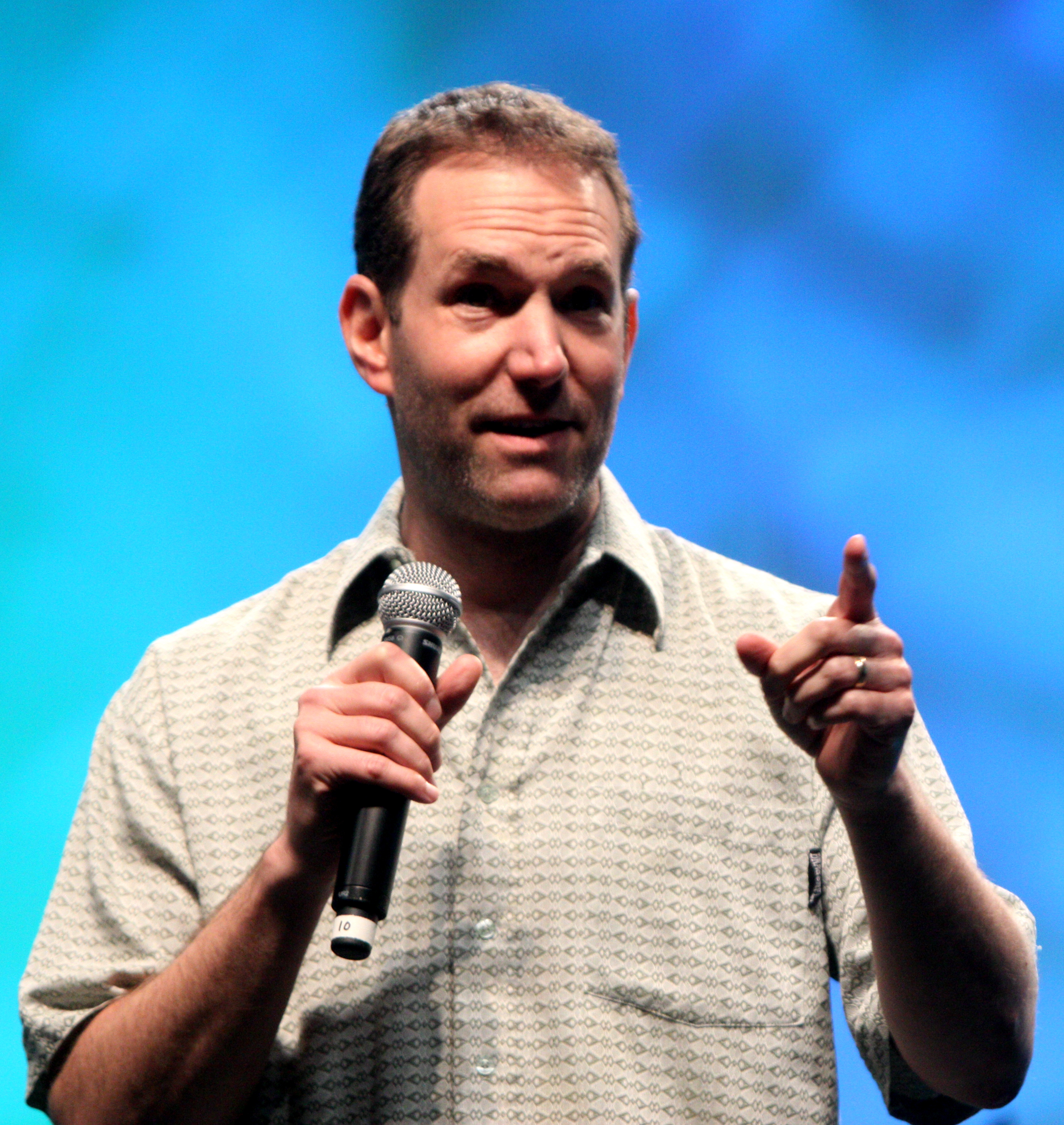
- Benson at VidCon 2012
- Born: 1967/8; Dallas, Texas, U.S.
- Notable work: Gorgeous Tiny Chicken Machine Show, The Guild
- Spouse(s): Paige Davis (m. 1994; div. 1995) Kim Evey
- Children: 1

Comedy career
- Years active: 1990–present

YouTube information
- Channel: MediocreFilms
- Years active: 2006–present
- Genres: Comedy; pranks; entertainment
- Subscribers: 1.68 million
- Views: 403.3 million
- Last updated: January 2, 2026
- Website: mediocrefilms.com

Gregory Benson (born January 23, 1967/68) is an American comedian, actor, Twitch streamer and director. His production company, Mediocre Films, creates comedic short films, generally for YouTube. He is a frequent director for The Guild.

== History ==
Benson grew up in Dallas, Texas. He moved to California, where he has since appeared in several television commercials. Benson is a sometime member of the ACME Comedy Theatre improv troupe in Hollywood, where he first worked with writer/actor Wil Wheaton, who has since appeared in a variety of Benson's projects.

He started making videos in 2005, initially hosting them on his own Mediocre Films website. Eventually he moved his distribution from his own site to YouTube, where within one month, "Greg Hits Hollywood", one of his shorts, was featured on the site's home page. The video and its sequels feature Benson interviewing strangers as a pretext for hitting them with his microphone to see "what people will put up with just because they want to be on TV, or even just YouTube." Since then, he has become a popular YouTube comedian, number 47 on the list of most subscribed comedians on YouTube. His most popular video as of early 2009 was episode 1 of the Gorgeous Tiny Chicken Machine Show, which was selected to be featured on YouTube shortly after being posted February 25, 2007, and subsequently drew nearly 2 million viewers. The series later was picked up by Sony Pictures, who continued the show through two seasons on YouTube as part of its "C Spot" lineup; one reviewer for The Times of London described it as "Pee-Wee Herman meets Monty Python via the hyperkinetic madness of Japanese television."

Benson's most prominent directing credit is his work on the Internet series The Guild, on which he worked again with his wife, Kim Evey, producer of The Guild, as well as creator and performer of the Gorgeous Tiny Chicken Machine Show. He also portrayed one of the passengers on the short Docudrama "The Flight that Fought Back". He and his wife, Kim, adopted a baby boy named Charlie in January 2016.

== Awards ==
His first video, "Coming Home", was chosen by Amazon.com customers as one of the top five videos of the Amazon/Tribeca Film Festival's short films division.

His short "Phone Call to God" was chosen for second place in the best comedy division at the 2006 Evil City Film Fest.

"The Guild", which Benson Directed the second half of season 1, has won several awards including 2007 YouTube Awards (Best Series), 2009 Streamy Awards (Best Series, Best Comedy Series), 2012 IAWTV Awards (Best Comedy Web Series).

== Retarded Policeman ==
Retarded Policeman is an American YouTube comedy web series written, directed, and edited by Benson, and based on an idea by his wife, producer and performer, Kim Evey. Scott Perry, Josh "The Ponceman" Perry's brother, has worked on the series.

The videos were uploaded on YouTube under the channel MediocreFilms, later made private at an unknown date.

=== Synopsis ===
The fictional series follows learning impaired Officer Ponce (Josh "The Ponceman" Perry) as he pulls over members of the public.

=== Theme song ===
The following is the lyrics to the 8 second long theme song played at the start of the video. Episode 15 had a rock remix of the theme song performed by Dave Days.

He is a cop,

And he's learning impaired,

He's the retarded policeman! (that's me!)

=== Episode list ===
==== Season 1 ====
# Episode no.	Episode name	Guest starring	Air date
1	Hi	Scott Perry and Stacey Perry	September 19, 2007
2	Officer Monkey	Kim Evey	September 27, 2007
3	Coked Up	Greg Benson	October 4, 2007
4	Racial Profiling	Cozmo Johnson	November 20, 2007
5	Writers Strike	Wil Wheaton	January 22, 2008
6	Sobriety Test	David Hussey	February 4, 2008
7	MILF	Cory Williams and Jody Hoells	March 20, 2008
7.5	Fish (April Fools)	Felicia Day	March 31, 2008
8	Tazer	Mark McCracken and Laura House	April 1, 2008
9	Boobies!	Heather Provost, Valerie Querns, Alan Heitz and Scott Perry	April 23, 2008
10	Mexicans	Connie Perry and Al Perry	June 10, 2008
11	GILF	Peggy Grigsby	June 25, 2008
12	Casual Friday	Shelby Malone	July 2, 2008
13	Mime	Doug Jones	July 10, 2008
14	Bribes	Phil DeFranco	July 25, 2008
15	Assburgers Syndrome	Charles Trippy and Dave Days	August 8, 2008
16	Stalker	Michael Buckley	August 15, 2008
17	Nalts	Kevin Nalty	August 29, 2008
18	Underage Girls	Rain Echo Scott, Rina Beyda, TJ Sonnier	September 5, 2008
19	Chad Vader	Matt Sloan and Aaron Yonda	October 17, 2008
20	Lesbian Bikini Wrestling	Michelle Beyda Scott, Veronika Olah, Amber Smyser	November 24, 2010
21	Lt. Ballsack	Greg Benson	November 14, 2008

1.Initially a DVD-exclusive.

==== Season 2 ====
# Episode no.	Episode name	Guest starring	Air date
22	Bitches	Kathleen Victoria Elliott and Tonilyn Hornung	January 5, 2012
23	Pepper Spray	Bob Bendick	January 12, 2012
24	Foursquare	Kassem G	January 19, 2012
25	Sexual Harassment	Abigail Grace Tallman	February 1, 2012
26	Invisible Driver	Lindsey Koens	February 9, 2012
27	Panty Inspector	Allison Scagliotti and J.P. Manoux	February 16, 2012
28	Donuts	Sandeep Parikh	Unknown
29	Gun Fight	Shay Carl	March 8, 2012
30	New Friend	Jesse Mackey	March 15, 2012
31	Framed for Murder	DeStorm Power	April 5, 2012
32	Child Driver	Mackenzie Hillhouse	April 12, 2012
33	Blonde in a Convertible	Teal Sherer	April 19, 2012
34	FART	Toby Turner	May 10, 2012
35	Politically Correct Episode	Brittani Louise Taylor	May 25, 2012
36	Oh Look! A Foreigner!	Miles Grose	June 7, 2012

2.Reuploaded on September 20, 2012.
