= Willy Street Cooperative =

Co-op grocery store in Madison, Wisconsin

Coordinates: 43°5′1.68″N 89°21′47.79″W

Willy Street Grocery Cooperative (Willy Street Co-op)

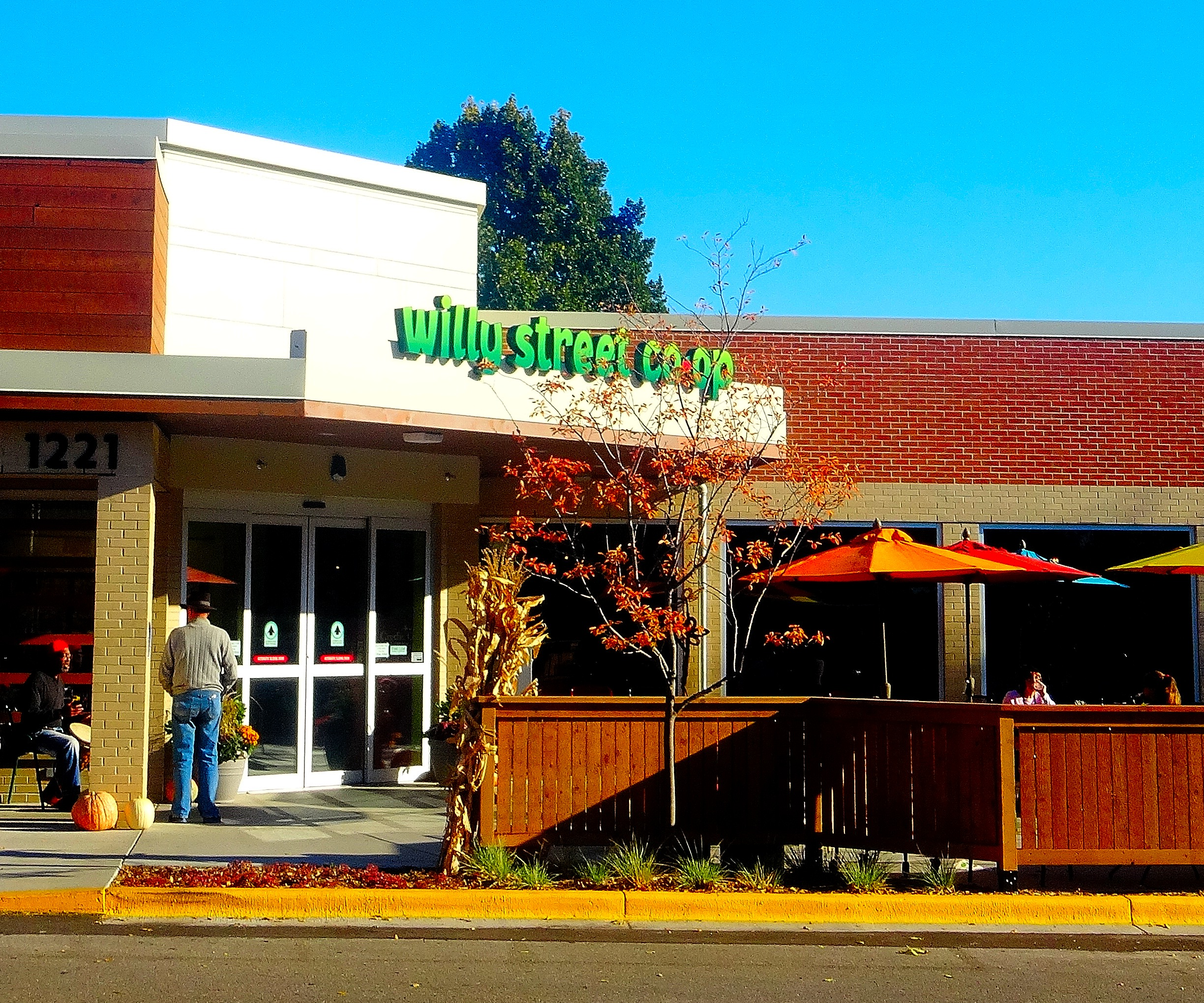
- Type: Consumers' Cooperative
- Industry: Retailing
- Founded: 1974
- Headquarters: Madison, Wisconsin, United States
- Products: Organic food
- Members: 28,000
- Website: willystreet.coop

The Willy Street Cooperative (locally known as the Willy Street Co-op) is a food cooperative located in Madison, Wisconsin that specializes in natural, organic and locally produced foods. The co-op offers products from over 180 local farmers and vendors. The cooperative is owned by over 33,000 equity-owning members.

The co-op is an economically and environmentally sustainable, cooperatively owned grocery business that serves the needs of its owners and employees. WSGC supports local and organic suppliers throughout south-central Wisconsin. It operates according to seven basic principles, sometimes known as the Rochdale Principles. The cooperative has assisted struggling cooperatives such as the Yahara River Grocery Cooperative in Stoughton.

== History ==
The Williamson Street Grocery Co-op opened in 1974 at 1101 Williamson Street, sharing the space with the workers cooperative Nature's Bakery. The co-op relocated to 1014 Williamson Street in October 1974. They outgrew the space and relocated again in October 1977 to 1202 Williamson Street. A board of directors was elected from the membership in 1979. Originally managed as a collective, the staff was restructured in 1982 and a general manager was hired.

Willy Street Co-op grew over the next two decades; then, in 1998, the co-op purchased and remodeled the Eagles Club at 1221 Williamson Street. After years of planning and selecting two sites that didn't work out, the cooperative opened a second store, dubbed "Willy West," at 6825 University Avenue in Middleton in November 2010. Willy Street Co-op opened their third store, Willy North, located at 2817 North Sherman Avenue, in August 2016.

Scenes from the comedy series Chad Vader: Day Shift Manager were filmed on location at the Willy Street Co-op, which serves as "Empire Market," the primary location for the series.

== See also ==
- List of food cooperatives
