= Bif Bang Pow! =

American Toy Company

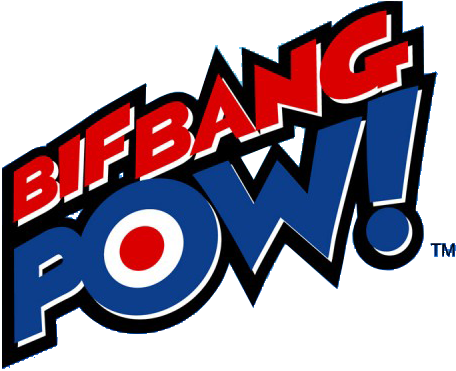
- Company type: Private
- Industry: Entertainment
- Founded: 2005; 21 years ago
- Founder: Jason Labowitz and Jason Lenzi
- Headquarters: Simi Valley, CA, U.S.
- Products: Action figures, bobbleheads, prop replicas
- Website: bifbangpow.com

Bif Bang Pow! is a manufacturing company established in 2005 by Jason Labowitz and Jason Lenzi. The company produces action figures, bobbleheads , prop replicas, journals, barware, drinkware, coasters, license plate frames, and tin totes based on licensed properties.

The company's product line includes Mego-style retro action figures, plastic figures, free-standing bobbleheads, and Monitor Mate mini-bobbleheads, primarily targeting fans of science fiction and fantasy genres.

Bif Bang Pow has merchandise licensed from: Marvel Comics, DC Comics, Flash Gordon, KISS, Penny Dreadful, Mike Tyson Mysteries, The Big Bang Theory, Star Trek, The Venture Bros, Dexter (TV series), Twin Peaks, and The Twilight Zone. Notable contributors include artist Alex Ross, who worked on the Flash Gordon action figure design.
