= Chad Vader: Day Shift Manager =

American web series

- Promotional Image
- Genre: Sitcom
- Created by: Aaron Yonda; Matt Sloan
- Developed by: Aaron Yonda; Matt Sloan
- Directed by: Aaron Yonda; Matt Sloan
- Presented by: Aaron Yonda
- Starring: Aaron Yonda; Matt Sloan; Brad Knight; Christina LaVicka; Paul Guse; Craig Johnson; Rob Matsushita
- Voices of: Matt Sloan
- Narrated by: Matt Sloan
- Theme music composer: John Williams
- Opening theme: The Imperial March
- Ending theme: The Imperial March
- Composers: Andrew Yonda; John Lee
- Country of origin: United States
- Original language: English
- No. of seasons: 4
- No. of episodes: 38 (list of episodes)

Production
- Executive producer: Matt Sloan
- Producer: Courtney Collins
- Production locations: Madison, Wisconsin
- Editors: Matt Sloan; Aaron Yonda
- Camera setup: Tona Williams
- Running time: 4–11 minutes
- Production company: Blame Society Productions

Original release
- Network: Channel 101; Blip; YouTube; Ustream; Hulu
- Release: July 10, 2006 – December 18, 2012

Related
- Star Wars

Chad Vader: Day Shift Manager is an American fan web sitcom created by Aaron Yonda and Matt Sloan, who wrote, directed, and appeared in the series, which parodies Star Wars. The show's central character is Chad Vader, the day-shift manager at the fictional supermarket Empire Market, who clashes with his customers and employees.

== Production ==
The original idea for the character of Chad Vader came from Yonda's friend, stand-up comedian Tim Harmston. Initially produced for Channel 101, the project was canceled after only two episodes were released. However, Yonda and Sloan decided to continue the story and the project achieved significant popularity following its airing on YouTube. It is largely filmed in Madison, Wisconsin, at Willy Street Cooperative. The show has received several awards, including an Official Star Wars Fan Film Award.

Following the end of Season 4, Aaron Yonda has confirmed no further seasons are planned, due to the expense of the production and his and Matt Sloan's frustration about not being able to pay their actors for their time. Characters from the series continue to make appearances in Blame Society Film productions, especially Chad and Hal Thompson.

In 2026, it was announced on Facebook that a special reunion episode is in development to commemorate the series' 20th anniversary.

=== Filming style and locations ===
The "Empire Market" scenes were filmed on location at Willy Street Co-op, Madison, Wisconsin.

== Series overview ==
The first season follows Chad and his interactions with his co-workers. He admires his boss Randy, acquires Jeremy as an apprentice, hazes Lloyd, and dates Clarissa. After troubles with Clint, Chad is moved to the night shift, where he meets Weird Jimmy, before quitting his job at Empire Market. After unsuccessfully working briefly at a number of jobs, he returns to Empire Market to re-ally with his coworkers and battle Clint to reclaim the day shift manager position.

In the second season, Empire Market is bought out by Red Leader Foods, a large corporation. Maggie McCall arrives as the corporate liaison for the new owners. After failure on the new laser checkout system, Randy is demoted to night shift manager, where he becomes mentally unstable, and Maggie becomes the acting general manager. The series also introduces another love interest for Chad, Maggie's assistant Libby, and a minor antagonist, Sean Banditson. The season focuses on Chad's misuse of Jeremy and Maggie's attempts to ally with Jeremy. Afterward, Jeremy and Chad duel, leading to the accidental death of Weird Jimmy. After the battle, Chad and Jeremy reconcile.

The third season begins with the trial promotion of employees to general manager for a day. After the employees' failures, Maggie trials Clint as manager-for-a-day, where he attempts to turn the store into a "bozo circus" as Chad describes it. New employee Damien Nightshayde joins Chad and Jeremy, whilst Weird Jimmy's ghost tells Jeremy a prophecy. Finally, during the day of Chad's management, Randy attempts to blow up the store, though only Damien is killed. As a result, previous store owner Champion J. Pepper (Clint's father) buys Empire Market back, promoting Chad the general manager, and demoting Maggie to night shift manager. Champion congratulates Chad for his bravery. Jeremy, still depressed over Damien's death, chooses to take a leave of absence to go on a spiritual journey of discovery. Chad wishes Jeremy good luck in his quest.

The fourth season opens up with Chad as the general manager of Empire Market. Weird Jimmy's brother Johnny enters the store to pick up his brother's belongings. When he reminisces about Jimmy, the latter possesses him, and ultimately becomes the janitor for the store again. Chad manipulates Jeremy to return with the hope of making the store "fully operational". Disturbed over the lack of faith his employees have in him, Chad becomes convinced that he must locate his "dark soul half" to become the manager that they deserve. He descends into madness and forces a tyrannical martial law on the store. Soon, a generator malfunction threatens its very existence. Chad sacrifices himself to neutralize the generator and save Empire Market. The generator shorts out his life support suit, sending him into a near-death experience, until the suit is unexpectedly rebooted by Hal Thompson. Chad then apologizes to everyone, and gives them promotions before demoting himself back to day shift manager, and Jeremy assumes the general manager position in his stead.

== Cast and characters ==
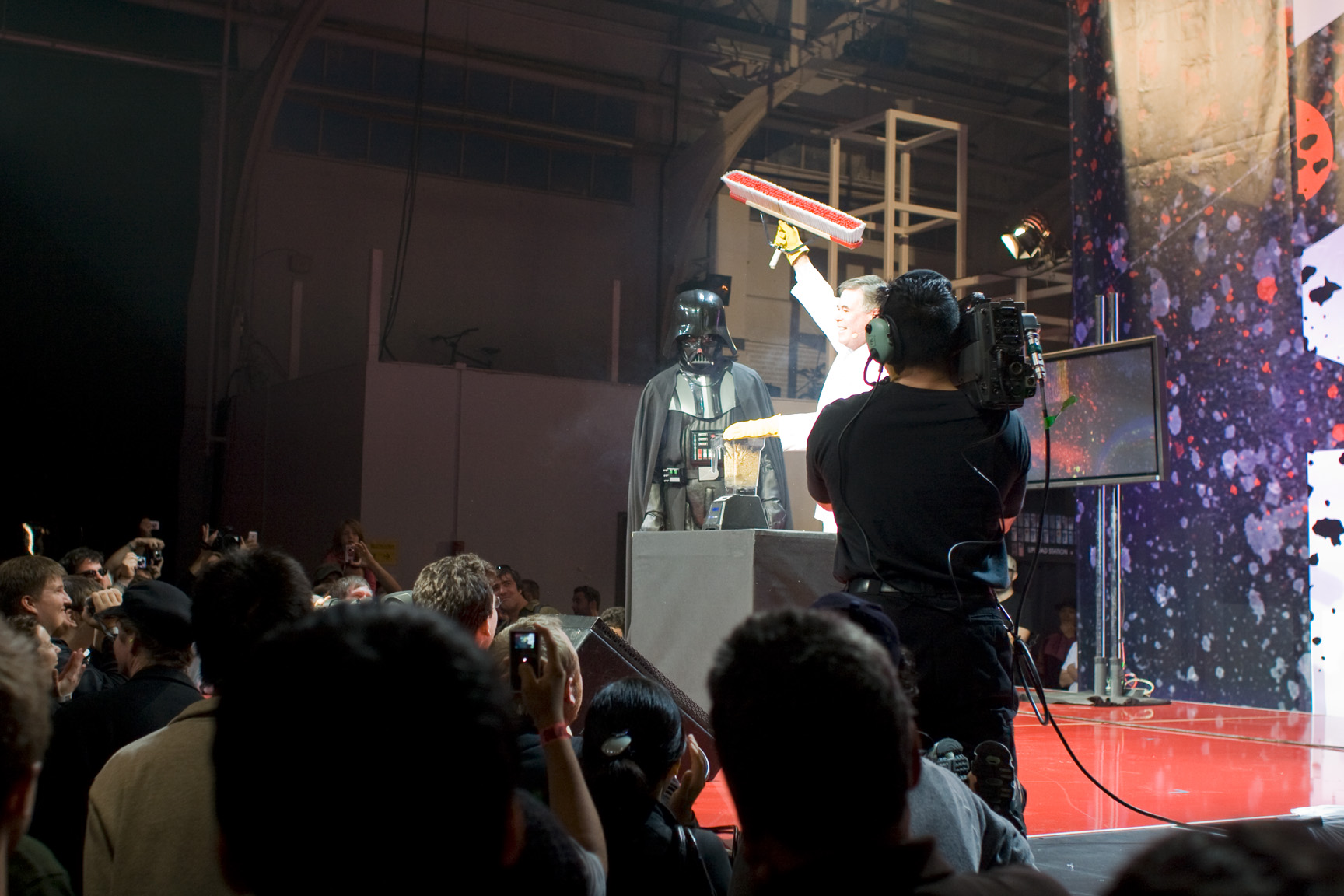
Yonda in character as Chad Vader at YouTube Live in 2008

Chad Vader (Aaron Yonda/voiced by Matt Sloan) is the show's central character. He is the day shift manager of Empire Market. Sometimes using lines lifted from the Star Wars films (the main source of humor being Chad going about day-to-day life while retaining a behavior befitting of a Sith lord), Chad's main goal is to crush Empire Market's competition and help the store dominate the food retailing industry. However, as season 2 progresses along, Chad follows Randy's orders to "ditch" the Star Wars attitude and become more normal. The new leader announces that everyone has a chance to be general manager. His main goal morphs into a great ambition to become General Manager (which he succeeds in doing the end of season 3). While he has inappropriate and rocky relationships with most of his co-workers, most notably Clint Shermer, he has better ones with others, such as Jeremy, whom he adopts as his apprentice. Chad implies in the second episode that he is Darth Vader's younger, less successful brother, and that Vader gave Chad a life support suit and helmet similar to his own after Chad accidentally rode his bicycle into a volcano. This fact is mentioned explicitly on the Blame Society website (www.blamesociety.net). Though he uses a red Sith lightsaber as a weapon to threaten opponents and shoplifters, he may not be a Sith; he is never referred to as "Darth", the title given to all members of the Sith order. He is, however, referred to as "Lord Vader" by some characters. Chad had lost touch with his family when they moved to Tatooine without him. LucasArts was impressed by Sloan, and this led to him becoming the new voice actor for Darth Vader. His voice appears in the games Empire at War: Forces of Corruption, Soulcalibur IV, and Star Wars: The Force Unleashed. It is also noted that in The Force Unleashed, if the player kills twelve Stormtroopers as Darth Vader during the introduction sequence, they will receive an achievement called "Worst Day Shift Manager Ever".

== Awards and honors ==
- Matt Sloan and Aaron Yonda were awarded the George Lucas Selects award for The Official Star Wars Fan Film Awards 2007, presented at Star Wars Celebration IV, for their work on Chad Vader. George Lucas personally selected the short movie as the best fan movie of the year. The annual competition is hosted by AtomFilms.
- Chad Vader appeared on the cover of Isthmus Magazine, January 25, 2007.
- Clips from episodes 1 and 4 appeared on the October 11, 2006, episode of ABC's Good Morning America.
- Matt Sloan was selected to be the voice of Darth Vader in the video games Soulcalibur IV, Star Wars: The Force Unleashed and its sequel, and in all Lego Star Wars works.

== Distribution ==
The first episode of Season 2 was released on the internet on February 1, 2009, and subsequent episodes have been periodically released. Season 3 started being released on the internet from early 2010.

It started being broadcast on Blip in April 2010.

The series also has a DVD, which contains all 8 of the first-season episodes, and one for season 2's ten episodes. Released on DVD in late 2008, Season 1.5 features the collection of "Chad Vader Training Videos" and other material created after the release of the Season 1 DVD. Chad Vader: Day Shift Manager has been translated into at least 6 languages, including Portuguese, Spanish, French, Chinese, Hebrew and Lingua Franca Nova.

== Other media ==
The titular character of Chad Vader: Day Shift Manager has appeared outside of the web series.

- Chad Vader appeared on YouTube Live on November 22, 2008.
- The character appeared as a guest riffer on Star Wars: Episode II – Attack of the Clones and The Empire Strikes Back for Michael J. Nelson's RiffTrax service. Nelson and fellow riffer Kevin Murphy also appeared in a special episode of the series.
- Chad also appeared in an episode of a YouTube series called "Retarded Policeman" starring alongside the eponymous learning impaired policeman.
- Chad also appeared in an episode of a YouTube series called "The Key of Awesome", alongside Amber Lee "Obama Girl" Ettinger.
- Chad Vader stars in a voter education YouTube video for Dane County, Wisconsin, which appeared March 17, 2014.

A spin-off web series, Empire Market Training Videos was produced in 2008. In the webisodes, Chad covers issues of customer satisfaction, custodial duties, the importance of the dress code, the perils of shoplifting and patrolling in a series of in-universe training videos teaching the potential employee of Empire Market. It retains many characters from the main series.
