= Star Wars: Empire at War =

2006 video game

- Developer: Petroglyph Games
- Publishers: LucasArts; Aspyr (Mac OS X)
- Director: Joseph Bostic
- Producer: Charles J. Kroegel Jr.
- Programmer: Michael Legg
- Artist: Gary Cox
- Writer: Adam P. Isgreen
- Composer: Frank Klepacki
- Series: Star Wars
- Engine: Alamo
- Platforms: Windows, Mac OS X
- Release: Windows: NA: February 16, 2006; EU: February 17, 2006; Mac OS X: NA: March 27, 2007; EU: April 27, 2007
- Genre: Real-time strategy
- Modes: Single-player, multiplayer

Star Wars: Empire at War is a 2006 real-time strategy video game developed by Petroglyph Games and published by LucasArts for Microsoft Windows and Mac OS X. Set between Episode III and Episode IV, it focuses on the fledgling struggle between the Empire and the Rebels. In October 2006, an expansion titled Star Wars: Empire at War: Forces of Corruption was released.

An active modding community exists for the game, and Petroglyph has provided updates for several years after its release.

== Gameplay ==
A screenshot presenting one of the Galactic Conquest maps (playing as the Empire)

There are three game modes: storyline-based Campaign, Galactic Conquest and Skirmish. Battles can take place on a planet (land battle) or above the planet (space battle). Land battles are fought with infantry and ground vehicle units, while space battles are fought with starfighter squadrons and large spacecraft.

Galactic Conquest is the sandbox campaign, in which the player controls either the Rebel Alliance or the Empire. A weaker, neutral faction of Pirates exists, but makes no attempt to battle the Rebels or Empire unless attacked. Each faction has at least one of three broad objectives for Galactic Conquest, which vary depending on which scenario is being played: kill the enemy leader (Mon Mothma or Emperor Palpatine), protect or destroy the Death Star, or completely remove the other faction from the campaign map. Grand strategy, production, and resource management are facilitated through a three-dimensional galactic map. The player receives funds from planets they control and from mining facilities. Credits are used to research technology, build defenses and vehicles, and train troops. Each planet confers different advantages to its owner, even though some bonuses are specific to each faction (for example, controlling Kuat reduces the price of Imperial Star Destroyers by 25 percent).

When enemy forces meet (either fleets in space or ground forces landing an enemy planet) a battle ensues. The player(s) can use only the equipment they brought to the battle (be it an X-wing squadron or an AT-AT). Factions must battle across both space and land maps. The defender may also use any buildings (land) or their space station (space) if they have constructed them. In each battle, each side may only have a certain number of units on the field at a time; the rest are retained as Reinforcements, which can be called in any time to designated areas when allowed. In land battles, a player can field more units at a time if they capture Reinforcement Points.

The storyline campaign follows a semi-open linear path, where the given side must complete sequential mission objectives (such as stealing X-wing prototypes). Campaign missions build up to the plot of Star Wars and eventually, the Battle of Yavin. The campaign is very similar to Galactic Conquest, although the Galactic Map is gradually opened for play as the player completes scripted events and completes missions. While the Rebels steal most of the tech using the Droid Duo, the Empire advances in technology level by completing certain missions.

Skirmish mode is the familiar, classic RTS mode. Skirmishes come in two types: land and space. In land skirmishes, all players start with bases and must research upgrades and capture reinforcement points while fighting to destroy the enemy's base or command center. In space skirmish mode, all players have a space station that can be upgraded. The player buys land or space units to attack the enemy with until the enemy base/space station is destroyed or the enemy forces are destroyed. The player can advance in technology levels to access more powerful ships as the player gains more money. The player can build more buildings and defenses, and the space station can also be upgraded to better defend itself without requiring the player to leave ships behind to defend it. Skirmish battles require the least time investment, so it is better suited toward casual players. Maps can support two, three, or four players, and the difficulty can be switched between easy, medium or hard.

All modes are played in real time. Days on the galactic map pass continually. When a battle occurs, galactic time is paused while the battle is waged. After the battle, the galactic day timer resumes. When playing against the computer, the player can accelerate time or pause time on both the galactic and skirmish maps.

All modes also make use of important Star Wars characters, such as Darth Vader, as Heroes. Each Hero is a single, moderately powerful unit with special abilities. For example, Obi-Wan Kenobi, Emperor Palpatine, and Darth Vader can use the Force. Some characters can be used in both land and space battles, (e.g. Darth Vader becomes a special TIE fighter unit in space), while others can be used only on land or only in space (a land-only Hero will remain on board a landing craft or command ship during space battles and have no use of their special abilities).

== Plot ==
The game's plot is that of the Galactic Civil War and the construction of the Death Star. It occurs during the events leading up to A New Hope.

In the Rebel campaign, the fledgling Rebel Alliance begin with an attack on the shipyards at Kuat introducing the player to basic space combat before infiltrating the planet of Wayland on a basic ground combat mission. The campaign explores how the X-wing fighter is pressed into the service of the Rebel Alliance, the liberation of Kashyyyk, the first whisperings of a brand new Imperial superweapon and ultimately the Battle of Yavin.

The Imperial campaign features Darth Vader and his search for the fledgling Rebel Alliance, interspersed with missions to help complete construction of the Death Star. It then transpires that the plans for the Death Star have been stolen so the player has to seek out the traitor who has passed the plans to the Rebels, intercept Princess Leia and then use the Death Star to crush the Alliance once and for all.

== Development ==
Star Wars: Empire at War was first mentioned in 2004, by then-president of LucasArts Jim Ward. He discussed the possibility of a RTS video game set in the Star Wars universe, stating "...there's a bright future there for games based on these new properties as well as original Star Wars games like a new real-time strategy PC game that Petroglyph is developing for next year". Ward described the game as taking the real-time strategy genre in a new direction and outlined plans to balance the gameplay between hardcore games and audiences familiar with the Star Wars franchise. The game was unveiled by LucasArts on January 21, 2005, with an original release date set for the end of 2005. LucasArts said that the newly formed Petroglyph Games would be developing an original 3-D game engine, titled Alamo, for Star Wars: Empire at War and that the game would support online battles for up to eight players.

Lead designer Joe Bostic outlined the gameplay for Star Wars: Empire at War, stating the developer's priorities were for players to have easy control of ships during space combat because of difficulties with the structure of the space aspect of the game. He said that the scaling of the various units in the game was another difficulty that the developers had to overcome to balance the gameplay. In 2006, Chris Rubyor, a former employee of Westwood Studios, discussed the galactic conquest mode of the game, stating that the initial mode had to be overhauled several times because Petroglyph was unhappy with the original mode. Rubyor said the game's skirmish mode incorporated a variety of new and traditional strategy mechanics found throughout RTS genre. He also said the game's focus was primarily combat and unit tactics, while allowing units and new technologies to be purchased during skirmish combat, a feature that was not put in the main single-player campaign or galactic conquest. The game's musical score was composed by Frank Klepacki. Klepacki said surround sound was an important aspect for the game because he said he believed many past RTS games did not take advantage of the features of surround sound. The game's audio took elements from the Star Wars films, as well as adding new elements to add variety to the game. Much of the sound effects were created by Klepacki, including all sounds in the interface and structure.

A stage demo and trailer were on display at E3 2005. On July 15, 2005, LucasArts released a new trailer and announced a release date of February 7, 2006. A playable build of Star Wars: Empire at War was well received at the 2005 Games Convention in Leipzig, Germany.

The official demo of Star Wars: Empire at War was available for download on January 18, 2006, for Microsoft Windows systems. It featured five introduction tutorials to the game, and one galactic conquest mission with the player assuming the role of the Rebel Alliance. The full Windows version was released on February 16. On November 3, 2006, Aspyr Media Inc. announced Empire at War would be coming to the Mac OS X platform in April 2007. The Mac demo was released in March 2007.

=== Post-release ===
Following the acquisition of Lucasfilm by The Walt Disney Company in 2012, most of the licensed Star Wars Expanded Universe material produced between 1977 and 2014 was rebranded as Star Wars Legends and declared non-canon to the franchise. The Legends works comprise a separate narrative universe. (Note: Attributed to multiple references:)

On May 31, 2014, online functionality, including network multiplayer and wireless chat, was discontinued after Glu Mobile's purchase of GameSpy and the subsequent shutdown of all game servers. In 2017, multiplayer was re-enabled on the Steam version with Workshop support added.

Petroglyph has continued to support Star Wars: Empire at War for several years after its release. In 2017, Petroglyph released an update that added support for windowed mode and removed its dependency on GameSpy for multiplayer, among other changes. A 2021 update prevented the planet Coruscant from crashing the game, while a 2022 update added several multiplayer maps. In November 2023, Petroglyph issued a patch that converted both Empire at War and Forces of Corruption to 64-bit applications, which it said was done to "solve many out-of-memory bugs and crashes that players were experiencing", as well as several bug fixes. In October 2024, Petroglyph again released a patch, this time improving performance and implementing crash fixes.

An active modding community exists for the game. One such mod for Forces of Corruption, "Thrawn's Revenge", allows the player to play as Grand Admiral Thrawn to fight the New Republic.

== Reception ==
Reception

Aggregate score
Aggregator	Score
Metacritic	79/100

Review scores
Publication	Score
Eurogamer	7/10
Game Informer	8.25/10
GamePro	3/5
GameRevolution	B−
GameSpot	8.7/10
GameSpy	3.5/5
GameZone	8.4/10
IGN	7.6/10
PC Gamer (US)	85%
VideoGamer.com	5/10
The A.V. Club	B
Detroit Free Press	3/4

Star Wars: Empire at War received a "Silver" sales award from the Entertainment and Leisure Software Publishers Association (ELSPA), indicating sales of at least 100,000 copies in the United Kingdom. By 2017, the game sold over 6.7 million copies.

Star Wars: Empire at War received "generally favorable reviews" according to the review aggregation website Metacritic. GameSpot said, "Empire at War delivers a true Star Wars experience". IGN said, "Star Wars: Empire at War definitely scores big in terms of style.... If you're hoping to enjoy this game because you really like Star Wars, you'll probably be satisfied for quite a while, but if your interest in the Star Wars property takes a back seat to your desire for a solid strategy experience, the few innovations aren't going to be enough to overcome the repetitive nature of the fights."

The A.V. Club gave it a B and stated that "you could find a deeper or better-tuned strategy game—but this one has AT-ATs." Detroit Free Press gave it three stars out of four, saying, "The day-to-day ground conflicts that make up most of the game are not particularly inspiring. The full-on space wars are a real thrill to behold." However, The Sydney Morning Herald gave it three stars out of five and said that it "hits all the right notes if you're a Star Wars fan, but be prepared to grind out your victories."

The editors of Computer Games Magazine named Empire at War the tenth-best computer game of 2006, and called it "one of the most inventive games in years". The Academy of Interactive Arts & Sciences nominated Empire at War for "Strategy Game of the Year" at the 10th Annual Interactive Achievement Awards.
