= Hasbro Darth Vader Voice Changer =

Star Wars themed toy

The Darth Vader Voice Changer is a toy released by Hasbro in 2004 as part of the tail end of its Original Trilogy Collection line of toys focusing on characters from Star Wars, The Empire Strikes Back, and Return of the Jedi. The voice changer allows the wearer to talk in a voice somewhat like James Earl Jones as Darth Vader, the Dark Lord of the Sith, and also included numerous built-in phrases and Vader's breathing sound from the movies. Variations of the helmet also exist. In 2008, a similar Clone Trooper Voice Changer was released to promote the Clone Wars film.

In regions such as Europe where languages other than English are spoken, the Darth Vader Voice Changer's sounds were modified to fit the language demographic. However, rather than replacing the movie phrases with foreign-language versions, the button that plays back the phrases in the U.S. version simply plays back the same breathing sounds activated by the adjacent button in both the European and U.S. versions.

This proved to be a popular toy. and was repackaged for later use. In early 2005 it was sold in a revised box for the movie Star Wars: Episode III – Revenge of the Sith.
