= Prop replica =

Recreation of a movie or TV prop

A prop replica is a collectible recreation of a movie or television prop that is intended to accurately re-create the item as it appeared in the original media. Work on a prop replica can range from the use of resin to cast a copy of an already existing item to the modification of an existing product that may have been used by a property master to the use of electrical components for added functionality, such as lighting effects and sound.

== Film-accurate props ==
There are different schools of thought in the propping community as to how far film-accuracy should be carried. Some prefer to produce the prop as it would have appeared fresh from the factory, but others strive to duplicate every scratch, ding, and imperfection that they can prove to have existed on the original prop in a technique referred to as weathering.

Invisible details such as wiring and electronics do not affect the visual accuracy of the prop as long as the effects those components are responsible for producing are identical to that of the original. Blinking lights and illuminated buttons appear everywhere from the bridge of the Enterprise to Darth Vader's belt, and attempting to reproduce the exact circuit boards and lamps faithfully is usually impossible or impractical, particularly for older films. Similarly, mechanical effects and even the choice of materials often boils down to practicality and the purpose of the prop rather than close attention to detail. A prop designed to be worn with a costume may be constructed differently than one intended solely for display in a sealed case.

== Types of propping ==
Building prop replicas draws from many areas of expertise including drafting, carpentry, electronics, metalworking, Computer-aided design and sculpting and mold making.

- Costuming or Cosplay — recreating entire outfits used in various media.
- Paper props are recreated licenses, IDs, money, signs, and other documents.
- Hardware propping uses 'found' items, existing parts used by the original prop builders (such as a particular vacuum tube model, or a motorcycle boot buckle) to recreate a prop.
- Kitbashing — modifying an existing model or toy.
- Modeling

== Frequently replicated ==
There are many props regularly replicated by fans and merchants. Some of the most common include:

- Proton packs from Ghostbusters series
- Talkboy from Home Alone 2
- Lawgiver from Judge Dredd
- Rick Deckard's sidearm from Blade Runner
- Boba Fett's armor and weapons from Star Wars series
- Imperial stormtrooper armor and weapons from Star Wars series
- Darth Vader's mask from Star Wars series
- Lightsabers from Star Wars series
- Dean Winchester's leather jacket from the hit drama/comedy series Supernatural
- Henry Jones Sr.'s "grail diary" from Indiana Jones and the Last Crusade
- Wonka chocolate bars from Willy Wonka and the Chocolate Factory
