= Matt Sloan (voice actor) =

American director, voice actor, comedian and YouTuber

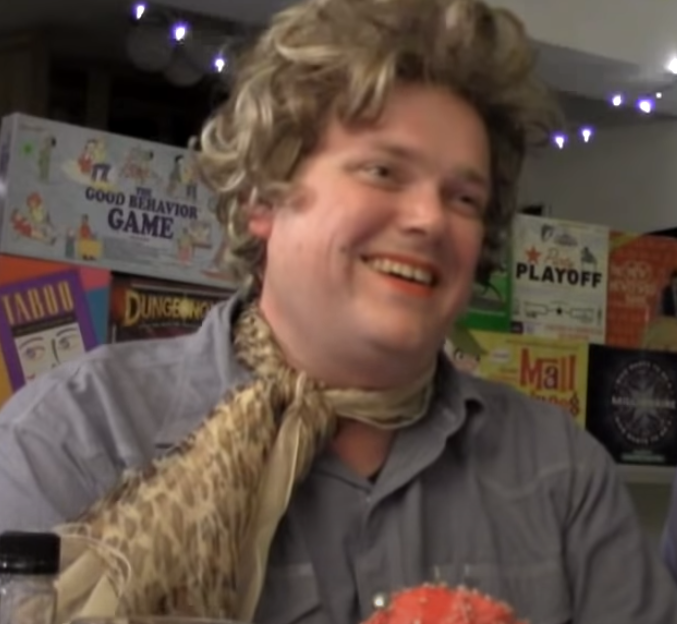
- Sloan in 2013
- Born: March 24, 1973 (age 53)
- Occupations: Voice actor; director; writer; businessman; YouTuber
- Years active: 1993–present

Matt Sloan (born March 24, 1973) is an American voice actor, director, writer, and YouTuber from Madison, Wisconsin. He and his friend Aaron Yonda are notable as the co-creators of the web series Chad Vader: Day Shift Manager, in which he voices the title character. Additionally, he appears in season one as the main antagonist, Clint. He later appeared in the first few episodes of the second series as Champion J. Pepper, Clint's father. Since Chad Vader, he has gone on to voice Darth Vader in various Star Wars media as the sound double for James Earl Jones.

He hosts a movie reviewing and discussion show on YouTube called Welcome to the Basement until April 2023 with his friend Craig Johnson as co-host, since then a rotating cast of friends and fellow improv performers. Furthermore, he leads regularly with Aaron Yonda in the web series Beer and Board Games.

== Star Wars ==
As a voice actor, Sloan played Darth Vader in Soulcalibur IV. Sloan went on to reprise his role as the voice of Darth Vader in the LucasArts video games Star Wars: The Force Unleashed, and Star Wars: Empire at War: Forces of Corruption. He also appeared as the voice of Darth Vader during an episode of Deal or No Deal. Sloan also played Vader for the comedy short promoting TomTom devices. He returned as Vader for Star Wars: The Force Unleashed II. In 2012, Sloan voiced Darth Vader in both Lego Star Wars: The Empire Strikes Out and Kinect Star Wars. In 2015, Sloan returned to voice Vader in Disney Infinity 3.0, Star Wars Battlefront, Star Wars Battlefront II and multiple Lego Star Wars shorts and television series, as well as providing his voice for a sketch in the final episode of The Daily Show with Jon Stewart.

== Filmography ==
=== Television ===
Year	Title	Role	Notes
1993	The Splu Urtaf Show	Various / writer / producer / Director / editor / Composer / crew	
2004	When the Lord Attacks	Preacher / writer / producer / crew	
2004	My Old House	producer	
2005	Channel 101: The Musical	Look Guy / Superhero / Self	
2005–2006	Channy Awards	Self	
2006	McCourt's in Session	Judge McCourt / (creator) / writer / producer / Director / editor	
2006	Fun Rangers	Cody / (creator) / writer / producer / Director / editor / Composer	
2007	Acceptable TV	writer/ Director	
2008	YouTube Live	Chad Vader	
2009	Water and Power	Guy / producer	
2006–2012	Chad Vader: Day Shift Manager	Clint Shermer / Chad Vader / Baby Cookie / Champion J. Pepper / Trooper 1 / creator / executive producer / Director / editor / musician	
2010–2011	Stupid for Movies	Chad Vader	
2012	The Sean Ward Show	Chad Vader	
2012	Vlogbrothers	Chad Vader	
2012	Lego Star Wars: The Empire Strikes Out	Darth Vader (voice)	Television short
2014	Lego Star Wars: The Yoda Chronicles	Darth Vader (voice)	4 Episodes
2015	Lego Star Wars: Droid Tales	Darth Vader, Stormtrooper, Construction Worker 1 (voices)	3 Episodes
2015	The Daily Show	Darth Vader	1 Episode
2005–2016	Super Shooter	Chief McAllister / Assassin / Foreign Dignitary / writer / producer / Director/ editor / Composer	
2015	Death Battle	Darth Vader	Archive footage taken from Soulcalibur IV
2015–2016	Rated RPG	Brandon Brenson / Boswell / Leslie Wind / Dr. Louvre / Ed Krantz / Sam Elliott / Ron Latch / Inspector Stevens / Old Woman #1 / creator / Director / editor	
2016	The Toycracker: A Mini Musical Spectacular	Darth Vader	Television short
2016–2017	Lego Star Wars: The Freemaker Adventures	Darth Vader, Stormtroopers, Others (voices)	16 Episodes
2017	Quick Reviews with Maverick	Self	2 Episodes
2020	The Lego Star Wars Holiday Special	Darth Vader (voice)	
2021	Lego Star Wars: Terrifying Tales	Darth Vader (voice)	
2023	Cinema 7	Randy	Television short
2024	Lego Star Wars: Rebuild the Galaxy	Jedi Vader	2 Episodes
2011-	Beer and Board Games	Self / Baby Cookie / Herb Kimmons / Lawrence Welk / Chad Vader / Sir Simon Shrieks / Sir Shrieks-A-Lot / Ol' Shitty Teeth / Terry Kwazo / creator / producer / Director / performer / writer / editor / Foley artist / sound effects editor / adr loop group / costumer / drawings / camera operator / creative advisor / TV Series documentary	
2012-	Welcome to the Basement	Self - Host / Director / writer / producer / performer / editor / sound effects editor / Foley artist / costumer	

=== Video games ===
Year	Title	Voice role	Notes
2006	Star Wars: Empire at War	Darth Vader	
2008	Star Wars: The Force Unleashed	Darth Vader	
2008	Zen Pinball	Darth Vader	
2008	Soulcalibur IV	Darth Vader	English dub
2010	Star Wars: The Force Unleashed II	Darth Vader	
2012	Kinect Star Wars	Darth Vader	
2012	FearFighter	Mad Scientist	
2015	Disney Infinity 3.0	Darth Vader	
2015	Star Wars Battlefront	Darth Vader	
2016	Lego Star Wars: The Force Awakens	Darth Vader	
2017	Star Wars Battlefront II	Darth Vader	

== See also ==
- Star Wars parodies
