= Star Wars: Empire at War: Forces of Corruption =

- Original CD-ROM box art
- Developer: Petroglyph
- Publisher: LucasArts
- Director: Joseph Bostic
- Producer: Michael Duane Fetterman
- Designer: Christopher M. Rubyor
- Programmer: André Arsenault
- Artist: Gary Cox
- Writer: Patrick Pannullo
- Composer: Frank Klepacki
- Series: Star Wars
- Engine: Alamo
- Platform: Microsoft Windows
- Release: NA: October 24, 2006; AU: October 25, 2006; EU: October 27, 2006
- Genre: Real-time strategy
- Modes: Single-player, Multiplayer

Star Wars: Empire at War: Forces of Corruption is an expansion pack for the computer game Star Wars: Empire at War released in October 2006. It adds the "Zann Consortium" as a third faction in addition to a number of new features.

== Gameplay ==
For further information see Star Wars: Empire at War Gameplay

A screenshot of the Galactic map during gameplay (playing as the Zann Consortium) showing multiple planets under an effect of corruption

Star Wars: Empire at War: Forces of Corruption adds the organized crime syndicate the Zann Consortium as a third faction. Pirates had previously been present in the game, but as a type of moderately-armed "speed bump" to progression in the war between Empire and Rebellion. The Zann Consortium is a new faction, neither good or evil, but willing to go to any lengths for a profit.

The Consortium has a full-fledged campaign that is set in the background of the original film trilogy. Its specialty is "corruption": it can conquer planets traditionally, but also gain bonuses from enemy-controlled worlds by having its infiltrators conduct any of several kinds of missions such as bribery, sabotage or piracy. Several mission types cause a small battle. It also has a mish-mash set of original units: A ring of raiders, renegades and ruffians eventually expands to eclectic exotic equipment as the Consortium appropriates everything it can lay its hands on. Crowd-pleasers include Rancor riders, surviving Droidekas and, if a "slavery" mission is performed on the forest moon of Endor, suicide bomber Ewoks.

The Rebel Alliance and the Empire receive new units and changes to existing ones. Corruption also introduces the ability to position structures and units on a planet's surface, pre-select starting units during space or ground battles, mobile build pads and transport ships for ground battles, the ability to repair space station hardpoints, and orbital bombardment from capital ships.

The Galactic conquest mode includes new planets, with the added feature of non-conquest goals. The skirmish mode includes maps for the new planets alongside the previous maps, with the optional feature of having a third player on the map. Corruption includes 12 new planets: Dathomir, Mandalore, Hypori, Myrkr, Felucia, Honoghr, Kamino, Mustafar, Muunilinst, Saleucami, The Maw, and Utapau. Alderaan is now an asteroid field and Bespin has a new ground landscape. Some planets now have infantry- and light vehicle-only terrain, and damaging terrain. New vehicles are also available, most drawn from the books and comics taking place after or between the original saga. These include three phases of the Empire's Dark Trooper, Lancet Aerial Artillery, the TIE Defender, and the Super Star Destroyer Executor. Many of the new units and planets included in the game are incorporated from the Star Wars expanded universe.

== Plot ==
The campaign story begins just prior to the Battle of Yavin; as the game progresses, events from the Star Wars films occur, such as the Battle of Endor. The tutorial mission sets up the main campaign plot, showing Tyber Zann's imprisonment for stealing a Sith artifact from Jabba the Hutt. The actual campaign story begins with Tyber Zann, the leader of the Zann Consortium, being rescued from imprisonment on Kessel with help from Urai Fen, his loyal friend and lieutenant of the mercenary army he built over the years; Fen himself arrived on Kessel with the help of Han Solo and Chewbacca. The four of them then escape aboard the Millennium Falcon.

While re-establishing his headquarters, Tyber goes to Yavin IV after the Death Star destruction, where he learns of the Emperor's hidden treasury vaults and designs for a new Super Star Destroyer. After renewed conflict with Jabba the Hutt, Tyber sends Urai to capture Jabba's communications outpost on Saleucami and then goes to the factory world of Hypori, where he takes control of Jabba's Droideka factory, bribes the bounty hunter Bossk, and negotiates a truce with Jabba (both sides cease attacks, plus Jabba withdraws his bounty on Tyber and surrenders the planets Saleucami and Hypori). To unlock the secrets of the artifact, Tyber and Urai Fen go to Dathomir to find a dark-side Force user. They eventually free the witch Silri along with the other Nightsisters (both of whom are adept at the dark side of the Force). After killing the imperial governor, Tyber, Urai and Silri escape the planet and return to the Consortium's stronghold on Ryloth. Prince Xizor, the head of Black Sun crime syndicate, agrees to arrange a meeting between Tyber and an Imperial contact to sell the artifact. In return, Tyber is to steal some valuable Tibanna gas from the planet Bespin; with help from the bounty hunter IG-88, Tyber implicates the Black Sun, and watches Darth Vader finish them off.

Later, Grand Admiral Thrawn and Tyber (in his new flagship, the Merciless) clash in space above Imperial planet Carida. During the battle, Bossk steals the artifact and heads towards Thrawn's ship, the Star Destroyer Admonitor. Thrawn retreats shortly after, however Tyber planted a tracking device on the artifact earlier, allowing him to track it to Coruscant where he, Urai, and Silri raid the Emperor's personal data center, retrieving the Sith artifact and obtaining passcodes for the Emperor's flagship, the under-construction Eclipse-class Super Star Destroyer.

After the destruction of the Death Star II, Tyber and his forces assault the Eclipse over Kuat; he is joined by the Rebel Alliance fleet who want to destroy the Eclipse, but he boards it and uses it to repel both Imperial and Rebel forces. Despite a malfunction with the Eclipse’s super-laser and the arrival of the Imperial Super Star Destroyer Annihilator, Consortium forces repel all opposition and eventually defeat both enemy fleets; he then uses the Eclipse’s computer to track the Emperor's vaults, before abandoning the ship. Meanwhile, Silri uses the Sith artifact to locate an ancient Sith army frozen in carbonite; the story ends with Silri piloting a Consortium shuttle to an unknown world, and uncovering the Sith army. The army itself seems to be from Revan’s infinite army in Star Wars: Knights of the Old Republic, making it over 4,000 years old.

== Development and marketing ==
Forces of Corruption uses Alamo, the same game engine as the original Star Wars: Empire at War. Higher resolution textures for better graphics are included in the expansion, and larger maps (30% - 40% bigger) have been included.

Following the announcement of the game, Star Wars: Empire at War: Forces of Corruption was shown at LucasArts' booth during E3 2006. A single player demo was made available, which featured a single tutorial-mission; the player had to corrupt the planet of Mandalore, establish a black market on Nal Hutta, and take over the planet of Kamino. The game was later released on October 24, 2006 in the United States.

=== Post-release ===
Following the release of Forces of Corruption, LucasArts and Petroglyph released the first patch for the game, which included many minor fixes.

Following the acquisition of Lucasfilm by The Walt Disney Company in 2012, most of the licensed Star Wars Expanded Universe material produced between 1977 and 2014 was rebranded as Star Wars Legends and declared non-canon to the franchise. The Legends works comprise a separate narrative universe. (Note: Attributed to multiple references:)

On May 31, 2014, online functionality, including network multiplayer and wireless chat, was discontinued after Glu Mobile's purchase of GameSpy and the subsequent shutdown of all game servers. In 2017, multiplayer was re-enabled on the Steam version with Workshop support added.

Petroglyph has continued to support Star Wars: Empire at War for several years after its release. In 2017, Petroglyph released an update that added support for windowed mode and removed its dependency on GameSpy for multiplayer, among other changes. A 2021 update prevented the planet Coruscant from crashing the game, while a 2022 update added several multiplayer maps. In November 2023, Petroglyph issued a patch that converted both Empire at War and Forces of Corruption to 64-bit applications, which it said was done to "solve many out-of-memory bugs and crashes that players were experiencing", as well as several bug fixes.

An active modding community exists for the game. One such mod, "Thrawn's Revenge", allows the player to play as Grand Admiral Thrawn to fight the New Republic.

== Reception ==
Reception

Aggregate scores
| Aggregator | Score |
|---|---|
| GameRankings | 77% |
| Metacritic | 75/100 |

Review scores
| Publication | Score |
|---|---|
| Eurogamer | 7/10 |
| Game Informer | 7.5/10 |
| GamePro | 4/5 |
| GameSpot | 8.1/10 |
| GameSpy | 3.5/5 |
| GameZone | 8.3/10 |
| IGN | 8.5/10 |
| PALGN | 8/10 |
| PC Gamer (US) | 68% |
| X-Play | 3/5 |

Forces of Corruption was met with positive reception, as GameRankings gave it a score of 77%, while Metacritic gave it 75 out of 100.

The Australian video game talk show Good Game's two reviewers gave the game a 6/10 and 7/10.
