= Aaron Yonda =

American Internet personality

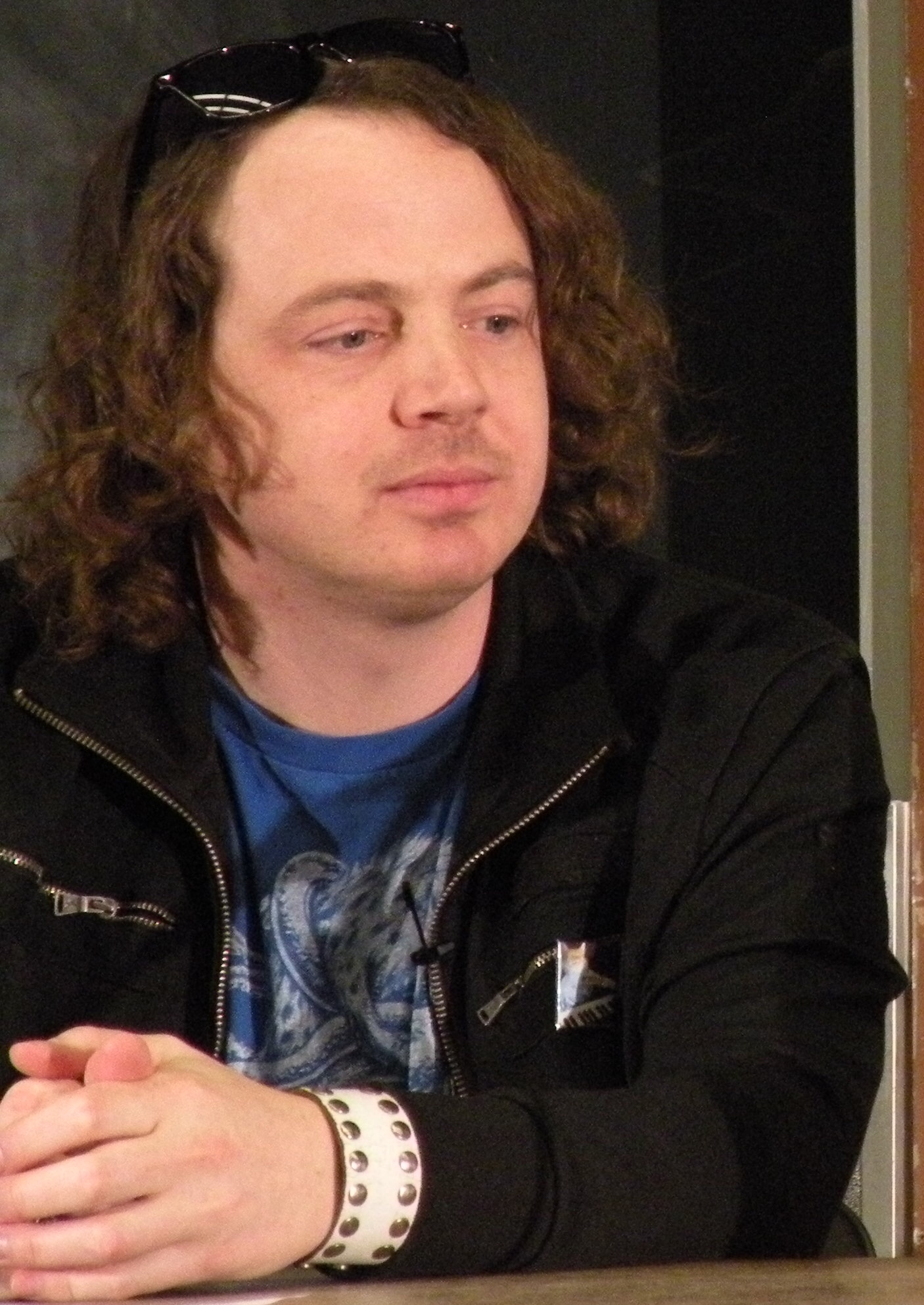
- Yonda at ROFLCon 2010
- Born: January 19, 1973 (age 53); Madison, Wisconsin, U.S.
- Occupations: Comedian, writer, actor, and director

Aaron Yonda (born January 19, 1973) is an American comedian, writer, actor, director, and YouTuber from Menomonie, Wisconsin.

He portrays the title character in Chad Vader: Day Shift Manager, a web serial he co-produced with his friend Matt Sloan, who provides the voice of Chad.

== Early life ==
Yonda is a graduate of the University of Wisconsin-Eau Claire.

== Career ==
His short film, The Life and Death of a Pumpkin, swept the Chicago Horror Film Festival awards, receiving "Best Short Film" and "Concept". His shorts have been screened worldwide including the Just for Laughs Festival and the Worldwide Short Film Festival in Toronto.

Yonda is also a member of the comedy troupe Monkey Business Institute in Madison, Wisconsin.

== See also ==
- Star Wars parodies
