= KAG =

KAG may refer to:

- Communist Working Groups (Swedish: Kommunistiska Arbetsgrupperna), a former political organization in Sweden
- Kajaman language, by ISO 639 language code
- Gangneung Air Base, South Korea Air Force, Gangwon-do, IATA code
- Kauno Autobusų Gamykla, bus factory in Kaunas, Lithuanian SSR 1956-1979
- Keep America Great, a political slogan popularized by Donald Trump
- Kilmar Abrego Garcia, a United States resident illegally deported in 2025
- KiriKiri, an adventure game system
- King Arthur's Gold, an online multiplayer action game
