= Automotive industry in the Soviet Union =

The automotive industry in the Soviet Union spanned the history of the state from 1929 to 1991. It started with the establishment of large car manufacturing plants and reorganisation of the AMO Factory in Moscow in the late 1920s–early 1930s, during the first five-year plan, and continued until the Soviet Union's dissolution in 1991.

Before its dissolution, the Soviet Union produced 2.1-2.3 million units per year of all types, and was the sixth (previously fifth) largest automotive producer, ranking ninth place in cars, third in trucks, and first in buses.

Soviet industry exported 300,000-400,000 cars annually, mainly to Soviet Union satellite countries, but also to North America, Central and Western Europe, and Latin America.

There were substantial numbers of highway trucks (Volvo, MAN from capitalist countries; LIAZ, Csepel and IFA from socialist countries) in some quantities, construction trucks (Magirus-Deutz, Tatra), delivery trucks (Robur and Avia) and urban, intercity and tourist buses (Ikarus, Karosa) imported as well.

== History ==
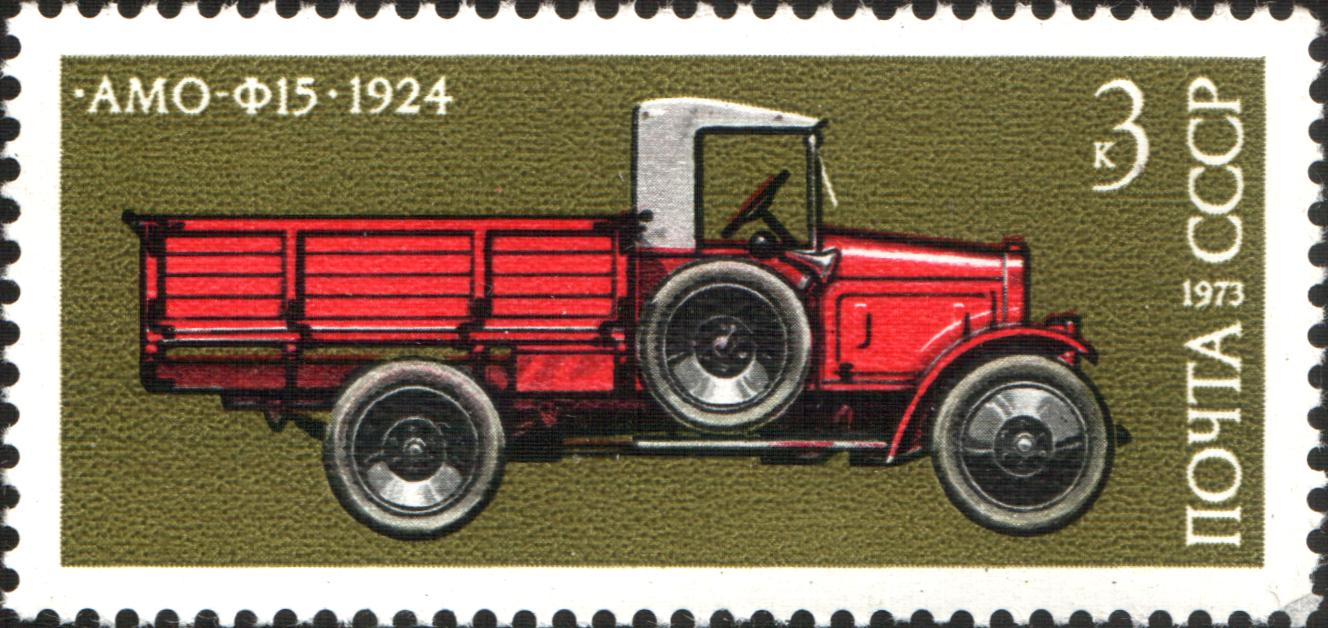
AMO-F-15 on a Soviet stamp

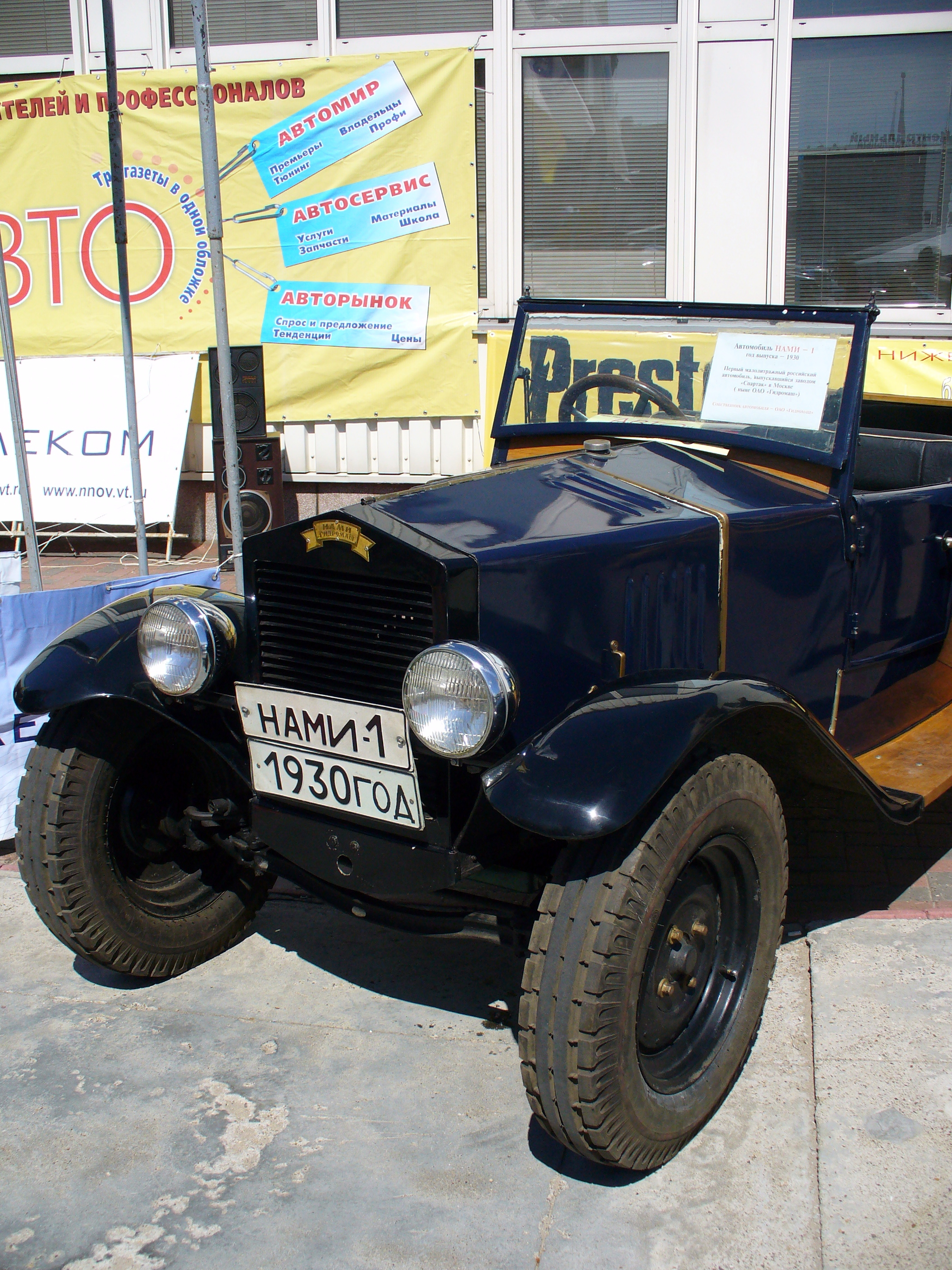
NAMI-I

=== Early Soviet period ===
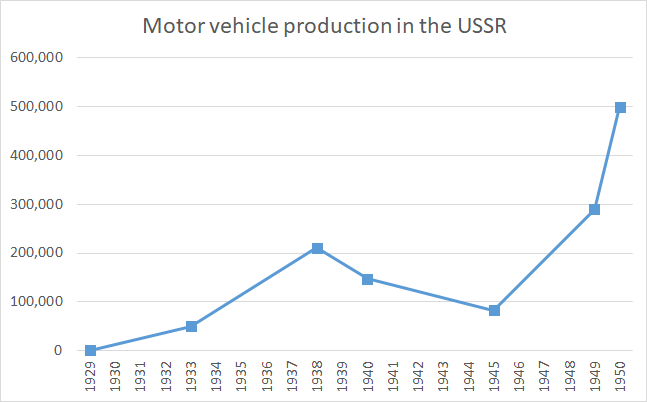
Motor vehicle production in the USSR, 1929-1950

Russia had no automotive industry prior to the Soviet era. Automobiles were manufactured, but only in small quantity and by importing the main components from abroad.

After the 1917 October Revolution, Russo-Balt was nationalised on August 15, 1918, and renamed to Prombron by the new leadership. It continued the production of Russo-Balt cars and launched a new model on October 8, 1922, while AMO built FIAT 15 Ter trucks under licence and released a more modern FIAT-derived truck developed by a team of AMO designers, the AMO-F-15. About 6,000–6,500 F-15s were built in the years 1924–1931.

A Citroën plant built before the war was allowed to operate as a private business until 1921, when it was nationalized.

The first fully Soviet-made vehicles were manufactured by the AMO plant in Moscow on 7 November 1924. In 1927, engineers from the Scientific Automobile & Motor Institute (NAMI) created the first original Soviet car NAMI-I, which was produced in small numbers by the Spartak State Automobile Factory in Moscow, between 1927 and 1931.

In the early decades after the Revolution, Gorky and Moscow became the main centers of motor vehicle manufacturing. As in Western countries, components for the industry were produced in a large number of different places.

Stalinist pressure for rapid industrialization and appreciation for economies of scale brought about the construction in the late 1920s and early 1930s of massive factories manufacturing highly standard vehicle and slowly changing product lines. Construction of the Moscow (ZIL), Gor‘kiy, and Yaroslavl' plants, partly or totally built by Western firms, increased production from a few thousand vehicles in 1928 to 200,000 vehicles in 1937, nearly all of them trucks.

In 1929, due to a rapidly growing demand for automobiles and in cooperation with its trade partner, the Ford Motor Company, the Supreme Soviet of the National Economy established GAZ.

A year later, a second automobile plant was founded in Moscow, which would become a major Soviet car maker after World War II and earn nationwide fame under the name Moskvitch. However, due to specific government aims and economic hardships of that time, cars were only a small share of all vehicles produced in the early years of Soviet production.

In 1937, the Soviet Union produced over 200,000 vehicles, mostly trucks, putting the country in second place worldwide by production of trucks.

Between 1932 and 1939 the amount of car production in the Soviet Union increased 844.6%.

=== Postwar period ===
After the war, the Soviet automotive industry developed rapidly. The State Defense Committee issued a number of important decisions: it established new car factories in Kutaisi and Dnepropetrovsk and on August 26, 1945, issued Resolution No. 9905 "On the Restoration and Development of the Automotive Industry", which outlined the future development of car production in the USSR. In 1947, the total number of automobiles produced in the Soviet Union was 132,968, including 9622 cars, 121,248 trucks, 2098 buses, but still did not exceed the pre-war level. Two years later, in 1949, it surpassed the previous record and in 1950 the production was brought up to 363,000 vehicles per year.

1948 marked the beginning of Soviet export of cars. In 1950, cars from the Soviet Union were present at the international car exhibition in Poznań, Poland, and soon thereafter were exported to Western Europe. By the late 1950s, the Soviet Union produced 43 car models, and in 1957 the overall number of vehicles produced was 495,994, which included 113,588 cars, 369,504 trucks, and 12,316 buses, and in the following year reached the level of 600,000 cars per year.

=== 1960s and 1970s ===
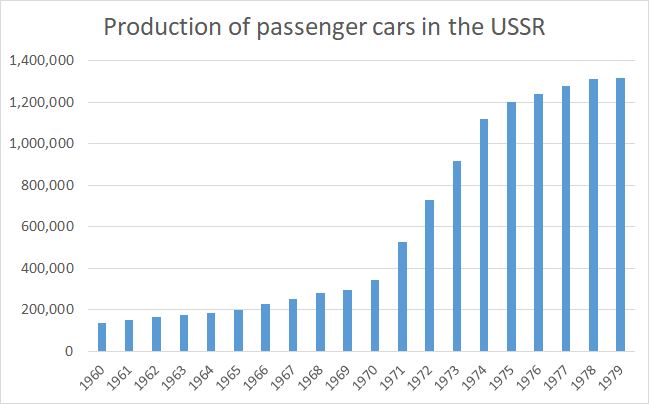
Production of passenger cars in the USSR, 1960-1979

In the 1960s the Soviets sought to diversify and broaden the motor vehicle industry but continued to rely on massive vertically integrated facilities. Their 15-year transportation modernization plan announced in 1965 called for increasing production of automobiles and heavy trucks to boost consumer welfare and create a larger and more balanced truck fleet.

At the beginning of the 1960s, when MZMA, GAZ and ZAZ were offering a variety of cars and personal automobile ownership in the Soviet Union was on the rise, the Soviet government opted to build an even larger car manufacturing plant that would produce a people's car and help to meet the demand for personal transport. For reasons of cost-efficiency, it was decided to sign a licence agreement with a foreign company and produce the car on the basis of an existing, modern model. Several options were considered, including Volkswagen, Ford, Peugeot, Renault and FIAT. The Fiat 124 was chosen because of its simple and sturdy design, being easy to manufacture and repair. The plant was built in just 4 years (1966–1970) in the small town of Stavropol Volzhsky, which later grew to a population of more than half a million and was renamed Togliatti to commemorate Palmiro Togliatti, the long time head of the Italian Communist Party (PCI), who died shortly before construction of the plant began.

At the same time, the Izhmash car plant was established in the city of Izhevsk as part of the Izhevsk Mechanical Plant, with the initiative coming from the Minister of Defence Dmitriy Ustinov and in order to increase the overall production of cars in the Soviet Union. It produced Moskvitchs and Moskvitch-based kombi hatchbacks.

By 1970, the manufacture of trucks and other commercial vehicles was decentralized and these were made not only in Moscow and Gorky but also in Belarus (Minsk, Zhodino), Ukraine (Kremenchug), Georgia (Kutaisi), and in the Volga and Ural regions (Ulyanovsk and Miass). The manufacture of automobiles was confined exclusively to Moscow, Gorky, and Izhevsk (Ural region) until the late 1960s.

From 1970 to 1979, automobile production grew by nearly 1 million units per year, and truck production grew by 250,000 per year. The production ratio of automobiles to trucks increased in that time from 0.7 to 1.7, indicating that more attention was being given to the consumer market.

The Soviets reportedly allocated one-half of the estimated 7 billion rubles invested in the automotive industry during 1971-75 to the construction of the Volga car and Kama truck plants. As the 15-year plan was drawing to a close, the Soviets modified their traditional approach of simply building additional plants to raise output. Soviet officials publicly acknowledged the need for continued growth in vehicle production, but they stressed the need for greater productivity and new vehicle designs to improve performance, utility and operating efficiency.

=== 1980s ===
By the early 1980s, Soviet automobile industry consisted of several main plants, which produced vehicles for various market segments. Prior to 1988, private buyers were also not allowed to buy commercial vehicles like minibuses, vans, trucks or buses for personal use. Domestic car production satisfied only 45% of the domestic demand; nevertheless, no import of cars was permitted.

=== Post-1991 ===
After the dissolution of the Soviet Union in December 1991, automakers of the newly formed Commonwealth of Independent States were integrated into a market economy and immediately hit by a crisis due to the loss of financial support, economic turmoil, criminal activities and stiffer competition in the domestic market during the 1990s. Some of them, like AvtoVAZ, turned to cooperation with other companies (such as GM-AvtoVAZ) in order to obtain substantial capital investment and overcome the crisis. Few others, like AZLK, became dormant, whereas ZAZ transformed itself into a new company, UkrAVTO.

== Private ownership ==
There were queues for the purchase of cars and many domestic buyers often had to wait years for a new car. In the 1970s, passenger cars made by VAZ (Lada) and GAZ (Volga) were the most in demand. Volgas were the most prestigious vehicles sold to private buyers, although up to 60% of the production was reserved for state and party institutions. Always popular and available for sale were Moskvitch and Zaporozhets cars, as well as compact four-wheel-drive LuAZ vehicles. All-terrain cars made by UAZ were not available privately, but could be bought decommissioned. Limousine brands Chaika (GAZ factory) and ZIL were not available for the general public.

== List of manufacturers ==
The bulk of the automotive industry of the Soviet Union, with annual production approaching 1.8 million units, was located in Russian SFSR. Ukrainian SSR was second, at more than 200,000 units per year, Byelorussian SSR was third at 40,000. Other Soviet republics (SSRs) did not have significant automotive industries. Only the first two republics produced all types of automobiles.

With the exception of ZAZ and LuAZ, which were located in the Ukrainian SSR, all the aforementioned companies were located in the RSFSR. Besides the RSFSR, some truck plants were established in Ukrainian, Byelorussian, Georgian, Armenian, and Kyrghizian SSRs while buses were produced in the Ukrainian, Latvian, Lithuanian, and Tajik republics.

=== Armenian SSR ===
- ErAZ (1964–2002) produced RAF-based panel vans and minibuses.

=== Azerbaijan SSR ===
- BakAZ (1978–1993) produced PAZ-based small buses
- KiAZ (1986–present)

=== Byelorussian SSR ===
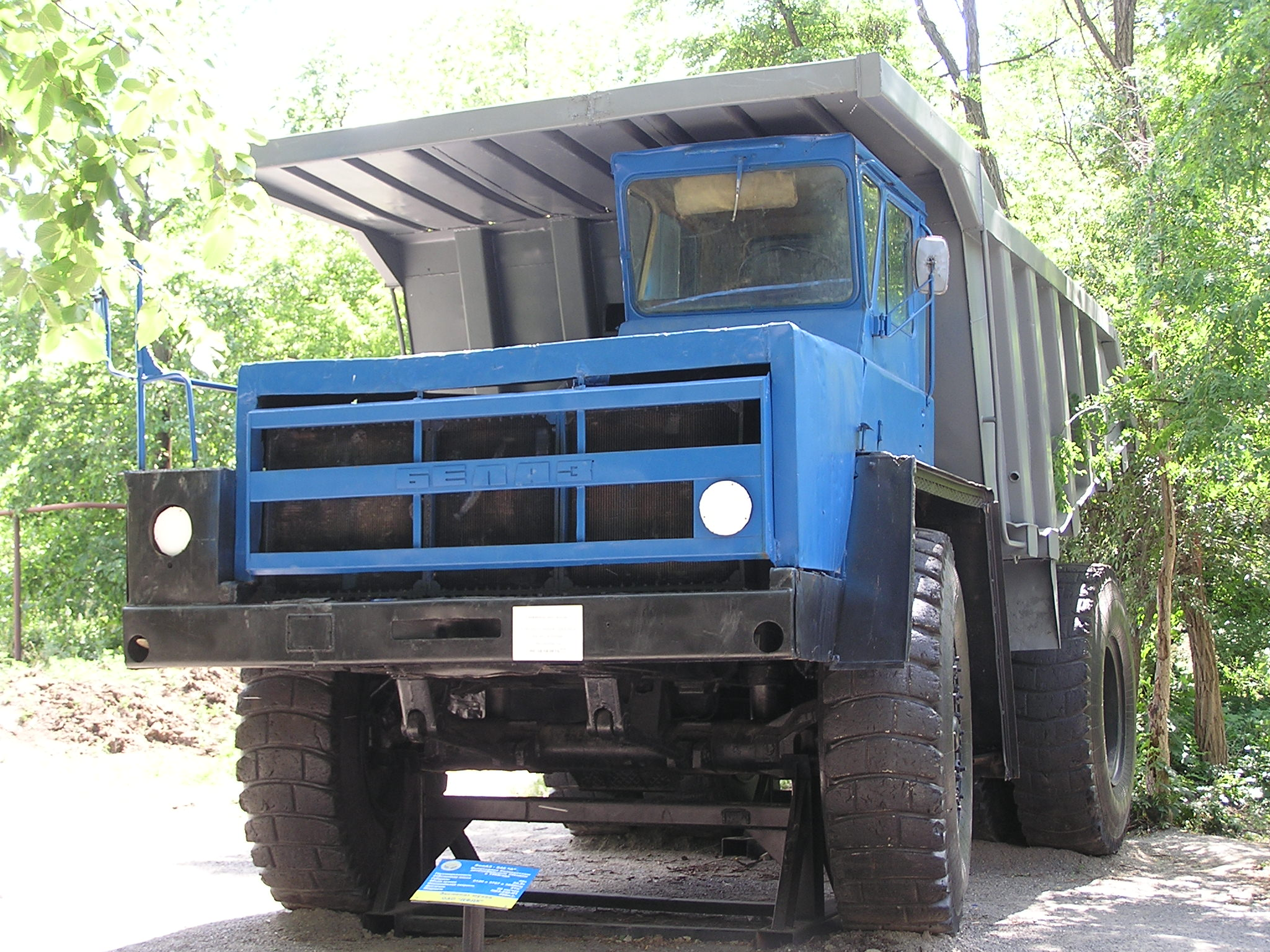
BelAZ-548A

- BelAZ (1948–present) manufactured super-heavy trucks
- MAZ (1944–present) manufactured heavy trucks
- MoAZ (1948–present)
- MZKT (1954–present) in Soviet times, was a division of MAZ, a manufacturer of heavy and super-heavy trucks
- Neman (1984–present) from 1990 started limited production of LiAZ-based buses

=== Estonian SSR ===
- ToARZ
- Estonia (race car)

=== Georgian SSR ===
- KAZ (1945–present, truck production ceased in the 1990s) produced backbone tractors with a comfortable cabin, but low quality and dynamic characteristics and had gained in the Soviet Union a bad reputation. Were gradually replaced by tractors MAZ and, later, KaMAZ

=== Kirghiz SSR ===
- Frunze Auto-assembly Plant

=== Latvian SSR ===
- RAF (1949–1998) produced vans and ambulances on their base

=== Lithuanian SSR ===
- KAG (1956–1979) produced minibuses based on the GAZ-51 chassis
- VFTS produced rally cars on Lada chassis

=== Russian SFSR ===
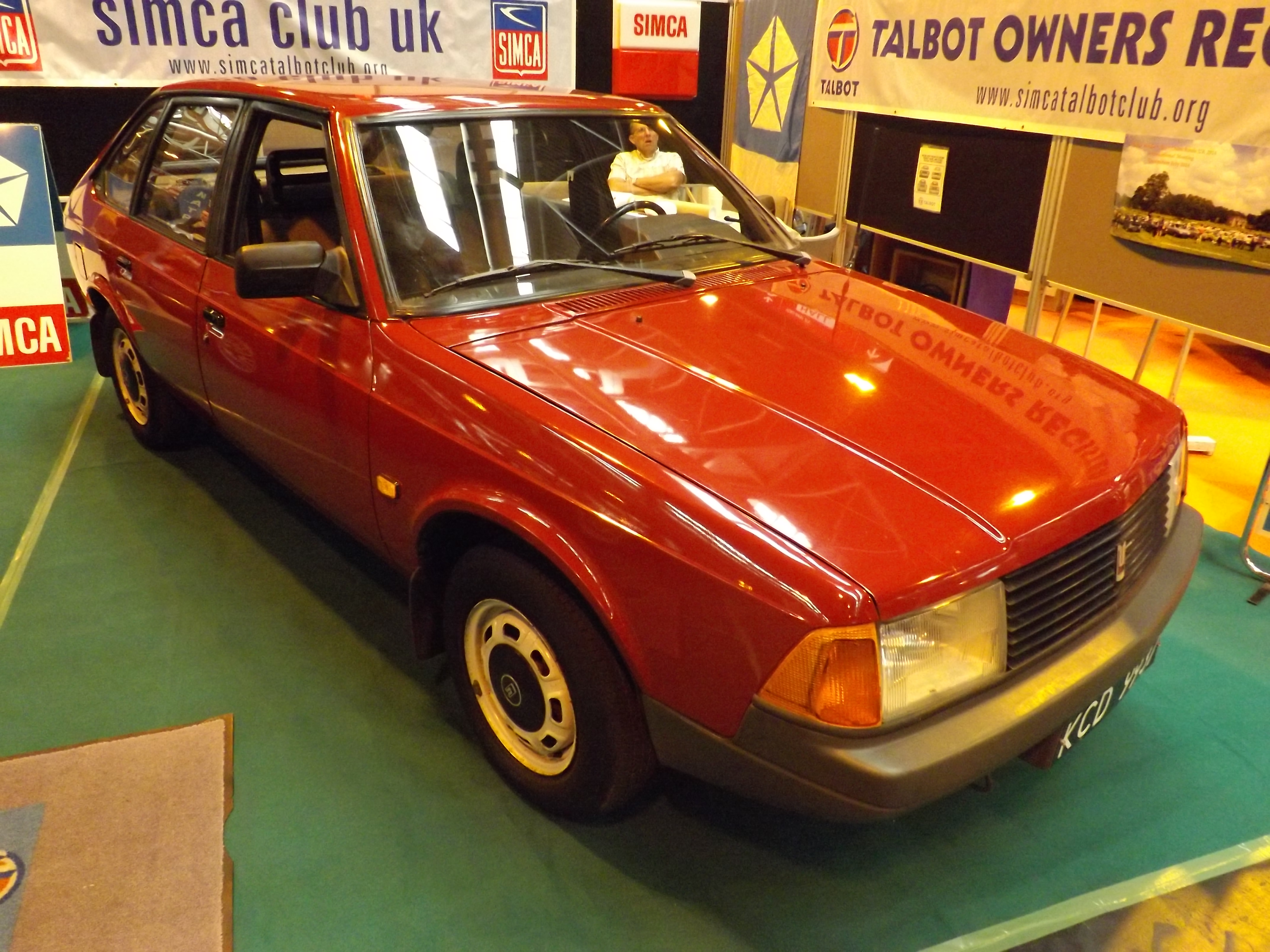
Moskvitch-2141 ALEKO

- Amur (1967-2012, until 2004 UAMZ)
- AvtoKuban (1962-2001) manufactured small buses
- AvtoVAZ (aka Lada, 1966–present) produced up to 800,000 cars annually; created in cooperation with Fiat, it started with the production of the Zhiguli brand, which started as licensed and upgraded variants of the Fiat 124 or Fiat-derived models and later developed cars entirely of its own design, such as the VAZ-2108/2109/21099, the VAZ-2121, and the VAZ-1111.
- AZLK (Moskvitch, 1929-2001, closed in 2010), originally part of GAZ, built durable and easily repairable cars of similar class as VAZ and of its own design (since 1956), but in a significantly smaller numbers (up to 200,000). All of its cars produced between 1946 and 2001 were known under the name Moskvitch.
- BAZ (1958–present) manufactured military superheavy trucks.
- GAZ (Volga, 1932–present) produced light trucks, Volga business-class sedans, which were also used as taxi cabs, and luxury automobiles such as the Chaika for Soviet officials (up to 100,000 cars annually).
- IzhAvto (1967–present, the assembly plant AvtoVAZ since 2012), another manufacturer of Moskvitch small family cars and pickups often used by delivery services (produced up to 200,000 annually).
- KamAZ (1969–present) manufactured heavy 6×4 trucks.
- KAvZ (1958–present) produced conventional small buses on the basis of GAZ trucks, used as company vehicles and for passenger transport in the countryside on roads of poor quality.
- KZKT (1950–2011) manufactured superheavy trucks on MAZ chassis
- LiAZ (1937–present) (not to be confused with the Czechoslovak brand trucks LIAZ) manufactured large city buses.
- NefAZ (1972–present) produced KaMAZ vehicles. Since 2000, it also builds large city buses based on KaMAZ chassis.
- PAZ (1932–present) manufactured small buses
- Prombron (1922–1926), which had acquired control over the former Russo-Balt factory in Fili, produced a small number of modernised Russo-Balt S24 cars. Two of them took part in the All-Russian test run of 1923.
- SMZ, later SeAZ (1939–present, car production stopped in 2008), built cyclecars for the disabled. SMZ cars were distributed in the USSR for free or purchased at a large discount through the Soviet Union's social welfare system.
- UAZ (1941–present) produced light four-wheel-drive vehicles for either military or agricultural use.
- UralAZ (1941–present) manufactured general purpose off-road 6x6 trucks for use in the Soviet Army.
- ZiL (former ZiS and AMO, 1916–2016) built middle trucks, luxury sedans and limousines used as official state cars.
- ZMA (1987–present) produced Oka cars

=== Tajik SSR ===
- Сhkalovsk Bus Plant (1960–1995)

=== Ukrainian SSR ===
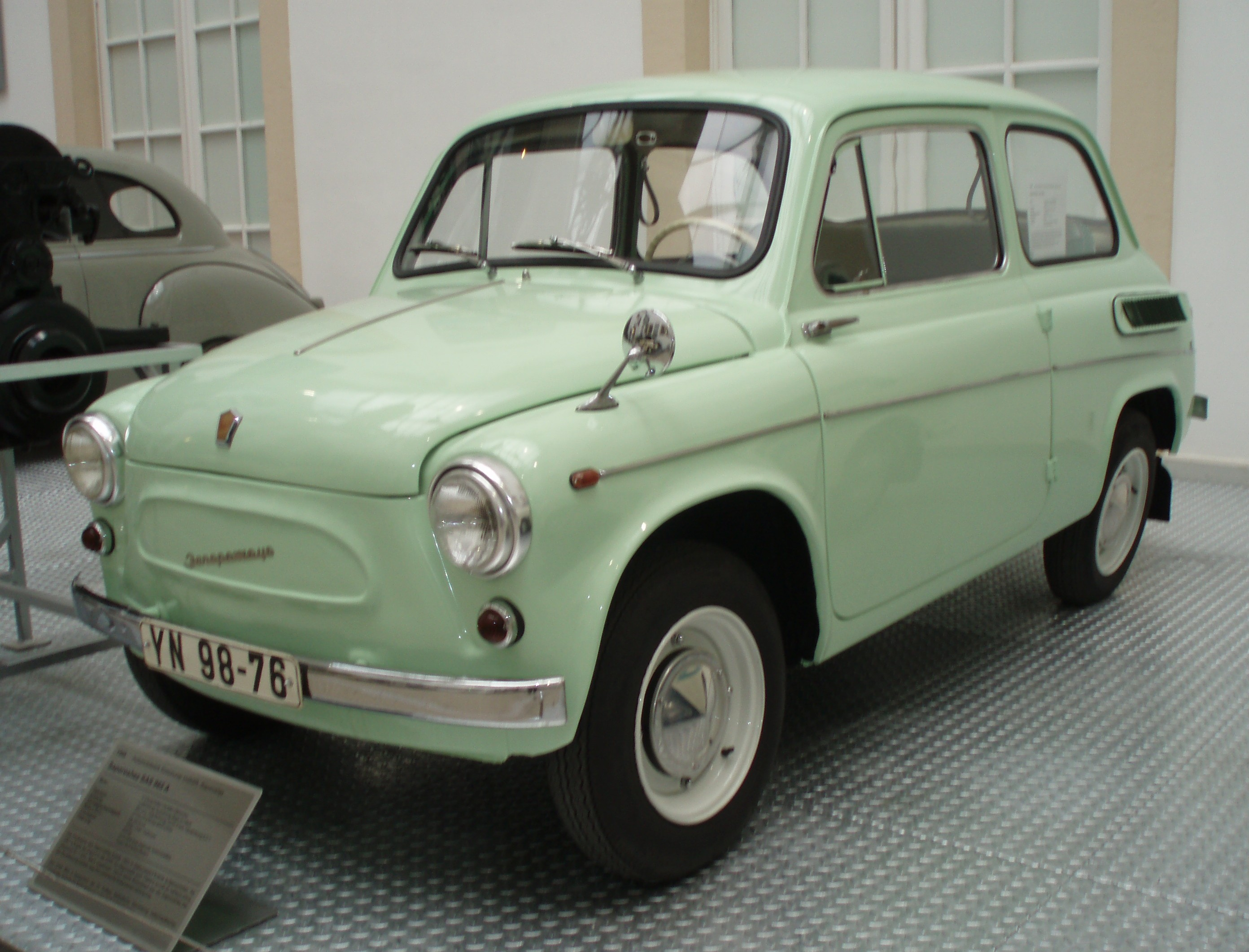
ZAZ-965/965А Zaporozhets

- Chasiv Yar Repair Plant (1958–present)
- KrAZ (1958–present) (truck production of the Yaroslavl Motor Plant at Kremenchuk Harvester Plant) manufactured heavy trucks
- Kyiv (trolleybus model) KZET
- Dnipropetrovetsk Automobile Factory (1944-1955) repurposed into Yuzhmash.
- Yuzhmash YuMZ (1944-present)
- Dnipro Bus Factory (1965-2013)
- Ukravtobusprom
- OdAZ (1948–2013)
- LAZ (1945–2015) produced suburban and intercity buses of middle class.
- LuAZ (1955–present) produced compact four-wheel-drive vehicles (up to 17,000 annually)
- Lugansk Auto Repair Plant (1944–2011)
- Sievierodonetsk Auto Repair Plant (1962–present)
- ZAZ (1923–present) built Zaporozhets and Tavria subcompact budget cars (as many as 150,000 annually)

== See also ==
- Automotive industry by country
- Ministry of the Automotive Industry (Soviet Union)
