= LHN (disambiguation) =

LHN may refer to:

- Longhorn Network, an American regional sports network
- lhn, the ISO 639-3 code for Lahanan language
- Express One International, the ICAO code LHN
- Linhares Regional Airport, the IATA code LHN
- Letshego Holdings Namibia Limited
