= SyFlex =

Cloth simulator computer program

Syflex is a cloth simulator for use in 3D computer graphics. Syflex is available for Maya, Softimage, Houdini and LightWave 3D.
