= Simulation Open Framework Architecture =

Open source framework primarily targeted at real-time physical simulation

SOFA
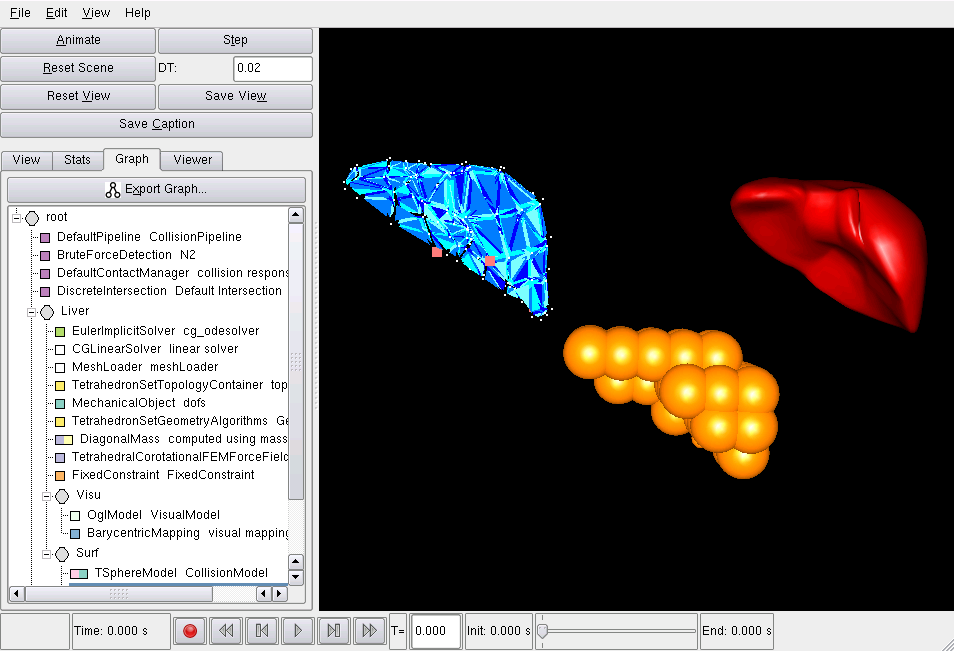
- Developers: Inria, CNRS, USTL, UJF, MGH
- Release: February 2007; 19 years ago
- Stable release: 19.06.01 / 26 July 2019; 7 years ago
- Written in: C++, Python
- Operating system: Linux, Microsoft Windows, OS X
- Type: Physics engine, Medical simulation, Framework
- License: GPL, LGPL
- Website: www.sofa-framework.org
- Repository: github.com/sofa-framework/sofa

Simulation Open Framework Architecture (SOFA) is an open source framework primarily targeted at real-time physical simulation, with an emphasis on medical simulation.

It is mostly intended for the research community to help develop newer algorithms, but can also be used as an efficient prototyping tool or as a physics engine.

== Features ==
Based on an advanced software architecture, SOFA allows users to:

- Create complex and evolving simulations by combining new algorithms with existing algorithms
- Modify most parameters of the simulation (deformable behavior, surface representation, solver, constraints, collision algorithm, ...) by simply editing a XML file
- Build complex models from simpler ones using a scene graph description
- Efficiently simulate the dynamics of interacting objects using abstract equation solvers
- Reuse and easily compare a variety of available methods
- Transparently parallelize complex computations using semantics based on data dependencies
- Use new generations of GPUs through the CUDA API to greatly improve computation times

=== Scene graph ===
A key aspect of SOFA is the use of a scene graph to organize and process the elements of a simulation while clearly separating the computation tasks from their possibly parallel scheduling. The description of a SOFA simulation can easily be done in an XML file. For even more flexibility, a Python plugin allows scripting simulations using the Python language. Basically, a SOFA scene-graph is composed with:

- Nodes: used to categorise the components and keep the XML file clean (mechanical node, collision node, visual node, ...)
- Components: main elements used to build a scene (solver component, forcefield component, rendering component, ...)
- Data: everything that components have to deal with (forces, velocities, positions, ratios, ...)

=== Plugins ===
To extend its capacities and provide more features, SOFA is bundled with a lot of plugins:

- Drivers for VR / haptic / simulation devices (Geomagic®, ARTTrack™, Novint® Falcon™…)
- Visualization and simulation of medical images
- Python scripting
- Parallelization:
  - Multithreading
  - GPU computing using the CUDA API

== Community ==
=== SOFA Day ===
Organized each year, the SOFA Day is a one-day event dedicated to SOFA. This event is open to everyone interested in SOFA, from beginner to advanced users. It contains an introduction to SOFA, several tutorials (adapted to the audience) and a large time to experience SOFA with the help of the instructors.

=== SOFA Consortium ===
Exactly ten years after the first commit in SOFA, Inria founded the SOFA Consortium in December 2015.
The Consortium missions are to:

- Represent the identity of SOFA
- Organize and develop the community
- Distribute and make SOFA more stable

== See also ==
- Graphics processing unit (GPU)
- Soft body dynamics
- Rigid body dynamics
- Collision detection
- VRPN
