= Phyz =

Phyz (Dax Phyz)
- Phyz video capture
- Developer: Firma Stache
- Stable release: 3.34 / August 25, 2022; 3 years ago
- Operating system: Microsoft Windows
- Type: Game engine
- License: Public domain
- Website: phyz.ath.cx

Phyz (Dax Phyz) is a public domain, 2.5D physics engine with built-in editor and DirectX graphics and sound. In contrast to most other real-time physics engines, it is vertex based and stochastic. Its integrator is based on a SIMD-enabled assembly version of the Mersenne Twister random number generator, instead of traditional LCP or iterative methods, allowing simulation of large numbers of micro objects with Brownian motion and macro effects such as object resonance and deformation.

== Description ==
=== Purpose ===
Dax Phyz is used to model and simulate physical phenomena, to animate static graphics, and to create videos, GUI front-ends and games. There is no specified correlation between Phyz and reality.

=== Features ===
- Deformable and breakable objects (soft body dynamics).
- N-body particle simulation.
- Rod, stick, pin, slot, rocket, charge, magnet, heat, actuator and custom constraints.
- Turing complete, real-time logic components (Phyz Logics).
- Explosives.
- Collision and break sound effects.
- Message-based application programming interface.
- Real-time, constraint-aware editing.
- Metaballics effects.
- Bitmap import.
- OpenMP 2.0 support.

=== Platform availability ===
Phyz requires Windows with DirectX 9.0c or later, a display adapter with hardware support for DirectX 9, a CPU with full SSE2 support, and 1 GB of free RAM. The Metaballics effects require a GPGPU-capable display adapter.

== PhyzLizp ==
PhyzLizp, included with Phyz, is an external application based on the Lisp programming language (Lizp 4). It can be used to measure and control events in Phyz, and to create Phyz extensions such as graphical interfaces, network gateways, non-linear constraints or games.

== Screenshots ==
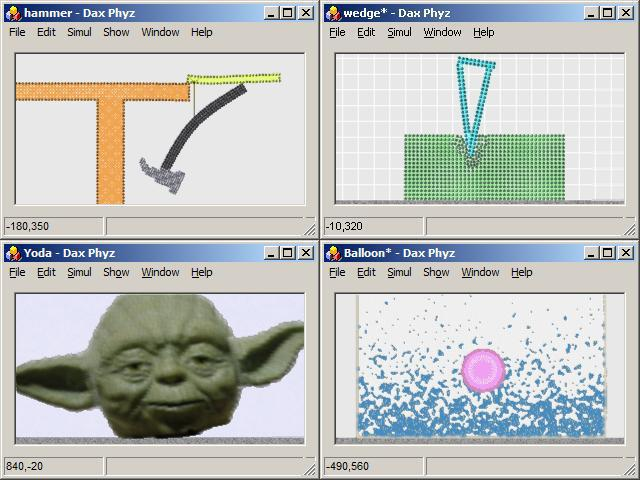

1. Hammer scene (upper left; deformable objects): The hammer's centre of mass is displaced from its rotational axis, creating a torque which keeps the ruler from rotating.
2. Wedge scene (upper right; breakable objects): How to make an impression.
3. Yoda scene (lower left; bitmap import, metaballics): 3.446 vertices and 13.336 rods; the vertices form metaballs with colour information from a photograph of a clay model.
4. Balloon scene (lower right; heat constraints): "Why am I lighter in the water?" Dax asked after a recent swimming lesson. Dax, like balloons, floats since there are more particles pushing on the bottom than on the top, as in buoyancy.

1. Contained Air Burst (N-body particle system, soft body dynamics): 32.068 vertices, 35.283 constraints. After a brief mushroom formation, the semi-spherical shockwaves propagate to the rectangular container walls, where they are reflected, eventually forming a wedge shape in the middle, quickly degrading to a half-sphere under the influence of gravity.

== See also ==
- Electrostatics
- Game physics
- Magnetism
- Physics engines
- Rigid body dynamics
- Soft body dynamics
