= BeamNG.drive =

2013 video game

- Developer: BeamNG GmbH
- Publisher: BeamNG GmbH
- Designers: Thomas Fischer; Lefteris Stamatogiannakis
- Composers: Gabe Fink; Mark Knight
- Engine: Torque 3D
- Platforms: Windows; Linux; PlayStation 5
- Release: Windows; May 29, 2015 (early access); Linux; 2022 (early access); PlayStation 5; October 19, 2026 (early access)
- Genre: Vehicle simulation
- Modes: Single-player, multiplayer

This is the logo for BeamNG.drive.

BeamNG.drive is a sandbox vehicle simulation video game developed and published by Bremen-based video game developer BeamNG GmbH for Windows, Linux, and PlayStation 5. The game features soft-body physics to simulate realistic handling and damage to vehicles. Initially released as a tech demo on August 3, 2013, along with paid access to an alpha, it was later made available on Steam Early Access for Windows on May 29, 2015. The game was released for the PlayStation 5 on October 19, 2026. BeamNG also develops a fork of the game designed for education as well as industrial and academic research entitled BeamNG.tech.

== Gameplay ==
BeamNG.drive features various gameplay modes and scenarios such as career mode, campaigns, time trials, as well as a free roam mode. Campaigns are collections of small scenarios based on specific themes, including races, chases and stunts. In time trials, the player selects a vehicle, map, and route, and competes against their own best time. In free roam, players can explore and experiment with maps, allowing them to operate, place, and manipulate objects and vehicles within the map. They can also change environmental properties such as time, gravity and wind. Players can utilize various objects ranging from road barriers to weapons such as cannons in order to inflict damage on other vehicles. Local multiplayer can also be enabled in any gameplay mode by connecting multiple controllers to the same system. An experimental VR mode is also available with the unstable and in development Vulkan renderer, allowing full stereoscopic 3D VR support.

BeamNG.drive does not include real vehicle manufacturers due to licensing issues; however, some included vehicles resemble various real-life vehicles. With the use of mods, both real and fictional vehicles can be added. Mods can be found either on BeamNG.drive's community forums, BeamNG.drive's in-built online store in-game, or third-party sources. In-game brands and vehicles have various amounts of "lore" attached to them. The vehicle selection is expanded regularly every few updates.

=== Physics ===
An example of a vehicle collision during gameplay in BeamNG.drive. The implementation of soft-body physics allows vehicle damage to be realistically simulated, not only the exterior panels are simulated, damage to the chassis, engine and suspension components is also applied.

BeamNG.drive uses soft-body physics to simulate vehicle dynamics and collisions between objects and vehicles. Algorithms have been created and optimized for the game's physics system. The game relies heavily on code in Lua and uses packets of local data using the Lua network system while the game is running. The game's engine calculates physics equations and problems in real-time during gameplay.

Vehicles in the game consist of a soft-body node-beam structure similar to those in Rigs of Rods. Node-beam structures are represented in a JSON-like text file format, called "JBeam". The physics engine simulates a network of interconnected nodes and beams, which combine to form an invisible skeleton of a vehicle with realistic weights and masses. In terms of soft-body physics, vehicles realistically flex and deform as stress, such as impacts from collisions, is applied to the skeleton. Aside from body deformation, various other types of damage are simulated such as degraded engines, detached doors and shattered windows. If a vehicle is severely damaged or if it runs out of fuel, the engine may fail, rendering the vehicle unusable; additionally, the vehicle will also fail from overloading the driveshaft, clutch, and other important components that can result in catastrophic failure to the vehicle. Tires can be blown out and fuel tanks may explode after enough damage to the rear of the vehicle.

=== Modding ===
BeamNG.drive has native modding support, and mods can be installed from an officially maintained mod repository which can be accessed both from the website and within the game itself. The mod manager allows users to enable/disable installed mods, list possibly broken mods and automatically checks for mod updates. The mod repository's policies prohibit the modification of core game files. The game also accepts mods hosted outside the main repository, however such mods do not get automatically updated by the game mod manager. Online multiplayer may be enabled by the popular mod BeamMP.

== Development ==
In 2011, a group of Rigs of Rods developers gathered and decided to improve upon the open-source software with a spiritual successor. BeamNG opened its website, beamng.com on 8 May 2012 to deliver news of the game's development. On 29 May 2012, BeamNG released a YouTube video entitled "Revolutionary soft-body physics in CryEngine3" that featured the vehicle deformation technology. The video, according to Marketing and Communications manager Nataliia Dmytriievska, got over one million views overnight. Originally, BeamNG.drive was to be based on CryEngine 3 but licencing costs among other issues drove them to the use of a modified version of an open source engine called Torque 3D.

A free tech demo was released on 3 August 2013 along with paid access to an alpha test through FastSpring. The tech demo featured only one vehicle and one map, while the alpha test contained five vehicles and six maps. On 10 September 2013, BeamNG.drive's sixth vehicle, the Bruckell Moonhawk, was released with YouTube premiere. The game was placed on an open vote on Steam Greenlight on 12 February 2014 and was greenlit eight days later. On 29 May 2015, the game was released to Steam Early Access.

On 15 June 2018, BeamNG announced a partnership with New Zealand game development company Camshaft Software, developers of Automation, revealing the addition of an exporter feature that allows players to export vehicles made within Automation as fully drivable vehicles in BeamNG.drive.

On 25 April 2022, BeamNG announced they were ceasing development of the 32-bit branch as of alpha release 0.25. They stated that less than 0.5% of players were using the 32-bit version and that the decision will speed up the game's development and allow the developers to take full advantage of newer technologies.

On 15 June 2022, BeamNG announced experimental support for Linux systems with version 0.25.

On 28 May 2026, a new vehicle and a major graphical upgrade was announced for the version 0.39, with a PlayStation 5 version later in the year. Official multiplayer support was also announced for a later date.

On 24 September 2026, BeamNG announced the release date for the PlayStation 5 version on October 19, 2026 with version 0.40 coming out on the date of its console release.

== Reception ==
BeamNG.drive has received critical acclaim since the game's initial release. Writing for the BBC, Jack Stewart mentioned that BeamNG.drive "has received interest from the film industry to model vehicle stunts so that they can be prototyped and tested exhaustively, but cheaply before a stunt driver smashes up a car on set."

Polygon's Nick Robinson lauded the game's simulated physics and user-created content support, leading him to create a 38-episode video series for Polygon, "Car Boys", in which he and Griffin McElroy showcased community-created content each week.

Automobile magazine praised the game for its diverse vehicle selection and realistic crash physics, saying that "the IIHS has nothing on BeamNG.drive."
