= Rigs of Rods =

Soft-body physics vehicle-simulation game

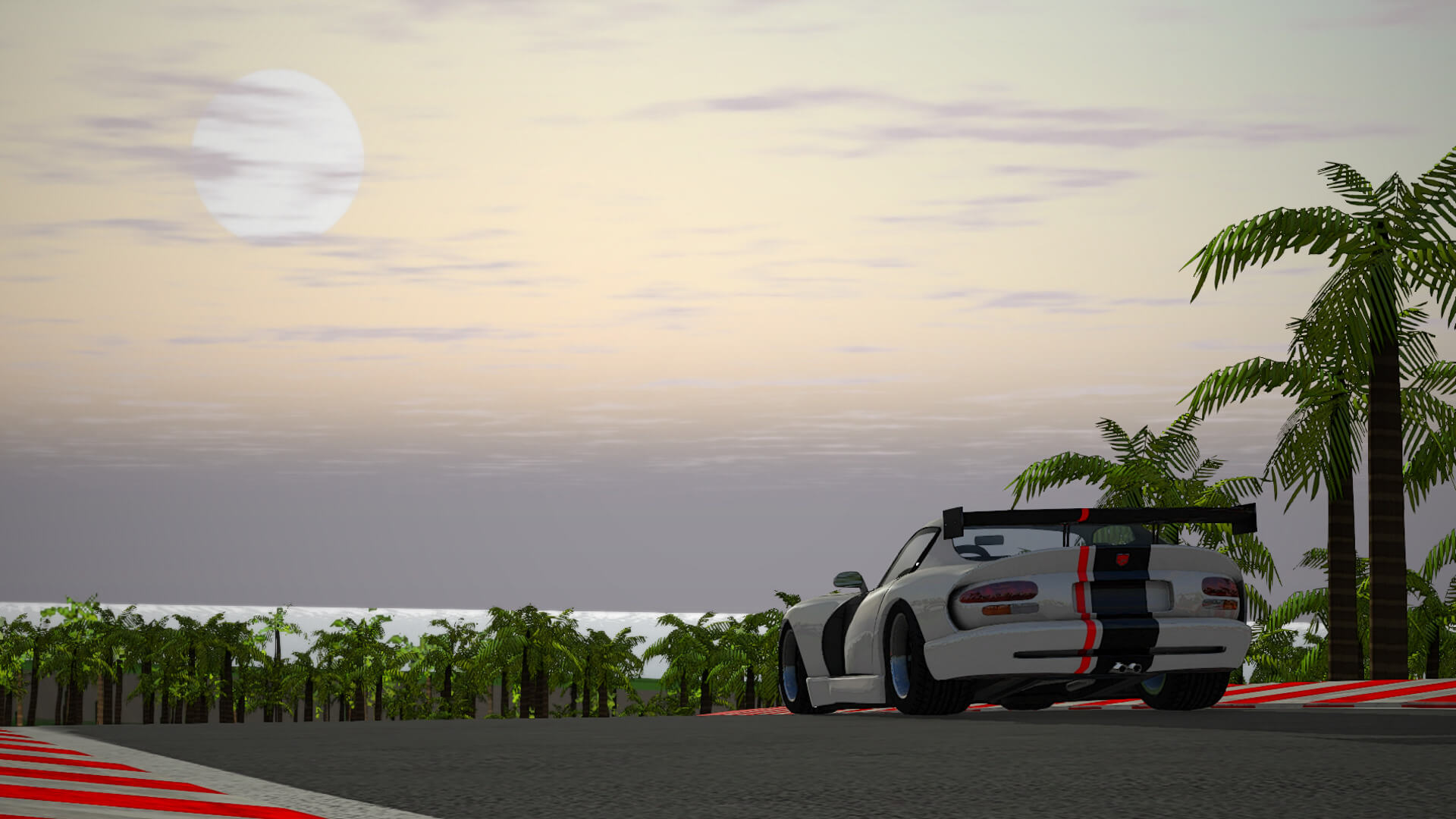
- Screenshot of a Dodge Viper in Rigs of Rods 2021.02
- Original authors: Pierre-Michel Ricordel, Thomas Fischer
- Developers: Petr Ohlidal, Rigs of Rods contributors
- Release: 11 August 2005; 21 years ago
- Stable release: 2026.01 / 3 January 2026; 9 months ago
- Written in: C++, AngelScript
- Engine: OGRE
- Operating system: Linux, Microsoft Windows
- Type: Vehicle simulation game
- License: GPL-3.0
- Website: www.rigsofrods.org
- Repository: github.com/RigsOfRods/rigs-of-rods

Rigs of Rods is a free and open source vehicle-simulation game which uses soft-body physics to simulate the motion destruction and deformation of vehicles. The game uses a soft-body physics engine to simulate a network of interconnected nodes (forming the chassis and the wheels) and gives the ability to simulate deformable objects. With this engine, vehicles and their loads flex and deform as stresses are applied. Crashing into walls or terrain can permanently deform a vehicle until it is reset; however, not all vehicles in the game have flexible bodies.

== Gameplay ==
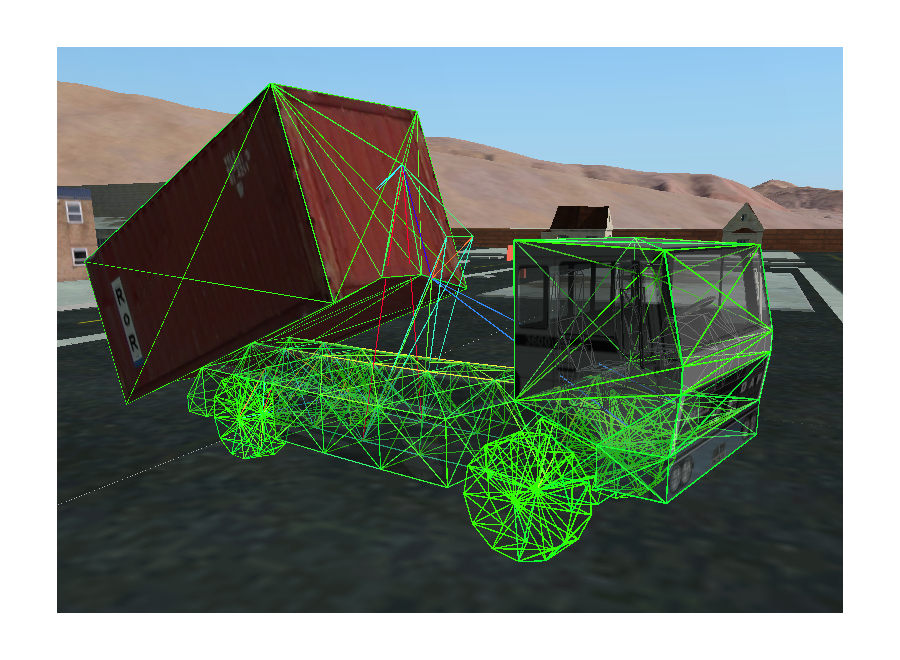
Beam showing the beams on a DAF Ampliroll

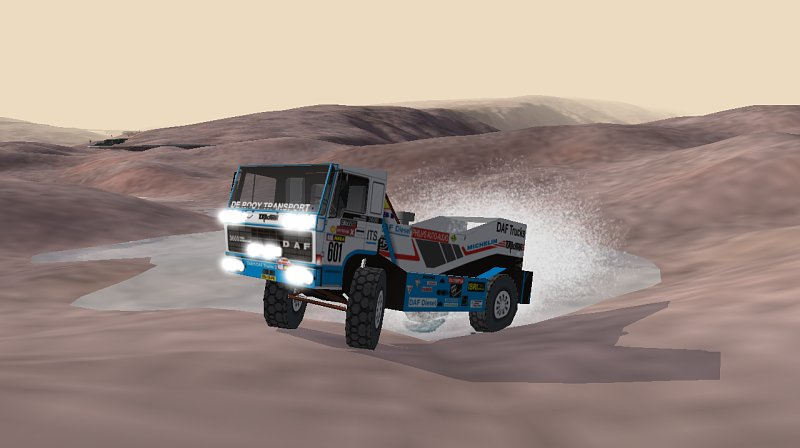
DAF TurboTwin in Rigs of Rods

Rigs of Rods was initially created as an off-road truck simulator, but has developed into a versatile physics sandbox game.

Prior to version 0.28, the game was limited to typical land vehicles with wheels, but plane and boat engines have been added since. All engines allow for a wide range of customization, leaving virtually no boundaries. Vehicles are built using vertices connected by beams. Vertices (or "nodes") are influenced by the stress on the beams that connect them. If a beam is too stressed, it will deform, thus altering the associated nodes position which ultimately alters the appearance and handling of a vehicle. Vehicle configurations are stored in plain text. Simple 2D skins can be made to wrap the vehicle, and can be supplemented with static mesh objects. Recent development has allowed for static meshes to be deformed according to a skeleton of nodes, much like the system in the game 1nsane. This system is known as Flexbody, and has been included since version .36.

The mapping system uses terrain data defined in a raw image file, such as that found in a digital elevation model which can be used to form a realistic surface. Terrains can be made using any other program that can generate a black and white raw image format. This also means that maps can be made from any image.

As a sandbox, Rigs of Rods has no fundamental gameplay goal, but scripting support contributes to missions and game play interaction like the timing of checkpoints along a road or dragstrips. Formerly, Lua was supported as the scripting language and engine, but it has now been replaced by AngelScript since version 0.38. Multiplayer support allows 64 users to simultaneously interact on a playing field.

== Critical reception ==
Physicist Brian Beckman described Rigs of Rods as "one of the best driving simulations I have ever seen." Rigs of Rods was featured in PC Gamer UK in the Christmas 2007 edition. French magazine MicroSim previewed Rigs of Rods in their June 2008 issue. Rigs of Rods author, Pierre-Michel Ricordel, was invited to talk about the game at the French convention, Libre Software Meeting on July 10, 2009.

== Proprietary adaptation ==
In 2011, some Rigs of Rods developers gathered to write a new proprietary video game called BeamNG.drive using the basics from what they had learned making Rigs of Rods. By 2015, BeamNG.drive was released as an Early access release.

== See also ==
- List of open source games
