= Kajaman language =

Austronesian language spoken in Sarawak, Malaysia

Kajaman
- Native to: Malaysia
- Region: Sarawak
- Native speakers: (500 cited 1981)
- Language family: Austronesian: Malayo-Polynesian; North Bornean; Melanau–Kajang; Kajang; Kajaman

Language codes
- ISO 639-3: kag
- Glottolog: kaja1250

Kajaman (Kayaman) is a Kajang language of Sarawak, Malaysia.
