= King Arthur's Gold =

2013 free-to-play action video game

- Developer: Transhuman Design
- Publisher: Transhuman Design
- Programmers: Michal Marcinkowski; Max Cahill
- Artist: Max Cahill
- Platforms: Linux, Windows, OS X
- Release: PAL: 5 November 2013
- Genre: Action

King Arthur's Gold is a free online action game developed and published by Transhuman Design for Windows, Mac and Linux.

== Gameplay ==
King Arthur's Gold (often abbreviated and referred to as KAG) is a game about mining resources, building castles and destroying the player's enemies. It is a side-scrolling 2D pixelated action online multiplayer and offline singleplayer war game with a focus on building by gathering resources, buying and unleashing siege machines, and player vs player combat. There are three playable classes: Knight, Archer, and Builder. Each class has its own role in KAG and works together to defeat the enemy team. Knights excel at close range combat and demolition using bombs and explosive kegs. Archers have superior mobility and a selection of specialized arrows (fire arrows which burn wood and enemies, water arrows with a "splash" effect that stuns enemies, and bomb arrows that destroy blocks and deal splash damage) and a grappling hook that can be used for scaling walls and escaping enemies. Builders erect fortifications block by block, build "shops" (mainly as structures to buy items), lay traps, dig tunnels and initiate escalades.

Some inspirations for the game are Soldat, Minecraft, Dungeon Keeper, Ace of Spades, and King Arthur's World. In KAG, two teams (by default red and blue, though by typing cheat commands in chat other teams of other colors, such as grey, magenta, and green, can be accessed and played) struggle to dominate the other on a giant randomly generated or custom-made 2D map. There are five online multiplayer modes: CTF (Capture the Flag - capture all enemy flags while not letting the enemy capture yours by bringing it back to their flag, and vice versa), TDM (Team Death Match - play as either an Archer or Knight in a 2-minute skirmish), THH (Take the Halls - capture all the halls to win), Sandbox (a free range mode with no objective) and Challenge (an assortment of different minute-spanning challenges, such as kill all enemies, or make it to the end of a map, where at the end of the match a leaderboard is shown along with the best score recorded on that server). The singleplayer mode includes Challenge and Sandbox modes like in multiplayer, along with a basic Tutorials section (Basics, Capture the Flag, and Take the Halls) and the short Save the Princess campaign, where the player fights against a purple-clothed necromancer named Sedgwick.

== Modding ==
The game has extensive modding support. Whole game logic is written in AngelScript and can be easily modified by anyone. Numerous mods have been created, adding new classes, items, and game modes. Total conversion mods also exist, e.g. Shiprekt where players build ships from blocks in a top-down view arena. Players can also create their own custom heads (the only point of customization) and use them along with the official built-in ones (which are mostly human, but a brown pop-eyed horse and zombie one can be found), as long as the modded server supports and recognize it. A few heads are recognized by modded, unofficial, and official games (multiplayer and singleplayer), but those are specially-earned, usually by being part of the development team of King Arthur's Gold. Heads are merely cosmetic, changing nothing, not even the hitbox where damage can be dealt.

== Development ==
The team of THD started working on KAG (King Arthur's Gold) on 18 April 2011, and the first alpha version was released only 3 days later. The public beta was released silently on 1 May, while the real release of the game was on 5 November. KAG is still under active development as of early 2019, the main focus is on bugfixing, adding minor content (now mainly done by volunteers), and supporting the community to develop content itself (make mods for the game).

== Reception ==
The game has positive (84%) reviews on Steam (84%) and received an aggregated score of 81% at Metacritic. As of April 2023 the game has sold over 470,000 copies on Steam. Early critics praised its fast-paced battles and light-hearted approach to medieval combat, while criticizing bugs and poor single player, but countless updates and bug fixes were added since then.
