= AvtoKuban =

- Native name: АвтоКубань
- Type: Government-owned (1962–1991) joint-stock company (1991–2001)
- Industry: Automotive
- Founded: 1962
- Defunct: 2001
- Headquarters: Krasnodar, KDA, Russia
- Products: Buses, minibuses

The Krasnodar mechanical plant of non-standard equipment (Russian: Краснодарский механический завод нестандартного оборудования), commonly known as AvtoKuban (Russian: АвтоКубань), was a Soviet/Russian company that manufactured buses based on truck chassis.

== History ==
The Krasnodar mechanical plant was the first Soviet company that specialised in the production of special vehicles for cultural institutions. For almost thirty years it remained the main manufacturer of theatre buses, mobile clubhouses and libraries in the Soviet Union. In addition to the buses, the plant also built various Kubanets vehicles based on the UAZ-452D between 1966 and 1998.

In 1962, the Soviet government reorganised one of the departments of the Krasnodar industrial enterprise "Rempromkombinat" into the "Krasnodar mechanical plant of non-standard equipment" that would produce medium-sized buses for cultural institutions and citywide agitation. All of its buses were to be built on truck chassis provided by large automobile manufacturers such as GAZ. As the first model had been expected to be built by the end of summer, engineers of the newly created factory built a bus named Kuban-62, which had a wooden frame instead of a metal one and was based on the chassis of the GAZ-51A. This model was used in the city of Krasnodar as mobile clubhouses and bookstores. A year later, it was modernised, demonstrated at an exhibition under the name Kuban-63 and went into mass production. Since there was a need for various special vehicles for the Ministry of Culture, the Krasnodar plant increased the number and variety of automobiles it produced. The overall number of its buses rose from 293 in 1963 to 955 in 1966. New models came off the assembly line, including the mobile clubhouse Kuban-64, the mobile library Kuban-65A, and a four-wheel-drive bus built on the chassis of the GAZ-63. In March 1967, the plant produced the Kuban-66 (G1A), a newer bus with an all-metal frame, that was used as mobile libraries, bookstores, museums, and clubhouses. In the late 1960s, these automobiles were replaced by the newer G2, G3, and G4 models. After having been restyled and built on the chassis of the GAZ-52-04, G1A was renamed to G1A1. Seven years later, a newer bus was created on the basis of the GAZ-53; having a longer chassis and a larger carrying capacity than its predecessor, it eventually replaced the older model.

After the collapse of the USSR, the factory was privatised and renamed to the corporation AvtoKuban. It produced GAZelle-based minibuses but could not compete with larger companies and went bankrupt in 2001.

== Models ==
- Based on GAZ trucks:
  - Kuban-62, Kuban-62A (1962–1963) - buses and mobile clubhouses with wooden framework, built on the basis of the GAZ-51A
  - Kuban-63 (1963–1967) - an upgraded version of the previous model
  - Kuban-64 - a mobile clubhouse
  - Kuban-65A - a mobile library
  - Kuban-66 (G1A) (1967–1975) - a new bus with a metal body
  - Kuban-G1A1 (1975–1982)
  - Kuban-G1A1-01 (1982–1989) - a modernised bus based on the GAZ-53A
  - Kuban-G1A1-02 (1989–1993)
- Based on GAZelle minibuses:
  - Kuban-GAZ-3302 - a flatbed truck
  - Kuban-GAZ-33022 - a van
  - Kuban-GAZ-3232 (1995–2000) - a 14-seater bus
- Based on the UAZ-452D / UAZ-3303:
  - Kubanets-U1, Kubanets-U1A (1966–1985) - a minibus
  - Kubanets-U1A1 (1985–1992)
  - Kubanets-TSK2-08 (1992–1998) - a double cab pickup truck
  - Kubanets-TSK2-09 (1992–1998)
  - KMZ-T12.02 (1986–1995) - a minibus
  - KMZ-TSK2, KMZ-TSK2-01 (1992–1998) - an upgraded version of the previous model
- On the basis of Tata:
  - Kuban-TATA-3225 - a van (1996–2001)
  - Kuban-TATA-2306 - a double cab truck (1996–2001)
  - Kuban-TATA-3787 - a bread van

== Gallery ==
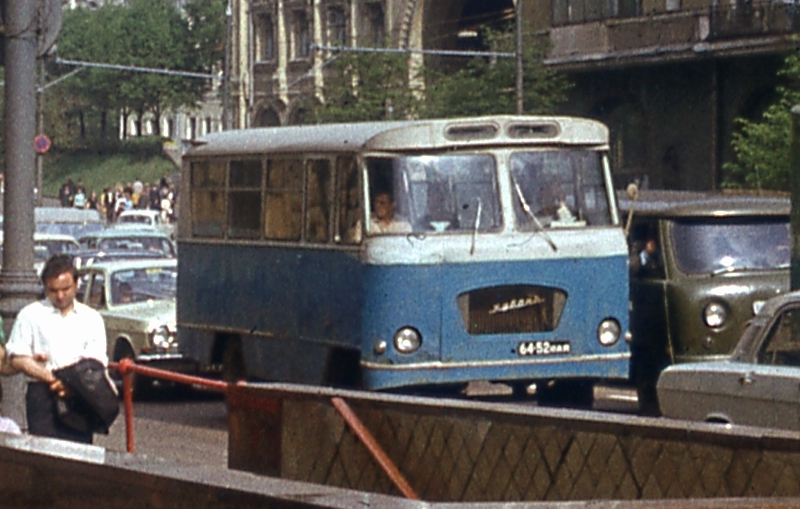
"Kuban-66" (G1A) bus

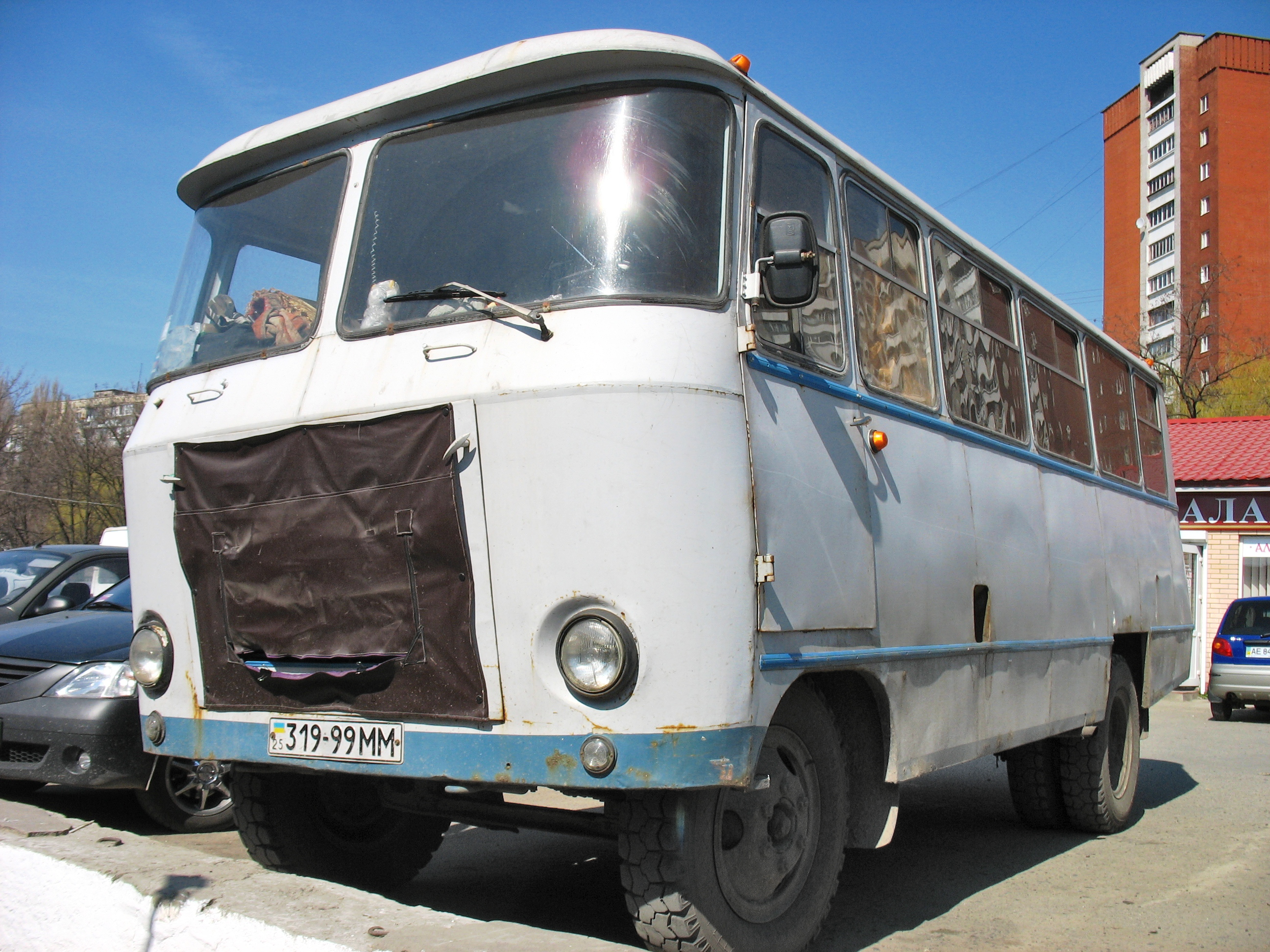
"Kuban" bus, series G1A1-01

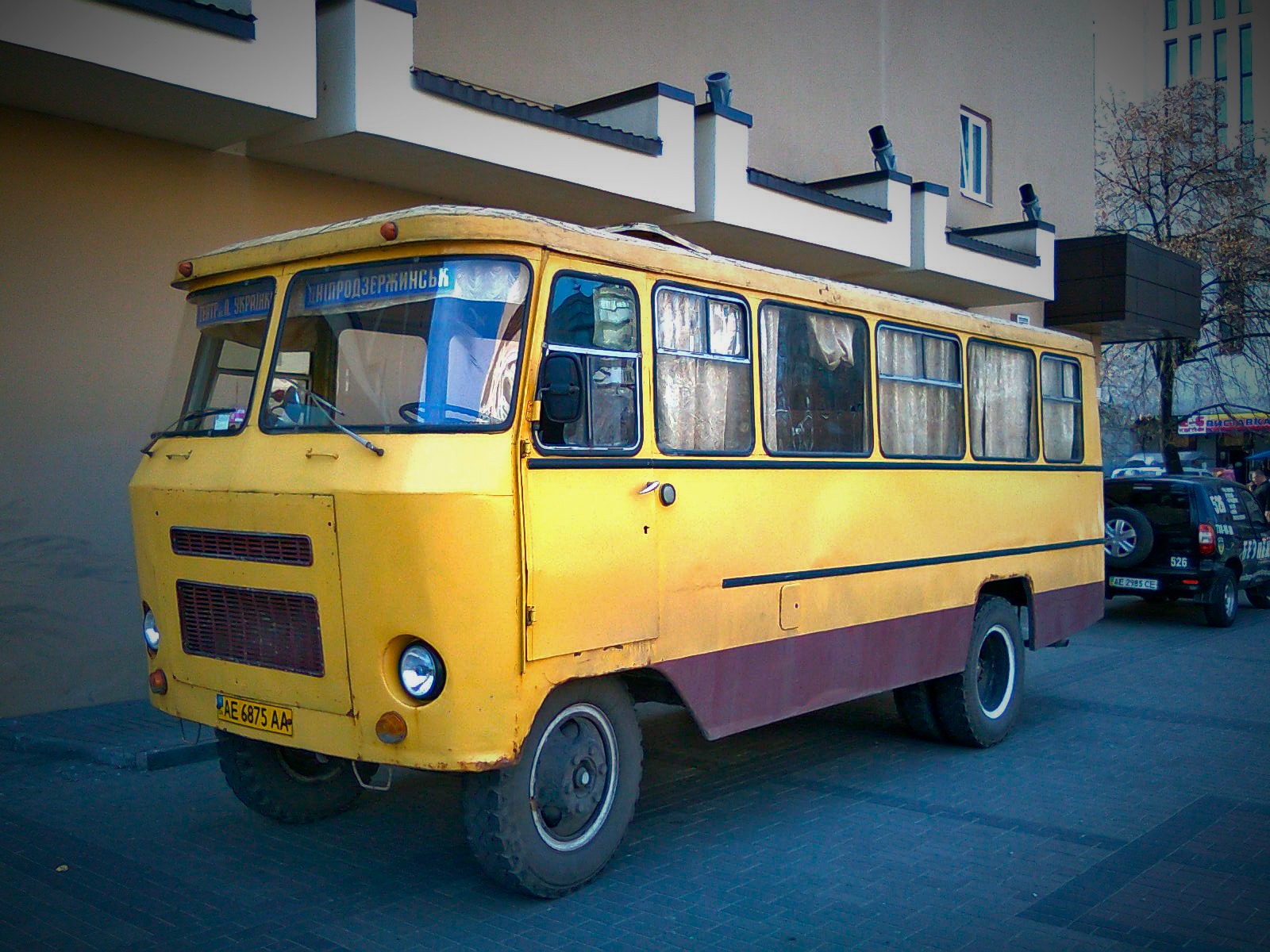
"Kuban" bus, series G1A1-02

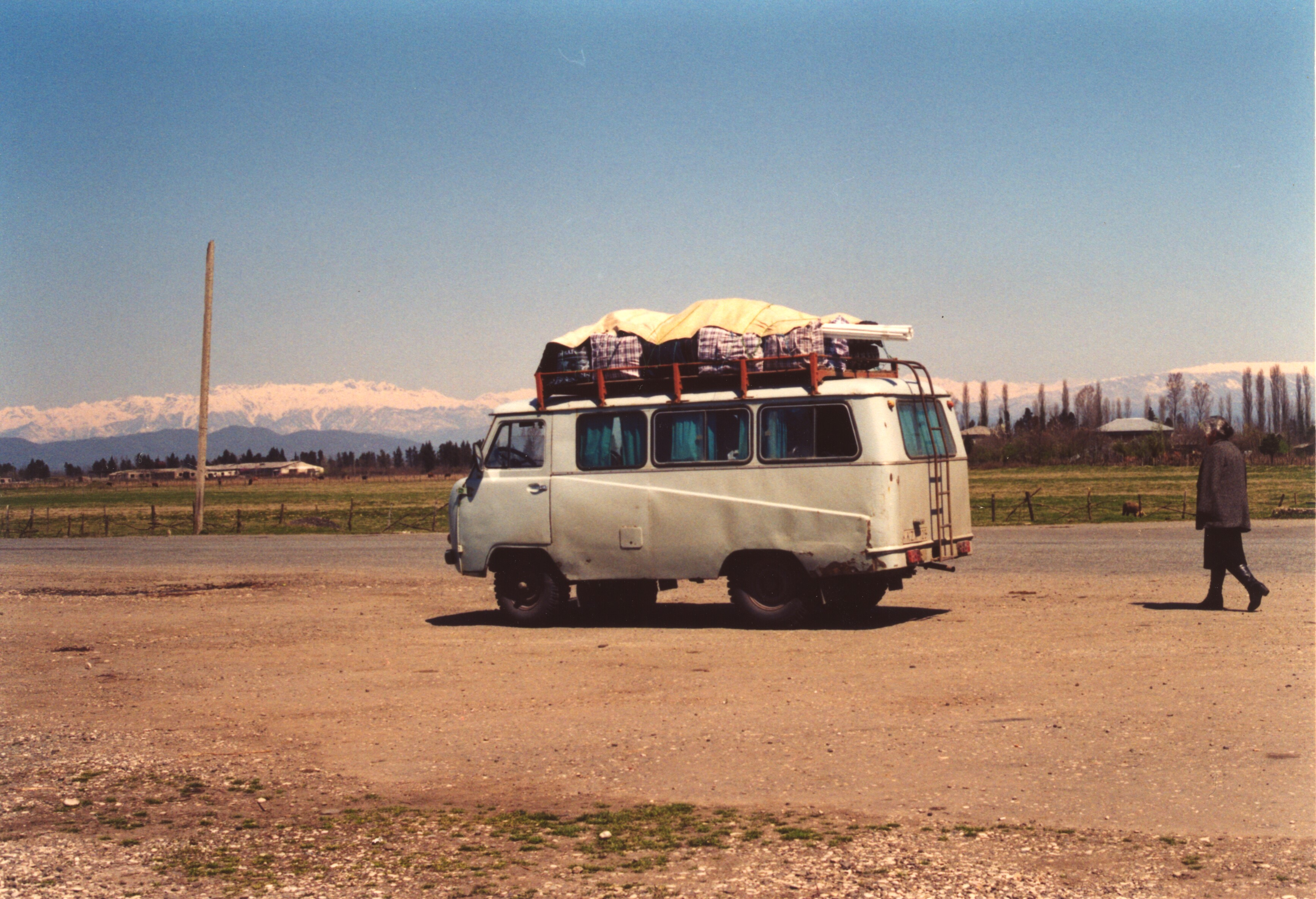
Kubanets-U1A

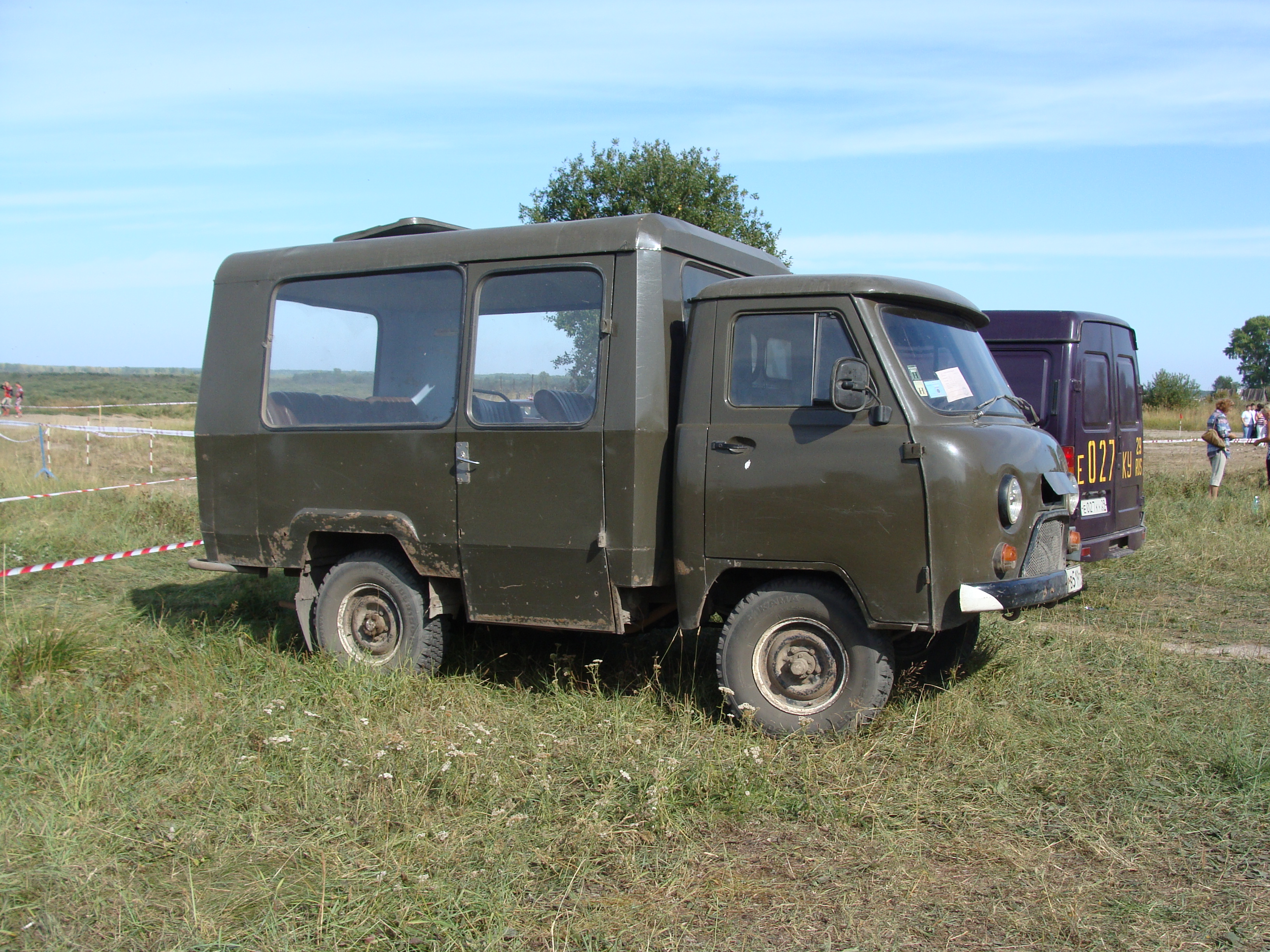
KMZ-T12.02

== See also ==
- List of automobile marques
