= Lahanan language =

Austronesian language spoken in Sarawak, Malaysia

Lahanan
- Native to: Malaysia
- Region: Sarawak
- Native speakers: (350 cited 1981)
- Language family: Austronesian: Malayo-Polynesian; North Bornean; Melanau–Kajang; Kajang; Lahanan

Language codes
- ISO 639-3: lhn
- Glottolog: laha1253

Lahanan (Lanun) is a Kajang language of Sarawak, Malaysia.
