= Kauno autobusų gamykla =

Coordinates: 54°53′46″N 23°54′31″E

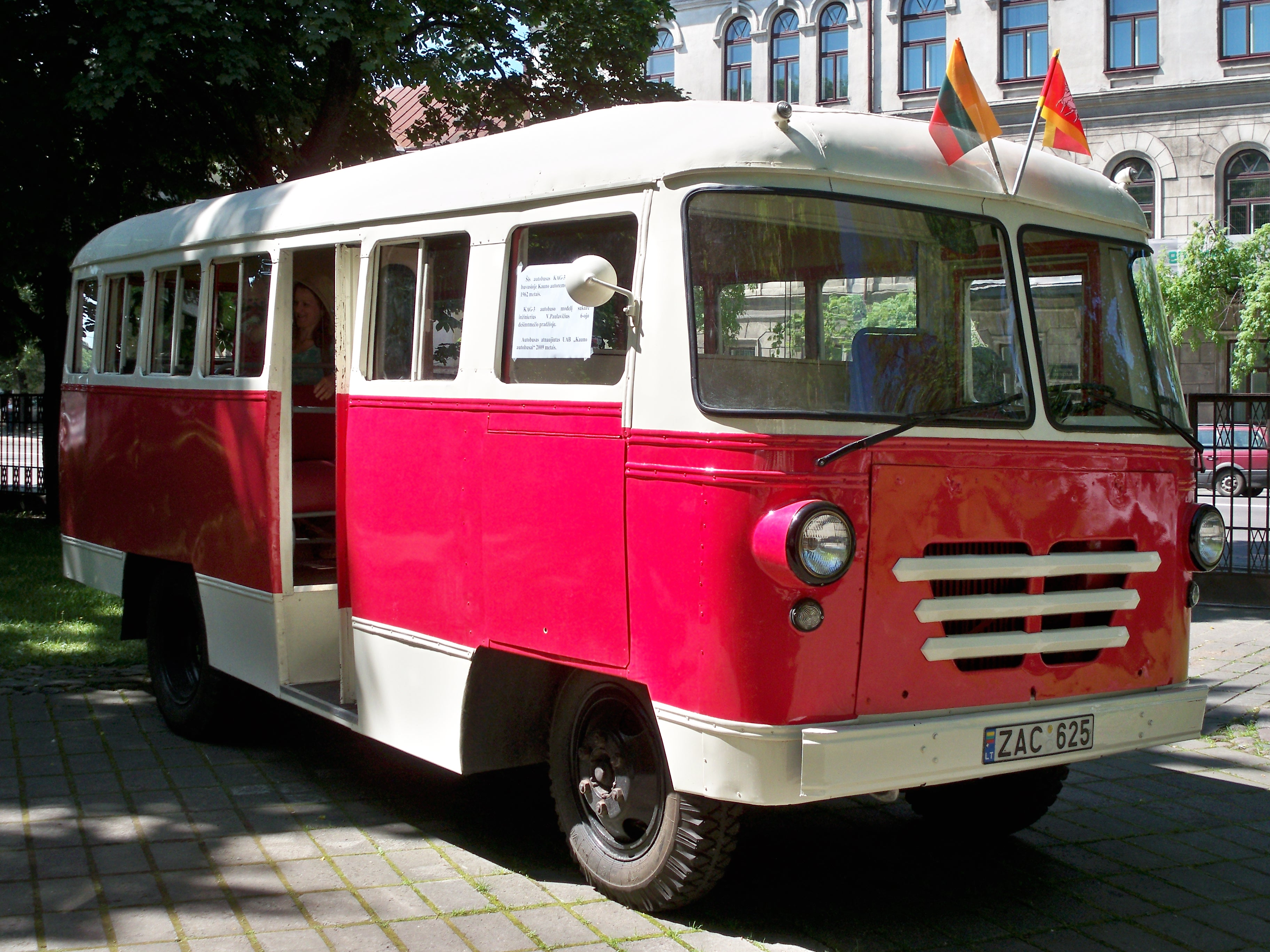
KAG-3 in Kaunas

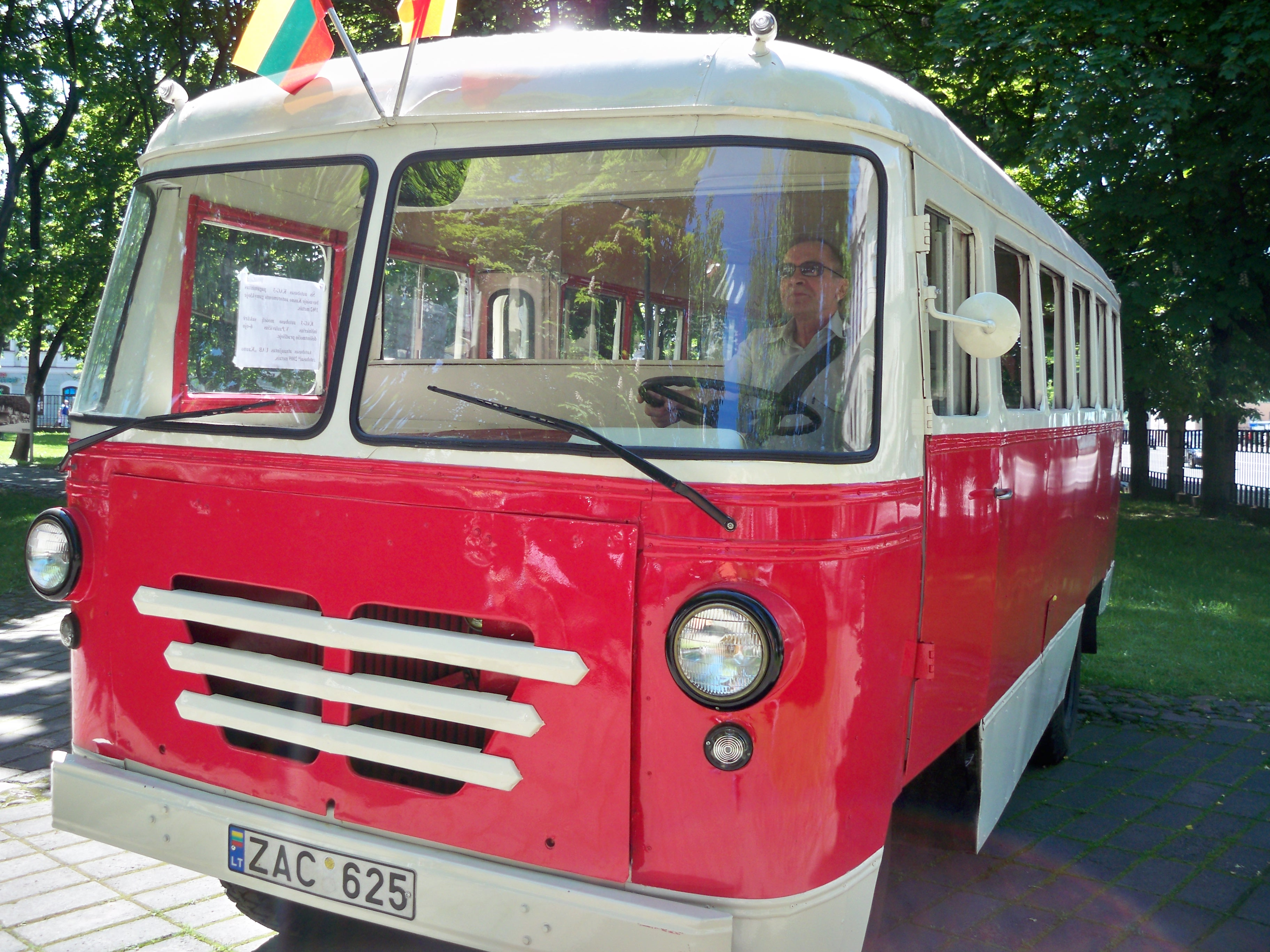
KAG-3 in Kaunas

Kauno autobusų gamykla (transl. Kaunas Bus Factory), abbreviated KAG, was a factory in Kaunas, Lithuanian SSR that produced about 10,000 KAG-3 buses from 1956 to 1990. The buses used chassis of the GAZ-51 truck. The factory then added wooden frames covered with metal sheets. It was the only mass-produced vehicle in Lithuania.

The factory was established in an old workshop owned by Amerikos lietuvių akcinė bendrovė (Lithuanian American Joint Stock Company), abbreviated as Amlit. The company imported Ford cars, Fordson tractors, and bicycles. Around 1929, it started building passenger buses with wooden frames based on Ford chassis. About 25 buses were produced per year. The company was nationalised after Lithuania was occupied by the Soviet Union. After World War II there was a shortage of vehicles and metal. The auto shop, then known as Kauno autoremonto gamykla, started modifying ZIS-150 trucks into L-1 buses that were first designed and produced in Leningrad in 1949.

In 1952, the factory started building KAG-1 passenger buses, which were copies of the Russian GZA-651 buses and were built on the GAZ-51 chassis. The factory improved the model and developed its own KAG-3 bus, though it retained essentially the same specifications. The buses had a six-cylinder, 68 horsepower, 3.5-litre engines. An empty bus weighted 3,890 kilograms (8,580 lb). KAG-3 was the most popular model, with up to 350 vehicles produced per year.

The wooden frame would rot over time, which is why only a couple buses have survived. Examples are preserved in museums in Kaunas and Vievis, as well as by a classic car club in Kaunas. The wooden frame could also easily catch fire in an accident. One of the largest accidents occurred in winter 1966, when a crowded bus drove into a ditch and caught fire on the road from Luokė to Smilgiai. 21 people died in the accident, four others suffered severe burns. Due to safety concerns, the buses were phased out from passenger transport and converted into cargo or utility vehicles. However, the KAG buses remained in demand even after metal frame buses (such as PAZ-652) became available. The wooden frame could be replaced (some buses had 3 or 4 frame changes) and performed better on uneven roads (such as roads of the Caucasus).

== Models ==
The factory produces these models:

- KAG-1 (19 passengers) – very similar to the Russian GZA-651 buses
- KAG-3 (23 seated passengers plus 7 standing passengers)
  - KAG-31 (KAG-3 based cargo van)
  - KAG-32 (KAG-3 based bread van)
  - KAG-33 (KAG-3 based technical service van)
  - KAG-34 (KAG-3 based explosive materials van)
  - KAG-317 (KAG-3 based household service van)
- KAG-4 (24 passenger) – two experimental vehicles with all metal frames produced in 1959
  - KAG-41 (KAG-4 based cargo van) – one experimental vehicle with all metal frame produced in 1959
