= Lego Star Wars: Summer Vacation =

2022 animated Star Wars special

- Genre: Animation; Space opera
- Based on: Star Wars by George Lucas
- Developed by: David Shayne; James Waugh; Jason Cosler; Josh Rimes; Leland Chee
- Written by: David Shayne
- Directed by: Ken Cunningham
- Starring: "Weird Al" Yankovic; Allie Feder; Anthony Daniels; Ashly Burch; Billy Dee Williams; Helen Sadler; Kelly Marie Tran; Kyliegh Curran; Jake Green; Omar Miller
- Composer: Michael Kramer
- Country of origin: United States
- Original language: English

Production
- Executive producers: Jason Cosler; Jacqui Lopez; Keith Malone; Josh Rimes; David Shayne; Jason D. Stein; Jennifer Twiner McCarron; James Waugh; Jill Wilfert
- Producers: Daniel Cavey; Dan Langlois
- Editor: Damon Fulford
- Running time: 48 minutes
- Production companies: Lucasfilm Animation; The Lego Group; Atomic Cartoons

Original release
- Network: Disney+
- Release: August 5, 2022

Related
- The Lego Star Wars Holiday Special; Lego Star Wars: Terrifying Tales

Lego Star Wars: Summer Vacation is a 2022 animated special based on the Star Wars franchise, and produced by Lucasfilm Animation and The Lego Group alongside Atomic Cartoons. Like The Lego Star Wars Holiday Special, it is directed by Ken Cunningham from a script written by David Shayne. A stand-alone sequel to the Star Wars sequel trilogy, the special was released on Disney+ on August 5, 2022.

== Plot ==
Following the events of Star Wars: The Rise of Skywalker, Finn, Rey, Poe, Chewbacca, BB-8, R2-D2 and C-3PO seek a relaxing summer vacation aboard Lando Calrissian's luxury Halcyon starcruiser. After being separated from the group on Calrissian's starcruiser, Finn talks to the Force ghost of Obi-Wan Kenobi. Kenobi tells Finn of his previous summer adventures. With Lt. Valeria, a younger Obi-Wan dressed in a Hawaiian shirt sneaks into Jabba the Hutt's Palace on Tatooine in order to steal coaxium. Kenobi was originally meant to act as a distraction for Jabba but he performs a musical number called "Gamorrean Girls" alongside Jabba's dancer Sy Snootles.

Anakin Skywalker's Force ghost tells Finn about a trip he once took Emperor Palpatine to as Darth Vader during Empire Day (which was after the events of Star Wars: Episode III – Revenge of the Sith). He takes him to the planet of Scarif, where the original Death Star plans were held.

Princess Leia's Force ghost tells Finn about a trip she and Han Solo took the young Ben Solo on when he was a child before receiving Luke Skywalker's Jedi training. While traveling to Mimban, where Han first met Chewbacca, Ben is unimpressed. Wanting to impress him, Han takes him to the forest moon of Endor, where the Battle of Endor took place. They are greeted by resort owner Wick Cooper, whose daughter Ben has a crush on. A show-off joins them and belittles Ben for being short. After taking the Millennium Falcon, Ben flies at the ground and after dropping off Wick's daughter, Han, Leia, C-3PO, R2-D2, and Chewbacca drop Ben off at Luke's Jedi Academy.

== Voice cast ==
- "Weird Al" Yankovic as Vic Vankoh
- Omar Miller as Finn
- James Arnold Taylor as Obi-Wan Kenobi, Jawa
- Matt Lanter as Anakin Skywalker, Rodian
- Matt Sloan as Darth Vader
- Ross Marquand as Han Solo
- Shelby Young as Princess Leia Organa
- Trevor Devall as Emperor Palpatine, Wuher, Mon Calanari, Imperial Officer
- Matthew Wood as Ben Solo / Kylo Ren, Resort Guest #1
- Allie Feder as Sy Snootles
- Anthony Daniels as C-3PO
- Ashly Burch as Mahinor, Tour Droid
- Billy Dee Williams as Lando Calrissian
- Dee Bradley Baker as Boba Fett, BV-RJ, Wicket
- Eric Bauza as Luke Skywalker, Stormtrooper
- Helen Sadler as Rey
- Jake Green as Poe Dameron
- Kelly Marie Tran as Rose Tico
- Kevin Michael Richardson as Jabba the Hutt
- Kyliegh Curran as Sidero
- Paul F. Tompkins as Rad
- Thomas Lennon as Wick Cooper
- Yvette Nicole Brown as Colvett Valeria

== Release ==
Lego Star Wars: Summer Vacation was first announced on May 27, 2022, at Star Wars Celebration. It was released on Disney+ on August 5, 2022.

=== Marketing ===
A teaser trailer for Lego Star Wars: Summer Vacation was released on June 18, 2022. The full-length official trailer for the special was released on June 23, 2022. Lucasfilm released the official poster in July 2022 alongside showing a one-minute clip to the audience of San Diego Comic-Con On July 24. The clip was released to the public the following day.

== Reception ==
The review aggregator website Rotten Tomatoes reported an approval rating of 88%, with an average rating of 6.7/10, based on 8 reviews.

Maggie Lovitt of Collider gave it an A grade and wrote: "Meta-filled mayhem that plays on some of the corniest and most familiar Star Wars tropes is the perfect piece of cinema for long summer nights." Tara Bennett of IGN gave it 7 out of 10 and wrote: "LEGO Star Wars Summer Vacation wraps up the trilogy of sequel character specials with an emotional conclusion and some very funny summer riffs on beloved characters." CineMovie gave it a B+ grade. The Times rated it 1 out of 5 and called it "another dud".
