= The Hunt for Ben Solo =

Unproduced film from Steven Soderbergh

The Hunt for Ben Solo is an unproduced American space opera film that was to be directed by Steven Soderbergh and produced by Lucasfilm. The screenplay was written by Scott Z. Burns from a story by Soderbergh and Rebecca Blunt. (Note: "Rebecca Blunt" is a pseudonym for Jules Asner, the wife of director Steven Soderbergh.) It would have been part of the Star Wars franchise, focusing on Adam Driver's Ben Solo following his apparent death during the events of the film Star Wars: The Rise of Skywalker (2019).

Lucasfilm president Kathleen Kennedy approached Driver in 2021 to ask if he was open to reprising his role in a future film. Driver expressed interest, and shared an idea for such a film with his Logan Lucky (2017) director Soderbergh. A full treatment and beat sheet were developed by Soderbergh and Blunt, and Burns was hired to write the screenplay. The film reached a stage where the script was finalized and early pre-production was beginning. Lucasfilm then presented the project to Disney executives, who decided not to move forward with it. This was the first time Disney rejected a finalized screenplay that had been approved by Lucasfilm.

Driver and Soderbergh publicly revealed the first details about The Hunt for Ben Solo in October 2025, after it was classified internally at Lucasfilm as "dead". This revelation led to calls from some Star Wars fans for the project to be revived. Some commentators felt the project could have worked due to Driver and Soderbergh, while others thought it was best to not revisit the character after The Rise of Skywalker.

== Development ==
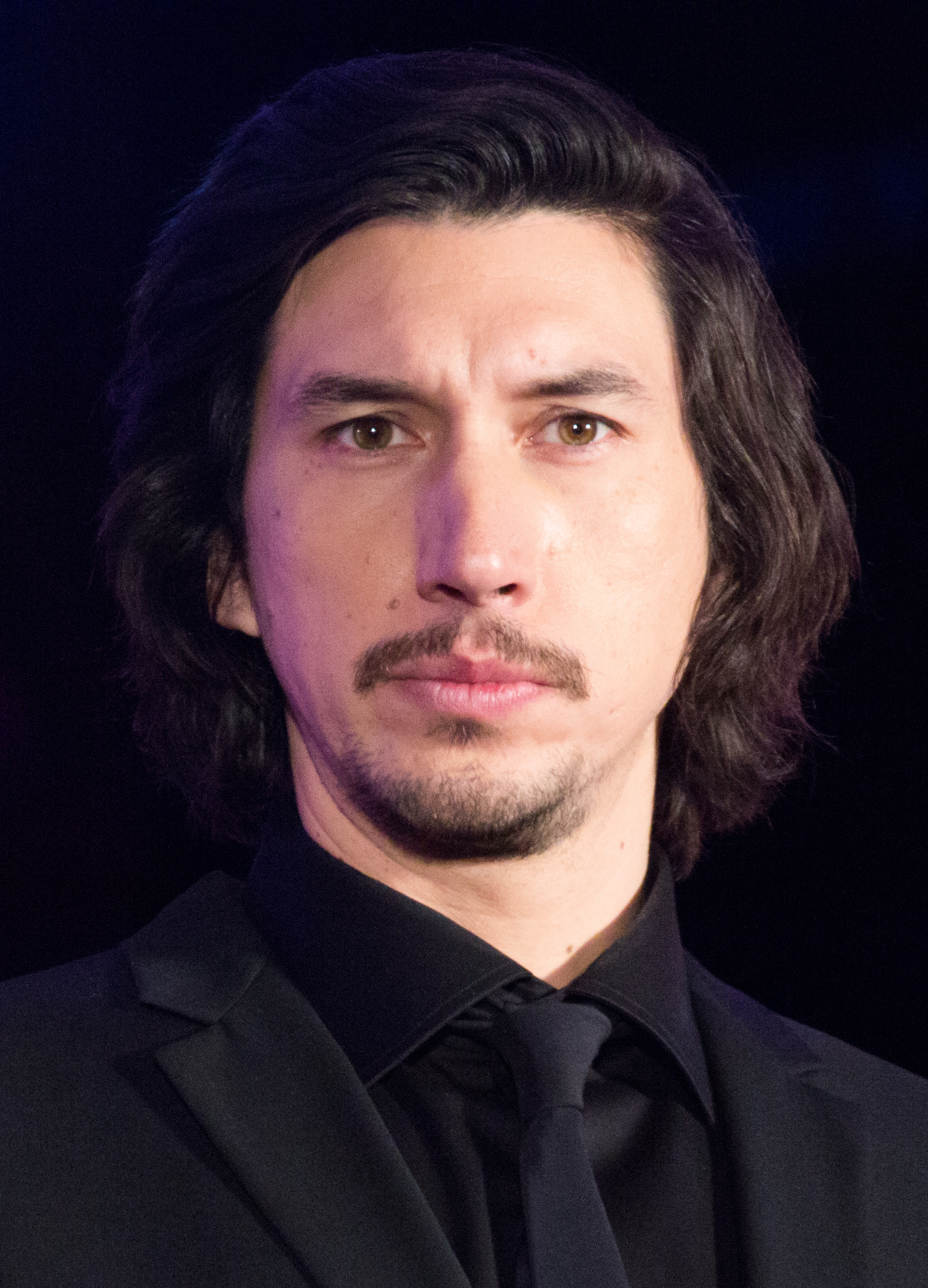
Adam Driver promoting the Star Wars sequel trilogy. He was first approached about returning as Ben Solo for a new film in 2021.

Following the financial failure of the Star Wars spin-off film Solo: A Star Wars Story (2018), and the end of the Star Wars sequel trilogy—consisting of the films Star Wars: The Force Awakens (2015), Star Wars: The Last Jedi (2017), and Star Wars: The Rise of Skywalker (2019)—Disney and Lucasfilm reconsidered the franchise's film output and began prioritizing series for the streaming service Disney+ instead. Lucasfilm did begin work on several potential new Star Wars films, but were taking their time to get them right. In 2021, Lucasfilm president Kathleen Kennedy asked Adam Driver if he was open to reprising his sequel trilogy role of Ben Solo / Kylo Ren in a future film. Driver was interested as long as the film had "a great director and a great story", and said he "loved that character and loved playing him". Although the character apparently dies during The Rise of Skywalker, Driver felt there was "unfinished business" due to changes in his character arc across the trilogy. The Force Awakens director J. J. Abrams originally envisioned the villainous Kylo Ren as having the opposite journey to his grandfather, Darth Vader. Driver explained:

Vader starts the most confident and the most committed to the dark side. And then by the last movie [of the Star Wars original trilogy], he's the most vulnerable and weak. [Abrams] wanted to start with the opposite [for Kylo Ren]. This character was the most confused and vulnerable, and by the end of the three movies, he would be the most committed to the dark side.

An early version of the sequel trilogy's final film, known as Star Wars: Duel of the Fates, followed this arc. However, plans changed when director Colin Trevorrow left that film and was replaced with Abrams, who reworked it into The Rise of Skywalker. The final version features a redemption story for Kylo Ren, who reverts to the heroic Ben Solo before apparently dying.

Driver approached Steven Soderbergh, who directed him in the film Logan Lucky (2017), with an idea for a film that would follow Ben Solo after his apparent death in The Rise of Skywalker. Titled The Hunt for Ben Solo, it would reveal that the character has survived and his whereabouts would be the film's central mystery. It was unclear whether other characters from the sequel trilogy, such as Daisy Ridley's Rey, would also appear. Soderbergh developed a full treatment and beat sheet for the project with Rebecca Blunt, which was purchased by Disney. Scott Z. Burns, who did uncredited writing work on the film Rogue One: A Star Wars Story (2016), was hired to write the screenplay. Burns was paid more than any screenwriter in Lucasfilm history; journalist Jeff Sneider reported that he was paid $3 million. Kennedy, Lucasfilm vice president Carrie Beck, and Lucasfilm chief creative officer Dave Filoni were directly involved in the project's development and responded positively to Burns's script drafts. Driver said the trio "loved the idea. They totally understood our angle and why we were doing it." Lucasfilm chose to wait until the film was ready to move forward before presenting it to Disney.

Driver wanted to make the film "in the same spirit" as previous entries in the franchise, which he described as feeling "handmade and character-driven". He felt the film The Empire Strikes Back (1980) was the standard to aim for. The project eventually reached a stage where the script was finalized and early pre-production and staffing were beginning under the working title Quiet Leaves. A "design sprint" took place with Lucasfilm designers.

== Cancellation ==
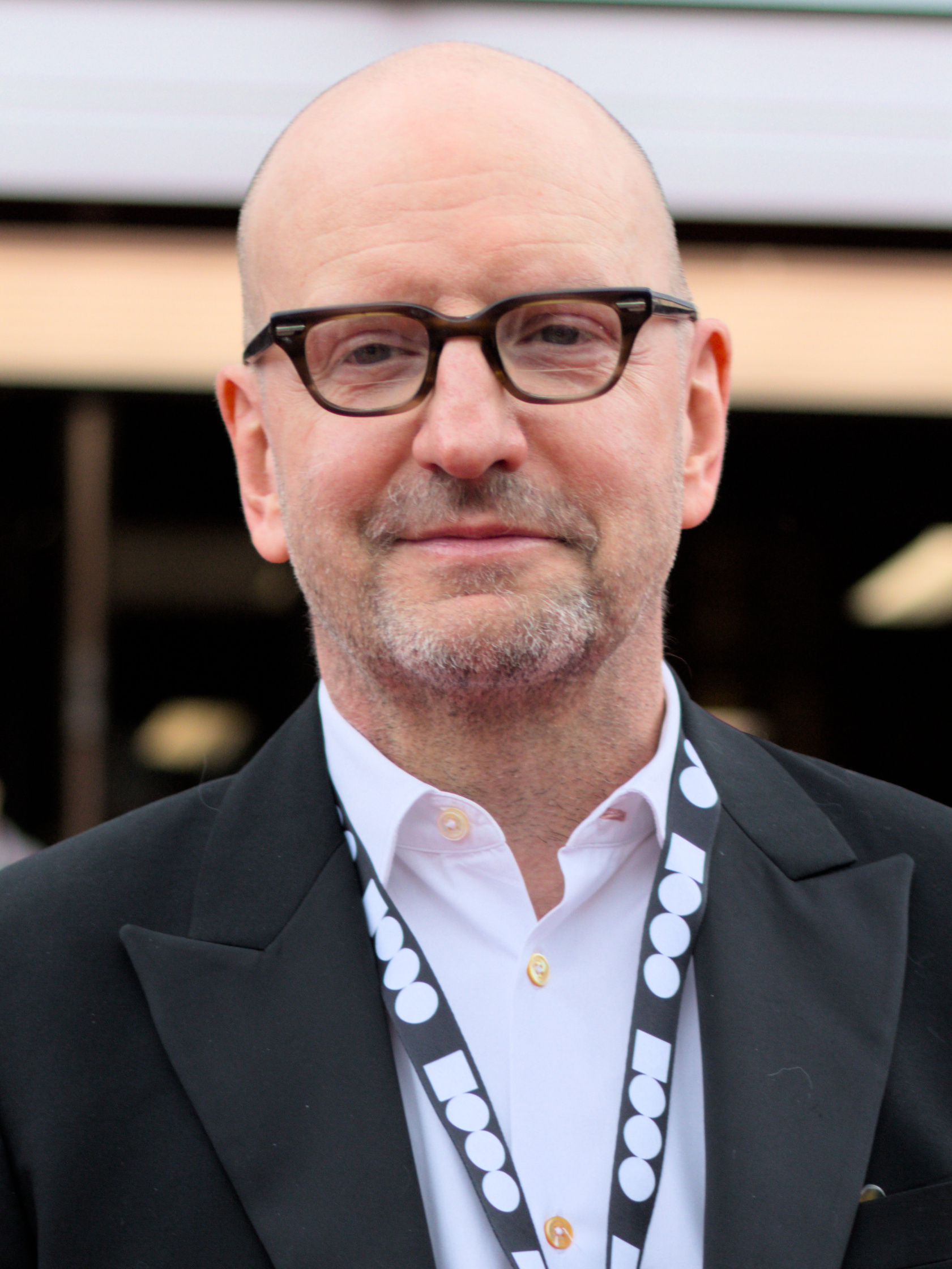
Steven Soderbergh co-wrote the story and was set to direct The Hunt for Ben Solo before it was cancelled.

Lucasfilm presented the final script, budget, and proposed start of filming to Disney CEO Bob Iger and Disney Entertainment co-chair Alan Bergman. Bergman reportedly took an unusually long time to read the script, and the pair ultimately decided not to move forward with the film. This was the first time Disney rejected a finalized screenplay that had been approved by Lucasfilm. Driver said the Disney executives' primary concern was confusion about how Ben Solo could be alive after The Rise of Skywalker. This surprised Lucasfilm executives, who felt that "the story's logic was clear and creatively sound". Rodrigo Perez at The Playlist reported that individuals close to the project believed the decision was motivated by internal Disney politics related to Iger's succession plans. Sneider reported that the budget was $200 million, and both Iger and Bergman felt it would be a risk to spend so much on a film directed by Soderbergh and starring Driver. In contrast, Driver stated that they planned to be "judicial" with how much was spent on the film, wanting to make it for "less than most" while still matching what was done with the previous films.

Driver stated in January 2024 that he would not be returning to the Star Wars franchise, saying "the character's done" and "I'm not doing any more". In October 2025, Driver and Soderbergh publicly revealed the first details about The Hunt for Ben Solo. Until that point, all work on the film had taken place quietly and gone unreported. Some commentators questioned whether the pair had gone public as a way to pressure Disney into reviving the project. Germain Lussier at Gizmodo compared the situation to actor Ryan Reynolds leaking test footage for the film Deadpool (2016), which was well received by fans and led to that film being given an official greenlight. However, multiple reports stated that this was not the case and there were no plans for Driver to return to the franchise. Rather, he and Soderbergh decided to discuss the project publicly because it had been classified internally at Lucasfilm as "dead" and they were therefore no longer bound by non-disclosure agreements or other contractual restrictions. Driver said the film had one of the coolest scripts he had been involved with and he was perplexed why Disney would not want to move forward with a Soderbergh-directed Star Wars film. Soderbergh stated that he "really enjoyed making the movie in my head. I'm just sorry the fans won't get to see it."

In January 2026, following the announcement that she was leaving Lucasfilm and being succeeded by Filoni and Lynwen Brennan, Kennedy publicly acknowledged the project's revelation and praised Burns's script. She described the film as being "on the back burner" but said it could move forward "if somebody's willing to take a risk". A month later, Soderbergh reiterated his frustration with Disney's decision, saying he spent two-and-a-half years developing the film and fully expected to spend the next two years making it when Disney canceled the project. He thought the company would have practical concerns about how the film would be made and how much it would cost, and had answers ready for those questions, but never got to have that discussion. In April, Soderbergh added that he was not interested in reviving the project under the new Lucasfilm leadership, explaining that he had moved on to other projects and believed "if it was gonna happen, it would have happened". Filoni confirmed in August that the film would not be made.

== Reception ==
The public revelation of The Hunt for Ben Solo's development and cancellation led to negative responses from some Star Wars fans who wanted to see the film, especially due to Driver's investment and Soderbergh's involvement. Mark Elibert at Complex described the reaction as a "fan backlash". Aaron Couch and Borys Kit, writing for The Hollywood Reporter's Heat Vision newsletter, said the revelation "sent fans into hyperdrive" and the story was "clearly sticking around... Star Wars fans have a hard time of letting things go". In the following days, fans hired a plane to fly over Walt Disney Studios with a banner that read "Save #TheHuntForBenSolo", and paid for a billboard in New York City's Times Square to show a message of support for the project, wanting to indicate Ben Solo's popularity and the wish of some fans for the project to be revived to Disney. Another fan put up "Ben Solo Missing" posters around Los Angeles which were subsequently shown around the world in more than 11 languages, and paid for more Times Square billboards which were shown in January 2026 in view of Disney's store. These actions were compared to the #ReleaseTheSnyderCut fan movement which led to the release of Zack Snyder's Justice League (2021), a director's cut of the film Justice League (2017).

Discussing the cancelled project for Total Film, Bradley Russell opined that Driver was "one of the shining lights of the sequel trilogy". Jordan King at Empire said Ben Solo / Kylo Ren was one of the greatest Star Wars characters and many felt his death in The Rise of Skywalker was premature. He thought the plans for The Hunt for Ben Solo sounded amazing and expressed hope that the film could be revived. Forbes's Paul Tassi said Kylo Ren was "one of the only well-liked characters" in the sequel trilogy, and felt the combination of Driver and Soderbergh could have been successful. Responding to the idea that Disney executives did not understand how Ben Solo could be revived after The Rise of Skywalker, Tassi pointed to several examples where seemingly dead characters had been brought back to life in the franchise. This included Emperor Palpatine, whose return in The Rise of Skywalker was infamously accompanied with the line "Somehow, Palpatine returned". Several other commentators and fans also noted this and pointed out the irony of Disney's decision. Jenna Anderson of The Mary Sue said news of the film's cancellation was especially heartbreaking for fans of Ben Solo and the "Reylo" ship between him and Rey, as well as for film fans who loved the idea of Soderbergh joining the franchise. Although it was not guaranteed to be successful or resolve all of the franchise's problems, Anderson believed The Hunt for Ben Solo "had a clear and compelling artistic vision behind it... That's something I will always want to see".

The film was noted as yet another in a line of cancelled Star Wars projects under Disney, although this one differed in that it had a finalized script and was close to starting production. Writing for The Guardian, Ben Child also acknowledged the franchise's troubles under Disney but he felt it was good that executives had rejected The Hunt for Ben Solo. Child believed Kylo Ren and other characters from the sequel trilogy were "half-finished characters from a franchise that forgot what its own story was about" and were not the kind of characters that could sustain future projects. He also did not think many fans would want a film that reminded them of The Rise of Skywalker's perceived failings, and was unsure whether there was a viable explanation for how Ben Solo could come back to life. Frazier Tharpe discussed the project for GQ, saying Soderbergh's involvement was the main draw for him but still did not guarantee success, and instead recommending that Tony Gilroy be given control of the franchise following his success with the series Andor (2022–2025). Aimee Hart at Polygon thought Ben Solo's death in The Rise of Skywalker was one of that film's best scenes and said resurrecting the character would show a fundamental misunderstanding of that moment and would not be worth it, even for a new film directed by Soderbergh. Hart felt the character's sacrifice should be treated similarly to that of Kanan Jarrus in the animated series Star Wars Rebels (2014–2018), which was one franchise death that had not been undone.

The Last Jedi director Rian Johnson said he was unaware of the project before Driver's revelation but expressed support for it, saying "I will watch Driver in anything, but I would love to see him play that character again." Daisy Ridley said she heard of the project from crewmembers before the revelation and was surprised that it was Driver who publicly revealed it. Ridley praised the positivity of fan responses to the news and stated, "It's good for us to all be united about something in a really positive way. Obviously, everyone knows he was a very popular character, but it was also lovely to think, 'Wow, people really, really care and want this.'" In November 2026, Driver acknowledged the fan response to the project's revelation, including the billboards and the plane flying over Walt Disney Studios, saying it was unexpected and "pretty incredible".

== See also ==
- List of Star Wars films
- List of abandoned and unfinished films
