= The Lego Star Wars Holiday Special =

2020 animated Christmas special

- Genre: Animation; Space opera
- Based on: Star Wars by George Lucas
- Developed by: David Shayne; James Waugh; Jason Cosler; Josh Rimes; Leland Chee
- Written by: David Shayne
- Directed by: Ken Cunningham
- Starring: Helen Sadler; Omar Miller; Jake Green; Kelly Marie Tran; Matt Sloan; Billy Dee Williams; Anthony Daniels; Trevor Devall; Matthew Wood; Eric Bauza; Tom Kane
- Composer: Michael Kramer
- Country of origin: United States
- Original language: English

Production
- Executive producers: Jason Cosler; Jacqui Lopez; Keith Malone; Josh Rimes; James Waugh; Jill Wilfert
- Producers: Daniel Cavey; Dan Langlois
- Running time: 49 minutes
- Production companies: Lucasfilm Animation; The Lego Group; Atomic Cartoons

Original release
- Network: Disney+
- Release: November 17, 2020

Related
- Lego Star Wars: Terrifying Tales; Lego Star Wars: Summer Vacation

The Lego Star Wars Holiday Special (Note: Alternative simply titled LEGO Star Wars Holiday Special) is a 2020 animated Christmas special based on the Star Wars franchise, produced by Lucasfilm Animation and The Lego Group alongside Atomic Cartoons, and directed by Ken Cunningham from a script by David Shayne. It is a spoof on the 1978 Star Wars Holiday Special. Set around the in-universe holiday Life Day and after the events of Star Wars: The Rise of Skywalker (2019), it depicts Rey training Finn in the ways of the Force before time travelling across the Star Wars timeline. The special was released on Disney+ on November 17, 2020, and received generally positive reviews from critics.

== Plot ==
On the first Life Day after the defeat of the First Order, Rey trains Finn to be a Jedi, (Note: While Finn is never explicitly stated to be Force-sensitive in the films, the novelization of The Rise of Skywalker (2019) explicitly refers to the secret he's planning to tell Rey as such, while director J.J. Abrams confirmed this to be canon shortly after the film's release.) but becomes angry with herself for their lack of progress. While reading the ancient Jedi texts for help, Rey finds about a key on the planet Kordoku that she deduces could help her train Finn. With the key only being usable on Life Day, Rey and BB-8 leave for Kordoku, while the rest stay on the planet Kashyyyk, where Poe Dameron unsuccessfully tries to set-up a Life Day party for Chewbacca's family. (Note: Introduced in the Star Wars Holiday Special (1978))

On Kordoku, Rey finds the "key", which she discovers is a crystal capable of time travel to previous Life Days via a portal. (Note: Identified off-creen as the World Between Worlds, introduced in Star Wars Rebels (2014–2018)) She uses the crystal to observe former Jedi masters and students. These include Luke Skywalker training on Dagobah with Yoda, (Note: As depicted in The Empire Strikes Back (1980)) Qui-Gon Jinn and Obi-Wan Kenobi on their trade dispute mission, (Note: As depicted in The Phantom Menace (1999)) Obi-Wan and Anakin Skywalker on their way to protect Padmé Amidala, (Note: As depicted in Attack of the Clones (2002)) and Luke blowing up the first Death Star. (Note: As depicted in A New Hope (1977)) She and BB-8 accidentally overhear Darth Vader and Emperor Palpatine plotting inside the second Death Star. (Note: As depicted in Return of the Jedi (1983)) After detecting Rey and BB-8 and discovering the portal, Palpatine orders Vader to follow them. Rey and Vader end up in a duel across time that ends with them clashing on the Lars family farm shortly before Luke's departure. Rey and Vader meet young Luke and the three of them are transported back to Kordoku. Vader steals the crystal, and strands Rey and young Luke in the planet.

After handling the crystal to Palpatine, the two use it to travel into the future, ending up in Kylo Ren's chambers shortly after he named himself Supreme Leader of the First Order. (Note: As depicted in The Last Jedi (2017)) There, Ren informs them how Vader betrays and kills Palpatine. Unaware of his secret survival, (Note: As depicted in The Rise of Skywalker) the duo then travel back to the Death Star alongside Ren, with Palpatine planning to kill Vader before his betrayal and turn Ren into his new apprentice.

On Kordoku, Yoda's Force spirit shows Rey how, in her frustration, she became cold towards Finn, and that she needs to treat him as both a student and friend. With help from Yoda and Luke, Rey creates a new portal and returns to the second Death Star. Rey and the Luke from that era face against Ren and Vader, before Rey retakes the crystal and reluctantly returns Ren to his time. Luke and Rey defeat Palpatine, who is thrown into the reactor shaft by Vader, as in the original timeline, due to his mistreatment after learning of their fates.

Rey returns the young Luke to the past and restores the timeline, before returning to Kordoku in the present and returning the key. She then returns to Kashyyyk and joins the party, which Finn and Rose Tico managed to save by contacting their allies for help. Rey apologizes to Finn, and tells him she is ready to train him as her Padawan.

== Voice cast ==
- Helen Sadler as Rey
- Omar Miller as Finn
- Jake Green as Poe Dameron, Greedo, Snowtrooper
- Kelly Marie Tran as Rose Tico
- Matt Sloan as Darth Vader
- Billy Dee Williams as Lando Calrissian
- Anthony Daniels as C-3PO
- Trevor Devall as Emperor Sheev Palpatine, First Order Trooper, Mon Calamari
- Matthew Wood as Ben Solo / Kylo Ren, D-0
- Eric Bauza as Luke Skywalker, Stormtrooper
- Tom Kane as Yoda, Qui-Gon Jinn
- Grey Griffin as Maz Kanata
- Matt Lanter as Anakin Skywalker, Rodian
- Dee Bradley Baker as Clone Troopers, Max Rebo
- Ben Prendergast as Darth Maul, General Armitage Hux
- AJ LoCascio as Han Solo, Jawa
- James Arnold Taylor as Obi-Wan Kenobi

== Production ==
=== Development ===
The Lego Star Wars Holiday Special was announced to be in development in August 2020. The special serves as an homage and satire to the infamous The Star Wars Holiday Special (1978). The concept for the special was conceived by director Ken Cunningham when he was requested by The Lego Group and Lucasfilm Animation to help develop content based on the Star Wars franchise. Lucasfilm wanted to expand their Lego productions since they began to develop projects for Disney+. After a reunion between the executives where they reminisced of holiday specials they watched in their childhoods, they decided to develop a holiday special based on Lego Star Wars.

=== Writing ===
The writers drew inspiration from several Christmas specials, such as Rudolph the Red-Nosed Reindeer and Planes, Trains and Automobiles, as they felt their storytelling and lessons about family were "inherent" to the Star Wars franchise, and choose to explore Rey's burden as the last Jedi and how that isolates her from her friends. The producers ultimately conceived a time-travel plot that allows Rey to reflect "on her own mistakes, her own teachings, and what it means to be a mentor"; according to executive producer James Waugh, the concept of a time-travel story through several Star Wars projects was inspired by how children do not regulate themselves with a particular era while playing with their Lego Star Wars sets.

Though the original Holiday Special served as an inspiration for the writers, they did not want it to be a remake, instead creating an original story while "honoring" certain elements from the original special that were canonized in other Star Wars media, most prominently the Life Day. The writers gave the character of Rose Tico a prominent role in the story after her reduced role in Star Wars: The Rise of Skywalker (2019).

=== Casting ===
Voice actors from previous Star Wars media who reprise their roles in the special include Billy Dee Williams, Kelly Marie Tran, Anthony Daniels, Matt Lanter, Tom Kane, James Arnold Taylor, and Dee Bradley Baker. According to Mark Hamill, he was not approached to voice his longtime Star Wars role as Luke Skywalker in the special; the character was instead voiced by Eric Bauza. Hamill however would reprise his role as Luke in the Lego Star Wars: Rebuild the Galaxy mini-series in 2024.

=== Animation ===
Approximately 100 animators from Atomic Cartoons worked on the special. According to director Ken Cunnigham, the animators wanted the special to have as much of a cinematic quality as possible, having been inspired by the videogame Lego Star Wars: The Skywalker Saga. The animators used the LEGO Digital Designer to build models through digital Lego bricks, before being brought to Atomic Cartoons' computer software to work on the animation.

== Release ==
The Lego Star Wars Holiday Special was released on November 17, 2020, on Disney+, marking the 42nd anniversary of the original Holiday Special's release. It is also released on the Star Wars Kids YouTube channel, for a limited time in 2024.

=== Marketing ===
The special's official trailer was released on November 5, 2020. To promote the special, the producers worked closely with Lego to create tie-in sets that were released as part of the "LEGO Star Wars Advent Calendar".

== Reception ==
On the review aggregator website Rotten Tomatoes the special has an approval rating of 75%, based on 59 reviews, with an average rating of 7.4 out of 10. The site's critics consensus reads: "The Force isn't fully with this Lego Star Wars adventure, but its affectionate franchise callbacks and self-aware humor should please fans looking to spend their holidays in a galaxy far, far away". On Metacritic, the special has a weighted average score of 65 out of 100, based on 9 critics, indicating "generally favorable reviews".

Will Thorne of Variety wrote: "At the end of the (Life) day, The Lego Star Wars Holiday Special is a fun, self-contained adventure which feels a few bricks short of a full Star Wars load." The A.V. Club gave it a B− grade, comparing it to the Star Wars Holiday Special saying it "amps up that cheesiness in the best way possible, taking all the bad with the good, in a charming ode to the 1978 television special." DiscussingFilm rated it 3 out of 5 Ben Travis of Empire magazine rated it 4 out of 5. IGN rated it 7 out of 10, calling it "all at once abundantly silly, cringingly corny, and marvelously meta." IndieWire gave it an A− grade.
