= BHM =

BHM is a three-letter acronym with several meanings:

- Black History Month
- Backwoods Home Magazine, a quarterly magazine covering self-sufficiency topics
- Bambang Harymurti, an Indonesian journalist also known by his initials
- Birmingham New Street railway station in Birmingham, England
- Birmingham–Shuttlesworth International Airport (IATA code) in Birmingham, Alabama, USA
- Big Handsome Men
- Bulletin of the History of Medicine
- Jahrbuch des Bernischen Historischen Museums, see Bern Historical Museum
