= Finn (Star Wars) =

Star Wars character

- Star Wars character
- John Boyega as Finn (Note: Promotional image for The Force Awakens (2015))
- First appearance: The Force Awakens (2015)
- Created by: Lawrence Kasdan; J. J. Abrams; Michael Arndt
- Portrayed by: John Boyega
- Voiced by: John Boyega (Note: Disney Infinity 3.0, Lego Star Wars: The Force Awakens, Star Wars Forces of Destiny, Star Wars Battlefront II (2017 video game)); Arif S. Kinchen (Note: Lego Star Wars: The Resistance Rises); Omar Benson Miller (Note: The Lego Star Wars Holiday Special)

In-universe information
- Alias: FN-2187 (designation)
- Occupation: First Order stormtrooper; Resistance fighter; General in the Resistance
- Affiliation: First Order; Resistance

Finn is a fictional character in the Star Wars franchise. He first appeared in the 2015 film The Force Awakens as a First Order stormtrooper. Disturbed by the Order's cruelty during his first combat mission, he flees and joins forces with the Resistance pilot Poe Dameron and the scavenger Rey. Finn is portrayed by John Boyega in The Force Awakens, The Last Jedi (2017) and The Rise of Skywalker (2019). Boyega won the BAFTA Rising Star Award for his performance in The Force Awakens. He was also nominated for a Saturn Award for the same performance.

== Creation and casting ==
The idea for Finn's character initially came from Lawrence Kasdan, one of the screenwriters of The Force Awakens. The various writers working on the script were considering basing the leading male character on an archetype, such as a pirate or a merchant marine. Kasdan became angry, accusing the others of "not thinking big". He suggested that the character be a renegade stormtrooper, which is how Finn is depicted in the finished film.

The director of The Force Awakens, J. J. Abrams, sought unknown actors for the leading roles. He wanted audiences to have no preconceptions about a character based on an actor's previous roles. Boyega had impressed Abrams in his film debut in Attack the Block (2011), and was invited to audition for Finn. Kathleen Kennedy, the president of Lucasfilm and one of the producers of The Force Awakens, said that Boyega had been a top candidate for the role since the beginning of the casting process. After auditioning many other actors, including Tom Holland, the filmmakers offered Boyega the role.

Finn's stormtrooper designation, FN-2187, is a reference to both Princess Leia's cell number in the original 1977 Star Wars film (Note: Originally titled Star Wars, the film was later retitled Star Wars: Episode IV—A New Hope.) and to the 1963 Arthur Lipsett short film 21-87.

== Appearances ==
=== The Force Awakens ===
Finn is introduced in The Force Awakens (2015) as a First Order stormtrooper called FN-2187. During his first combat mission on the planet Jakku, he becomes disillusioned with the First Order. He frees the captured Resistance pilot Poe Dameron, and enacts a plan for both of them to escape. They steal a TIE fighter, and during their getaway Poe creates the name "Finn" for his companion, using the first two letters of his First Order designation FN-2187. Moments later, their ship is shot down and crash-lands on Jakku. Finn searches for Poe in the wreckage, but finds only his jacket before the ship is swallowed by a sinkhole. He walks into the desert, and eventually encounters the scavenger Rey and the droid BB-8. The three of them are pursued by the First Order, but manage to escape the planet in the Millennium Falcon. They soon meet Han Solo and Chewbacca, who assert they are the rightful owners of the ship. Han takes them to his friend Maz Kanata, who promises to deliver them to the Resistance. Finn decides to flee the galactic conflict, but changes his mind after the First Order destroys several planets and takes Rey prisoner.

Finn arrives at the Resistance base, where he discovers that Poe is alive. He shares information about the First Order's superweapon, Starkiller Base, and claims he can disable its protective shield. Finn, Han and Chewbacca land on the base and force Phasma—Finn's former commander—to deactivate the shield. As Resistance fighters assault the base, Finn and his companions reunite with Rey, who escaped from captivity. Han is killed by his son, Kylo Ren, who then confronts Finn and Rey in the woods. Finn battles Ren with a lightsaber, but Ren overpowers him and renders him unconscious. Rey takes up the lightsaber and wounds Ren, then escapes Starkiller Base with Chewbacca and the comatose Finn. After the base is obliterated, Rey and Chewbacca bring Finn to the Resistance headquarters for medical care.

The 2015 book Star Wars: Before the Awakening focuses on the lives of Finn, Poe and Rey prior to the events of The Force Awakens.

=== The Last Jedi ===
In The Last Jedi (2017), Finn awakens from his coma and immediately demands to know the whereabouts of Rey. Later, following a deadly First Order attack on the Resistance fleet, Finn decides to board an escape pod to keep both himself and Rey out of danger. Before he climbs aboard, he is found by the maintenance worker Rose Tico. She stuns him and intends to turn him in for desertion, but stops when Finn reveals that the First Order can track their ship through hyperspace. Finn and Rose decide to seek out and disable the tracking device, and are advised by Maz to find an expert code breaker. The duo steal a Resistance ship and journey to Canto Bight, a resort city on Cantonica. They enter a luxurious casino, and Finn is initially entranced by their lavish surroundings. He becomes disillusioned when Rose tells him that many of the people in the casino sell weapons to the First Order. Finn and Rose locate Maz's contact, but are imprisoned for a parking violation. In their cell they meet DJ, a thief and code breaker who offers to help them; they refuse, but he nonetheless liberates them.

Eventually Finn and Rose agree to accept DJ's help. They infiltrate the flagship of Supreme Leader Snoke, but are caught by Phasma. DJ betrays Finn and Rose, and they are sentenced to death. Before they are executed, the ship is thrown into chaos by a Resistance assault. Finn fights with Phasma, who falls to her demise. Finn and Rose then escape to Crait aboard a damaged shuttle. As the First Order prepares to mount an attack on Crait, Finn leads a strike to disable their powerful cannon. Suffering losses, Poe orders a retreat, but Finn flies his speeder towards the cannon, intending to sacrifice himself to destroy it. Rose slams her speeder into his, pushing him out of the blast zone. She tells him that wars are not only about fighting enemies, but also preserving what is precious. She then kisses him before falling unconscious. When Luke Skywalker arrives to distract the First Order, Finn and Poe lead the Resistance off the planet. Finn reunites with Rey and embraces her before boarding the Falcon.

In the video game Star Wars Battlefront II, Finn is a playable character through The Last Jedi downloadable content. Boyega provides Finn's voice in the game.

=== The Rise of Skywalker ===
In The Rise of Skywalker (2019), Finn and Poe discover that Emperor Palpatine has been resurrected and is marshalling the Final Order, a Sith armada of Star Destroyers built by the Sith Eternal, on the planet Exegol. Finn and his companions travel to Pasaana, where they find a clue to the location of a Sith wayfinder—a compass showing the way to Exegol. When Rey realizes that Chewbacca is a prisoner of the First Order, Finn and his friends attempt to rescue the Wookiee. Finn and Poe are captured and are set to be executed, but are rescued by the First Order's General Hux, who reveals that he is aiding the Resistance.

On Kef Bir, the companions encounter a group allied with the Resistance, led by a woman named Jannah. When Jannah reveals to Finn that she is a former stormtrooper like him, Finn suggests that the Force brought them together. Meanwhile, Rey battles with Ren and then leaves in his ship. Finn and Jannah, along with their companions, return to the Resistance base. There, they learn that Leia has died, and that she named Poe acting general. Unable to carry out the responsibility on his own, Poe appoints Finn as his co-general. Using Ren's wayfinder, Rey travels to Exegol and transmits the planet's location to the Resistance. Finn and Poe organize a strike against the Sith Eternal forces, with Finn and Jannah leading a surface attack to sabotage its navigational system. As the Resistance nears victory, Finn and Jannah are stranded on a First Order Star Destroyer, but are rescued by Lando Calrissian and Chewbacca in the Falcon. During the battle, Finn gains more faith in his intuition and connection to the Force. After returning to base, Finn reunites with Rey and Poe and celebrates the defeat of the First Order among his Resistance companions.

In The Rise of Skywalker, Finn tries to tell Rey something when they are both sinking into quicksand. Later, he refuses to tell her because Poe is listening. J.J. Abrams later confirmed that Finn wanted to tell Rey that he is Force-sensitive. The novelization of the film also mentions Finn's Force-sensitivity.

=== The Lego Star Wars Holiday Special ===
The Lego Star Wars Holiday Special is a 2020 Christmas television special in which Finn, having realized he is Force-sensitive, is now training as a Jedi under Rey. She accidentally hurts his feelings during a training session when she makes him use a wooden lightsaber. She seeks out a path to the World Between Worlds, which allows her to travel through time. Meanwhile, Finn plans to celebrate the Wookiee holiday Life Day with Poe, Jannah, Rose and Lando, as well as Chewbacca and his family. During Rey's travels, she learns from Yoda's spirit that patience and understanding are important when instructing an apprentice; she sees Finn prevent the Life Day tree from falling with his wooden lightsaber. When Rey returns home, she allows Finn to slice the Life Day roast with her lightsaber, but he cuts through the table by mistake.

=== Fortnite ===
Finn was added to Fortnite in December 2019 to promote the release of Star Wars: The Rise of Skywalker.

== Characterization ==
Boyega described Finn as a character who follows "a bigger calling" by leaving the First Order and embarking on his own journey. He said that Finn finds himself in "an extraordinary circumstance" and is "in over his head". He asserted that Finn's decisions early in the film are "based on adrenaline"; as an example, he said that Finn might suddenly snatch a weapon and then run away. In The Last Jedi, Finn was originally going to travel to Canto Bight with Poe. The film's director, Rian Johnson, realized the dialogue of the two characters was interchangeable, which resulted in what he called a "flat" storyline. He created the character Rose to challenge and contrast with Finn, and made her his companion instead.

== Reception ==
Both the character Finn and Boyega's portrayal were praised by a number of critics. Brian Truitt of USA Today lauded the dynamic between Finn and Rey, and praised the "seriously clever" dialogue between Finn and Han. Drew McWeeny of HitFix said Boyega has a "great combination of self-interested fear and reluctant heroism that he plays beautifully" and that he expertly "charts Finn's evolution as a person". Robbie Collin wrote in The Telegraph that Boyega has a "would-be-heroic schtick" that is half-brave, half-anxious, and very funny. Collin said that Finn wants to be a "daring freedom-fighter", but is uncertain about his aptitude. Peter Travers of Rolling Stone described Finn as "bracingly comic and cunning". Ty Burr of The Boston Globe offered a critical appraisal, calling Finn a "weak link" who "vacillates between noble impulses and cowardice until our interest drops away". He added, "The performance is fine but it's just fine, with little of the iconic bite a Wagnerian cartoon like this needs."

Finn's introduction was met with some racist reactions online, to which Boyega responded, "I'm not going to lose sleep over people." After the first trailer premiered, Boyega responded to critics with, "To whom it may concern ... Get used to it", and further commented that, "All the films I've done have had a secret commentary on stereotypical mentalities. It's about getting people to drop a prejudiced state of mind and realise, 'Oh shit we're just watching normal people.'" In response to those who desired to boycott the film over their disagreements with the existence of a black stormtrooper, Boyega replied, "I'm proud of my heritage, and no man can take that away from me. I wasn't raised to fear people with a difference of opinion. They are merely victims of a disease in their mind."

Some criticized The Rise of Skywalker for its treatment of characters of color, including Finn. In January 2020, an abandoned script for Episode IX was leaked, titled Star Wars: Duel of the Fates and written by Colin Trevorrow and Derek Connolly. Some media sources argued that it gave characters like Finn more to do. In the script, Finn convinces stormtroopers to defect from the First Order and leads them into battle against it. Concept art of Finn's speech while holding a flag, as well as dialogue from the unmade film, were shared on social media and compared very positively and paralleling a speech given by Boyega during the 2020 Black Lives Matter protests. In September 2020, John Boyega publicly criticized The Last Jedi for sidelining characters played by people of color. In November 2020, he revealed that this led him to have a "very honest conversation" with Lucasfilm president Kathleen Kennedy, who supported his claims.
