= Star Wars: Duel of the Fates =

Unproduced film script

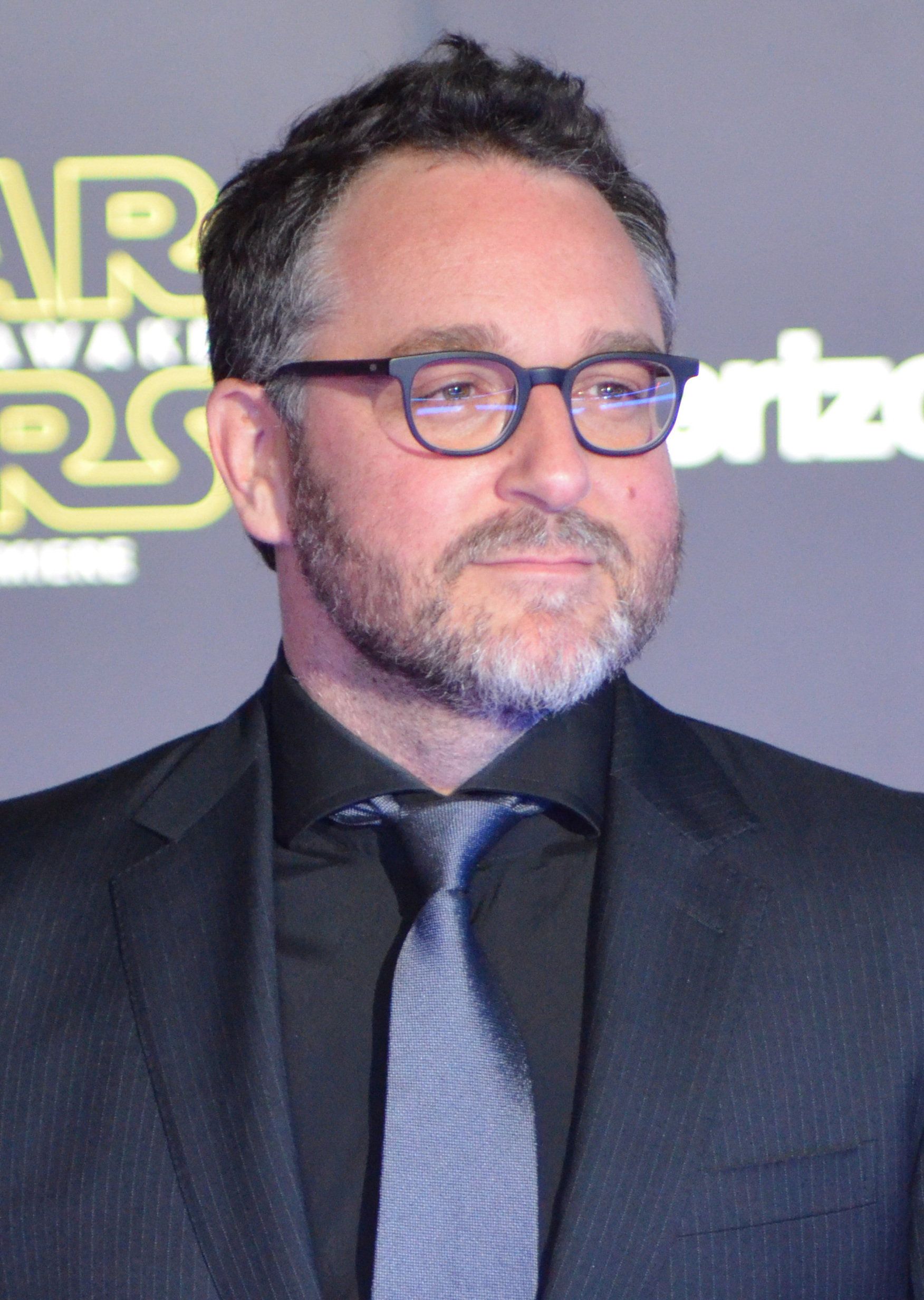
Duel of the Fates co-writer Colin Trevorrow

Star Wars: Duel of the Fates (also known as Star Wars: Episode IX – Duel of the Fates) is a 2016 screenplay written by Colin Trevorrow and Derek Connolly. It was intended as the third entry of the Star Wars sequel trilogy and the sequel to Star Wars: The Last Jedi (2017). It takes its title from a musical piece written by John Williams for Star Wars: Episode I – The Phantom Menace (1999).

Trevorrow was announced as the director of Episode IX in 2015. After producing several drafts of a screenplay, Trevorrow was removed from the project, with Lucasfilm citing the reason as "creative differences". The third in the trilogy was released in December 2019 as Star Wars: The Rise of Skywalker. While Trevorrow retained a story credit on the final release, it was directed by J. J. Abrams and co-written by Abrams with Chris Terrio. In January 2020, Trevorrow's script was posted to social media, with some critics describing the work as too professional to be fan fiction. Following the release of early concept art from the film, Trevorrow confirmed the script's authenticity.

The script was positively received. Some journalists compared the draft positively to the released film, describing it as a more faithful sequel to The Last Jedi. Series actor John Boyega expressed enthusiasm regarding the leaked concept art, but avoided reading the script to avoid "heartbreak". Several fan-made adaptations were produced.

== Composition ==
The Walt Disney Company announced in August 2015 that Colin Trevorrow would direct the third entry of the Star Wars sequel trilogy. Trevorrow's previous film, Jurassic World (2015), had been a major box-office success for Universal Studios, grossing over $1.6 billion worldwide. It was announced that Rian Johnson, who would write and direct the second entry, would write a story treatment. Johnson has disputed this, and said he intended to hand the third entry over to another director while he focused on a new Star Wars trilogy. (Note: In 2018, actress Daisy Ridley said J. J. Abrams, who directed Star Wars: The Force Awakens (2015), had written drafts for all three movies before it was decided that each director would be given creative control.)

Trevorrow wrote the script with co-writer Derek Connolly; the pair had collaborated on Safety Not Guaranteed (2012) and Jurassic World. After the release of The Force Awakens, Trevorrow said he wanted more prominent roles for Luke (Mark Hamill) and Leia (Carrie Fisher) and aimed to provide a "profoundly and deeply satisfying" answer to Rey's family. (Note: Trevorrow said: "We're going to make sure that that answer is deeply and profoundly satisfying. Rey is a character that is important in this universe, not just in the context of The Force Awakens, but in the entire galaxy. She deserves it. We'll make sure that that answer is something that feels like it was something that happened a long time ago, far away, and we're just telling you what happened.") Following The Force Awakens, there had been speculation that Rey was related to a pre-existing Star Wars character. Trevorrow planned to shoot on photographic film, describing the original Star Wars as a period movie. Playwright Jack Thorne, who wrote Harry Potter and the Cursed Child, had been hired for rewrite by August 2017.

Trevorrow's departure from Episode IX production was announced in September 2017. Lucasfilm described the departure as a mutual separation resulting from creative differences. The Independent's Jacob Stolworthy later reported Trevorrow had a "clash" with studio head Kathleen Kennedy. Some rumors indicated Trevorrow left due to the poor response to The Book of Henry (2017); the film released two months before his departure.

The third entry was released in December 2019 as Star Wars: The Rise of Skywalker, directed by J. J. Abrams and co-written by Abrams and Chris Terrio. Trevorrow retained a story credit on the released film.

=== Leak ===
Reports surfaced on social media site Reddit in January 2020 about a leaked version of Trevorrow's script, titled Star Wars: Duel of the Fates. Initial social media reports cited a YouTube livestream by filmmaker Robert Meyer Burnett outlining the plot. While Burnett did not explicitly confirm he had acquired a script, Gizmodo reported that his industry connections meant he could have obtained it. After a full script appeared on Reddit, The A.V. Club pointed to the subreddit's track record of accurate leaks about The Rise of Skywalker. Dom Nero, writing for Esquire, said that the script appeared authentic.

Later in January, captioned concept art appeared on image hosting service Imgur, showing events depicted in the script, like a star destroyer looming over Coruscant. Shortly after, Trevorrow confirmed the script's authenticity and provided clarification on the concept art—he said art featuring series character R2-D2 pictured him injured and not dead.

The script is dated 16 December 2016—eleven days before the death of Carrie Fisher. It was likely not the final draft of Trevorrow and Connolly's script. It takes its title from a piece of music, "Duel of the Fates", written by John Williams for Star Wars: Episode I – The Phantom Menace (1999).

== Plot ==
The First Order, led by General Hux as its chancellor, now controls the galaxy and has shut down all intergalactic communications. Still free from the First Order's control, Rey, Finn, Poe Dameron, Rose Tico and BB-8 steal a Star Dreadnought from the occupied planet of Kuat and take it to Korilev, where General Leia Organa leads the remaining members of the Resistance, who have set up a new base.

Kylo Ren uncovers a pre-recorded message from the dead Emperor Palpatine in Darth Vader's castle on Mustafar, prompting him to seek training from Tor Valum, a 7,000-year-old alien who once mentored Darth Plagueis. During his training, Kylo battles a phantom of Vader and gains the ability to absorb life energy. He uses this power to kill Tor Valum, strengthening himself. Meanwhile, Rey, having trained under the Force spirit of Luke Skywalker on Ahch-To, learns from ancient Jedi texts that a device capable of restoring galactic communications is hidden in the old Jedi Temple on Coruscant. Finn, Rose, R2-D2, and C-3PO are dispatched to Coruscant to retrieve it, while Rey, Chewbacca, and Poe travel to the planet Bonadan in order to locate the planet Mortis, as Rey has seen a vision of herself dueling Kylo there. Leia convinces Lando Calrissian and his smugglers to join the Resistance for an attack on Coruscant.

On Coruscant, Finn and Rose find and activate a device that could help Leia spark a galaxy-wide rebellion, but their presence is soon discovered by First Order troops. Rose is captured, but Finn escapes after battling a stormtrooper named RK-514, whom he defeats and spares. RK-514 defects, and together they convince other stormtroopers to join their cause. Meanwhile, on Bonadan, Rey, Poe, and Chewbacca locate Mortis, but they are ambushed by Kylo's Knights of Ren.

After defeating them, Rey, in a moment of anger, uses Force lightning to kill one of the Knights upon recalling that they were responsible for her parents' deaths. Fearing her descent into darkness, Rey decides to go to Mortis alone, leaving Poe and Chewbacca to return to the Resistance base.

Back on Coruscant, Finn leads a revolution against the First Order, aided by droids, citizens, and rebelling stormtroopers. Leia, Poe, Chewbacca, Lando, and a Resistance army arrive to join the fight. With the First Order's defeat, Hux takes his own life. After escaping captivity, Rose reconfigures the hyperdrive of the First Order's flagship, sending it crashing into Coruscant as it attempts to flee.

Kylo and Rey arrive on Mortis, where Kylo experiences a vision of his father, Han Solo, while Rey sees a vision of her parents — whom Kylo reveals he killed. The two clash in a fierce battle, during which Kylo blinds Rey before approaching a monastery rumored to house an ancient power. There, he is confronted by the spirit of Luke Skywalker. Despite Luke’s warnings, Kylo presses forward, while Luke offers guidance to Rey, who faces Kylo once again. Rey declares that her former masters were wrong to reject the dark side and embraces both light and dark, using this newfound balance to defeat Kylo.

Kylo attempts to kill Rey by draining her life energy, but Leia reaches him through the Force and persuades him to stop. Kylo transfers his own life energy to Rey, healing her but sacrificing himself. Before dying, his last words reveal Rey’s surname is Solana. Nearing death, Rey is visited by the spirits of Luke, Yoda, and Obi-Wan Kenobi, who offer her a choice to die and rest.

Back at the Resistance base, Finn, Poe, Rose, and Chewbacca are honored with medals. Finn and Rose settle on Modesta, where they raise Force-sensitive children. Rey visits their home, promising to teach the children about the Force and the importance of maintaining the balance between light and dark to ensure lasting peace across the galaxy.

== Response ==
Many reviews described the script positively, noting the generally disappointed reception of The Rise of Skywalker. The Hollywood Reporter's Brian Davids said the script had received an "overwhelmingly positive response". TechRadar's Samuel Roberts said the script was better than the produced film. A YouTube channel, Mr Sunday Movies, produced an animated recap of the script. Digital Spy's Joe Anderton compared the animation style to that of The Legend of Zelda: Link's Awakening (2019).

Kara Hedash writes that the film preserves other narrative beats from The Last Jedi, describing it as a "more cohesive sequel", including a larger part for Rose Tico, who became a background character in The Rise of Skywalker. Leah Flavell concurs, describing the film as a "sequel [to the movie] rather than a redo". Hedash and several other journalists said Trevorrow's script does not retcon the parentage of series heroine Rey. The BBC's Ian Youngs observes that The Last Jedi did not fulfil fan theories about her lineage. Her surname is given by the script as Solana.

Concerning trilogy villain Kylo Ren, Polygon's Austen Goslin noted his death in both films, but didn't consider him to be redeemed in Duel of the Fates despite his dying act of repentance. Several Force ghosts attempt to redeem Kylo Ren, and he is haunted by the ghost of Luke Skywalker following his death in The Last Jedi.

Several reviewers highlighted the reduced presence of Emperor Palpatine in the script compared to the released film. Palpatine remains dead in Duel of the Fates and appears briefly as a hologram intended for Darth Vader in the event of Palpatine's death.

=== Cast and crew ===
John Boyega called concept art featuring Finn "dope"

Several actors from the franchise mentioned their characters' narrative in the script compared to the finished release. Following the release of The Rise of Skywalker, John Boyega publicly criticised the movie for sidelining characters of color, particularly his character Finn and Kelly Marie Tran's character Rose Tico, stating that the studio had given "all the nuance" to the white leads. The Duel of the Fates script depicted Finn and Rose leading a stormtrooper rebellion; Boyega described the concept art as "dope" and expressed interest in a television series depicting it, but would not read the final script because he'd "be heartbroken". Chris Agar drew parallels between the concept art of Finn wielding a flag on the frontlines of battle with Boyega's participation in Black Lives Matter protests.

Colin Trevorrow considered Duel of the Fates a "practice run" in finishing a franchise he grew up watching. This statement related to his then-upcoming film Jurassic World Dominion (2022). Trevorrow said some crew members attached to Duel of the Fates, like production designer Kevin Jenkins, worked on Jurassic World Dominion with him. In an interview with The Hollywood Reporter's Brian Davids, Trevorrow expressed difficulty "engaging" with Star Wars "on an emotional level" since departing from the project; he said the television series Andor had "brought [him] back in".
