= Reality Show (film) =

- Directed by: Colin Trevorrow
- Written by: Daniel Klein; Colin Trevorrow
- Produced by: Peter J. Clark; Daniel Klein; Colin Trevorrow
- Starring: Dan Sherbondy; Greg Garcia; Joe Gnoffo; Justin Lee; Austin Meredith; Chris Anderko
- Narrated by: Dean Welsh
- Cinematography: Matthew C. Boyd
- Edited by: Matt Thiesen
- Music by: Brandon Krueger
- Production company: The Gravity Collaborative
- Release dates: November 21, 2004 (New York International Independent Film and Video Festival)
- Running time: 55 minutes 72 minutes
- Country: United States
- Language: English

Reality Show is a 2004 documentary film directed by Colin Trevorrow. It was written by Daniel Klein and Trevorrow, who also acted as producers along with Peter J. Clark. The film documents the attempted production of an unaired pilot for a reality television show titled Rock the Party.

== Synopsis ==
To achieve instant fame, eccentric millionaire Dan Sherbondy funds his own reality show. His Craigslist advertisements invite 10 women to compete for the title of "America's Craziest Party Girl". Sherbondy, his best friend, 10 women, a little person, and an inexperienced production crew travel to Baja, Mexico, but the millionaire's appalling treatment of the cast and crew causes them to rise up against him. The film is narrated by Dean Welsh.

== Production ==
The project began production in 2003, as a self-produced pilot for a reality television show titled Rock the Party. The pilot was funded by entrepreneur Dan Sherbondy, who also hosted a late-night television show in Las Vegas, Nevada.

According to director Colin Trevorrow, "It's footage of a real thing that happened, which is this guy, who is kind of a lunatic, and really just the world's biggest asshole, took a crew off of Craigslist, and a bunch of women, and told them they were on a reality show. He took 'em down to Mexico, hired a bunch of guys for nothing to shoot it, and he was really just...I don't know what he was doing; he was really down there to sleep with all these women, essentially. And I was hired to direct that. It was my first thing, you know: "I'll pay you $500!" "Great! I'll do it!" And it turned into this absolute disaster."

Filming locations included a hotel in the Mexican city of Rosarito Beach. Trevorrow said, "The shoot at the hotel was the seediest, worst experience of our lives…we made the worst reality show in history." Sherbondy ultimately gave Trevorrow all the footage. The crew then filmed each other giving interviews about the troubled production. Trevorrow cut the interviews and footage together to form the documentary. Trevorrow said "I have interviews with the crew, where they discuss this preposterous bullshit that went on. It's a strange doc about how people use this reality show medium to take advantage of people."

== Release ==
Sherbondy allowed the film to be released after securing an executive producer credit and any future profits. The film was first shown at the New York International Independent Film and Video Festival on November 21, 2004. In 2006, the film was shown at San Francisco's DocFest and the Milwaukee Film Festival.

In 2012, Trevorrow said the film was no longer available: "The guy it's about -- the movie is basically a documentary about how awful he is -- he actually lost a job or something over it, so he made us take it down everywhere and you can't find it anymore."
