= Colin Trevorrow =

American filmmaker (born 1976)

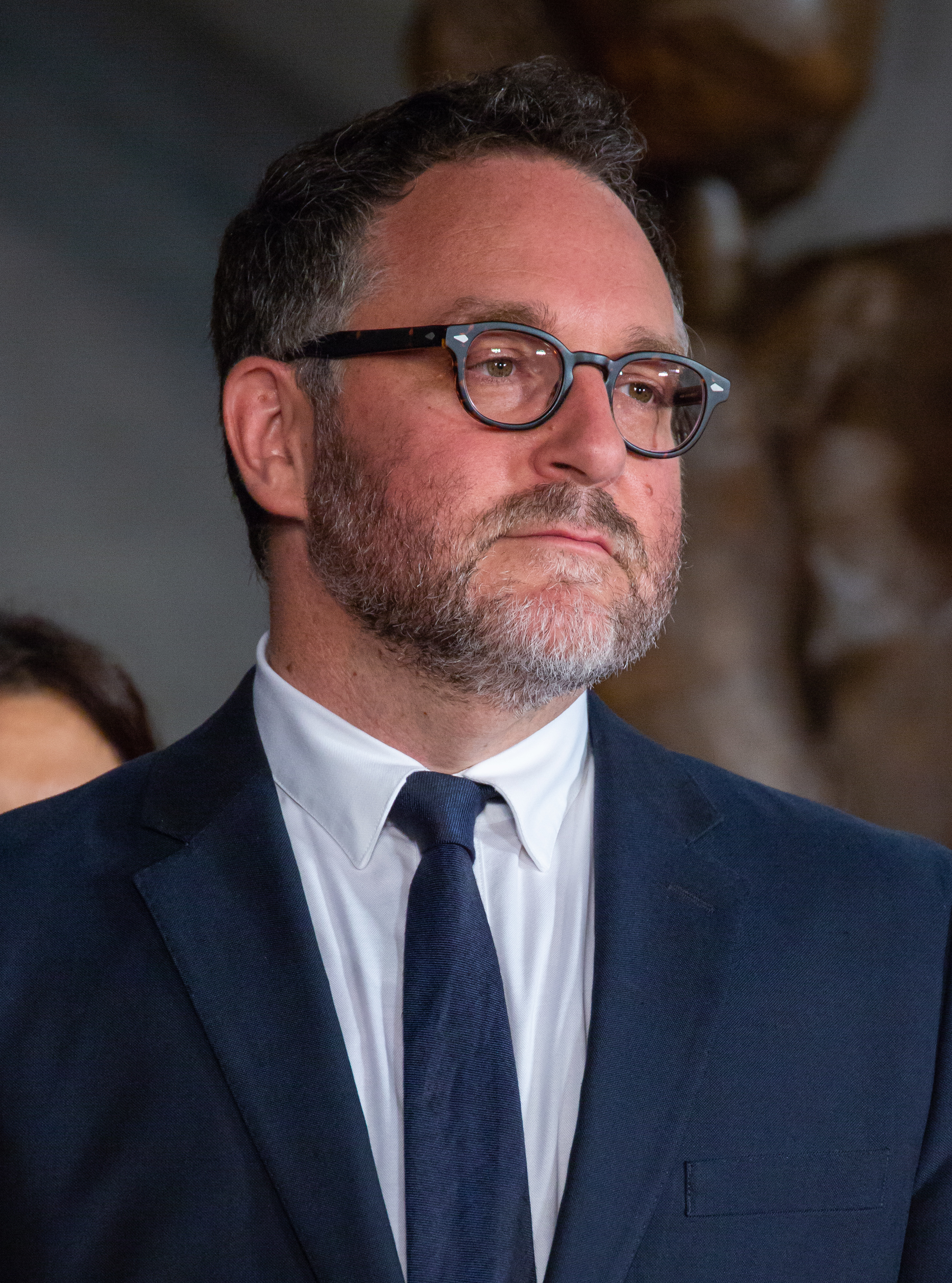
- Trevorrow at the 2018 Japan premiere of Jurassic World: Fallen Kingdom
- Born: September 13, 1976 (age 49); San Francisco, California, U.S.
- Education: New York University (BFA)
- Occupations: Director; Producer; Screenwriter; Founder of Metronome Film Co.
- Years active: 2002–present
- Spouse: Isabelle Trevorrow
- Children: 2
- Website: metronomefilm.com

Colin Trevorrow (US: /trəˈvɑːroʊ/; born September 13, 1976) is an American filmmaker. He made his feature directorial debut with the science fiction comedy Safety Not Guaranteed (2012) to critical and commercial success. Trevorrow achieved mainstream recognition for the Jurassic World franchise, which began when he co-wrote and directed the eponymous first installment in 2015. The film earned more than $1.6 billion at the worldwide box office. After the success of Jurassic World, Trevorrow co-wrote the 2018 sequel Fallen Kingdom and co-wrote and directed the third installment Dominion (2022). He was also the co-writer and director of Star Wars: Duel of the Fates until his departure in 2017, although he retained story credit when the project was re-envisioned as The Rise of Skywalker.

In 2019, Trevorrow founded his film and TV production company, Metronome Film Co., based across London and Los Angeles.

== Early life and education ==
Trevorrow was born in San Francisco, California. He was raised in Oakland, California. His father was a musician in a country rock band and his mother was a photographer who also operated a day-care center. His maternal grandmother was of Sephardic Jewish ancestry; her ancestors settled in the Caribbean several centuries ago.

As a boy, he sang in the chorus of the San Francisco Opera. As a teenager, Trevorrow won awards from the Mill Valley Film Festival and the San Francisco Youth Film Festival. Trevorrow graduated from the public Piedmont High School in Piedmont, California. He received a Bachelor of Fine Arts with a major in film and dramatic writing from the New York University Tisch School of the Arts in 1999.

== Career ==
In 2002, he wrote and directed his first short film, Home Base; as of 2012, it had received over 20 million hits online. Trevorrow's first theatrical release was with Reality Show, a 2004 documentary film about the failed production of a reality television show. Trevorrow sold his first spec script titled Tester to DreamWorks in 2006. In 2008, he paired up with Derek Connolly, ten years after they had first met as NYU students while working as interns on Saturday Night Live, to write a buddy cop film script called Cocked and Loaded. Trevorrow said that the experience was so enjoyable that he decided to give up solo screenwriting and work with Connolly.

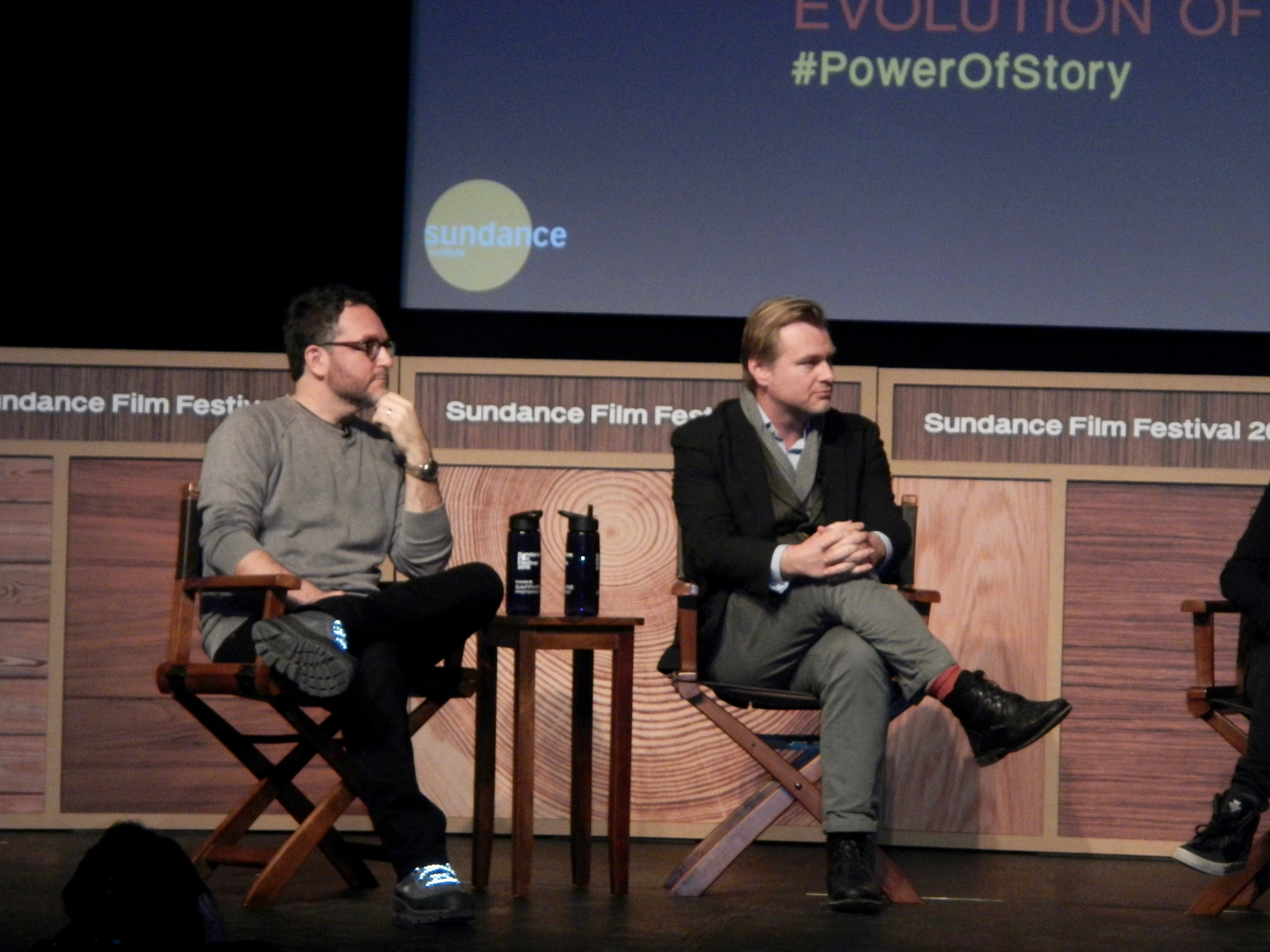
Trevorrow (left) and Christopher Nolan at the 2016 Sundance Film Festival

In 2012, Trevorrow directed Safety Not Guaranteed, a film inspired by a classified advertisement which ran in a 1997 issue of Backwoods Home Magazine that read: "Somebody to go back in time with me. This is not a joke. P.O. Box 322, Oakview, CA 93022. You'll get paid after we get back. Must bring your own weapons. Safety not guaranteed. I have only done this once before." The script was by Connolly, who intended for Trevorrow to direct it. The film received various accolades, including a nomination for Trevorrow for the Independent Spirit Award for Best First Feature. The film was nominated for the Grand Jury Prize at Sundance, where it picked up the Waldo Salt Screenwriting Award. After the release of Safety Not Guaranteed, Trevorrow and Connolly were hired by the Walt Disney Company to write an as-yet unmade remake of the film Flight of the Navigator (1986). Trevorrow co-wrote and directed Jurassic World (2015), and also provided his voice for the film's character of Mr. DNA. Connolly and Trevorrow also co-wrote the screenplay for its sequel, Jurassic World: Fallen Kingdom, which was released in June 2018 and for which Trevorrow is an executive producer.

In March 2015, it was announced that Trevorrow would be directing the sci-fi thriller film Intelligent Life, which was bought by DreamWorks. Trevorrow wrote the screenplay with Connolly, while Trevorrow, Frank Marshall, Big Beach, and Spielberg's Amblin Entertainment were announced as producing the film. While there has been other production news since, including Ava DuVernay being attached to direct, as of December 2019 the film has not entered into production.

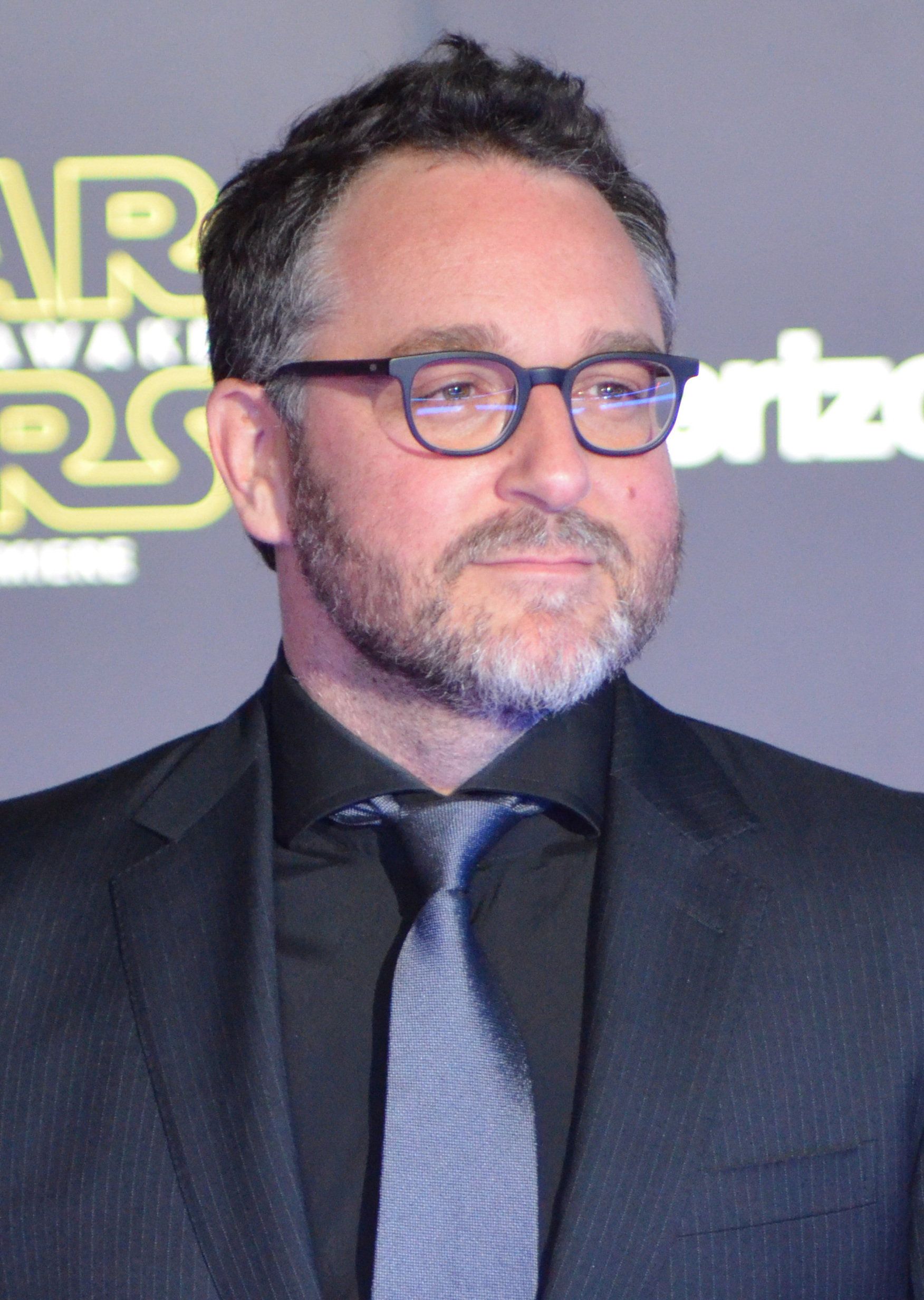
Trevorrow at the December 2015 premiere of Star Wars: The Force Awakens

In August 2015, Walt Disney Studios chairman Alan Horn announced that Trevorrow would direct Star Wars: Episode IX (2019). Trevorrow and Connolly subsequently began writing the script for the film; titled Star Wars: Duel of the Fates. However, in August 2017, writer Jack Thorne was brought in to rewrite the script due to dissatisfaction by Lucasfilm with their script. By September 2017, Trevorrow was let go from the project due to creative differences and was replaced as director by Star Wars: The Force Awakens director J. J. Abrams, who co-wrote the script with Chris Terrio. However, Trevorrow and Connolly still received story writing credit in addition to Abrams and Terrio. Trevorrow donated residuals he earned from the film to charity.

Trevorrow directed The Book of Henry, which was written by Gregg Hurwitz. The film was released by Focus Features on June 16, 2017, to generally negative reviews, although Trevorrow stood by the film.

On March 30, 2018, it was announced that Trevorrow would be returning to the Jurassic Park franchise, directing Jurassic World Dominion (2022).

On March 16, 2021, it was announced that Trevorrow would direct War Magician, a historical war film about Jasper Maskelyne, a British illusionist who used magic to defeat Nazis in World War II. Benedict Cumberbatch is set to star.

On February 5, 2023, it was revealed that Trevorrow would direct and produce a film titled Atlantis for Universal Pictures. Charmaine DeGraté is set to write the script.

On February 12, 2024, it was announced by Collider that, alongside Eddie Vaisman and Julia Lebedev, Trevorrow would produce Trash Mountain, a film about a young gay man from Chicago returning to his rural Missouri to deal with his father's hoarder state after the latter's death. Lilly Wachowski is set to direct the film, Caleb Hearon and Ruby Caster are set to write the script and Hearon will star likewise.

Trevorrow's first film produced under his Metronome Film Co. banner, Deep Cover, is set for release by Amazon MGM Studios on June 12, 2025 and will serve as the Centrepiece Headliner at the inaugural SXSW London festival.

In May 2025, it was announced that Trevorrow would direct and produce a thriller film about Area 51 for Paramount Pictures and Maximum Effort.

In October 2025, it was reported that Trevorrow was in talks to direct a live-action adaptation of The Jetsons for Warner Bros. Pictures, with Jim Carrey set to play George Jetson. Trevorrow was also reported to be in talks to write the screenplay alongside Joe Epstein.

== Personal life ==
Trevorrow lives with his wife, Isabelle, and two children in the United Kingdom.

== Filmography ==
Short film

| Year | Title | Director | Writer | Producer |
|---|---|---|---|---|
| 2002 | Home Base | Yes | Yes | Yes |
| 2019 | Battle at Big Rock | Yes | Yes | No |
| 2021 | Jurassic World Dominion prologue | Yes | Yes | No |

Feature film

| Year | Title | Director | Writer | Producer | Notes |
|---|---|---|---|---|---|
| 2004 | Reality Show | Yes | Yes | Yes | Documentary |
| 2012 | Safety Not Guaranteed | Yes | No | Yes | |
| 2015 | Jurassic World | Yes | Yes | No | Voice cameo: Mr. DNA |
| 2017 | The Book of Henry | Yes | No | No | |
| 2018 | Jurassic World: Fallen Kingdom | No | Yes | Executive | |
| 2019 | Star Wars: The Rise of Skywalker | No | Story | No | Wrote an early draft, replaced as director by J. J. Abrams |
| 2022 | Jurassic World Dominion | Yes | Yes | Executive | |
| 2024 | Taste the Revolution | No | Yes | Executive | Originally filmed in 2001 |
| 2025 | Deep Cover | No | Yes | Yes | |
| TBA | Trash Mountain | No | No | Yes | |

Television

| Year | Title | Director | Writer | Producer | Notes |
|---|---|---|---|---|---|
| 2005 | Gary: Under Crisis | Yes | Yes | Yes | TV movie Co-directed with Daniel Klein |
| 2016 | Lego Jurassic World: The Indominus Escape | No | No | Executive | Also production consultant |
| 2020–2022 | Jurassic World Camp Cretaceous | No | No | Executive | |
| 2024–2025 | Jurassic World: Chaos Theory | No | No | Executive | |

Theme parks

| Year | Title | Contribution | Notes |
|---|---|---|---|
| 2019 | Star Wars: Galaxy's Edge | TIE fighter Echelon ship design | |
