= Derek Connolly =

American screenwriter and film producer

- Born: c. 1976 (age 49–50); Miami, Florida, U.S.
- Education: Tisch School of the Arts
- Occupations: Screenwriter; film producer
- Writing career
- Years active: 2005–present

Derek Connolly (born c. 1976) is an American screenwriter and film producer. He is best known for writing well received blockbusters, including Jurassic World (2015), Kong: Skull Island (2017) and Detective Pikachu (2019). He has also written critically acclaimed genre films such as Safety Not Guaranteed (2012) and Deep Cover (2025) as well as a never produced original draft of Star Wars: Duel of the Fates, which was later released as Star Wars: The Rise of Skywalker.

== Education ==
Connolly attended Miami Palmetto Senior High School in Miami and New York University Tisch School of the Arts.

== Career ==
Connolly rewrote Kong: Skull Island (2017), for Warner Bros. Pictures and Legendary Pictures. Connolly co-wrote early (and ultimately uncredited) drafts of Pacific Rim: Uprising with Guillermo del Toro, Jon Spaihts and Zak Penn; the final screenplay was by Steven S. DeKnight, Emily Carmichael, Kira Snyder and T. S. Nowlin; based on characters by Travis Beacham and del Toro Connolly and his writing partner Colin Trevorrow co-wrote the screenplays for Jurassic World (2015) and its sequel Jurassic World: Fallen Kingdom (2018), and by February 2018, had written a story treatment for Jurassic World Dominion, was released on June 10, 2022. Connolly and Trevorrow also co-wrote the first draft of Star Wars: Duel of the Fates, the final film of Star Wars sequel trilogy, but both left after Trevorrow stepped down as director, they were later replaced by J. J. Abrams (who directed Star Wars: The Force Awakens, eventually replaced Trevorrow as director) and Chris Terrio; however Connolly and Trevorrow received a story credit with Abrams and Terrio on Star Wars: The Rise of Skywalker (2019).

Connolly was reported to be working on a remake of the film Flight of the Navigator, an original Pixar film directed by Teddy Newton, an adaptation of the Metal Gear video game series, and a live action The Legend of Zelda film.

== Writing credits ==
Year	Title	Director
2012	Safety Not Guaranteed	Colin Trevorrow
2015	Jurassic World	Colin Trevorrow
2016	Monster Trucks	Chris Wedge
2017	Kong: Skull Island	Jordan Vogt-Roberts
2018	Jurassic World: Fallen Kingdom	J. A. Bayona
2019	Pokémon Detective Pikachu	Rob Letterman
2025	Deep Cover	Tom Kingsley
2027	The Legend of Zelda	Wes Ball

=== Production ===
Year	Title	Director	Notes
2012	Safety Not Guaranteed	Colin Trevorrow	Also writer

=== Story contributions ===
Year	Title	Director	Notes
2019	Star Wars: The Rise of Skywalker	J. J. Abrams	Story only
2022	Jurassic World Dominion	Colin Trevorrow	Story only
