= Safety Not Guaranteed =

2012 film by Colin Trevorrow

- Film poster
- Directed by: Colin Trevorrow
- Written by: Derek Connolly
- Produced by: Marc Turtletaub; Peter Saraf; Stephanie Langhoff; Derek Connolly; Colin Trevorrow
- Starring: Aubrey Plaza; Mark Duplass; Jake Johnson; Karan Soni; Jenica Bergere; Kristen Bell; Jeff Garlin; Mary Lynn Rajskub
- Cinematography: Benjamin Kasulke
- Edited by: Franklin Peterson; Joe Landauer
- Music by: Ryan Miller
- Production companies: Big Beach; Duplass Brothers Productions
- Distributed by: FilmDistrict
- Release dates: January 22, 2012 (Sundance Film Festival); June 8, 2012 (United States)
- Running time: 86 minutes
- Country: United States
- Language: English
- Budget: $750,000
- Box office: $4.4 million

Safety Not Guaranteed is a 2012 American science fiction comedy film directed by Colin Trevorrow and starring Aubrey Plaza and Mark Duplass. It was inspired by a joke classified ad that ran in Backwoods Home Magazine in 1997. The film was screened at the 2012 Sundance Film Festival, where it won the Waldo Salt Screenwriting Award.

== Plot ==
Darius Britt is an intelligent but disillusioned graduate of the University of Washington who lives at home in Seattle with her widower father and works as an intern at Seattle Magazine. One of the magazine's writers, Jeff Schwensen, proposes to investigate a newspaper classified ad that reads:

WANTED: Someone to go back in time with me. This is not a joke. You'll get paid after we get back. Must bring your own weapons. Safety not guaranteed. I have only done this once before.

Jeff's boss Bridget approves of his story idea and Jeff selects his team: Darius and Arnau, a studious UW student interning at the magazine to diversify his résumé for medical school applications. They travel to the seaside community of Ocean View to find and profile the person who wrote the ad. Jeff's ulterior motive for this out-of-town assignment is to track down his long-lost love interest who lives in town.

Darius discovers the ad was placed by Kenneth Calloway, a stock clerk at a local grocery store. Jeff's attempt to approach Kenneth alienates him, so Jeff orders Darius to make contact. Darius's disaffected attitude serves her well, and she quickly endears herself to Kenneth as she poses as a candidate to accompany him on his mission. While Kenneth is seemingly acting paranoid and believes secret agents are tracking his every move, Darius gains his trust as she participates in a series of training exercises in the woods around his house. As she begins to develop feelings for him, she tells Kenneth about losing her mother when she was young and says that her mission is to prevent her mother's death. Kenneth says that his mission is to go back to 2001 and prevent the death of his former girlfriend, Belinda, who was killed when someone drove a car into her house.

Meanwhile, Jeff tracks down Liz, a fling from his teenage years. Although she is not as attractive as he had recalled, they reconnect and sleep together. He asks her to come back with him to Seattle, but she believes this is just another fling for him, so she refuses. Upset by her rejection after sincerely opening his heart, Jeff takes Arnau out on the town and they pick up some young women. Jeff tells Arnau to not waste his youth and convinces him to spend the night with one of the women.

The next morning, Jeff receives a phone call from Bridget, who has been following up the team's notes on the story. She informs Jeff that Belinda is still alive and lives an hour away from where they are. Darius insists on being the one to interview Belinda, and learns that she was only friends with Kenneth, and that Kenneth was actually the one who had driven into her then-boyfriend's house and that no one had been injured. After the interview, Darius is questioned by two government agents who have been following Kenneth and believe that he may be a spy because of his communication with government scientists. They tell her that they know Kenneth has been breaking into labs and stealing equipment.

Darius returns to Kenneth's house to confront him, but Kenneth rationalizes that the reason Belinda is now alive is that his time travel mission will succeed, and again asks her to join him. Jeff runs in to warn them that the government agents are also on the property. Kenneth panics and runs into the woods. Darius follows Kenneth, who has boarded his time machine, which has been integrated into a small boat on the lake. Darius apologizes for lying to Kenneth, tells him that everything else they shared was real, and takes his hand to join him on the boat. Kenneth tells Darius that his mission is now only to go back for her. Jeff, Arnau, and the agents watch as Kenneth and Darius activate the time machine and vanish. Kenneth and Darius are then seen running happily in the woods. A filmed interview, presumably from earlier, shows Kenneth explaining why he chose to enlist a partner for his time travels.

== Cast ==
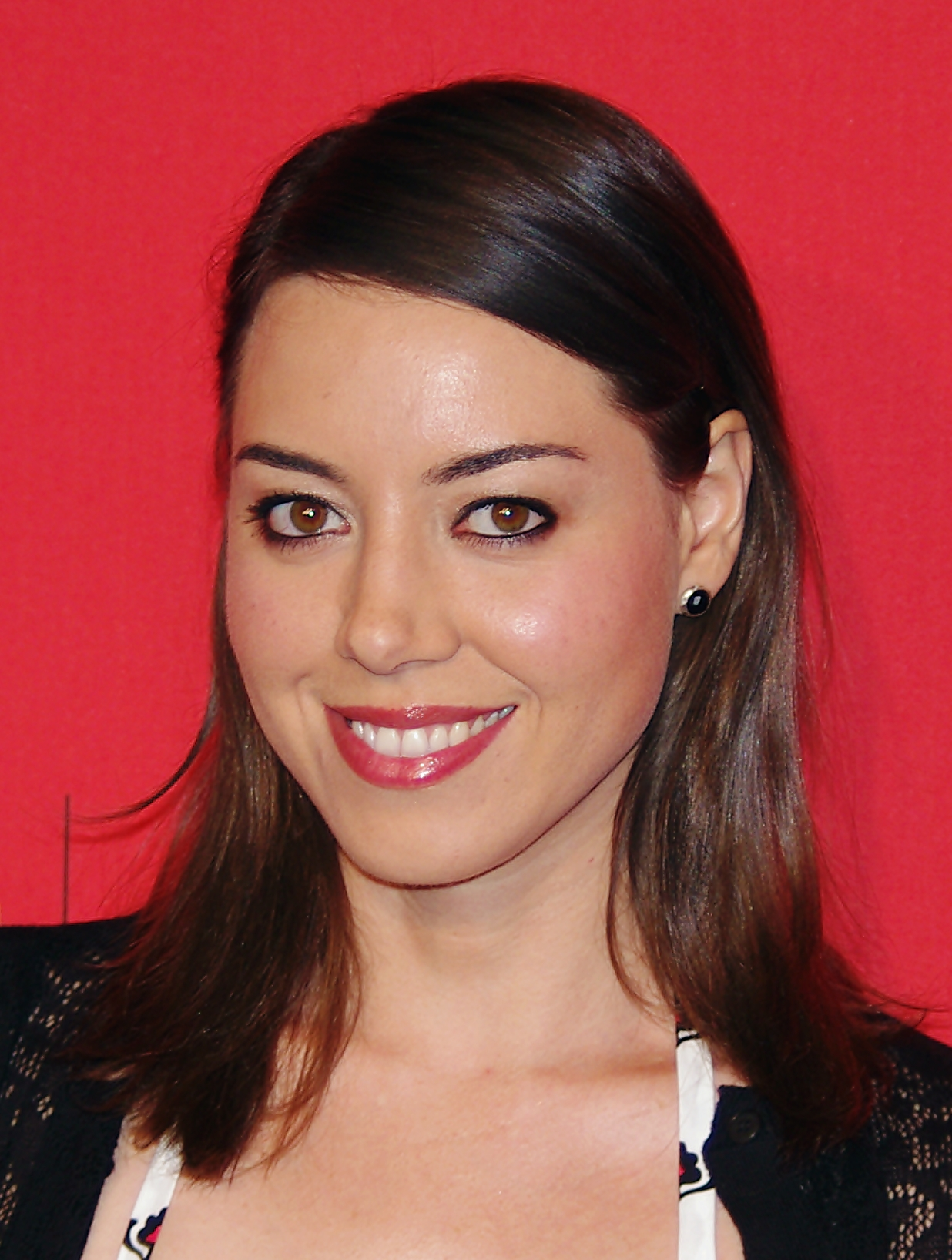
Aubrey Plaza stars as Darius Britt

- Aubrey Plaza as Darius Britt
- Mark Duplass as Kenneth Calloway
- Jake Johnson as Jeff Schwensen
- Karan Soni as Arnau
- Jenica Bergere as Liz
- Mary Lynn Rajskub as Bridget
- Kristen Bell as Belinda
- Jeff Garlin as Darius's father
- William Hall Jr. as Shannon

== Production ==
In the September/October 1997 issue of Backwoods Home, Senior Editor John Silveira wrote a joke ad as filler for the magazine's classified ad section:

Wanted: Somebody to go back in time with me. This is not a joke. P.O. Box 322 Oakview, CA 93022. You'll get paid after we get back. Must bring your own weapons. Safety not guaranteed. I have only done this once before.

This issue of the magazine also featured a fake personals ad using the same post office box, Silveira's own mailing address, which Silveira thought would give away the joke. However, the "Safety Not Guaranteed" ad became a cultural phenomenon. The address received thousands of letters in response to the time travel ad. The ad was featured on The Tonight Show with Jay Leno and discussed repeatedly on the Car Talk radio series. It was also a popular internet meme on YTMND, with one post notably featuring a voiceover by Don LaFontaine.

Connolly came across references to the ad in 2007, and initially assumed it was genuine: "There was something really sad about it all. What if he is really lamenting something from his past that he wants to go back and fix. That's what drew my attention." Connolly wrote a first draft of the script as a buddy comedy but later re-wrote the lead role with Plaza in mind, after seeing her performance in the 2009 film Funny People. Wanting to gain permission of the ad's writer to adapt the concept into a film, Connolly eventually tracked down Silveira who gave his blessing.

The film was shot in Seattle and Ocean Shores, Washington, and other locations within 30 miles of Seattle. It is also partially set in Seattle. The film was shot with a Sony F3 camera using old Panavision lenses, which gave the film a desired "Hal Ashby look" for director Colin Trevorrow. Production budget was reported by The Film Collaborative to be $750,000. Duplass and his brother Jay received executive producer credit.

== Critical reception ==
Safety Not Guaranteed has a 91% approval rating on Rotten Tomatoes based on reviews from 150 critics; the average rating is 7.40/10. The site's critical consensus states: "Safety Not Guaranteed's ostensibly modest ambitions are outmatched by the movie's strong performances, beguiling charm, and heartfelt story." Metacritic gives the film a score of 72 out of 100 based on reviews from 31 critics, indicating "generally favorable reviews".

Stephen Holden of The New York Times wrote that the story's shenanigans are "harnessed to a plaintive underlying theme about the fading dreams of those aspiring professionals in their 20s and 30s." Roger Ebert praised the film for the quality of the dialogue, characters with depth and dimension, as well as Mark Duplass for his balanced performance.

Safety Not Guaranteed has been called "one of the most influential films of the last decade" in terms of its impact on the film making industry. Made in 2012 with a first-time director and writer and costing less than a million dollars, this character-driven indie caught the eye of Netflix, foreshadowing the role of streaming in film creation and distribution, and directors of small-budget films being tapped to direct big-budget films.

== Awards ==
Award	Category	Nominees	Result
ALMA Awards	Favorite Movie Actress Comedy/Musical	Aubrey Plaza	Won
Chicago Film Critics Association Award	Most Promising Filmmaker	Colin Trevorrow	Nominated
Gotham Independent Film Awards	Best Ensemble Performance	Aubrey Plaza, Mark Duplass, Jake Johnson, Karan Soni, Jenica Bergere, Kristen Bell, Jeff Garlin, Mary Lynn Rajskub	Nominated
Independent Spirit Awards	Best First Feature	Colin Trevorrow	Nominated
Independent Spirit Awards	Best First Screenplay	Derek Connolly	Won
Leiden International Film Festival	Iron Herring: Best Feature Film	Colin Trevorrow and Derek Connolly	Won
St. Louis Gateway Film Critics Association	Best Actress	Aubrey Plaza	Nominated
St. Louis Gateway Film Critics Association	Best Arthouse or Festival Film		Won (tied with Compliance)
Sundance Film Festival	Grand Jury Prize: Dramatic	Colin Trevorrow	Nominated
Sundance Film Festival	Waldo Salt Screenwriting Award	Derek Connolly	Won
Young Hollywood Awards	Breakthrough Performance Award	Aubrey Plaza	Won

== Stage musical ==
Ryan Miller and Nick Blaemire wrote a musical adaptation of Safety Not Guaranteed, which premiered at the Brooklyn Academy of Music Harvey Theater from September 17 to October 20, 2024. Signature Theatre staged the indie musical comedy from March 3 to April 12, 2026, to positive reviews.
