= Backwoods Home Magazine =

Quarterly American magazine

- Frequency: Quarterly
- Publisher: Sam Duffy
- Founder: Dave Duffy
- Founded: 1989
- Company: Self-Reliance Publications LLC
- Country: United States
- Based in: Philomath, Oregon
- Language: English
- Website: www.backwoodshome.com
- ISSN: 1050-9712
- OCLC: 21730515

Backwoods Home Magazine is a quarterly American magazine founded in 1989, in Ventura, California, by Dave Duffy. After publication of the second issue, Duffy met Ilene Myers, who became his partner-in-publication and eventually his wife. Backwoods Home later relocated to Philomath, Oregon, and daily operations were assumed by Duffy's son, Sam.

== Content ==
Backwoods Home's articles and columns emphasize practical skills and projects for rural self-sufficient living. Frequent topics include building your own structures, growing crops, earning a living in the country, frugal living, cooking and baking, animal husbandry, identifying and harvesting wild foods, homegrown energy, emergency preparedness, self-healthcare, and firearm safety. Regular contributors include Massad Ayoob, Jackie Clay-Atkinson, Jeffrey Yago, and the Duffy family. The magazine covers are hand drawn by artist Don Childers.

== History ==
Duffy's original concept was to publish a book called Build a Backwoods Home for Under $10,000, to be based on his experience constructing an off-grid home in the Siskiyou mountains of Oregon, to which he was commuting every few months. He started the magazine as a means of advertising the proposed book after divorcing his first wife, selling his house in Oxnard, California, and finding he was unable to afford to purchase another home in Southern California. The first issue, with a print run of 6,000, published in October 1989 and was distributed free by Duffy and his daughter, Annie. A few months later, the magazine was picked up by a national distributor. The book was never completed. Duffy subsequently promoted the magazine at Eco expositions and national home shows.

Certain world events have contributed to subscription growth. During the Y2K scare, print subscriptions rose from 17,000 to 22,000. By 2001, total print circulation was approximately 50,000. In 2000, total readership was reported as 200,000, including both print and online.

The great recession led to a substantial increase in visits to its website. The print version of the magazine was briefly suspended in 2018 with the retirement of Dave Duffy, and from then was only available on Amazon Kindle until 2019 when Duffy's youngest son, Sam, took over as publisher, established Self-Reliance Publications LLC as an umbrella, and resumed print distribution.

== "Safety Not Guaranteed" classified ad ==
In the September/October 1997 issue of Backwoods Home, then Senior Editor John Silveira wrote a joke ad as filler for the magazine's classified ad section:

WANTED: Somebody to go back in time with me. This is not a joke. P.O. Box 322, Oakview, CA 93022. You'll get paid after we get back. Must bring your own weapons. Safety not guaranteed. I have only done this once before.

This issue of the magazine also featured a fake personals ad using the same post office box, Silveria's own mailing address, which Silveria thought would give away the joke.

The ad has been copied repeatedly, was featured on The Tonight Show with Jay Leno, and inspired an internet meme. The fake ad was adapted into the 2012 film Safety Not Guaranteed.
