= Letterman Army Hospital =

Former US Army facility in San Francisco, US

Coordinates: 37°47′58″N 122°26′57″W

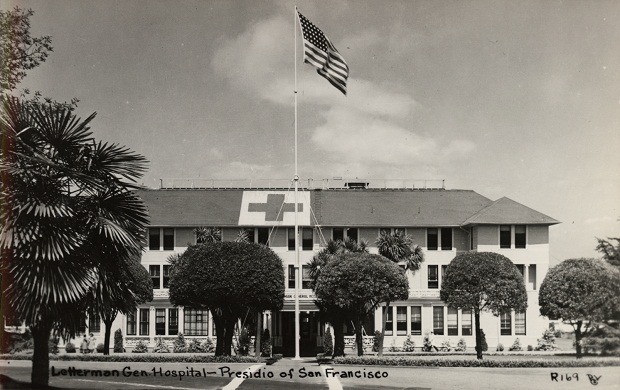
Letterman General Hospital

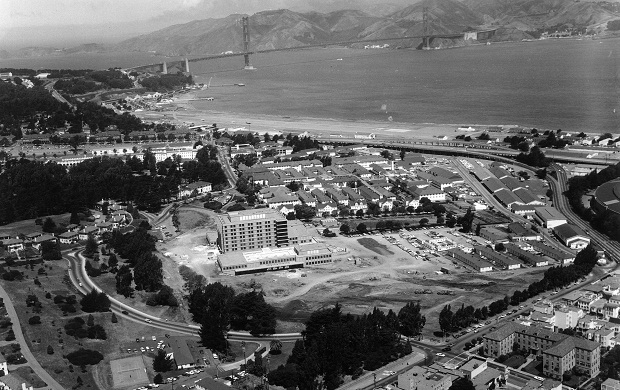
Letterman Army Medical Center in 1968 (Note the new hospital building under construction).

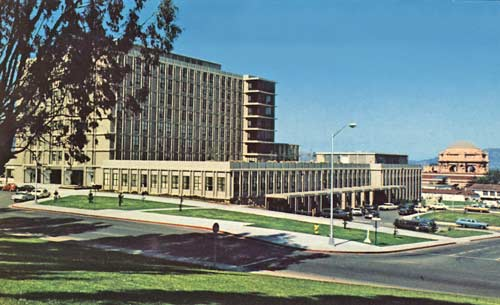
Postcard showing the new Letterman Army Medical Center (LAMC) in the 1970s.

The Letterman Army Hospital, established around 1898 and redesignated as the Letterman Army Medical Center (LAMC) in 1969, was a US Army facility at the Presidio of San Francisco in San Francisco, California, US. It was decommissioned in 1994. Some of the original 1898 buildings still exist and now house the Thoreau Center for Sustainability. The Letterman Army Medical Center built in the 1960s era was demolished to make way for Letterman Digital Arts Center.

== History ==
The hospital, built in 1898 and named in 1911 for Major Jonathan Letterman, MD (1824–1872) – known as the "Father of Battlefield Medicine" – was utilized in every US foreign conflict in the 20th century, and remained in service until the army base was decommissioned in 1995. Due to its location on the West Coast, the hospital often served as a key stateside point in support of American wars in the Pacific. In 1945, the hospital received more than 73,000 patients from the Pacific Theater of World War II. The hospital had an Italian Service Unit of 40 men to help at the hospital during the war. During the Vietnam War, the hospital received wounded American soldiers returning to the mainland.

During the period October 1992 - September 1993 the medical center was awarded the Army Superior Unit Award.

The building was decommissioned in 1994 when the base was transferred to the National Park Service and was demolished in 2002. In 2005, Lucasfilm opened the Letterman Digital Arts Center on the site of the old hospital.

== See also ==
- Public Health Service Hospital (San Francisco)
- List of former United States Army medical units
