= Star Wars sequel trilogy =

Third film trilogy in the Star Wars franchise

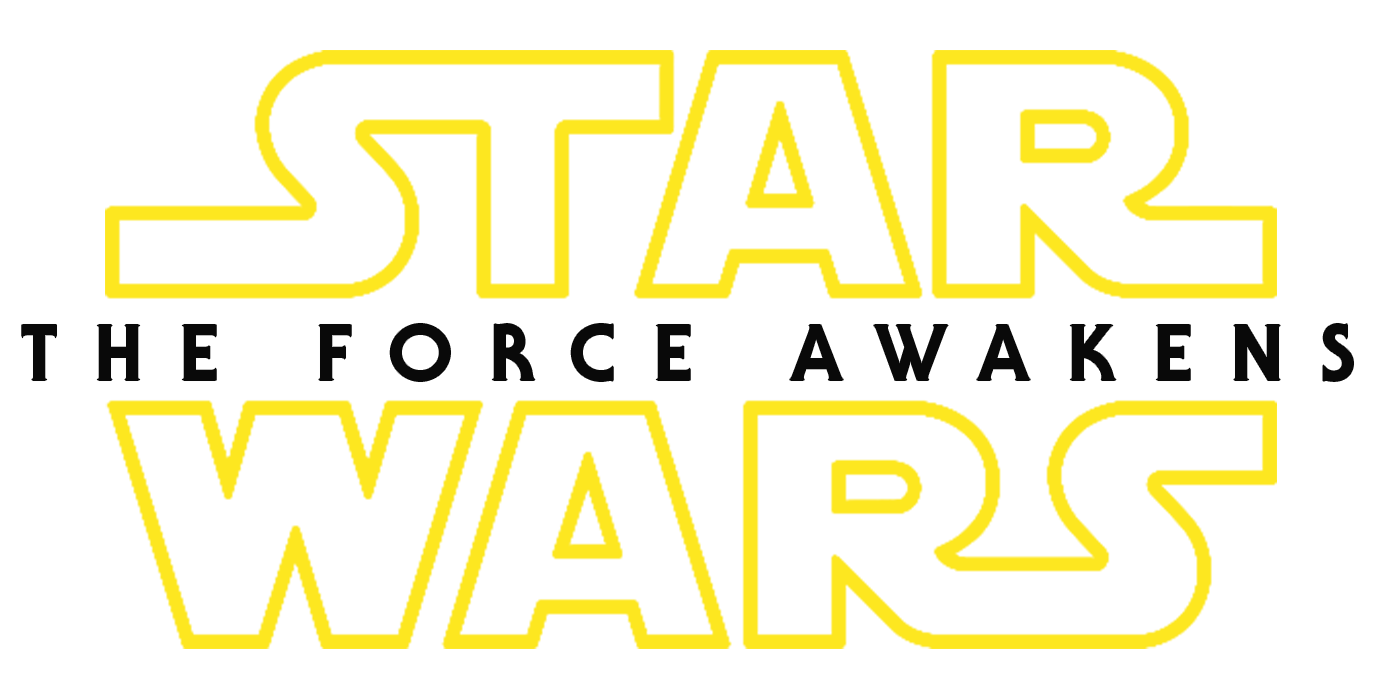
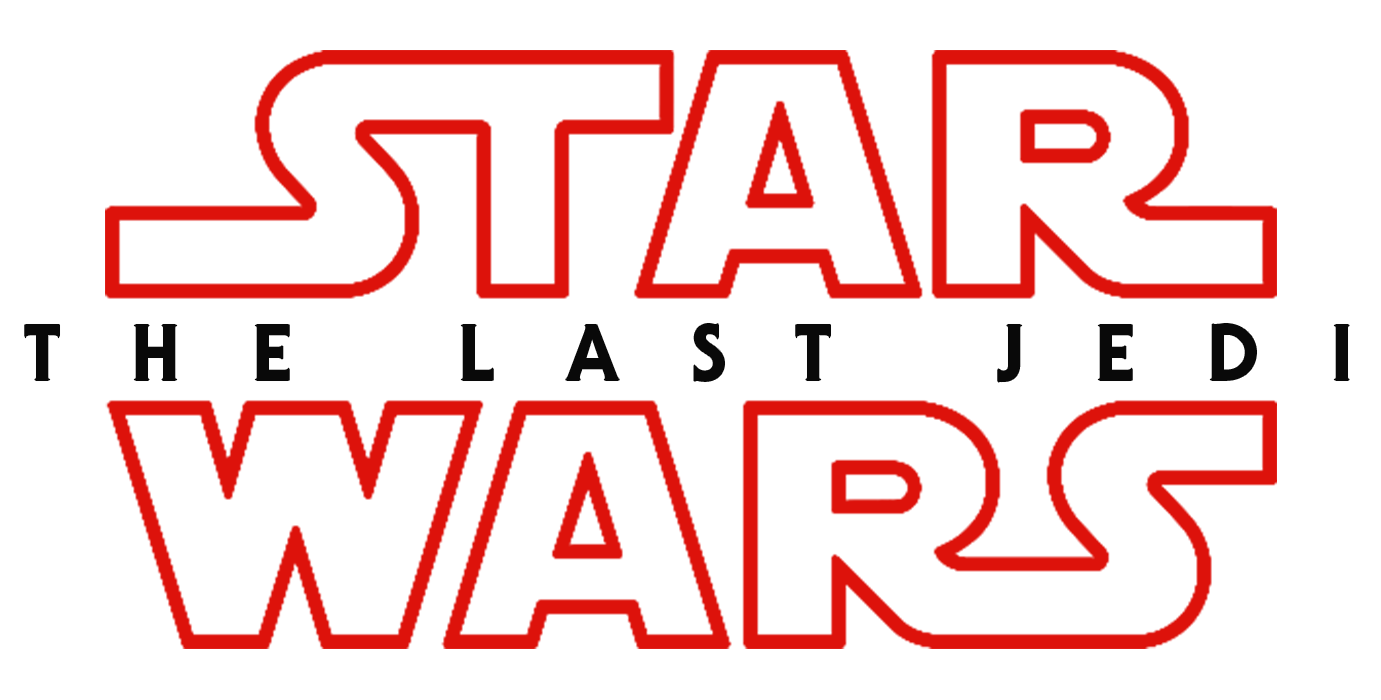
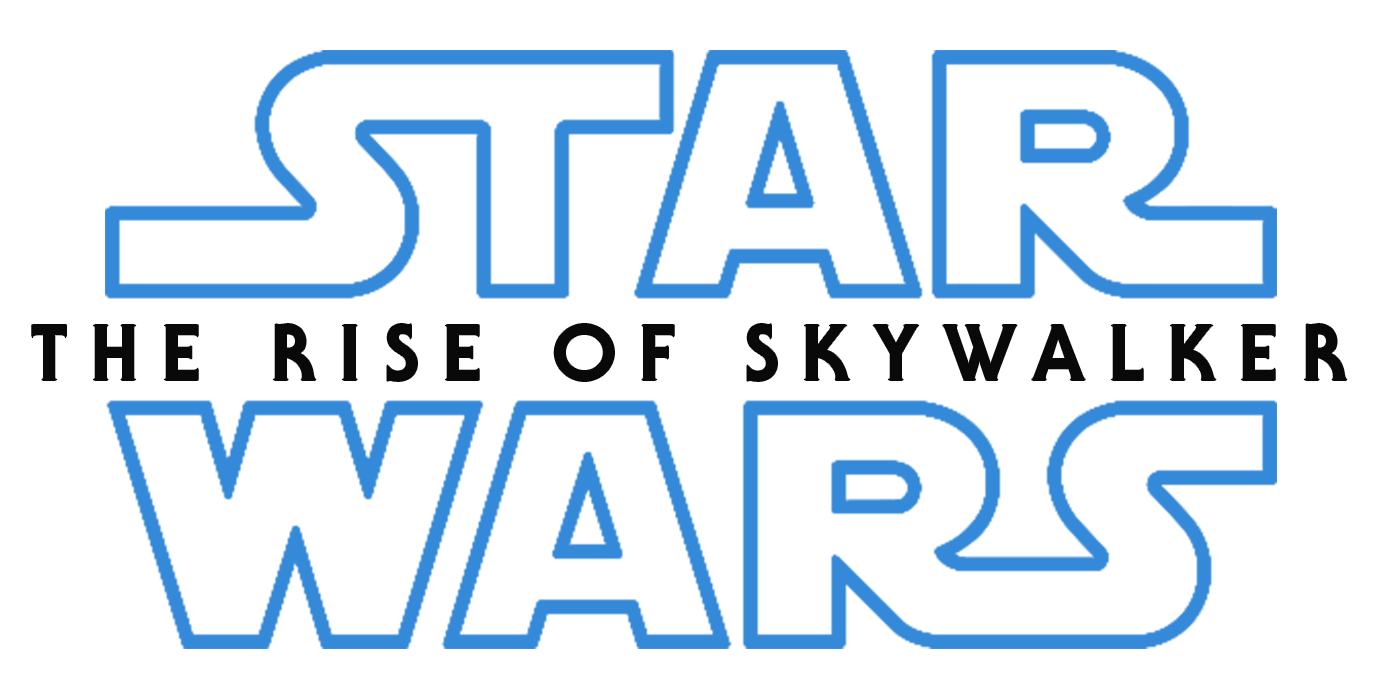
- The Star Wars sequel trilogy logos
- Directed by: J. J. Abrams (VII, IX); Rian Johnson (VIII)
- Screenplay by: Lawrence Kasdan (VII); J. J. Abrams (VII, IX); Michael Arndt (VII); Rian Johnson (VIII); Chris Terrio (IX)
- Story by: Lawrence Kasdan (VII); J. J. Abrams (VII, IX); Michael Arndt (VII); Rian Johnson (VIII); Derek Connolly (IX); Colin Trevorrow (IX); Chris Terrio (IX)
- Produced by: Kathleen Kennedy; J. J. Abrams (Note: Abrams only served as an executive producer on Episode VIII.) (VII, IX); Bryan Burk (VII); Ram Bergman (VIII); Michelle Rejwan (IX)
- Starring: Mark Hamill; Carrie Fisher; Adam Driver; Daisy Ridley; John Boyega; Oscar Isaac; Harrison Ford (VII, IX); Lupita Nyong'o; Andy Serkis; Domhnall Gleeson; Anthony Daniels; Peter Mayhew (VII); Max von Sydow (VII); Gwendoline Christie (VII–VIII); Kelly Marie Tran (VIII–IX); Laura Dern (VIII); Benicio del Toro (VIII); Frank Oz; Naomi Ackie (IX); Richard E. Grant (IX); Keri Russell (IX); Joonas Suotamo; Ian McDiarmid (IX); Billy Dee Williams (IX)
- Cinematography: Dan Mindel (VII, IX); Steve Yedlin (VIII)
- Edited by: Maryann Brandon (VII, IX); Mary Jo Markey (VII); Bob Ducsay (VIII); Stefan Grube (IX)
- Music by: John Williams
- Production companies: Lucasfilm Ltd.; Bad Robot (VII, IX)
- Distributed by: Walt Disney Studios; Motion Pictures
- Release date: 2015–2019
- Country: United States
- Language: English
- Budget: $1.369 billion
- Box office: $4.477 billion

The Star Wars sequel trilogy, released between 2015 and 2019, is the third trilogy of the main Star Wars franchise, an American space opera created by George Lucas. It is produced by Lucasfilm Ltd. and distributed by Walt Disney Studios Motion Pictures. Set within the franchise's canon universe, the trilogy consists of episodes VII through IX, chronologically following the prequel trilogy (Episodes I–III; 1999–2005) and the original trilogy (Episodes IV–VI; 1977–1983), serving as the final act of the "Skywalker Saga". Lucas had planned a sequel trilogy as early as 1976, but canceled it by 1981. He produced only the first six episodes, and for a time described these as comprising the complete story. The sequel trilogy concept was revived when the Walt Disney Company entered negotiations to acquire Lucasfilm in 2011. Lucas produced new story treatments, but these were largely discarded. Both the acquisition and plans to produce the trilogy were announced in late 2012.

The first installment, The Force Awakens, was released on December 18, 2015, after a thirty-two year hiatus between the original and sequel trilogies. It was directed by J. J. Abrams who co-wrote the screenplay with Lawrence Kasdan and Michael Arndt. Original trilogy cast members including Harrison Ford, Mark Hamill, and Carrie Fisher reprised their roles, co-starring alongside franchise newcomers Daisy Ridley, John Boyega, Adam Driver, and Oscar Isaac. The second installment, The Last Jedi, was released on December 15, 2017, with Rian Johnson as screenwriter and director, and most of the cast returning. The final installment, The Rise of Skywalker, was released on December 20, 2019. It was directed by Abrams, who co-wrote it with Chris Terrio.

The trilogy follows the orphan Rey and the plight of the Resistance against the First Order, which has risen from the fallen Galactic Empire. Rey learns the ways of the Force under Luke Skywalker and Leia Organa, and confronts Kylo Ren—the son of Leia and Han Solo, nephew of Luke Skywalker, and grandson of Anakin Skywalker / Darth Vader—who has fallen to the dark side. The first two films received positive reviews from critics, while the third received mixed reviews. The trilogy grossed over $4.4 billion at the box office worldwide, with each film surpassing $1 billion worldwide.

== Background ==
=== Early development ===
According to Mark Hamill, who plays Luke Skywalker, Star Wars creator George Lucas told him in 1976 that he planned three or four Star Wars trilogies. Lucas suggested that Hamill could have a cameo appearance role in Episode IX, which he imagined filming by 2011. A Time magazine story in March 1978, quoting Lucas, stated there would be ten Star Wars films after The Empire Strikes Back. (Note: The figure of twelve films discussed by Lucas in 1980 included "a film about robots, with no humans in it" and "a film just about Wookiees, nothing else".) Gary Kurtz, the producer of the first two films, was aware of proposed story elements for Episode VII to Episode IX before 1980. At the time of the release of The Empire Strikes Back (1980), Lucas said there were seven further Star Wars films he wanted to make. He said he had "twelve-page outlines" for those films. In an interview with Jim Steranko in Prevue magazine published in late 1980, Lucas described how the expansive scope of Star Wars had started with an overlong screenplay:

So, I took the screenplay and divided it into three stories, and rewrote the first one. ... Then, I had the other two films, which were essentially split into three parts each, two trilogies. When the smoke cleared, I said, 'This is really great. I'll do another trilogy that takes place after this.' I had three trilogies of nine films, and then another couple of odd films. ... It's a nine-part saga that has a beginning, a middle and an end. It progresses over a period of about fifty or sixty years with about twenty years between trilogies, each trilogy taking about six or seven years.

By the time of Episode V: The Empire Strikes Back's release, Lucas had written story treatments for all nine Star Wars episodes. In 1999, Kurtz revealed a brief outline of these treatments:

- Episode I would have explored the methodology of the Jedi.
- Episode II would have developed the backstory of Obi-Wan Kenobi.
- Episode III would explain the rise of Darth Vader.
- Episode IV had already seen Luke decide to become a Jedi and Obi-Wan's final confrontation with Vader.
- Episode V was filmed essentially as written.
- Episode VI was to feature Leia as an isolated monarch, Han's death, and Luke showing down with Vader before exiling himself. Luke and Leia were not related.
- Episode VII was to be the first part of a trilogy continuing the story of Luke as a Jedi.
- Episode VIII would have featured Luke's sister (distinct from Leia).
- Episode IX would introduce the Emperor and depict Luke's ultimate battle with him.

In late 1980, Lucas stated that he had "titles and ten-page story outlines for each of" the nine episodes. In an interview with the same magazine, Gary Kurtz explained that the total number of films or their content might change as they were produced. Lucas similarly stated in an interview with Starlog magazine in September 1981 that he had the nine-film series plotted, but:

... it's a long way from the plot to the script. I've just gone through that with Return of the Jedi, and what seems like a great idea when it's described in three sentences doesn't hold together when you try to make five or six scenes out of it. So plots change a lot when they start getting into script form.

As part of his biographical research on George Lucas in the early 1980s, Lucas allowed author Dale Pollock to read the plot outlines of a 12-film saga on the condition of signing a confidentiality agreement. Pollock said these sequel trilogy drafts would "involve Luke Skywalker in his 30s and 40s" and that they would be "The three most exciting stories ... They had propulsive action, really interesting new worlds, new characters." Lucas's plans were drastically changed after The Empire Strikes Back was released, owing to the stress of producing the first three films as well as pressure from his wife, Marcia, to step back from this kind of filmmaking. By 1981, Lucas had decided to make only one Star Wars trilogy.

=== Cancellation period ===
According to Gary Kurtz, details of elements from the discarded sequel trilogy which were incorporated into Return of the Jedi include:

- Luke Skywalker becomes a full-fledged Jedi knight.
- Luke's sister, who was originally meant to be a new character, was revealed to be Leia.
- The Emperor would first appear and Luke would confront him.

Through the 1980s, Lucas variously hinted at plot elements from his abandoned sequel trilogy, which he said would have revolved around moral and philosophical problems, including distinguishing right from wrong, justice, confrontation, and passing on what one has learned. Ideas which seem to have been used in Disney's sequel trilogy include:

- Episode VII would begin 20–40 years after the end of Return of the Jedi (Lucas in 1980 and 1982).
- R2-D2 and C-3PO would be the only characters to appear in all nine films (Lucas in 1980, 1981, and 1983).
- The key actors, Hamill as Luke Skywalker, Ford as Han Solo, and Fisher as Princess Leia, would appear in their 60s or 70s (Lucas in 1983).
- Lucas stated in 1980 that "what happens to Luke ... is much more ethereal. I have a tiny notebook full of notes on that." Hamill said in 1983 that if his character were to return again, it would be "on another plane of existence, or not the same character." (Note: According to Mark Hamill, George Lucas told him in 1976 that Luke Skywalker would make a cameo appearance in Episode IX, in which he would "be like Obi-Wan handing the lightsaber down to the next new hope.")

Ideas that were apparently not retained in Disney's sequel trilogy include:

- The trilogy would deal with the rebuilding of the Republic (Lucas in 1980).
- Luke might have had a romantic relationship with a female partner (Lucas in 1988).

Timothy Zahn, who wrote the Legends non-canonical Thrawn trilogy of novels, was interviewed about the sequel trilogy after its development by Disney was announced in 2012. He confirmed that it was never meant to be based on his Thrawn trilogy nor the rest of the Expanded Universe, and said that he had been briefed years before on Lucas's plans for the sequels:

The original idea as I understood it—and Lucas changes his mind off and on, so it may not be what he's thinking right now—but it was going to be three generations. You'd have the original trilogy, then go back to Luke's father and find out what happened to him, and if there was another seventh, eighth, or ninth film, it would be Luke's children.

In 1992, Lucas announced his intentions to produce a prequel trilogy. When asked, he would frequently repeat that he had no plans to make the sequel trilogy and that he would not allow other directors to make it. At a press conference for the 1997 Special Edition of the original trilogy, Lucas stated, "I don't have scripts [for the sequel trilogy]. The only notion on that was, wouldn't it be fun to get all the actors to come back when they're 60 or 70 years old and make three more about them as old people." Also in 1997, he said: "[The whole story has] six episodes.... If I ever went beyond that, it would be something that was made up. I really don't have any notion other than, 'Gee, it would be interesting to do Luke Skywalker later on.' It wouldn't be a part of the main story, it would just be a sequel to this thing." He further stated, "When you see it in six parts, you'll understand. It really ends at part six."

On the possibility of someone else making Star Wars films, Lucas said, "Probably not, it's my thing." In August 1999, at a press conference to discuss The Phantom Menace, Lucas described the "nine-year commitment" required to make a Star Wars trilogy. In 2002, he said: "Basically what I said as a joke was, 'Maybe when Harrison and Carrie are in their 70s, we'll come back and do another version.' The thing I didn't realize then, and that I do realize now very clearly, is that not only would they be in their 70s, but I would be in my 70s too." He reiterated, "Ultimately, the saga will be six films, a 12-hour story. Then people can watch all six films together as they were intended to be seen."

In 2007, Lucas described making the films at that age as "an idea that seemed amusing at the time, but doesn't seem realistic now", and suggested that "off-the-cuff" comments he had made in earlier years had been misconstrued as absolute statements. In 2008, after all six films had been released, Lucas said: "The movies were the story of Anakin Skywalker and Luke Skywalker, and when Luke saves the galaxy and redeems his father, that's where that story ends." In another 2008 interview, Lucas ruled out anybody else making Star Wars films, and added that the Expanded Universe did not line up with his vision. Asked if he wanted new Star Wars films to be made after his death, he said: "I've left pretty explicit instructions for there not to be any more features. There will definitely be no Episodes VII–IX. That's because there isn't any story. ... The Star Wars story is really the tragedy of Darth Vader. That is the story."

=== Sale of Lucasfilm to the Walt Disney Company and renewed development ===
In May 2011, Lucas was in Orlando, Florida, to celebrate the opening of Star Tours – The Adventures Continue at Walt Disney World. He was invited to breakfast by Disney CEO Bob Iger, who asked Lucas if he would be willing to sell his company to Disney. Lucas, who had begun to consider retiring, was not ready to do so at that time. Lucas considered directing Episode VII for a May 2015 release and then selling his company. But by then, despite his plans for three more Star Wars films, he had decided that he wanted to make the Lucas Museum of Narrative Art (which eventually opened on September 22, 2026) and he knew that he was running out of time. So he decided to leave the franchise in the hands of other filmmakers, announcing in January 2012 that he would step away from making blockbuster films.

In early 2012, after being disappointed by the weak performance of Red Tails, Lucas announced to The New York Times that he was planning to retire. While he was in New York, he asked Kathleen Kennedy to lunch. He asked if she would be a co-chair at Lucasfilm with him, with the intention of transferring leadership entirely to her after about a year. She began working for him on June 1, 2012; Lucas soon proposed that they work together on the sequel trilogy. They brought in Michael Arndt to write a draft of Episode VII based on Lucas's synopsis. Star Wars screenwriting veteran Lawrence Kasdan was hired to support Arndt. (Note: Kasdan would also support Lucas in developing a Han Solo prequel, finished under the leadership of Kathleen Kennedy.) After making an appearance at Star Wars Celebration VI in late August, Lucas took Mark Hamill and Carrie Fisher to lunch and asked if they would be willing to reprise their roles for the new films. They agreed, as did Harrison Ford after being promised that Han Solo would be given meaningful closure.

Details of his sequel trilogy treatments included the conclusion of the Skywalker family's story, with its third generation being portrayed in their twenties. Lucas hoped to explain concepts he had imagined when he originally drafted his saga in the 1970s. Most specifically he revealed the "symbiotic relationships" between the Jedi, the Force, midi-chlorians (microscopic lifeforms, first mentioned onscreen in 1999's The Phantom Menace), and the Whills (all-powerful creatures first mentioned in the title of the original outline of Star Wars, Journal of the Whills):

[The next three Star Wars films] were going to get into a microbiotic world. But there's this world of creatures that operate differently than we do. I call them the Whills. And the Whills are the ones who actually control the universe. They feed off the Force. Back in the day, I used to say ultimately what this means is we were just cars, vehicles, for the Whills to travel around in. We're vessels for them. And the conduit is the midi-chlorians. The midi-chlorians are the ones that communicate with the Whills. The Whills, in a general sense, they are the Force. ... But it's about symbiotic relationships. I think, personally, one of the core values we should have in the world, and kids should be taught, is ecology, to understand that we all are connected. (Lucas, 2018)

By June 2012, Lucas had agreed to sell his company, provided that Kennedy would replace him as president of Lucasfilm. Iger agreed, while insisting that Disney would have final say over future movies. Lucas's final stipulations before the sale in late 2012 were that his story treatments would be used and that the number of Disney employees who could read them would be limited. Lucas gave Kennedy the final draft of his story treatments during the October 2012 sale. The same month, the Disney sale and production of the sequel trilogy, as well as a 2015 release date for a new film, were announced to the public. Lucas stated, "I always said I wasn't going to do any more, and that's true, because I'm not going to do any more. But that doesn't mean I'm unwilling to turn it over to Kathy to do more". Both plot outlines, the one written in the 1980s and the one written in the early 2010s, were given to Iger around the time that Disney acquired Lucasfilm.

In January 2013, Lucas held the first story briefing about the as-yet untitled Episode VII at Skywalker Ranch. Related concepts stemming from these early briefings include the following story elements:

- A 14-year-old female Jedi Padawan named Taryn. Lucas also considered Thea and Winkie as potential names for the character. The female Padawan was retained as the 19-year-old Rey. (Note: This character was described by screenwriter Michael Arndt as a "loner, hothead, gear-headed, badass." J. J. Abrams initially gave her the placeholder name of 'Sally' during pre-production, but as development on the film continued, her name was changed to Kira (which was retained as a production code for the character), then Echo, and finally Rey. The phonetically similar name Qi'ra would be used for the girlfriend of a young Han Solo in the anthology film Solo: A Star Wars Story.)
- Another teenager named Skylar who befriends the protagonist and carries a blaster. He ultimately became the stormtrooper character, Finn. In at least one conception, Skylar was the son of Han Solo and Leia Organa, and ultimately fell to the dark side of the Force (these plot developments were retained for the backstory of Ben Solo/Kylo Ren in the final iteration). However, in some drafts, this character was not anyone's son, and in others it was not decided whose son he was. (Note: Michael Arndt described the character as "pure charisma." J. J. Abrams initially gave him the placeholder name of 'Harry' during pre-production, but as development on the film continued, his name was changed to Sam and then, ultimately, to Finn.)
- The older Luke Skywalker (Note: Luke was going to be a "Colonel Kurtz type, hiding from the world in a cave". Luke was going to be in a self-imposed exile, haunted by the betrayal of one of his students, and spiritually in "a dark place".) would have exiled himself to a remote planet where the first Jedi temple was located. (Note: The first Jedi temple concept art was bell-shaped, and designed by VFX art director James Clyne. This would be reworked as the temple on Ahch-To.) Luke would have started off reluctant to train the female Padawan, but eventually have a change of heart and agree to train her. Lucas planned for Luke to die in Episode VIII. Conversely, in 2018, Hamill said that Lucas' original vision for the ending of Episode IX was to have Luke die then instead of making a simple cameo, leaving his sister Leia as a Jedi. Luke was going to appear with dialogue in the first film. (Note: After Lucas's departure, Michael Arndt had the idea to make Luke's first appearance a speechless cameo at the end of the first film.)
- One of the antagonists would be a character named Darth Talon (later revealed to be the female Sith Lord from the Star Wars: Legacy comic book series), who served a powerful master (codenamed "Uber" by the production team) and was responsible (in some versions of the story) for turning the son of Han and Leia to the dark side of the Force. Talon's role in the story was eventually subsumed into the role of Kylo Ren, and "Uber" became Supreme Leader Snoke.
- Darth Vader's castle, which Lucas had been developing since the preproduction phase of The Empire Strikes Back, would have been involved.

In an interview published in 2020, Lucas says he decided not to work on the trilogy because he was "about to have a daughter" at the time and decided to "enjoy life for a while." He also detailed more of his story treatments:

- The trilogy would start a few years after the events of Return of the Jedi. According to Lucas, "we establish pretty quickly that there's this underworld, there are these offshoot stormtroopers who started their own planets, and that Luke is trying to restart the Jedi."
- Darth Maul would return with robotic legs (as had been established in Star Wars: The Clone Wars) and train the female Darth Talon as his apprentice. According to Lucas, "She was the new Darth Vader and most of the action was with her. So these were the two main villains of the trilogy." Maul would become "the godfather of crime in the universe because, as the Empire falls, he takes over."
- Leia is trying to rebuild the Republic and "get it under control from the gangsters." Lucas stated that "That was the main story."
- Luke "puts the word out, so out of 100,000 Jedi, maybe 50 or 100 are left. The Jedi have to grow again from scratch, so Luke has to find two- and three-year-olds, and train them. It'll be 20 years before you have a new generation of Jedi. By the end of the trilogy, Luke would have rebuilt much of the Jedi, and we would have the renewal of the New Republic, with Leia, Senator Organa, becoming the Supreme Chancellor in charge of everything. So she ended up being the Chosen One."

In April 2014, it was announced that "In order to give maximum creative freedom to the filmmakers and also preserve an element of surprise and discovery for the audience, Star Wars Episodes VII-IX will not tell the same story told in the post-Return of the Jedi Expanded Universe." The announcement stated that the only existing Star Wars material that would be considered part of the new canon, would be Episodes I–VI along with The Clone Wars animated film and series.

In 2015, Lucas revealed (to his disappointment) that his outlines had been discarded in order to "make something for the fans". Episode VII writer and director J. J. Abrams later revealed that the same year, Disney had given him a mandate to discard Lucas's story and "start from scratch". (Note: Disney was faced with the challenge of pleasing devoted Star Wars fans more so than with the company's other franchises.) Episode VII: The Force Awakens was written by Lucasfilm veteran Lawrence Kasdan, along with J.J. Abrams and Michael Arndt. Bob Iger's memoirs, published in 2019, recount that Lucas was upset after hearing the plot of The Force Awakens in meetings, specifically about elements that were derivative of the original 1977 film. (Note: While J. J. Abrams had directed the critically acclaimed 2009 Star Trek reboot, its sequel Star Trek Into Darkness (the most recent film Abrams had directed before The Force Awakens) was similarly criticized as being a loose remake of an earlier film, Star Trek II: The Wrath of Khan.) Lucas felt betrayed by Iger and Abrams because they discarded some of his sequel trilogy ideas.

Episode VIII: The Last Jedi writer and director Rian Johnson's initial response to the script of The Force Awakens included the suggestion of minor adjustments to the ending. According to Abrams, these improved the movie and made it line up more with The Last Jedi. Abrams intended for BB-8 to help Rey search for Luke, which Johnson changed to R2-D2 (due to his being Luke's droid, as well as BB-8 belonging to Poe and not knowing Luke). Additionally, Abrams' ending featured Rey finding Luke lifting rocks with the Force, which was changed due to Johnson's plot of Luke having disconnected himself from the Force. Johnson implied that his portrayal of the Force in The Last Jedi was influenced by the "Mortis trilogy" of episodes from The Clone Wars, which he had rewatched early in the writing process on the advice of The Clone Wars supervising director Dave Filoni. He also stated that he considered including Lando Calrissian in the film, possibly giving him the role of new character DJ (Benicio del Toro), but did not because it would have meant Lando betraying the characters without redemption. Abrams credited The Last Jedi with influencing him to be more daring on The Rise of Skywalker.

Some reports indicate that, contrary to popular belief, some plot points across the trilogy were planned in advance. The idea of Luke Skywalker living on an island following his failure to stop the murder of his Jedi apprentices and then training an apprentice who would help him overcome his self-doubt was first pitched by George Lucas in 2013 during creative meetings between himself and Lucasfilm as part of story discussions for Episode VII (these ideas would later be used in The Last Jedi). Several plot points of The Rise of Skywalker were pitched in an early 2014 story meeting between Lucasfilm executives (including Dave Filoni, Pablo Hidalgo, Doug Chiang, John Knoll and Kiri Hart) after the plot of The Force Awakens had been finalized, including the notion of Leia as a mentor figure to Rey, Leia breaking through to her son Ben Solo (Kylo Ren) and the notion of Rey as "the Skywalker" of the trilogy by metaphor rather than blood connection. The return of Emperor Palpatine in Episode IX was planned as far back as the earliest development phase of the trilogy. Similarly, Abrams hinted that Palpatine being Rey's grandfather was an early idea he and Lawrence Kasdan had while working on The Force Awakens, although Daisy Ridley later claimed that ideas for Rey's lineage changed throughout filming of The Rise of Skywalker. Adam Driver claimed that back when shooting The Force Awakens, Kylo Ren was not meant to be redeemed by the end of the trilogy, which was the character arc Abrams had in mind at that moment, with Ren starting insecure about his commitment to the dark side before becoming the one most committed by the end of the trilogy in reversal to his grandfather Darth Vader's arc in the original trilogy, noting that Johnson took that planned direction in consideration when shooting The Last Jedi even though he took other decisions.

== Films ==
Unlike the previous two trilogies, whose films were released approximately three years apart ahead of Memorial Day weekend, the sequel films were released two years apart from each other in December. Star Wars: The Force Awakens was released on December 18, 2015, and introduces the 19-year-old orphan, Rey, who is drawn into the conflict between the Resistance and the First Order, a ruthless military faction commanded by Kylo Ren—the son of Leia Organa and Han Solo. In The Last Jedi, released on December 15, 2017, Rey is trained by Luke Skywalker, the last living Jedi, while again facing Ren and the First Order. The Rise of Skywalker was released on December 20, 2019, and features the conclusion of the age-old conflict between the Jedi and Sith, with Rey confronting the resurrected Emperor Palpatine.

Film	U.S. release date	Director(s)	Screenwriter(s)	Story by	Producer(s)	Distributor
Star Wars: The Force Awakens (Note: Also known as Star Wars: Episode VII – The Force Awakens or simply The Force Awakens)	December 18, 2015	J. J. Abrams	Lawrence Kasdan, J. J. Abrams and Michael Arndt	Lawrence Kasdan, J. J. Abrams and Michael Arndt	Kathleen Kennedy, J. J. Abrams and Bryan Burk	Walt Disney Studios Motion Pictures
Star Wars: The Last Jedi (Note: Also known as Star Wars: Episode VIII – The Last Jedi or simply The Last Jedi)	December 15, 2017	Rian Johnson	Rian Johnson	Rian Johnson	Kathleen Kennedy and Ram Bergman	Walt Disney Studios Motion Pictures
Star Wars: The Rise of Skywalker (Note: Also known as Star Wars: Episode IX – The Rise of Skywalker or simply The Rise of Skywalker)	December 20, 2019	J. J. Abrams	J. J. Abrams & Chris Terrio	Derek Connolly, Colin Trevorrow, J.J. Abrams and Chris Terrio	Kathleen Kennedy, J. J. Abrams and Michelle Rejwan	Walt Disney Studios Motion Pictures

=== Star Wars: The Force Awakens ===
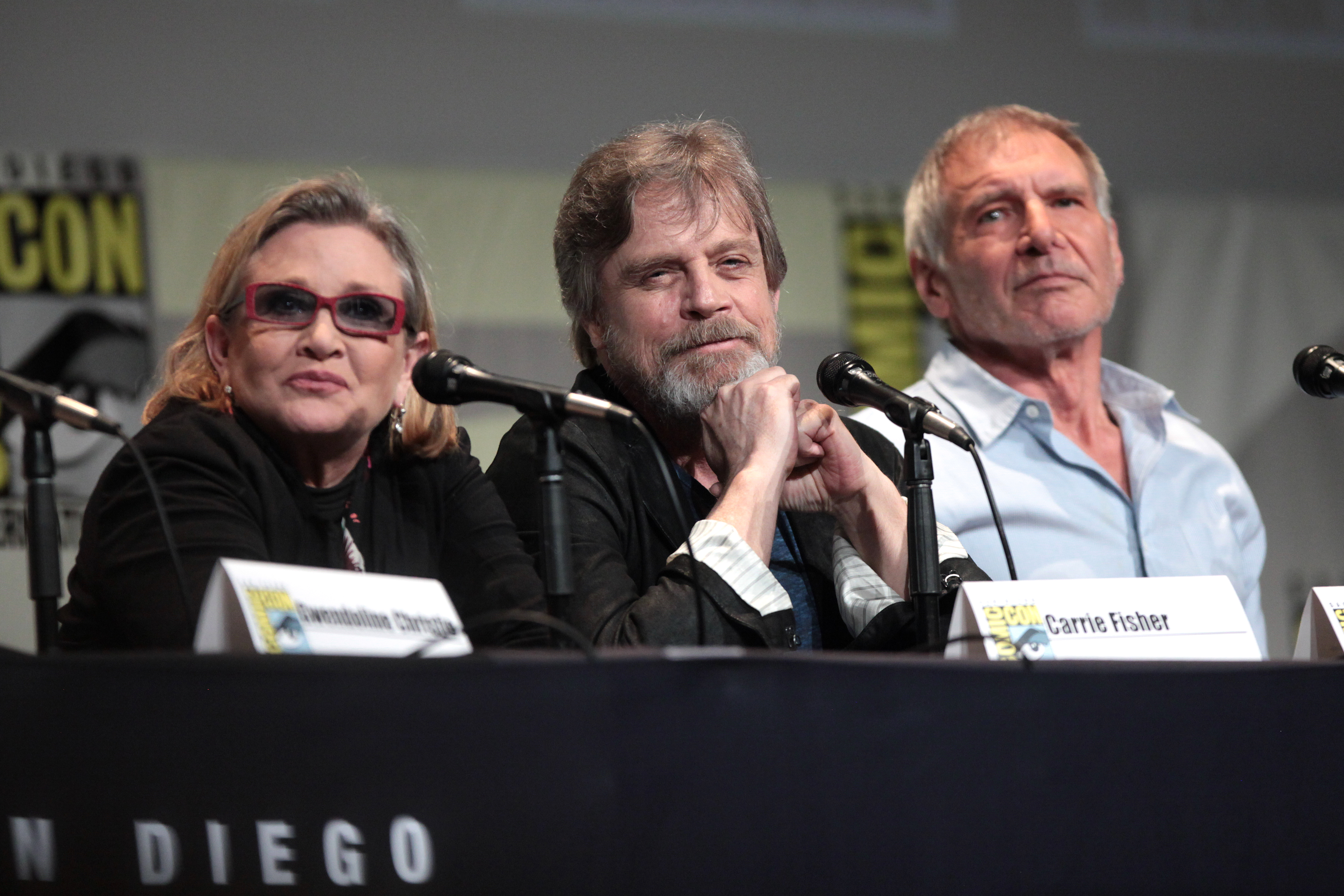
Fisher, Hamill, and Ford reprised their characters in supporting roles.

About 30 years after the destruction of the second Death Star, Luke Skywalker has vanished. The remnants of the Empire have become the First Order, which seeks to destroy Luke and the New Republic. The First Order is opposed by the Resistance, led by General Leia Organa. On the planet Jakku, Resistance pilot Poe Dameron obtains a map to Luke's location, but he is captured by First Order enforcer Kylo Ren—the son of Leia and Han Solo. Poe's droid BB-8 escapes with the map and encounters a scavenger named Rey. Rey and BB-8 team up with a defecting stormtrooper, Finn, along with Han Solo and Chewbacca, to deliver the map to the Resistance.

Episode VII began development on October 30, 2012. The screenplay for the film was originally set to be written by Michael Arndt, but time management and creative differences contributed to his departure from the project. (Note: Concept art possibly based on Arndt's draft shows Kira (Rey) searching for the underwater remnants of the second Death Star. This idea may have been repurposed for The Rise of Skywalker, as it depicts Rey in the remnants of the second Death Star, which rest in a watery environment.) On January 25, 2013, J. J. Abrams was officially announced as Episode VII's director and producer, along with producer Bryan Burk and Bad Robot. John Williams was hired to compose the music for the entire sequel trilogy. In October, it was announced that writing duties would be taken over by Abrams and Lawrence Kasdan, co-writer of The Empire Strikes Back and Return of the Jedi.

George Lucas was set to provide Abrams with advice as a creative consultant; however, Lucas had no involvement, with his representative stating that he "ideally would love not to see any footage until he walks into the theater next December. He has never been able to be surprised by a Star Wars film before and he said he was looking forward to it." Production began in April 2014; it was released on December 18, 2015. In the US, the film received a PG-13 rating "for sci-fi action violence" and the equivalent M rating in Australia, the second Star Wars film to receive that classification after Episode III – Revenge of the Sith.

The film broke opening weekend box office records in North America with $248 million ($39 million more than previous record holder Jurassic World) and totals of $529 million worldwide, the largest opening ever. The film set another new record by becoming the first movie to break the $1 billion mark in box office sales in just 12 days. It is currently the highest-grossing film of all time in North America and the fourth highest-grossing film worldwide, unadjusted for inflation.

=== Star Wars: The Last Jedi ===
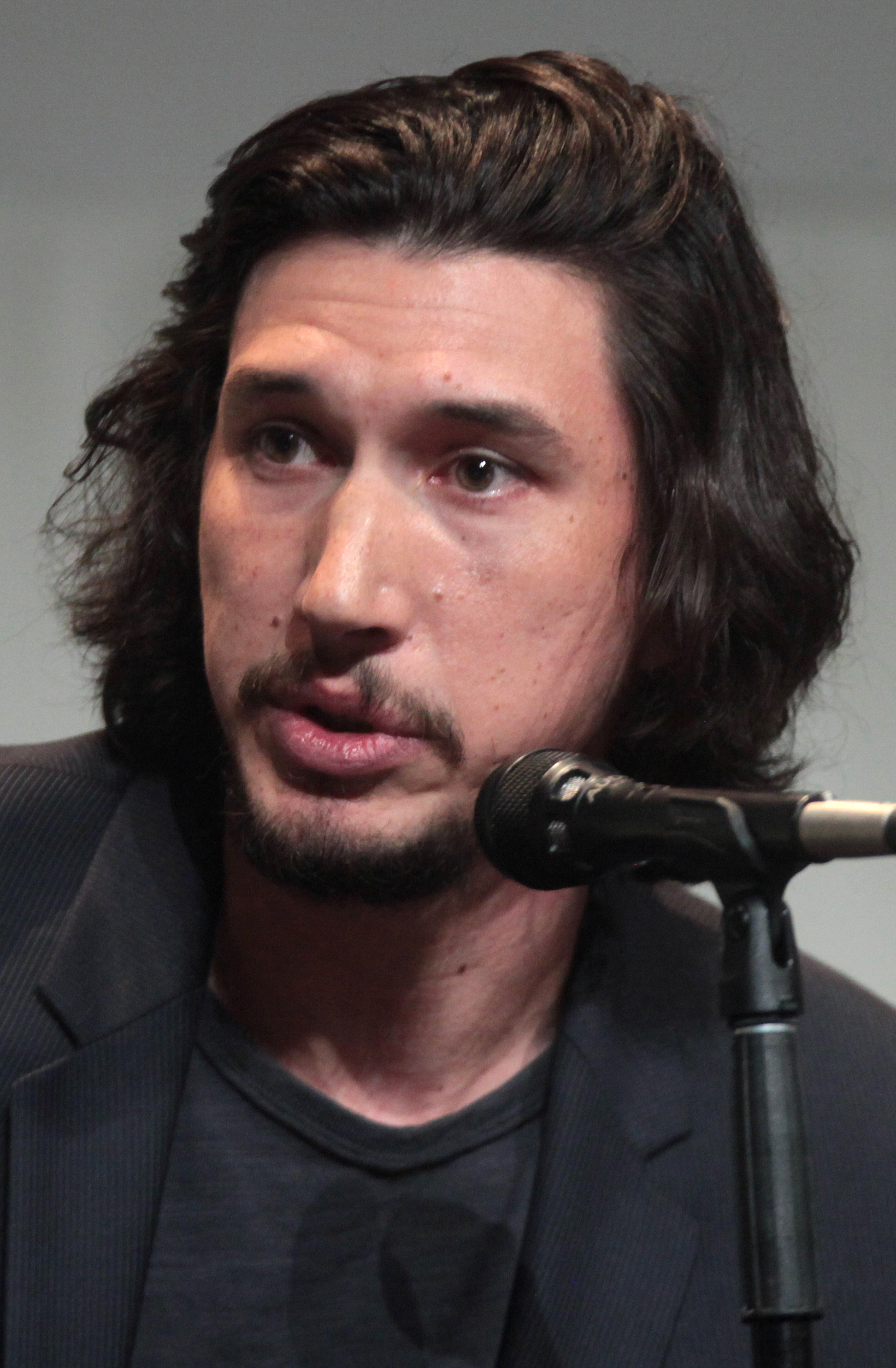
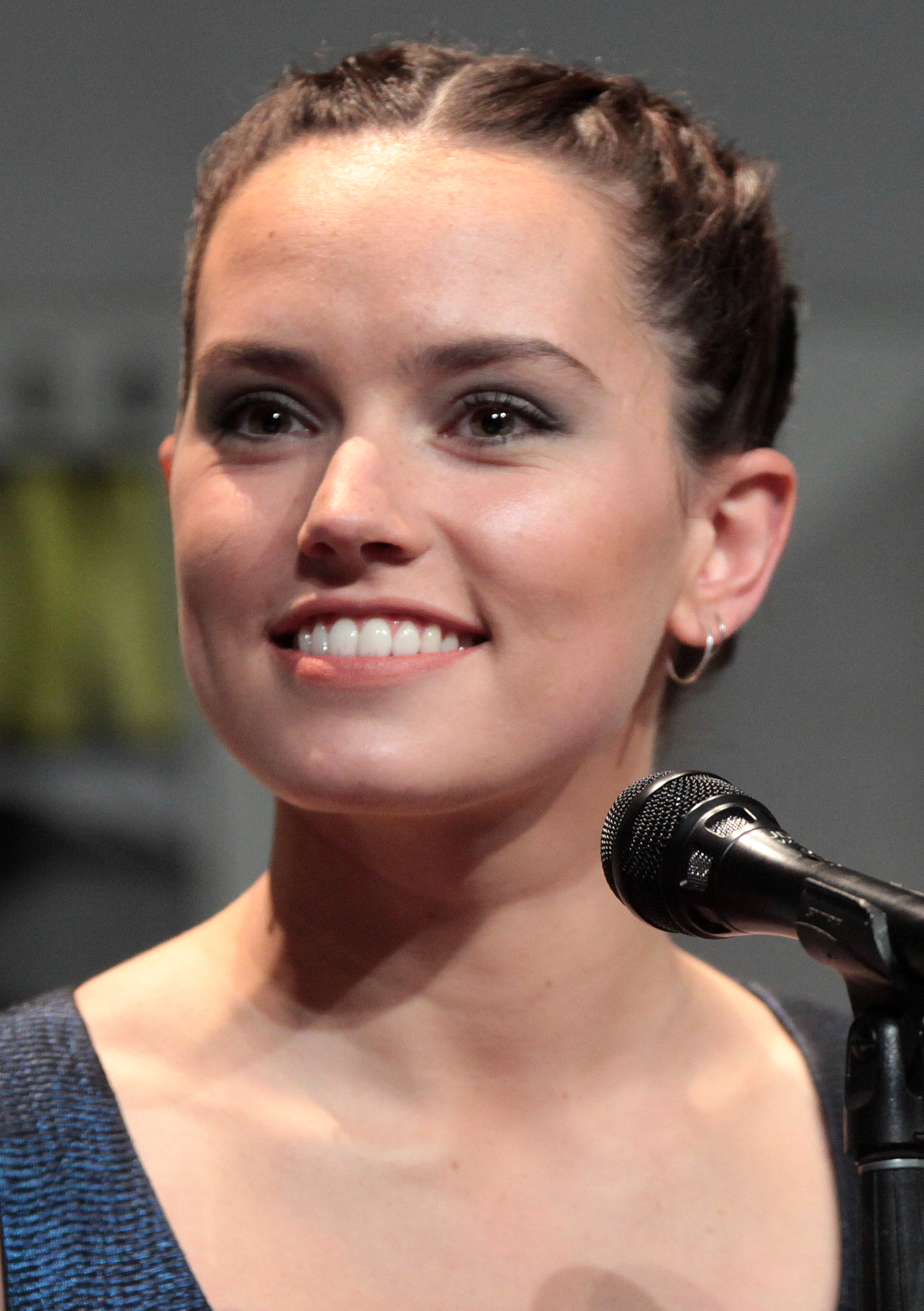
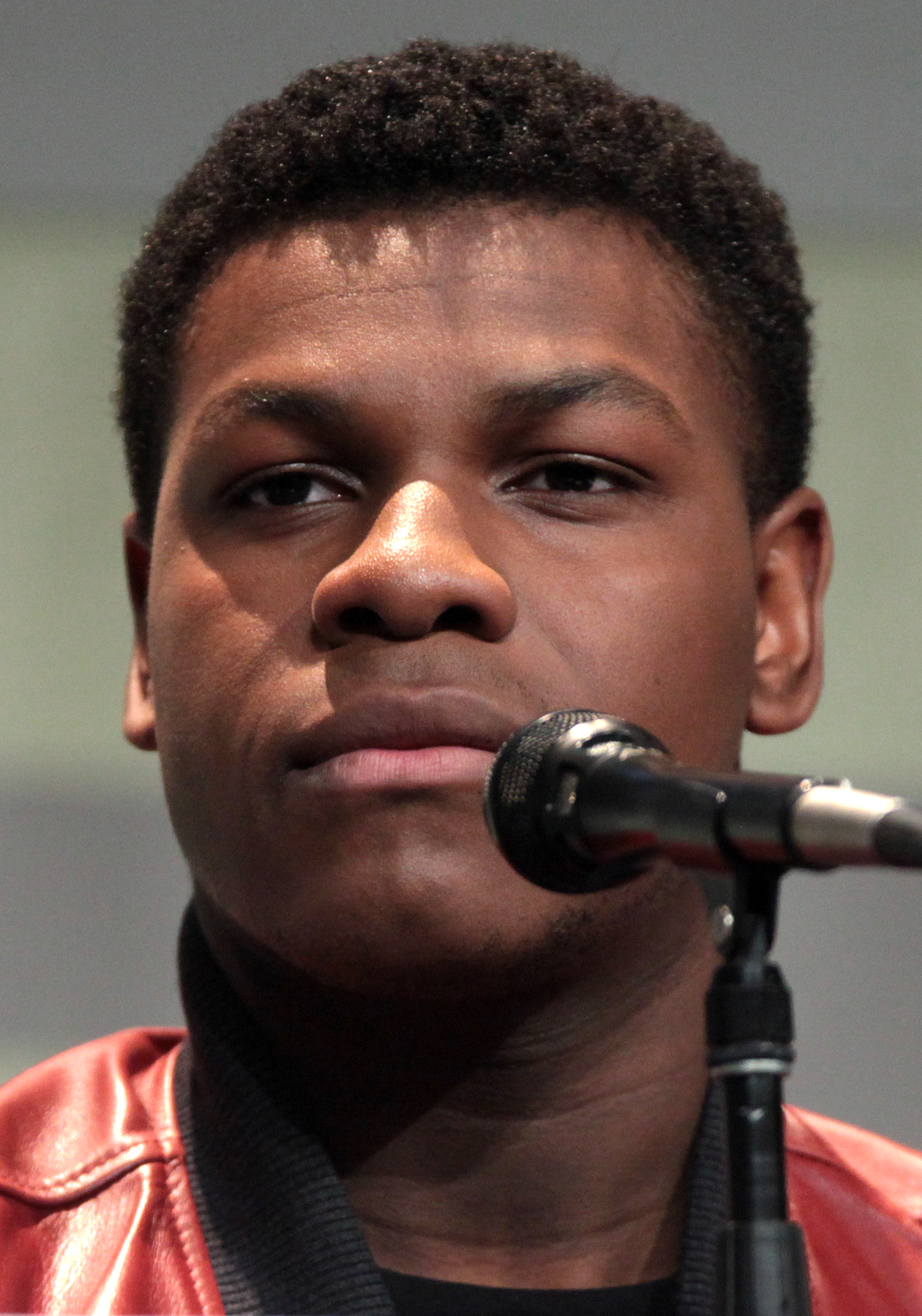
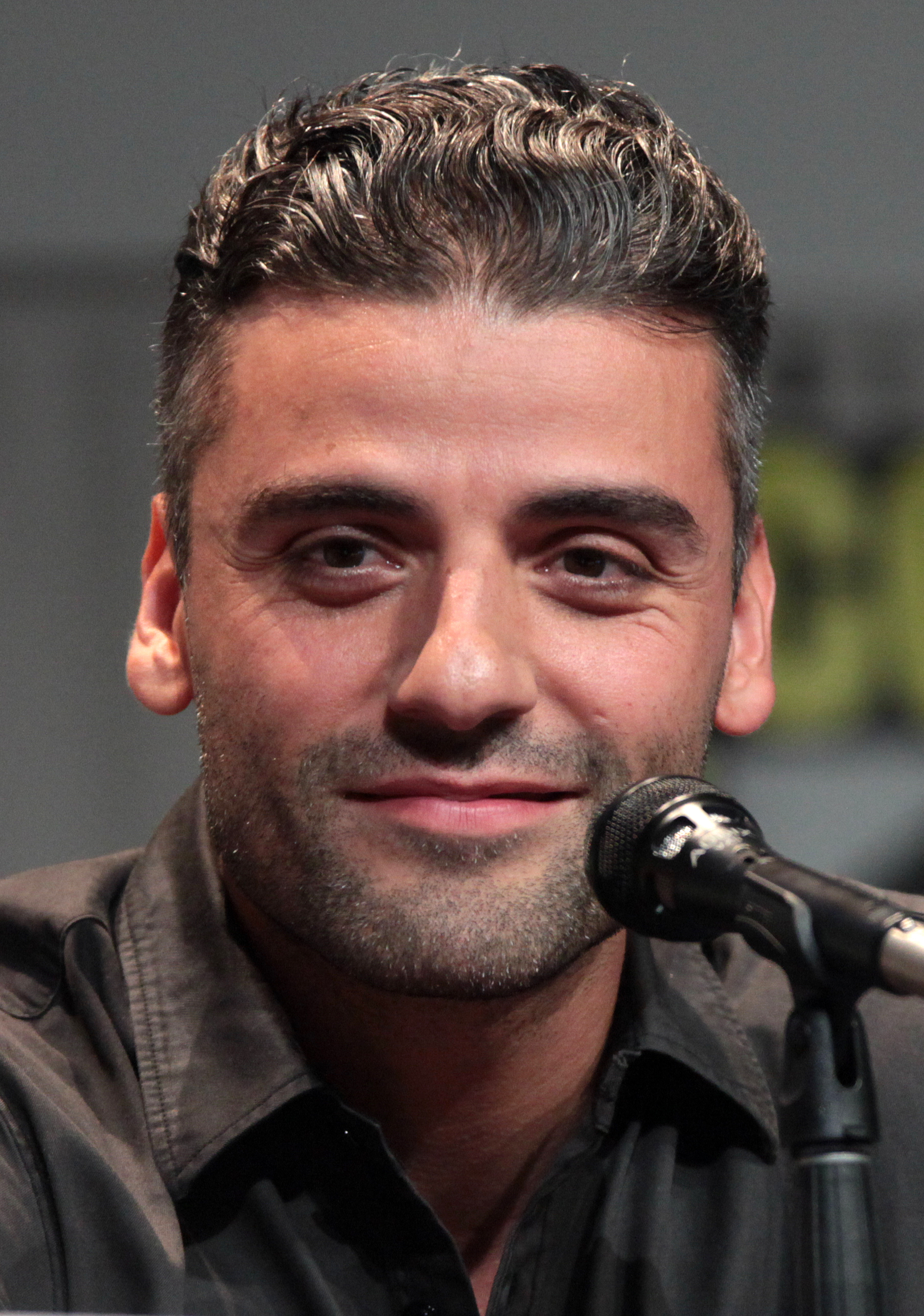
The main cast of the sequel trilogy is played by Adam Driver (Kylo Ren), Daisy Ridley (Rey), John Boyega (Finn), and Oscar Isaac (Poe Dameron), respectively.

After finding Luke Skywalker in self-imposed exile, Rey attempts to convince him to teach her the ways of the Force. She also seeks answers about her past and the conflict between Luke and his nephew Ben Solo (now Kylo Ren). Unbeknownst to Luke, Rey starts using the Force to communicate with Kylo. Meanwhile, Leia leads the Resistance as they are pursued by the First Order, led by Supreme Leader Snoke. Rey leaves Luke in an attempt to redeem Kylo and achieve peace. After Kylo kills Snoke, Rey is forced to choose between ruling the galaxy with him, or helping the outnumbered Resistance survive.

On November 20, 2012, The Hollywood Reporter reported that Lawrence Kasdan and Simon Kinberg would write and produce Episodes VIII and IX, but were later confirmed to be writing standalone films. On June 20, 2014, Looper director Rian Johnson was announced as the writer and director of Episode VIII; he confirmed in August that he would direct. On March 12, 2015, Lucasfilm announced that Johnson would direct Episode VIII with Ram Bergman as producer.

In March 2015, Oscar Isaac confirmed he would reprise his role as Poe Dameron in Episode VIII. In July, it was reported that Benicio del Toro was being considered for a villain; he later confirmed that he had been cast. In September, it was reported that Gugu Mbatha-Raw, Tatiana Maslany, Gina Rodriguez, Olivia Cooke, and Bel Powley were on the shortlist for two separate parts. Jimmy Vee was cast as R2-D2, succeeding Kenny Baker, who would die the next year. Some pre-production filming took place in September 2015 on the island of Skellig Michael, Ireland to take advantage of better weather conditions. Abrams revealed that the film's script was completed in a November 2015 interview with Wired. In December, Hamill, Isaac, Christie, and Boyega were confirmed to reprise their roles as Luke Skywalker, Poe Dameron, Captain Phasma, and Finn, respectively. Kennedy announced at the December 17 London premiere of The Force Awakens that most of its cast would return for Episode VIII.

On January 20, 2016, Lucasfilm and Disney announced that the release of the film would be delayed from May to December 2017. Three days later, the release date of December 15, 2017 was confirmed, as well as the title Star Wars: The Last Jedi. Principal photography began in February 2016; additional filming took place in Dubrovnik from March 9 to March 16, as well as in Ireland in May. Principal photography wrapped in July 2016. Carrie Fisher died on December 27, 2016, but had completed filming her role as Leia. Much of the filming took place at Pinewood Studios near London. Kathleen Kennedy and Ram Bergman were the producers and J. J. Abrams executive produced.

=== Star Wars: The Rise of Skywalker ===
The Rise of Skywalker is the final film of the Skywalker saga, featuring a climactic clash between the Resistance and the First Order, and the Jedi and the Sith. The film is set a year following The Last Jedi and depicts the return of Palpatine, who has been secretly controlling the First Order from the Sith planet Exegol. Palpatine orders Kylo Ren to find and kill Rey, who is revealed to be Palpatine's granddaughter. Palpatine unveils the Final Order, a Sith armada of Star Destroyers, to reclaim the galaxy. Rey and the Resistance learn of Palpatine's return and embark on a quest to find him. They eventually locate Exegol; Rey confronts Palpatine, while the Resistance attack the Sith fleet.

In June 2014, Johnson was announced as writing a story treatment for Episode IX, but later stated he had not been involved with writing the film. In August 2015, Colin Trevorrow was announced as the director of Episode IX, and he, with Derek Connolly, began writing a script draft secretly titled Star Wars: Duel of the Fates. Many elements from that draft survived into the actual film. In February 2016, Disney CEO Bob Iger confirmed that pre-production of Episode IX had begun.

Following the death of Carrie Fisher in late December 2016, media outlets speculated on whether her role would be recast for Episode IX and whether the absence of her character would affect the film's plot. A few weeks later, Lucasfilm stated that they would not digitally recreate Fisher's performance for the film. In April 2017, Kathleen Kennedy stated that Fisher would not be in Episode IX, but it was later announced that Fisher would in fact appear using unreleased footage from The Force Awakens. In August, it was reported that Jack Thorne would rewrite the script.

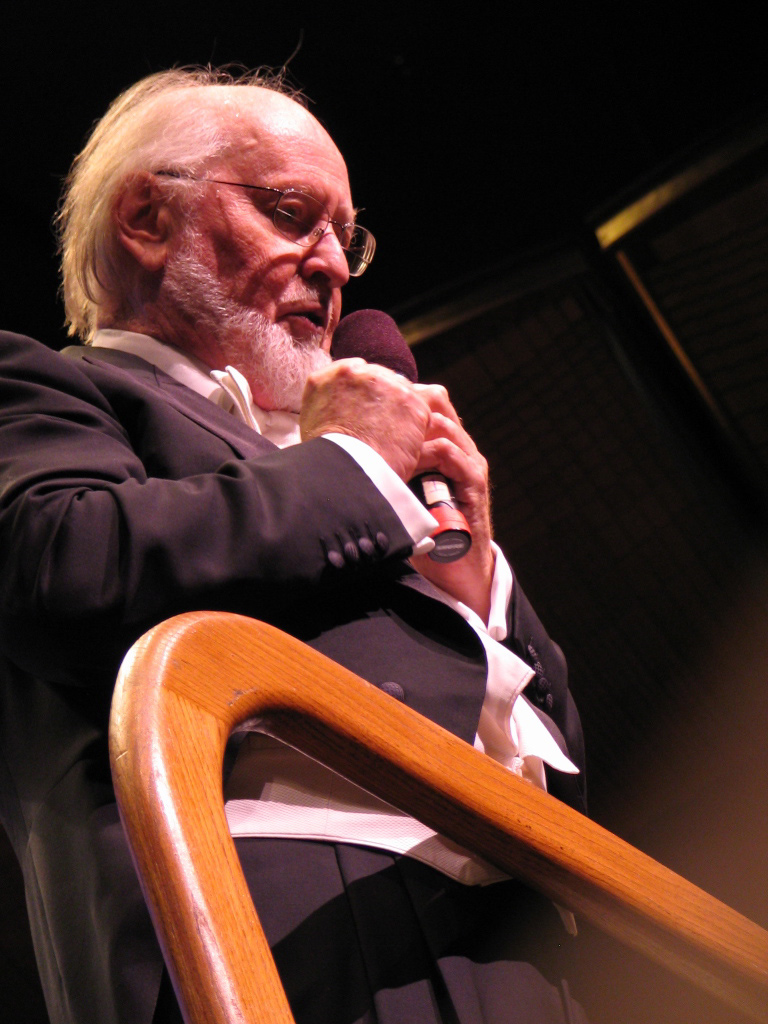
John Williams, composer of the scores for the film trilogies, has stated that The Rise of Skywalker will be his last involvement with the franchise.

In September 2017, Lucasfilm announced that Trevorrow had stepped down as director, and a week later, it was announced that J. J. Abrams would return to direct Episode IX. He co-wrote the script with Chris Terrio, in addition to producing the film through Bad Robot with Kennedy and Michelle Rejwan. Disney had originally scheduled the film's release for December 2019, in keeping with the previous two sequel trilogy films, but then moved it up to May 24, a time of the year more common to the first six Star Wars episodes. However, after Abrams' return, its release date was moved back to December.

On January 10, 2018, it was reported that John Williams would return to compose and conduct the music for Episode IX. The next month, Williams announced that it would be the last Star Wars film music he would compose.

On July 6, 2018, it was reported that Keri Russell was in early talks for a role in Episode IX. On July 9, The Hollywood Reporter reported that Billy Dee Williams was confirmed to reprise the role of Lando Calrissian. On July 27, the official casting announcement was made, including the return of Daisy Ridley, Adam Driver, John Boyega, Oscar Isaac, Lupita Nyong'o, Domhnall Gleeson, Kelly Marie Tran, Joonas Suotamo, Billie Lourd, Mark Hamill, and Anthony Daniels, with Naomi Ackie and Richard E. Grant joining the cast. The same announcement confirmed Williams' return and that Carrie Fisher would posthumously portray Leia Organa using unreleased footage from The Force Awakens. Lucasfilm also initially had plans to include unseen footage of Fisher from The Last Jedi, but it was ultimately not used in the film. It was announced later the same day that Russell had joined the cast. On April 12, at the 2019 Star Wars Celebration, the title for Episode IX was confirmed to be The Rise of Skywalker. Principal photography began on August 1, 2018, and wrapped on February 15, 2019. The Rise of Skywalker was released in the United States on December 20, 2019.

== Themes ==
According to J. J. Abrams and Chris Terrio, the trilogy's core theme is about learning from the previous generation, akin to the Americans in the War of 1812, who preserved what was fought for in the American Revolutionary War. On the inspiration for the First Order formed "from the ashes of the Empire", Abrams spoke of conversations the writers had about how the Nazis could have escaped to Argentina after World War II and "started working together again."

Polygon considers that The Last Jedi's portrayal of Luke Skywalker as a pacifist Jedi master reflects the Jedi's beliefs as being inspired by the Buddhist religion due to the character's inner conflict towards using a lightsaber and seeing it as a weapon of destruction. The Last Jedi features scenes recalling Akira Kurosawa's Rashomon (1950), utilizing the Rashomon effect when Luke tells Rey that he considered murdering his nephew, Ben Solo, due to sensing his inevitable fall to the dark side. Later, Kylo recounts his perspective, which prompts Luke to tell a third, combined perspective of the event.

According to Adam Driver, Kylo Ren is "morally justified in doing what he thinks is right". The Rise of Skywalker depicts Kylo Ren having his helmet repaired following its destruction in The Last Jedi. Abrams compared the fractured mask to Kintsugi, a Japanese ceramic art of repairing broken pottery which accentuates the breakage. While the helmet obscures his vulnerabilities in The Force Awakens, its fractured form in The Rise of Skywalker instead communicates the fractured nature of his character. Kylo overcomes and kills his father in The Force Awakens before reconciling with his memory of him in The Rise of Skywalker; according to Terrio, this reconciliation represents the "Atonement with the Father" stage of the hero's journey, which the Star Wars films are heavily patterned on.

Rey's journey mirrors that of Anakin and Luke in the prequel and original trilogies. The final scene of The Last Jedi depicts servant children playing with a toy of Luke, with one boy using the Force to grab a broom. According to Inverse, this symbolizes that "the Force can be found in people with humble beginnings." A writer for the same website interprets the end of The Rise of Skywalker as seeing Rey "bury the past" and rejecting "any power her grandfather held over her" in a completion of the hero's journey.

== Reception ==
=== Box office performance ===
The sequel trilogy experienced diminishing box office returns with each succeeding film. Nevertheless, it is the highest-grossing trilogy of the franchise overall, with The Force Awakens ranking as the sixth-highest-grossing film of all time.

Film	U.S. release date	Box office gross			All-time Ranking		Budget	Ref(s)
Film	U.S. release date	U.S. and Canada	Other territories	Worldwide	U.S. and Canada	Worldwide	Budget	Ref(s)
Star Wars: The Force Awakens	December 18, 2015	$936.7 million	$1.132 billion	$2.068 billion	1	5	$535.5 million	
Star Wars: The Last Jedi	December 15, 2017	$620.2 million	$713.3 million	$1.334 billion	15	20	$343.2 million	
Star Wars: The Rise of Skywalker	December 20, 2019	$515.2 million	$558.9 million	$1.074 billion	21	39	$490.2 million	
Total		$2.073 billion	$2.405 billion	$4.477 billion			$1.369 billion	

=== Response from Star Wars filmmakers ===
George Lucas agreed with critics who considered The Force Awakens too derivative of the original trilogy. In an interview with Charlie Rose, Lucas likened his decision to sell Lucasfilm to Disney to a divorce, and outlined the creative differences between him and the producers of The Force Awakens. Lucas described the previous six Star Wars films as his "children" and defended his vision for them, while criticizing The Force Awakens for having a "retro feel", saying: "I worked very hard to make them completely different, with different planets, with different spaceships ... to make it new." Lucas also likened Disney to "white slavers", which drew some criticism. He subsequently apologized for this remark.

In 2016, responding to the complaints of derivativeness, Abrams said, "What was important for me was introducing brand new characters using relationships that were embracing the history that we know to tell a story that is new – to go backwards to go forwards". (Note: In 2017, Abrams said he would not do more remakes or reboots, to instead focus on his own creations, saying: "You know, I do think that if you're telling a story that is not moving anything forward, not introducing anything that's relevant, that's not creating a new mythology or an extension of it, then a complete remake of something feels like a mistake.") The same year, the Disney-produced Star Wars anthology film Rogue One was released, and it was reported that Lucas liked it more than The Force Awakens. In 2017, Lucas described the sequel The Last Jedi as "beautifully made".

Marcia Lucas, George Lucas's ex-wife, who was an editor of all three original films and won an Oscar for her work on the first, criticized the Disney sequels in an interview with J. W. Rinzler for his posthumous final book, Howard Kazanjian: A Producer's Life. She stated that Kennedy and Abrams didn't understand the franchise.

=== Critical and public response ===
Film	Critical		Public	
Film	Rotten Tomatoes	Metacritic	CinemaScore	PostTrak
Star Wars: The Force Awakens	93% (447 reviews)	80 (55 reviews)	A	90%
Star Wars: The Last Jedi	91% (483 reviews)	84 (56 reviews)	A	89%
Star Wars: The Rise of Skywalker	51% (522 reviews)	53 (61 reviews)	B+	—N/a

The sequel trilogy has received a generally positive reception from critics, being collectively lauded for its emotional weight, lead performances, and visual effects (including the focus on practical effects). However, several have criticized it for being derivative of the original trilogy. Individually, praise has been directed at The Force Awakens for embracing the spirit of the original trilogy, and The Last Jedi for its direction and willingness to take risks. In contrast, The Rise of Skywalker received criticism for its perceived retconning of the plot, characterization, and themes of The Last Jedi, attributed to appeasing a segment of the fanbase to whom the film had proved controversial.

Retrospectively, critics and publications have labelled the fan response to the sequel trilogy as divisive, particularly as a result of the final two installments. Some have commented on the apparent lack of planning for the trilogy's overarching story, feeling that the films appear inconsistent and contradictory from the differing visions of directors J. J. Abrams and Rian Johnson; the latter was alleged to have been given complete creative control for The Last Jedi. CNBC and Paste Magazine criticized the decision not to use a showrunner to helm the trilogy.

=== Accolades ===
==== Academy Awards ====
Academy Awards	Film		
Academy Awards	The Force Awakens	The Last Jedi	The Rise of Skywalker
Academy Awards	88th Academy Awards	90th Academy Awards	92nd Academy Awards
Best Film Editing	Nominated	—N/a	—N/a
Best Original Score	Nominated	Nominated	Nominated
Best Sound Editing	Nominated	Nominated	Nominated
Best Sound Mixing	Nominated	Nominated	—N/a
Best Visual Effects	Nominated	Nominated	Nominated

== Tie-in media ==
In addition to a vast campaign of tie-in media including adaptations and the Journey to Star Wars publishing campaign (released in anticipation of each film), a number of other spin-offs have been released, altogether fleshing out characters and story elements from the trilogy (including some which were cut from it) and tying into earlier eras. Some sources have also pointed out that streaming series The Mandalorian and its spin-offs will likely set up the events of the sequel trilogy.

In November 2021, Kathleen Kennedy revealed that Lucasfilm creatives had been having conversations regarding the future of the trilogy's characters. At Star Wars Celebration Europe 2023, a new film directed by Sharmeen Obaid-Chinoy was announced that would follow Rey as she attempts to rebuild the Jedi Order 15 years after the events of The Rise of Skywalker. Ridley was set to reprise her role as Rey. Kennedy also hinted at the possibility of other Sequel Trilogy characters coming back.

== Works cited ==
- Duncan, Paul (2020). The Star Wars Archives. 1999–2005. TASCHEN. ISBN 978-3-8365-6344-4.
- Hidalgo, Pablo (2020). Star Wars: Fascinating Facts. Portable Press. ISBN 978-1-68412-895-2.
- Jones, Brian Jay (2016). George Lucas: A Life. New York City: Little, Brown and Company. ISBN 978-0-316-25744-2.
- Kaminski, Michael (2008) [2007]. The Secret History of Star Wars. Legacy Books Press. ISBN 978-0-9784652-3-0.
- Szostak, Phil (2015). The Art of Star Wars: The Force Awakens. Abrams Books. ISBN 978-1-4197-1780-2.
- Szostak, Phil (2017). The Art of Star Wars: The Last Jedi. Abrams Books. ISBN 978-1-4197-2705-4.
- Szostak, Phil (2019). The Art of Star Wars: The Rise of Skywalker. Abrams Books. ISBN 978-1-4197-4038-1.
