= Lynwen Brennan =

Welsh corporate executive (born 1967)

Lynwen Brennan CBE
- Born: Lynwen Ann Griffith; June 1967 (age 59); Narberth, Pembrokeshire, Wales
- Occupation: Corporate executive
- Years active: 1999–present
- Employers: Industrial Light & Magic (1999–2015); Lucasfilm (2015–present)
- Title: Co-president of Lucasfilm (2026–present)
- Predecessor: Kathleen Kennedy as president

Lynwen Brennan (born June 1967) is a Welsh corporate executive who serves as co-president of Lucasfilm, a subsidiary of The Walt Disney Company. She has held senior leadership roles within the company and its subsidiary Industrial Light & Magic since 1999.

== Early life and career ==
Lynwen Brennan was born Lynwen Ann Griffith in June 1967, in Narberth, Pembrokeshire, Wales.

Brennan joined Industrial Light & Magic in 1999. She rose through the ranks to become its president in 2009. In 2015, she was appointed General Manager of Lucasfilm. In 2024, she was named President and General Manager of Lucasfilm Business. On January 15, 2026, she was appointed co-president of Lucasfilm, alongside Dave Filoni, succeeding Kathleen Kennedy.

== Accolades ==
In 2016, she was appointed CBE for her services to supporting the UK's visual effects industry. In 2018, Brennan was nominated for a St David Award, the highest accolade the Welsh Government can confer on its civilians. In 2019, she received the "Outstanding Contribution to Film and Television" award at BAFTA Cymru. In 2022, she received the "Lifetime Achievement Award" at the 20th Visual Effects Society Awards. She is a member of the Academy of Motion Picture Arts and Sciences and the British Academy of Film and Television Arts.
