= Kathleen Kennedy (producer) =

American film producer (born 1953)

Kathleen Kennedy CBE
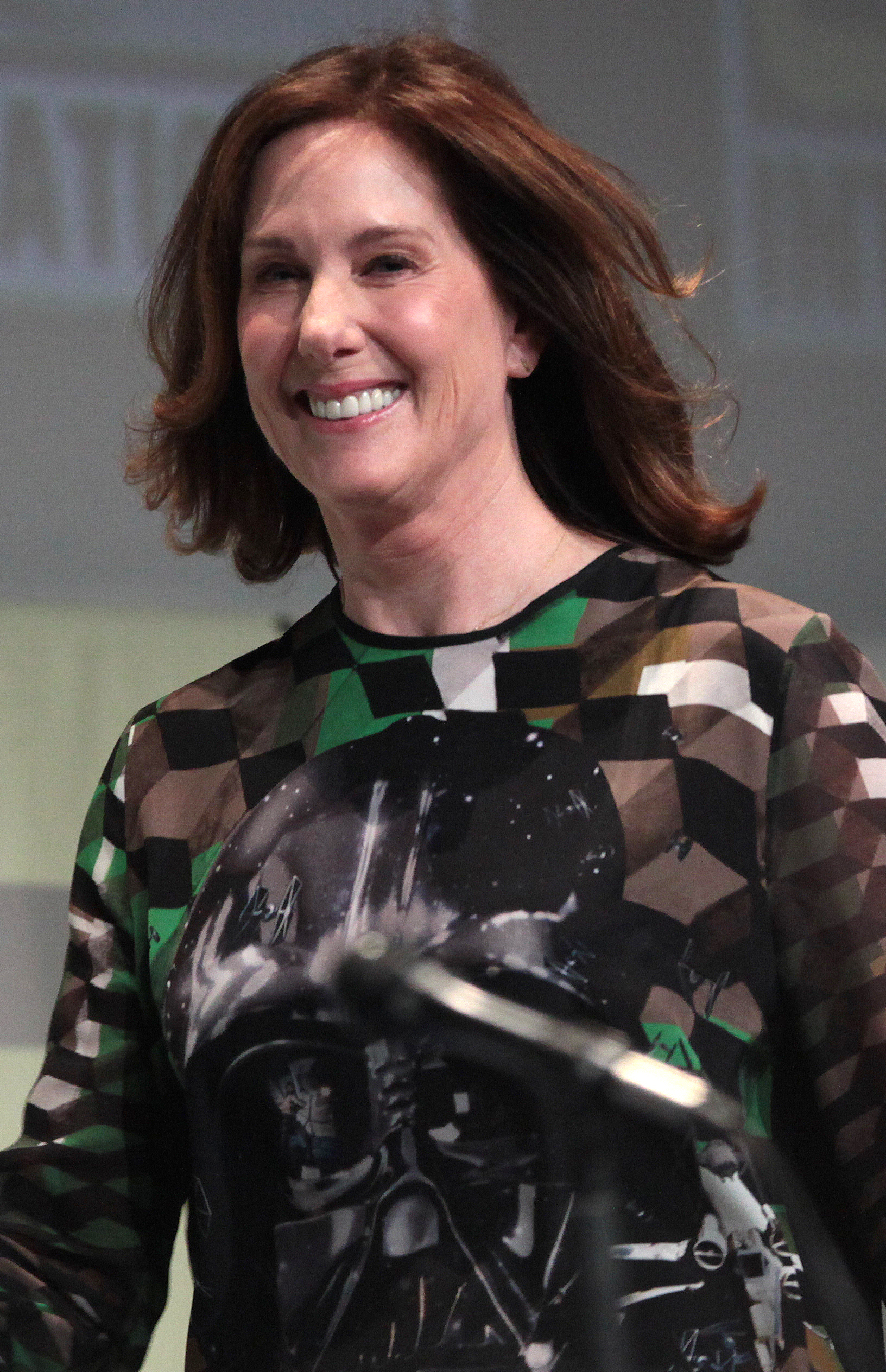
- Kennedy in 2015
- Born: June 5, 1953 (age 73); Berkeley, California, U.S.
- Education: San Diego State University
- Occupation: Film producer
- Years active: 1979–present
- Title: President of Lucasfilm (2012–2026)
- Spouse: Frank Marshall (m. 1987)
- Children: 2

Kathleen Kennedy (born June 5, 1953) is an American film producer who served as the president of Lucasfilm from 2012 to 2026. She co-founded the production company Amblin Entertainment with Steven Spielberg and her eventual husband Frank Marshall in 1981.

Her first film as a producer was E.T. (1982). A decade later, again with Spielberg, she produced the Jurassic Park franchise, the first two of which became two of the top ten highest-grossing films of the 1990s. In 1992, she and Marshall founded the Kennedy/Marshall Company. In 2012, Kennedy became the president of Lucasfilm after the Walt Disney Company acquired the company.

As Lucasfilm's president, Kennedy oversaw the development, production, and release of projects such as the Star Wars sequel trilogy (2015–2019), the Star Wars standalone films Rogue One (2016), Solo (2018), and The Mandalorian and Grogu (2026) as well as the fifth Indiana Jones film, The Dial of Destiny (2023). She also produced various Star Wars series including six live-action series for Disney+, The Mandalorian (2019–2023), The Book of Boba Fett (2021), Obi-Wan Kenobi (2022), Andor (2022–2025), Ahsoka (2023–present), and The Acolyte (2024).

Kennedy has produced films which have earned over $11 billion worldwide, including five of the fifty highest-grossing movies in film history. As a producer, she has received eight Best Picture Academy Award nominations.

== Early life ==
Kathleen Kennedy was born on June 5, 1953, in Berkeley, California, to Donald R. Kennedy, a judge and attorney, and his wife Dione Marie "Dede" (née Dousseau), a one-time theater actress. She has two sisters. Her twin sister, Connie, formerly a location manager in British Columbia, Canada, is now the executive producer of the Virtual Production company Profile Studios. Her other sister is Dana Middleton-Silberstein, a television host and anchor, and press secretary/communications director for former governor Gary Locke (D-WA).

Kennedy graduated from Shasta High School in Redding, California, in 1971. She continued her education at San Diego State University where she majored in telecommunications and film. In her final year, Kennedy gained employment at a local San Diego TV station, KCST (now KNSD), taking on various roles including camera operator, video editor, floor director and finally as KCST news production coordinator.

== Career ==
=== 1978–2011 ===
After her employment with KCST, she produced a local talk show entitled You're On for the station for four years, before moving to Los Angeles. In Los Angeles, Kennedy secured her first film production job working as an assistant to John Milius, who at the time was executive producer of Spielberg's 1941 (1979).

While working under Milius during the production of 1941, Kennedy caught the attention of Steven Spielberg, who stated in 2015:

She was horrible at taking notes... but what she did know how to do was interrupt somebody in midsentence. We'd be pitching ideas back and forth, and Kathy—who was supposed to be writing these ideas down—suddenly put her pencil down and would say something like, "And what if he didn't get the girl, but instead he got the dog?"

Spielberg asked Kennedy to become his secretary for her organizational abilities, and Kennedy gradually took on larger roles in the moviemaking process. Kennedy was credited as associate to Spielberg on Raiders of the Lost Ark (1981), then associate producer on Spielberg's production of Tobe Hooper's Poltergeist (1982).

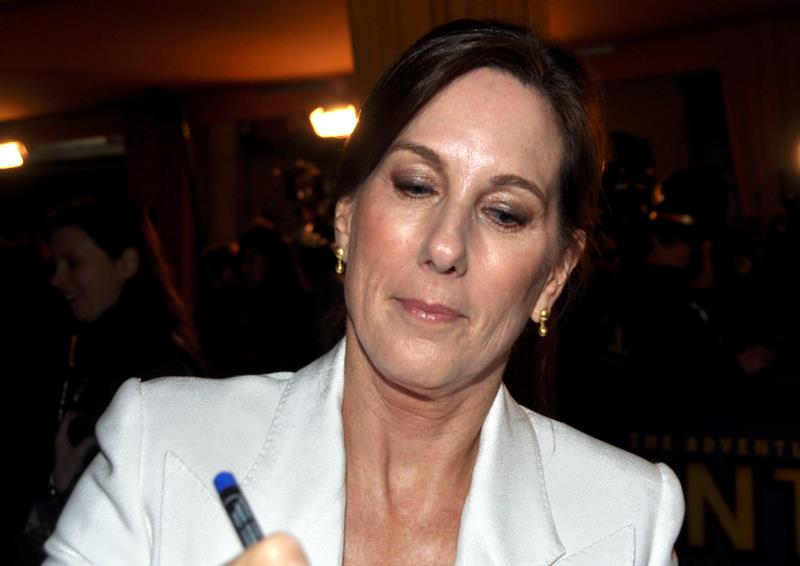
Kennedy during the Paris premiere of The Adventures of Tintin, 2011

Kennedy began receiving producer credit with Spielberg on the major box-office hit E.T. the Extra-Terrestrial (1982), and continued serving the role on most of his films for the next three decades. In 1982, she helped co-found and run the production company Amblin Entertainment with Spielberg and her future husband Frank Marshall. She also produced Indiana Jones and the Temple of Doom (1984) with George Lucas and Marshall, and appeared in the film's opening sequence as a dancer. Following her work on the Indiana Jones films, she rose to become one of Hollywood's leading producers. With Amblin, she produced the Back to the Future trilogy, collaborating with such directors as Martin Scorsese, Robert Zemeckis, Barry Levinson, and Clint Eastwood. In 1991, she and Marshall formed The Kennedy/Marshall Company with a deal at DreamWorks. She continued her business relationship with Spielberg and became producer for Jurassic Park (1993) and executive producer for the historical drama Schindler's List (also 1993). Non-Spielberg films that she produced during this time include The Bridges of Madison County (1995), Twister (1996), and The Sixth Sense (1999).

Kennedy was a producer on the Spielberg films War of the Worlds and Munich (both 2005), the latter of which earned her an Academy Award nomination. Marshall and Kennedy were producers for the US versions of two Studio Ghibli animated features Ponyo (2009) and The Secret World of Arrietty (2012). She also produced Spielberg's Lincoln (2012), which was nominated for seven Golden Globes and twelve Academy Awards.

=== 2012–present ===
In May 2012, she stepped down from The Kennedy/Marshall Company, leaving Marshall as sole principal of their film company. In the following month, Kennedy became co-chair of Lucasfilm Ltd. alongside George Lucas. On October 30, 2012, when Lucas sold his company to Disney, Kennedy was promoted to president. She played a key role in revitalizing Star Wars, overseeing the sequel trilogy starting with The Force Awakens in 2015 and the acclaimed spin-off Rogue One. Kennedy also expanded the franchise into streaming with series like The Mandalorian and Andor.

Despite this success, her future at Lucasfilm was the subject of speculation. The Force Awakens remains the highest-grossing domestic film at $936 million ($2 billion worldwide), but subsequent films saw diminishing returns. The Rise of Skywalker earned $1 billion, about half of The Force Awakens. This followed Solo: A Star Wars Story, the first Star Wars film to lose money at the box office. According to insiders, a succession plan to find her replacement was underway for a couple of years, but she still did not know when she would step down as the head of Lucasfilm.

On January 15, 2026, Kennedy announced she was stepping down as president of Lucasfilm, appointing Dave Filoni and Lynwen Brennan as co-presidents.

== Filmography ==
=== Film ===
Producer

- E.T. the Extra-Terrestrial (1982)
- The Color Purple (1985)
- The Money Pit (1986)
- Empire of the Sun (1987)
- Always (1989)
- Arachnophobia (1990)
- Hook (1991)
- Alive (1993)
- Jurassic Park (1993)
- Milk Money (1994)
- The Bridges of Madison County (1995)
- Congo (1995)
- The Indian in the Cupboard (1995)
- Twister (1996)
- The Sixth Sense (1999)
- Snow Falling on Cedars (1999)
- A Map of the World (1999)
- Jurassic Park III (2001)
- A.I. Artificial Intelligence (2001)
- Seabiscuit (2003)
- War of the Worlds (2005)
- Munich (2005)
- The Diving Bell and the Butterfly (2007)
- The Curious Case of Benjamin Button (2008)
- Hereafter (2010)
- The Adventures of Tintin (2011)
- War Horse (2011)
- Lincoln (2012)
- Star Wars: The Force Awakens (2015)
- Rogue One: A Star Wars Story (2016)
- Star Wars: The Last Jedi (2017)
- Solo: A Star Wars Story (2018)
- Star Wars: The Rise of Skywalker (2019)
- Indiana Jones and the Dial of Destiny (2023)
- The Mandalorian and Grogu (2026)
- Star Wars: Starfighter (2027)

Executive producer

- Gremlins (1984)
- Fandango (1985)
- The Goonies (1985)
- Back to the Future (1985)
- Young Sherlock Holmes (1985)
- An American Tail (1986)
- Batteries Not Included (1987)
- Who Framed Roger Rabbit (1988)
- Tummy Trouble (1989)
- Dad (1989)
- Back to the Future Part II (1989)
- Joe Versus the Volcano (1990)
- Back to the Future Part III (1990)
- Gremlins 2: The New Batch (1990)
- Roller Coaster Rabbit (1990)
- A Brief History of Time (1991) (uncredited)
- An American Tail: Fievel Goes West (1991)
- Cape Fear (1991)
- Noises Off (1992)
- Trail Mix-Up (1993)
- A Far Off Place (1993)
- We're Back! A Dinosaur's Story (1993)
- Schindler's List (1993)
- A Dangerous Woman (1993)
- The Flintstones (1994)
- Balto (1995)
- The Best of Roger Rabbit (1996)
- The Lost World: Jurassic Park (1997)
- Olympic Glory (1999)
- Signs (2002)
- The Young Black Stallion (2003)
- Indiana Jones and the Kingdom of the Crystal Skull (2008)
- The Last Airbender (2010)
- The Secret World of Arrietty (2012) (U.S. version)
- The BFG (2016)
- The Girl on the Train (2016)

Associate producer

- Raiders of the Lost Ark (1981) (associate to Steven Spielberg)
- Poltergeist (1982)
- Twilight Zone: The Movie (1983) (Segment "Time Out")
- Indiana Jones and the Temple of Doom (1984)
- The China Odyssey: 'Empire of the Sun' (1987)
- Indiana Jones and the Last Crusade (1989)
- Persepolis (2007)

Co-executive producer

- Innerspace (1987)
- The Land Before Time (1988)

Co-producer

- Ponyo (2009) (U.S. version)

=== Television ===
Producer

- The Mandalorian (2019–2023)
- The Book of Boba Fett (2021–2022)
- Obi-Wan Kenobi (2022)
- Light & Magic (2022)
- Andor (2022–2025)
- Willow (2022)
- Ahsoka (2023–present)
- The Acolyte (2024)
- Skeleton Crew (2024)

Executive producer

- A Wish for Wings That Work (1991) (TV short)
- The Sports Pages (2001) (TV movie)

== Accolades ==
She has received eight Academy Award for Best Picture nominations as a producer. Five of the nominations are for Spielberg directed projects such as E.T.: The Extra Terrestrial (1982), The Color Purple (1985), Munich (2005), War Horse (2011), and Lincoln (2012). Her other three nominations are for The Sixth Sense (1999), Seabiscuit (2003), and The Curious Case of Benjamin Button (2008). As a producer, she is third behind Kevin Feige and Spielberg in domestic box office receipts, with over $7.5 billion as of 2020. In 2019 she received the Irving G. Thalberg Memorial Award along with Marshall. That same year Kennedy was appointed an honorary commander of the Order of the British Empire, for services to film production in the United Kingdom. In that same year, it was announced that she would receive the BAFTA Fellowship in 2020.

During the 1980s and 1990s, Kennedy served on the advisory board of the National Student Film Institute and in 1991 was a "Grimmy Award" recipient in recognition for her outstanding support of student film making. Kennedy was also an Honorary Chairperson of the institute. In 1995, she was awarded the Women in Film Crystal Award for outstanding women who, through their endurance and the excellence of their work, have helped to expand the role of women within the entertainment industry. In 1996, she and Marshall received the American Academy of Achievement's Golden Plate Award. For the 2001–02 period, she was co-president (with Tim Gibbons) of the Producers Guild of America. In 2007, Kennedy was the first recipient of Women in Film's Paltrow Mentorship Award, for showing extraordinary commitment to mentoring and supporting the next generation of filmmakers and executives.

Kennedy won the Children's and Family Emmy Award for Outstanding Young Teen Series as an executive producer for Star Wars: Skeleton Crew at the 4th Children's and Family Emmy Awards. Skeleton Crew was the most nominated show at the ceremony with a record-breaking seventeen nominations.

As co-producer of Music by John Williams, Kennedy won the Grammy Award for Best Music Film in 2026.
