= Letterman Digital Arts Center =

Office complex in San Francisco, US

Coordinates: 37.79981°N 122.44926°W

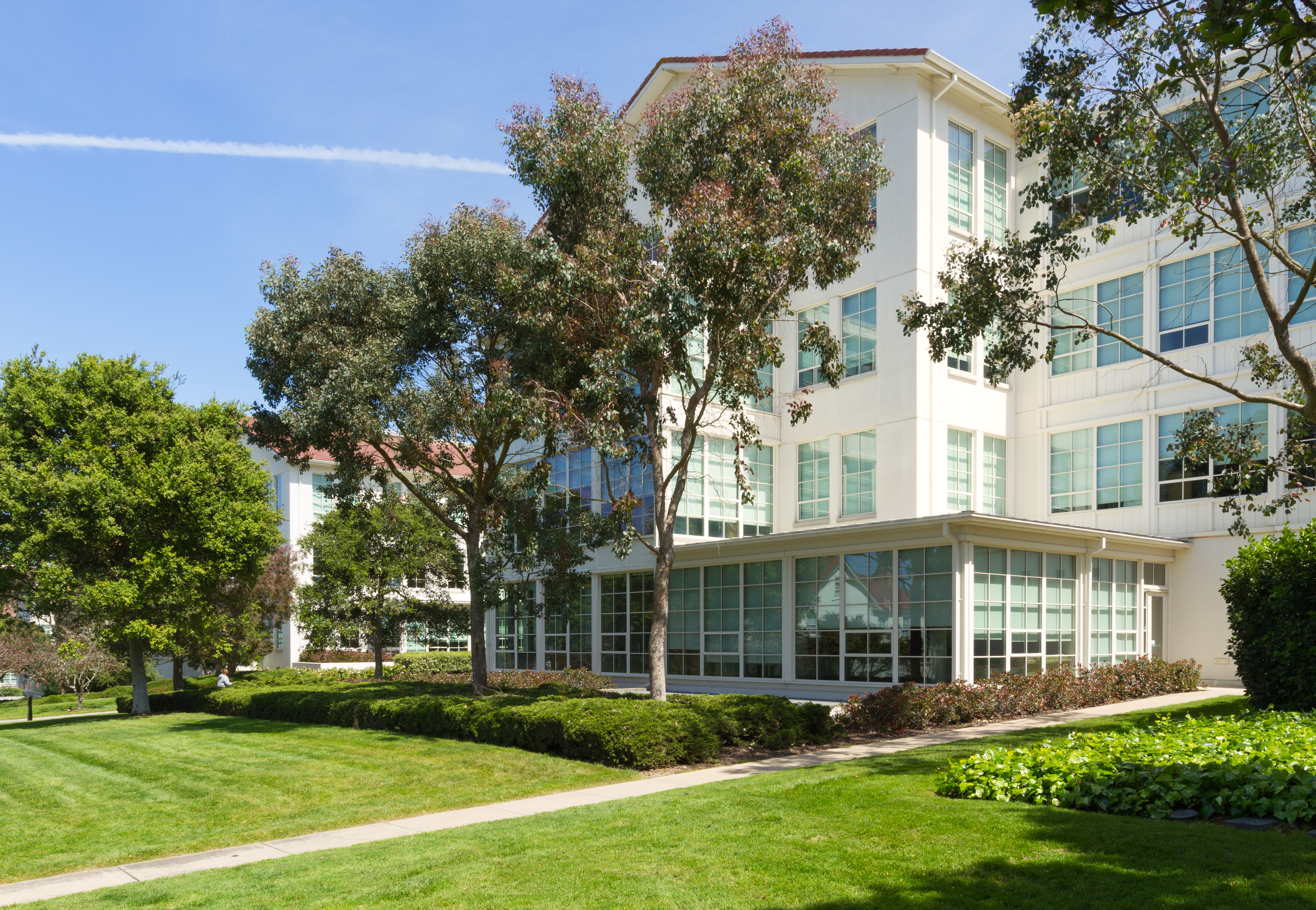
- Side view of Building B of the Letterman Digital Arts Center
- Interactive map of the Letterman Digital Arts Center area

General information
- Location: Presidio, San Francisco, California, United States
- Opened: 2005
- Client: Lucasfilm

The Letterman Digital Arts Center (LDAC) is an institution located in the Presidio, San Francisco, that has served as the combined home of Industrial Light & Magic, Lucasfilm Games, Lucasfilm Animation and Lucasfilm's marketing, online, and licensing units since 2005.

== History ==
Opening ceremonies were held June 25, 2005. The $350 million, 850,000 square foot (79,000 m^{2}) center is home to 1,500 employees, who began moving there in July, 2005. The grounds were designed by landscape architect Lawrence Halprin, who has also restored San Francisco's Ghirardelli Square. The design architect for the buildings was Gensler, and architect of record was HKS, Inc.

The Lobby of Building B is open to the public during regular business hours and contains a gallery of Lucasfilm memorabilia including props and costumes from the Star Wars film series. On the patio near the entrance to Building B is a fountain featuring a life-sized statue of Yoda. Starting in 2026, there is also a General Store at Letterman a short walk from the fountain selling Star Wars products and merchandise as well as wine and food items from Skywalker Ranch.

The Presidio is a former U.S. Army base. The arts center takes its name from its location on the former site of the army's Letterman Army Hospital, which was named for Dr. Jonathan Letterman, medical director for the Army of the Potomac in the U.S. Civil War.

The building earned a LEED Gold certification. One of the reasons was the building was built from the recycled remains of the building it replaced, the Letterman Army Hospital.

As of 2025, over 50 businesses operated out of the Arts Center.
