= Lucasfilm =

American film and TV production company

Lucasfilm Ltd. LLC

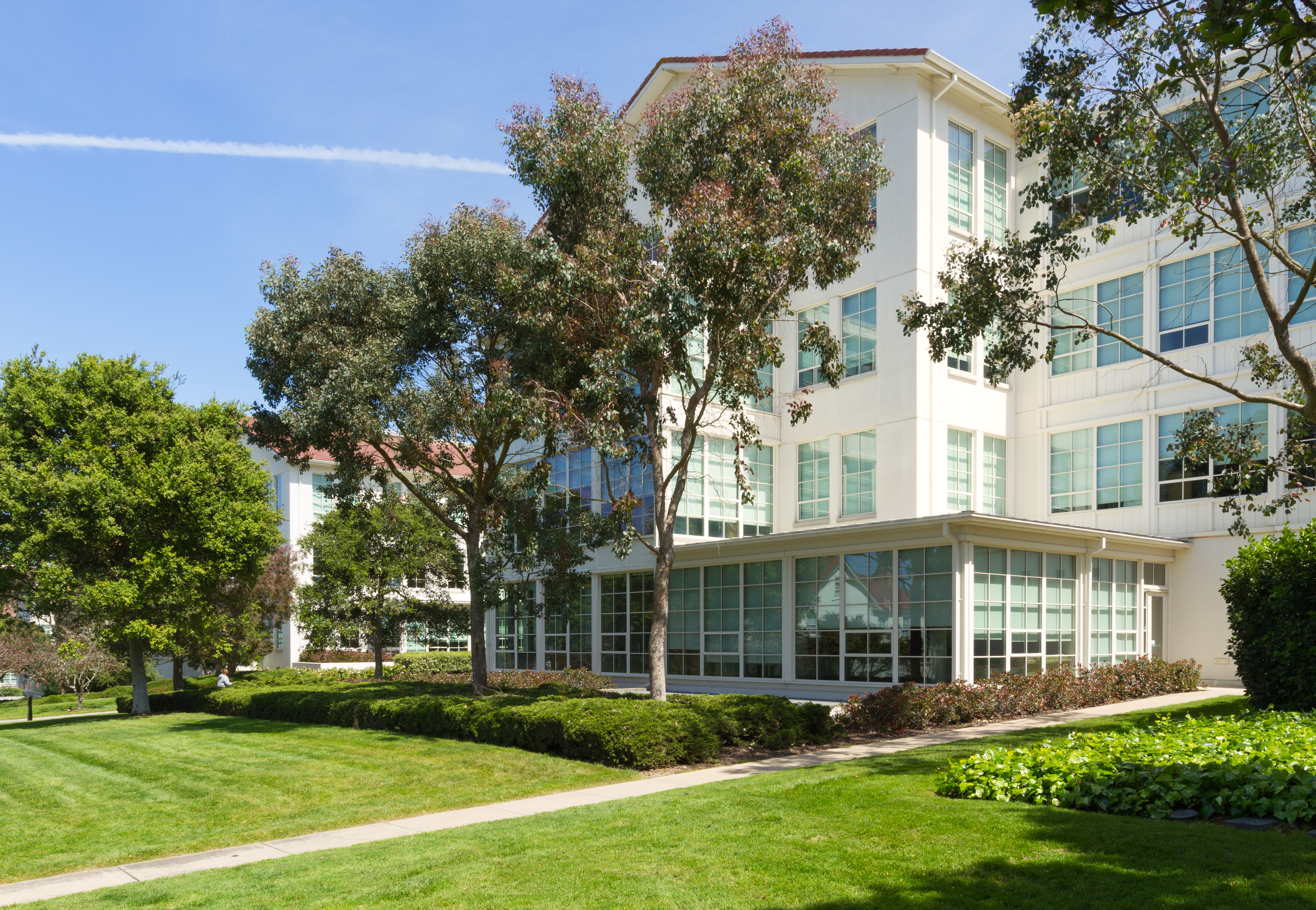
- Lucasfilm headquarters at the Letterman Digital Arts Center
- Trade name: Lucasfilm Ltd
- Formerly: Lucasfilm (1971–1977); Lucasfilm Ltd. (1977–2012)
- Type: Subsidiary
- Industry: Film; Television; Animation
- Founded: December 10, 1971; 54 years ago, in Marin County, California, US
- Founder: George Lucas
- Headquarters: Letterman Digital Arts Center, San Francisco, California, US
- Number of locations: 6
- Area served: Worldwide
- Key people: Dave Filoni (president & CCO); Lynwen Brennan (co-president); Carrie Beck (EVP, production & development); Momita SenGupta (EVP, physical production)
- Brands: Star Wars; Indiana Jones
- Owner: The Walt Disney Company
- Number of employees: 2,000 (2015)
- Parent: The Walt Disney Studios (2012–present)
- Divisions: Industrial Light & Magic; Skywalker Sound; The Graphics Group (1979–1986); THX (1983–2002)
- Subsidiaries: Lucasfilm Animation; Lucasfilm Games
- Website: www.lucasfilm.com

Lucasfilm Ltd. LLC is an American film and television production company founded by filmmaker George Lucas on December 10, 1971, in Marin County, California, in the city of San Rafael, and later moved to San Francisco in 2005. It is best known for creating and producing the Star Wars and Indiana Jones franchises, as well as its leadership in developing special effects, sound, and computer animation for films. Since 2012, Lucasfilm has been a subsidiary of the Walt Disney Studios, who also owns former Lucasfilm subsidiary Pixar.

The company's films Star Wars: Episode I – The Phantom Menace (1999), Star Wars: Episode VII — The Force Awakens (2015), Rogue One: A Star Wars Story (2016), Star Wars: Episode VIII — The Last Jedi (2017), and Star Wars: Episode IX — The Rise of Skywalker (2019) are all among the 50 highest-grossing films of all time, with The Force Awakens becoming the highest-grossing film in the United States and Canada. On October 30, 2012, Disney acquired Lucasfilm for $4.05 billion in the form of cash and in stock (equivalent to about $6 billion today). Lucasfilm is currently one of five live-action film studios within the Walt Disney Studios, alongside Walt Disney Pictures and Marvel Studios.

== History ==
=== Independent era (1971–2012) ===
Lucasfilm was founded by filmmaker George Lucas on December 10, 1971, in Marin County, California, in the city of San Rafael. Some scenes in Lucasfilm's first production, American Graffiti (1973), were filmed in downtown San Rafael under Lucas's direction. It was released to critical and commercial success. By the mid-1970s, the company's offices were located on the Universal Studios Lot. Pre-production of the film that would become Star Wars: Episode IV — A New Hope (1977) began during production of American Graffiti. After funding of Star Wars was rejected by Universal, and after the success of American Graffiti, Lucas successfully pitched Star Wars to 20th Century-Fox. Star Wars, Lucasfilm's second production, underwent a limited release on May 25, 1977 to critical acclaim and box-office success. The company was incorporated as Lucasfilm Ltd. on September 12, 1977. Lucas founded the Star Wars Corporation, Inc. as a subsidiary to control various legal and financial aspects of A New Hope, including copyright, and sequel and merchandising rights. It also produced the 1978 Star Wars Holiday Special for 20th Century Fox Television. That year, Lucas hired Los Angeles-based real-estate specialist Charles Weber to manage the company, telling him that he could keep the job as long as he made money. Lucas wanted to focus on making independent films for the company, but the company gradually grew from five employees to almost 100, increasing in middle management and running up costs. In 1980, after Weber asked Lucas for $50 million to invest in other companies and suggested that they sell the Skywalker Ranch to do so, Lucas fired Weber and had to let half of the Los Angeles staff go. By the same year, the corporate subsidiary had been discontinued and its business was absorbed into the various divisions of Lucasfilm. That same year, the second Star Wars film Star Wars: Episode V — The Empire Strikes Back was released in cinemas.

Between 1981 and 1989, three Indiana Jones films, stories by Lucas and directed by Steven Spielberg, were released. While Star Wars: Episode VI — Return of the Jedi (1983) was in production, Lucas decided not to pursue further Star Wars films. Despite the third film achieving similar classic status to its two predecessors, George was unhappy with the cinema presentation of Return of the Jedi, so he created the company THX, which was unveiled on May 20, 1983. Lucasfilm produced the John Korty-directed animated film Twice Upon a Time (1983). 1985 saw the release of Paul Schrader's Mishima: A Life in Four Chapters. The next year, Jim Henson's Labyrinth and an adaptation of Marvel Comics' Howard the Duck were released. Ron Howard directed the fantasy film Willow in 1988 (story by Lucas); the same year the children's animated film The Land Before Time was released. From 1992 to 1993, The Young Indiana Jones Chronicles (created by Lucas) television series was produced. In 1992, after viewing an early computer-generated imagery test created by Industrial Light & Magic (ILM) for Jurassic Park, Lucas announced his intentions to produce a Star Wars Prequel Trilogy. In 1994, the long-delayed Radioland Murders (story by Lucas) was released. In 1995, Lucas began pre-production on the prequel trilogy. The trilogy took ten years to make, ending with the release of the third prequel film Star Wars: Episode III – Revenge of the Sith in 2005. In addition to the prequels, Lucas created the Special Editions of the Original Trilogy in 1997, released theatrically, and on VHS and LaserDisc. Further changes were made in 2004 and 2011, for DVD and Blu-ray.

In 1987, the company, which at that time, was expanding from three to five films a year on its own, decided to increase making its Northern California production facilities available to other filmmakers. In 1989, Lucasfilm launched a new subsidiary Lucasfilm Entertainment Group (later LucasArts Entertainment Company) to consolidate all four units, which are Industrial Light & Magic, Lucasfilm Commercial Productions, Lucasfilm Games, and Sprocket Systems.

In 2005, Lucasfilm opened a new studio in Singapore focusing on animation. That same year, Lucasfilm Animation commenced production of a 3D animated Star Wars television series called Star Wars: The Clone Wars, with key production team members including creator and executive producer George Lucas, executive producer Catherine Winder, supervising director Dave Filoni, Head of Lucasfilm Animation Singapore Chris Kubsch, and Henry Gilroy. Primary production took place at Lucasfilm Animation's Singapore studio. Airing on Cartoon Network between 2008 and 2013, The Clone Wars was well received by fans and was nominated for several film awards including the Daytime Emmy Awards and the Annie Awards.

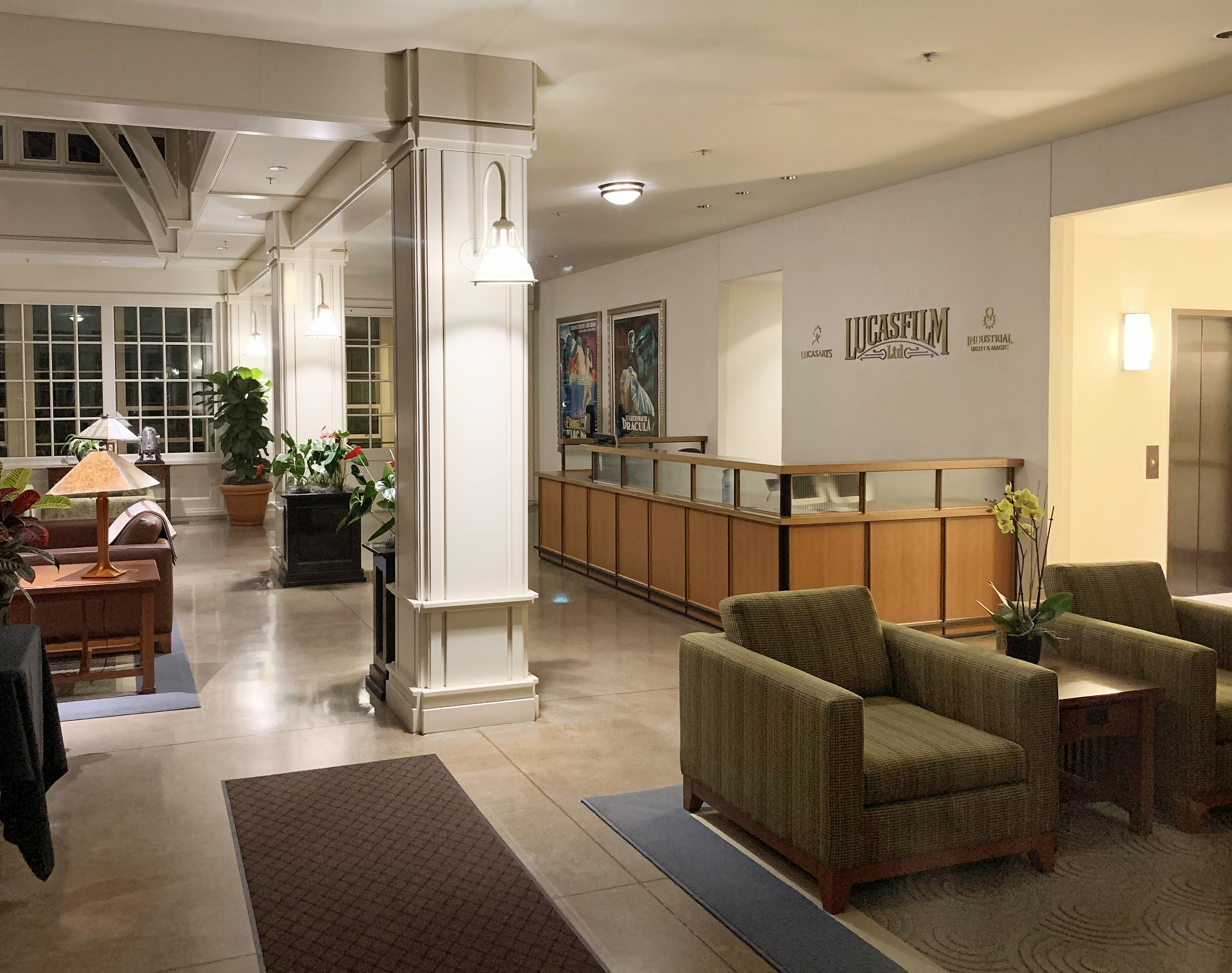
Lucasfilm, LucasArts, Industrial Light & Magic Foyer (Presidio Complex)

In January 2012, Lucas announced his retirement from producing large-scale blockbuster films and instead re-focusing his career on smaller, independently budgeted features. In June 2012, it was announced that Kathleen Kennedy, a long-term collaborator with Steven Spielberg and an executive producer of the Indiana Jones films, had been appointed as co-chair of Lucasfilm. It was reported that Kennedy would work alongside Lucas, who would remain chief executive and serve as co-chair for at least one year, after which she would succeed him as the company's chairperson, which she did in June 2013.

On July 8, 2012, Lucasfilm's marketing, online, and licensing units moved into the new Letterman Digital Arts Center located in the Presidio in San Francisco. It shares the complex with Industrial Light & Magic. Lucasfilm had planned an expansion at the Skywalker Ranch in Marin County, California, but shelved the plan in 2012 due to opposition from neighbors. Skywalker Sound remains the only Lucasfilm division based at Skywalker Ranch.

On September 5, 2012, Micheline Chau, who served as president and COO of Lucasfilm for two decades, announced that she was retiring. With her departure, senior executives for each of the Lucasfilm divisions would report directly to Kathleen Kennedy. Chau was credited with keeping the Lucasfilm and Star Wars brands strong, especially through animation spin-offs and licensing initiatives.

=== Subsidiary of The Walt Disney Studios (2012–present) ===
==== Acquisition process ====
Discussions relating to the possibility of the Walt Disney Company signing a distribution deal with Lucasfilm officially began in May 2011, after George Lucas met with Disney CEO Bob Iger during the re-opening of the Star Tours – The Adventures Continue attraction at Disney's Hollywood Studios. Lucas told Iger that he was considering retirement and planned to sell Lucasfilm, as well as the Star Wars and Indiana Jones franchises. On October 30, 2012, Disney announced a deal to acquire Lucasfilm for $4.05 billion, with approximately half in cash and half in shares of Disney stock. Lucasfilm had previously collaborated with Disney's Walt Disney Imagineering division to create theme park attractions centered on Star Wars and Indiana Jones for various Walt Disney Parks and Resorts worldwide.

Kathleen Kennedy, co-chairwoman of Lucasfilm, became president of Lucasfilm, reporting to the then-Walt Disney Studios Chairman Alan Horn. Additionally, she served as the brand manager for Star Wars, working directly with Disney's global lines of business to build, further integrate, and maximize the value of the franchise. Kennedy served as a producer on new Star Wars feature films, with George Lucas originally announced as serving as a creative consultant. The company also announced the future release of new Star Wars films, starting with Episode VII: The Force Awakens in 2015.

Under the deal, Disney acquired ownership of Star Wars, Indiana Jones, and Lucasfilm's operating businesses in live-action film production, consumer products, video games, animation, visual effects, and audio post-production. Disney also acquired Lucasfilm's portfolio of entertainment technologies. The intent was for Lucasfilm employees to remain in their current locations. Star Wars merchandising would begin under Disney in the fiscal year 2014. Starting with Star Wars Rebels, certain products will be co-branded with the Disney name, akin to what Disney has done with Pixar. On December 4, 2012, the Disney-Lucasfilm merger was approved by the Federal Trade Commission (FTC), allowing the acquisition to be finalized without dealing with antitrust problems. On December 18, 2012, Lucasfilm converted from a corporation to a limited liability company (LLC), changing its name to Lucasfilm Ltd. LLC in the process. On December 21, 2012, Disney completed the acquisition and Lucasfilm became a wholly owned subsidiary of Disney.

At the time of Disney's acquisition of Lucasfilm, 20th Century Fox, the original distributor of the first six Star Wars films, were to retain the physical and theatrical distribution rights to both the prequel trilogy and Episodes V and VI of the original trilogy until May 2020, along with full distribution rights for the original 1977 film in perpetuity. Lucasfilm retained the television and digital distribution rights to Star Wars Episodes I through VI with exception to Episode IV. On March 20, 2019, Disney officially acquired 20th Century Fox after acquiring its owner, 21st Century Fox, thus consolidating all the distribution and ownership rights to all the films under its umbrella. In December 2013, Walt Disney Studios purchased the distribution and marketing rights to future Indiana Jones films from Paramount Pictures, although the latter studio would retain the distribution rights to the first four films and would receive "financial participation" from any additional films. This would make the fifth installment, Indiana Jones and the Dial of Destiny, become the first film in the franchise and Lucasfilm's first film overall to be co-produced by Walt Disney Pictures.

==== Kathleen Kennedy era (2012–2026) ====
In early 2013, Disney CEO Bob Iger disclosed Lucasfilm's plans to release standalone Star Wars films alongside the Sequel Trilogy over a six-year period. This strategy aimed to expand the Star Wars universe beyond the main saga. The first of these standalone films, Rogue One, premiered in 2016, followed by Solo: A Star Wars Story in 2018.

On April 3, 2013, LucasArts, the video game development division of Lucasfilm, underwent closure, resulting in layoffs for most of its staff. Despite this, LucasArts maintained a small team to handle video game licensing. Disney subsequently entered an exclusive agreement with Electronic Arts (EA) to produce Star Wars games for the core gaming market for a decade. LucasArts retained licensing rights, while Disney Interactive Studios focused on casual gaming. Due to lower-than-expected sales, EA's exclusive deal was halted in January 2021, more than three years before their contract was set to expire on October 14, 2024. Lucasfilm was rumored to be courting either Ubisoft or Activision to either replace EA or share rights to develop Star Wars games with them, but after April 3, 2023, EA stepped down from the franchise somewhat, but still continue to make Star Wars game through its subsidiary, Respawn, such as Jedi Survivor and its unannounced sequel.

In January 2014, it was announced that Dark Horse Comics would be losing its license for Star Wars comics to Marvel Comics, another Disney subsidiary, in 2015. That April, Lucasfilm announced that the Star Wars Expanded Universe content would be rebranded as Star Wars Legends, with only selected works, including the six episodic films and The Clone Wars, deemed canon. Additionally, a new line of canon Star Wars books began publication under the Lucasfilm story group. However, Tor.com asserted that book consumers were not given the option of two universes to read from, the first of which is what many of them have been reading about for over 40 years and have grown to love and the second of which is Disney's attempt to unify things under one controllable banner, leaving fans of these books to only read new entries in the Unified Canon, and if they wish to see the continued growth of the Star Wars universe, the previous universe is now stuck in limbo.

Lucasfilm continued its expansion globally, opening its regional headquarters in Singapore in 2014. This facility housed staff from Lucasfilm, The Walt Disney Company Southeast Asia and ESPN Asia Pacific. Meanwhile, between 2015 and 2018, Lucasfilm released several cinematic films, including critical and commercial successes like Episode VII: The Force Awakens and Rogue One, alongside the less successful Solo. On June 20, 2017, Phil Lord and Chris Miller, the directors of the film Solo: A Star Wars Story, left the production of the film five weeks before filming ended. Lord and Miller cited "creative differences" for their reason to part ways with the film. Many compared this to Edgar Wright stepping down as director of Ant-Man due to creative differences with Marvel Studios. Three months later, Star Wars: Episode IX – The Rise of Skywalker director Colin Trevorrow stepped down as director under similar circumstances and was replaced with Star Wars: The Force Awakens director J. J. Abrams.

After the poor performance of Solo at the box office, Disney CEO Bob Iger confirmed a slowdown in release of new Star Wars films. Lucasfilm moved its focus on developing content for Disney+ by launching several programs including the successful series The Mandalorian series on Disney+.

In November 2023, Dave Filoni revealed that he had been promoted to serve as the chief creative officer at the studio and would be directly involved in the planning of future Star Wars films and other media. On January 15, 2026, Kathleen Kennedy announced she was stepping down as president of Lucasfilm. Filoni was appointed president alongside co-president Lynwen Brennan.

== Company structure ==
- Industrial Light & Magic – visual effects
  - Lucas Studio – visual effects
  - ILM Vancouver, ILM London, ILM Mumbai, ILM Sydney
  - ILM Immersive
- Skywalker Sound – post-production sound design
- Lucasfilm Games – video games
- Lucasfilm Animation – animation
- Lucas Licensing – licensing and merchandising
  - Lucas Books – book publishing imprint of Del Rey Books, licensed from Lucasfilm.
- Lucasfilm Story Group (2012–) The first two revealed members were Pablo Hidalgo and Leland Chee, headed by Kiri Hart as Lucasfilm's SVP, Development.

=== Former divisions ===
Former subsidiaries of Lucasfilm are:

Name	Description	Current Status	Details
Pixar Animation Studios	Computer animation studio that was sold to Steve Jobs in 1986.	Active	It became a subsidiary of the Walt Disney Company in 2006, six years prior to Disney's acquisition of Lucasfilm in December 2012.
THX	Theater sound system (spun off from Lucasfilm in 2002)	Active	Creative Technology owned 60% of THX, and then sold to Razer Inc. in 2016.
Kerner Optical	Practical effects division (model shop) and 3D development team (spun off from Industrial Light & Magic in 2006)	Closed	Went bankrupt in 2011.
Lucas Learning	A spinoff of LucasArts for the development of educational software.	Closed	In 2001, Lucas Learning decided to leave the market and shut down this division.
Lucas Online	In house web development company that built and maintained the websites of the other Lucasfilm companies and properties.	Closed	

== Filmography ==
=== Franchises ===
Year	Title	Films	TV Seasons
1973–1979	American Graffiti	2	0
1977–present	Star Wars	13	28
1981–present	Indiana Jones	5	3
1988–2023	Willow	1	1

=== Highest-grossing films ===
Films with a worldwide gross over $100M
Title	Year	Domestic box office	Worldwide box office
Star Wars: The Force Awakens	2015	$936,662,225	$2,071,310,218
Star Wars: The Last Jedi	2017	$620,181,382	$1,334,407,706
Star Wars: The Rise of Skywalker	2019	$515,202,542	$1,077,022,372
Rogue One	2016	$533,539,991	$1,058,684,742
Star Wars: Episode I – The Phantom Menace	1999	$487,576,624	$1,046,515,409
Star Wars: Episode III – Revenge of the Sith	2005	$414,378,291	$905,204,578
Indiana Jones and the Kingdom of the Crystal Skull	2008	$317,101,119	$786,635,413
Star Wars	1977	$460,998,507	$775,398,507
Star Wars: Episode II – Attack of the Clones	2002	$310,676,740	$656,695,615
The Empire Strikes Back	1980	$292,753,960	$549,001,086
Return of the Jedi	1983	$316,566,101	$482,365,284
Indiana Jones and the Last Crusade	1989	$197,171,806	$474,171,806
Solo: A Star Wars Story	2018	$213,767,512	$393,151,347
Raiders of the Lost Ark	1981	$248,159,971	$389,925,971
Indiana Jones and the Dial of Destiny	2023	$174,480,468	$383,963,057
The Mandalorian and Grogu	2026	$177,730,060	$345,723,777
Indiana Jones and the Temple of Doom	1984	$179,870,271	$333,107,271
American Graffiti	1973	$115,000,000	$140,557,835
Willow	1988	$57,269,863	$137,600,000
