= Skywalker Ranch =

Film studio and movie ranch

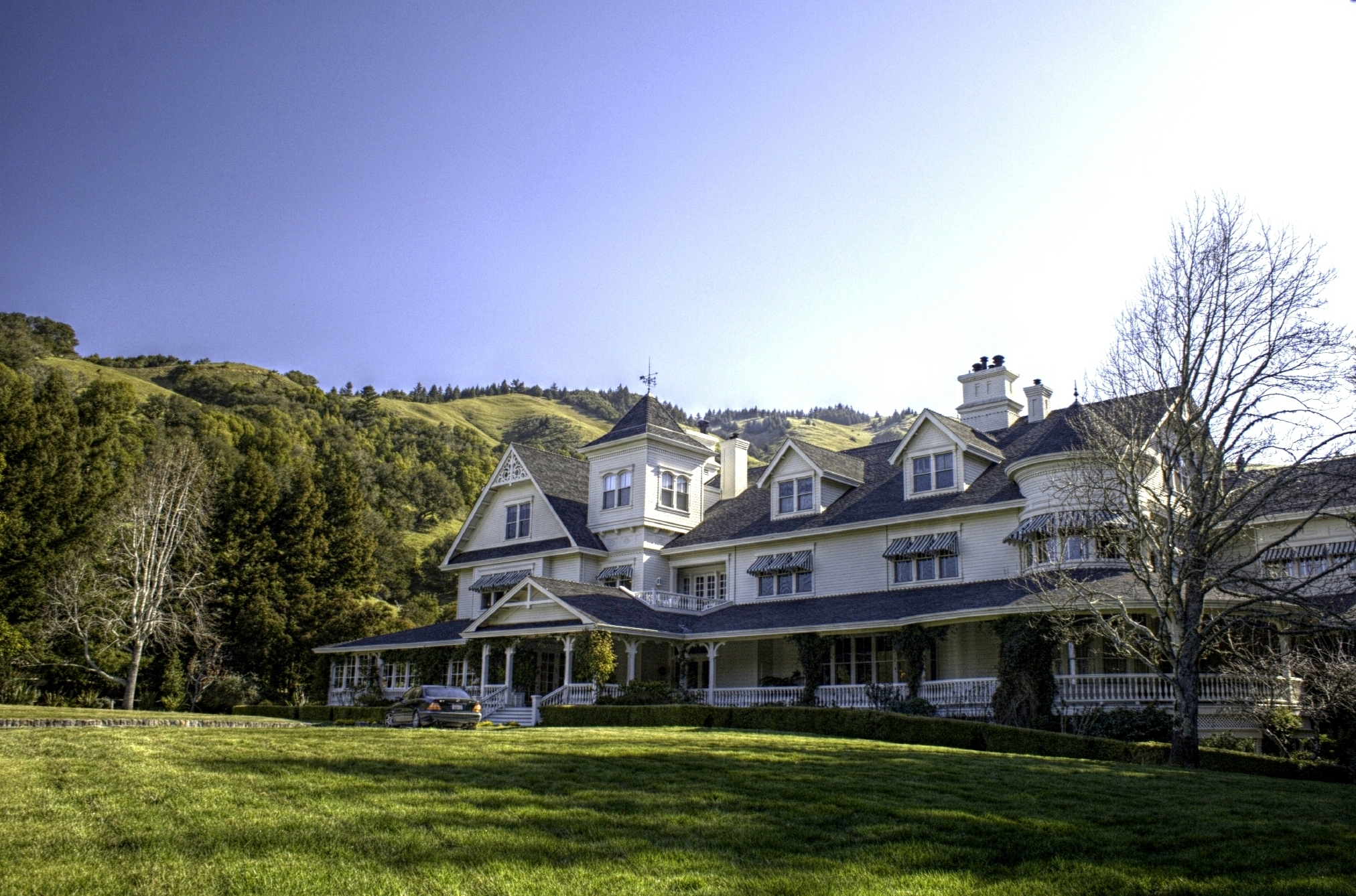
- Skywalker Ranch main house
- Interactive map of Skywalker Ranch
- Location: Marin County, California, U.S.
- Nearest city: Novato
- Coordinates: 38°3′43″N 122°38′38″W
- Area: 4,700 acres (1,900 ha)
- Owner: George Lucas

Skywalker Ranch is a movie ranch and the workplace of film director, writer, and producer George Lucas located in a secluded area near Nicasio, California, in Marin County. The ranch is located on Lucas Valley Road, named after an early-20th-century landowner in the area not related to George Lucas. The ranch is not open to the public.

== Overview ==
The principal operation of the facility is as a motion picture sound mixing and recording facility. Other Lucasfilm properties provide animation and visual effects; Skywalker handles sound, music, and allied services.

In September 1978, George Lucas purchased the first parcel of land, and named it Bulltail Ranch, which in subsequent years became Skywalker Ranch. Lucasfilm acquired 3,000 acres (1,200 ha) of adjoining land for a total of over 4,700 acres (1,900 ha). Only 15 acres (6.1 ha) have been developed. Residents of the area have fought his plan to build a larger studio on the property, citing light and noise pollution.

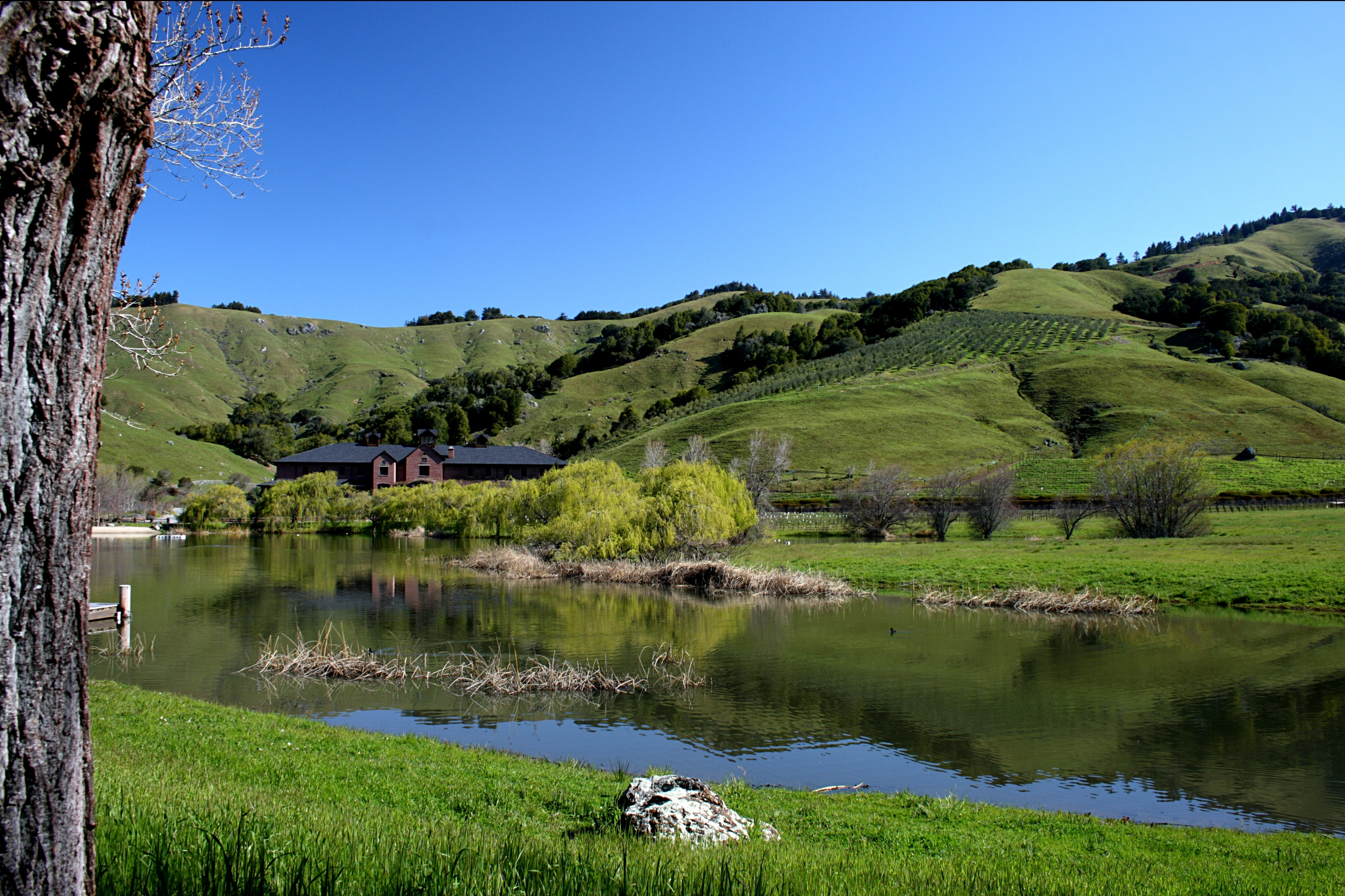
Ewok Lake, a man-made lake at Skywalker Ranch

The Ranch contains a barn with animals, vineyards, a garden with fruits and vegetables used in the on-site restaurant, an outdoor swimming pool and fitness center with racquetball courts, the man-made "Ewok Lake", a hilltop observatory, a 300-seat theater called "The Stag" as well as theater screening rooms, and parking that is mostly concealed underground to preserve the natural landscape. Skywalker Sound was moved onto the ranch in 1987, now occupying the Technical Building. The Main House has a company research library under a stained-glass dome. Skywalker Ranch has its own fire station; it is part of the Marin County mutual aid system and is often called on to assist firefighters in nearby Marinwood.

Skywalker Ranch is intended to be more of a "filmmaker's retreat" than a headquarters for Lucas's business operations. The headquarters of Lucasfilm, Industrial Light & Magic, and LucasArts (now Lucasfilm Games) are located in Lucas's Letterman Digital Arts Center in the Presidio of San Francisco.

The George Lucas Educational Foundation is based at the Ranch. Skywalker Sound remains based at the Ranch, for which Lucasfilm pays a rental fee to George Lucas, who remains the property's owner. Although Lucas maintains his offices there, he does not reside at the Ranch. Lucasfilm Games was located at the ranch during the early company years.

== Nearby Lucas properties ==
=== Big Rock Ranch ===
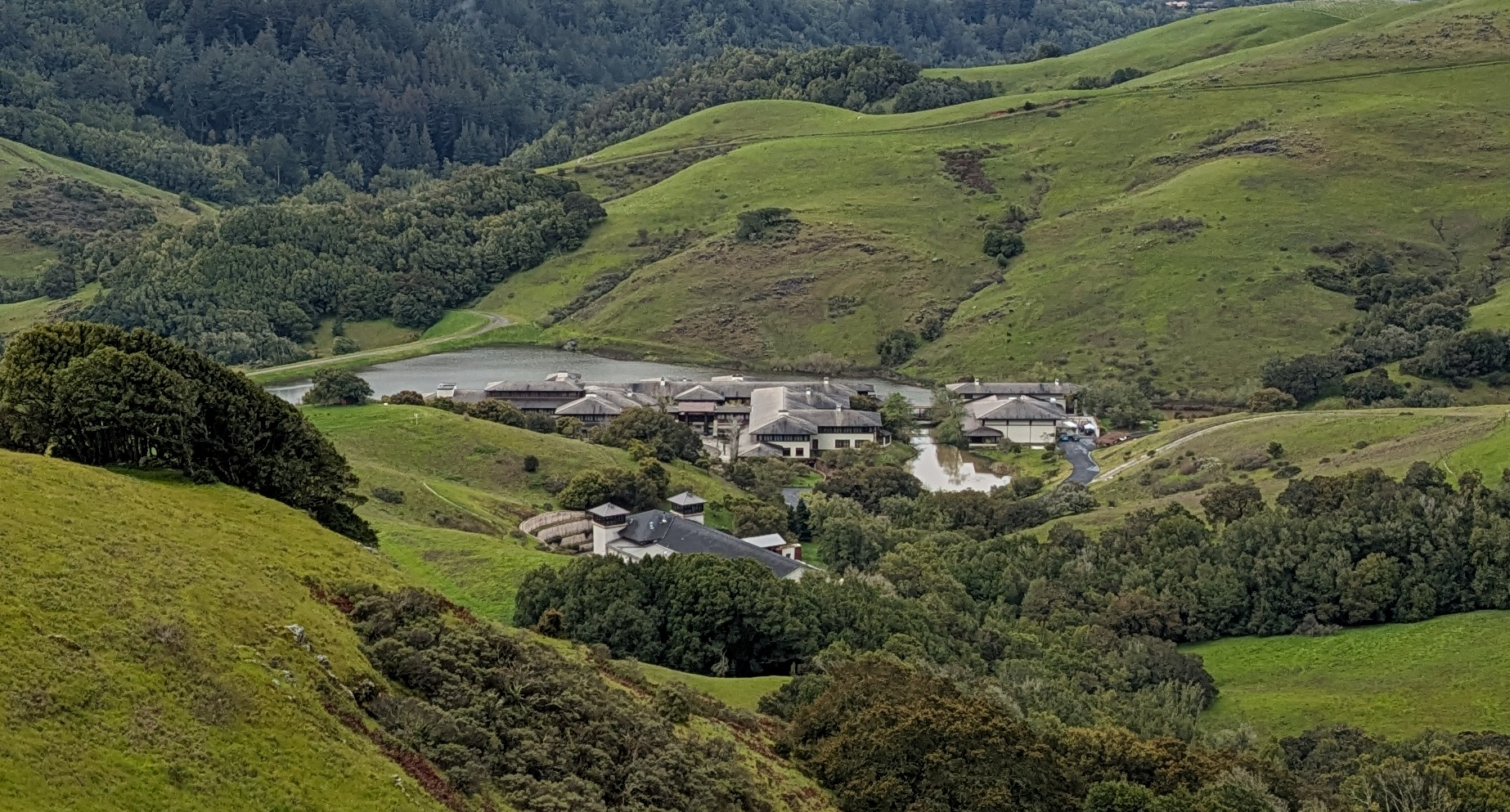
Summit Skywalker Ranch

Big Rock Ranch is a later Lucasfilm development in Marin county at 3800 Lucas Valley Road adjacent to Skywalker Ranch. The county's planning commission approved this facility in September 1996 and construction was completed in August 2002. However, in November 2004, Lucas announced that the 250 employees of the ranch were to be moved to the Letterman Digital Arts Center.

The ranch comprises 1,061 acres (429 ha), of which 43 acres (17 ha) are developed with 317,000 sq ft (29,500 m^{2}) of office space. Before the move to the Presidio in 2005, Big Rock Ranch housed the marketing, licensing, distribution and online divisions of Lucasfilm. As of 2007, it was the headquarters of the animation division. In 2018, Big Rock Ranch was renovated into an opulent, 56-room resort called "Summit Skywalker Ranch". The facility hosts exclusive corporate retreat events.

=== Others ===
Starting in 1988, Lucasfilm sought approval to develop another nearby property called Grady Ranch at 2400 Lucas Valley Road. The most recent proposals called for a 263,701-square-foot (24,498.6 m^{2}) digital film production center for the property. However, in the wake of delays caused by local resistance and environmental concerns, Lucas abandoned these plans in April 2012 and has instead decided to sell the land.

Lucas also owns McGuire Ranch (3801 Lucas Valley Road) and Loma Alta Ranch (4001 Lucas Valley Road) in Marin County.

Skywalker Ranch General Store is located at Letterman Digital Arts Center in San Francisco. Open to the public, the store sells goods from the Ranch and Lucas Vineyards, as well as Star Wars merchandise.
