= Belden =

Belden may refer to:

== Places ==
=== United States ===
- Belden, California
- Belden, Colorado
- Belden, Illinois
- Belden, Minnesota
- Belden, Mississippi
- Belden, Nebraska
- Belden, North Dakota
- Belden, Ohio

== Other uses ==
- Belden (electronics company), an American electronics company based in St. Louis, Missouri
- Belden (given name), a masculine given name
- Belden (surname), an Americanized surname
- Belden Brick Company, an American brick manufacturer
