= Death Star (disambiguation) =

The Death Star is a fictional giant military space station in the Star Wars universe, best known for its superweapon that can destroy planets.

== Star Wars related ==
- Death Star (novel), a 2007 Star Wars novel by Michael Reaves and Steve Perry
- Death Star (ILM), the render farm of Industrial Light and Magic

== Business ==
- Death Star (business), a fraudulent business strategy used by Enron to manipulate California's energy markets
- "Death Star", nickname of the AT&T Globe Symbol, the corporate logo designed by Saul Bass in 1983
- "Death Star", one of several nicknames for the Dallas Cowboys' AT&T Stadium in Arlington, Texas, U.S.
- "The Death Star", nickname for the Las Vegas Raiders' Allegiant Stadium in Paradise, Nevada, U.S.

== Science and technology ==
=== Astronomy ===
- "Death Star", an episode of NOVA that discusses gamma ray bursts; see List of NOVA episodes
- "Death Star", nickname of Nemesis (hypothetical star), a hypothetical star theorized to cause periodic extinctions on Earth
- "Death Star", nickname of Mimas (moon), a moon of Saturn which coincidentally resembles the fictional Star Wars space station
- "Death Star Galaxy", 3C321.

=== Other science and technology ===
- "Deathstar", nickname of IBM Deskstar hard drives, particularly the unreliable 75GXP and 60GXP models
- "Death Star", nickname of the target chamber of the National Ignition Facility

== Other ==
- Death Star, a fictional giant military space station in the 1965 film Attack from Space
- Deathstar (video game) a 1984 video game for the BBC Micro and Acorn Electron computers
- "Death Star", a nickname of Ghroth, one of the fictional Ramsey Campbell deities of the Cthulhu Mythos
- "Death Star", nickname of the British military base RAF Mount Pleasant in the Falkland Islands
- "Death Star", nickname of the Queen Elizabeth University Hospital

== Music ==
- Deathstars, a Swedish industrial metal band formed in 2000
- xDEATHSTARx, an American Christian hardcore band formed in 2002

=== Songs ===
- Deathstar (Sevendust song), a 2007 song by Sevendust
- "Deth Star", a song by Tenacious D

== See also ==
- Star Destroyer
