= John Forney =

John Forney may refer to:

- John Horace Forney (1829–1901), Confederate general in the American Civil War
- John Weiss Forney (1818–1881), American journalist and politician
- John Forney, former energy trader convicted of fraud, see Death Star (business)
