= Belden (surname) =

Belden is an Americanized surname, and may refer to:

- Bill Belden (1949–2025), American rower
- Bob Belden (1956–2015), American saxophonist
- Brace Belden (born 1989), American podcaster and union activist
- Bunny Belden (1900–1976), American football player
- Charles Belden (1887–1966), American photographer
- Doug Belden (1927–1972), American football player
- Eugene H. Belden (1840–1910), American politician
- Frederick H. Belden (1909–1979), Bishop of Rhode Island
- George O. Belden (1797–1833), American politician
- Henry M. Belden (1865-1954), American folklorist
- Ira Belden (1874–1916), American baseball player
- Jack Belden (1910–1989), American war correspondent
- James J. Belden (1825–1904), American politician
- Josiah Belden (1815–1892), American politician
- Thomas Belden (1731–1806), American politician
- Timothy Belden (born 1967), American criminal
- Trixie Belden, a fictional character
