= Industrial Light & Magic =

American visual effects studio

- Logo used since May 2023
- Type: Division
- Industry: Visual effects; Computer graphics; Computer animation; Stereo conversion
- Founded: May 26, 1975; 51 years ago
- Founder: George Lucas
- Headquarters: 1110 Gorgas Ave. Letterman Digital Arts Center, Presidio of San Francisco, California, 94129 United States
- Key people: Janet Lewin (General Manager and Head of ILM); Dennis Muren (Consulting Creative Director)
- Number of employees: 3,500 (2025)
- Parent: Lucasfilm
- Divisions: ILM Art; ILM Immersive; ILM StageCraft; ILM Technoprops; ILM TV
- Subsidiaries: ILM Vancouver; ILM London; ILM Sydney; ILM Mumbai; ILM Singapore (Closed)
- Website: ilm.com

Industrial Light & Magic (ILM) is an American motion picture visual effects, computer animation and stereo conversion digital studio founded by George Lucas on May 26, 1975. It is a division of the film production company Lucasfilm, which Lucas founded, and was created when he began production on the 1977 film Star Wars.

ILM originated in Van Nuys, California, then later moved to San Rafael in 1978, and since 2005 it has been based at the Letterman Digital Arts Center in the Presidio of San Francisco. In 2012, the Walt Disney Company acquired ILM as part of its purchase of Lucasfilm. As of 2026, Industrial Light & Magic has won 15 Academy Awards for Best Visual Effects.

== History ==
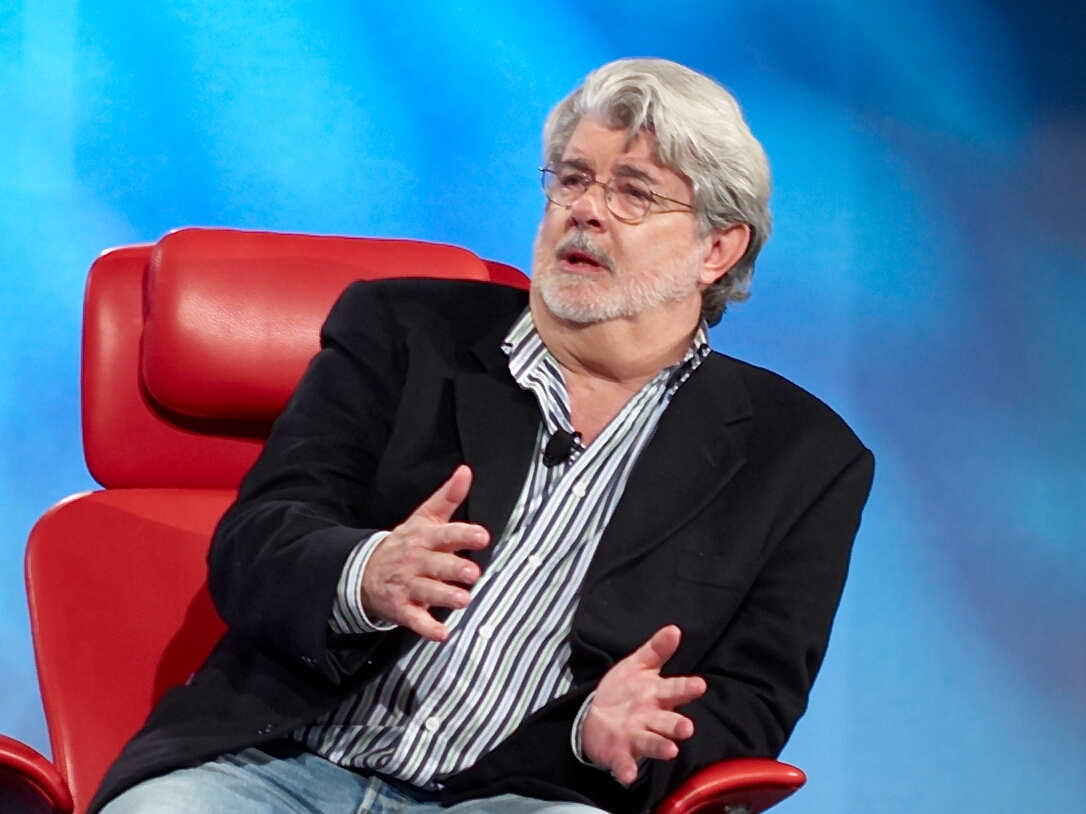
George Lucas, founder of ILM

Lucas wanted his 1977 film Star Wars to include visual effects that had never been seen on film before. After discovering that the in-house effects department at 20th Century Fox was no longer operational, Lucas approached Douglas Trumbull, best known for the effects on 2001: A Space Odyssey (1968) and Silent Running (1972). Trumbull declined, as he was already committed to working on Steven Spielberg's film Close Encounters of the Third Kind (1977), but suggested his assistant John Dykstra to Lucas. Dykstra brought together a small team of college students, artists, and engineers and set them up in a warehouse in Van Nuys, California, in 1975. After seeing the map for the location was zoned as light industrial, Lucas named the group Industrial Light and Magic, which became the Special Visual Effects department on Star Wars. Alongside Dykstra, other leading members of the original ILM team were Ken Ralston, Richard Edlund, Dennis Muren, Robert Blalack, Joe Johnston, Phil Tippett, Steve Gawley, Lorne Peterson, and Paul Huston.

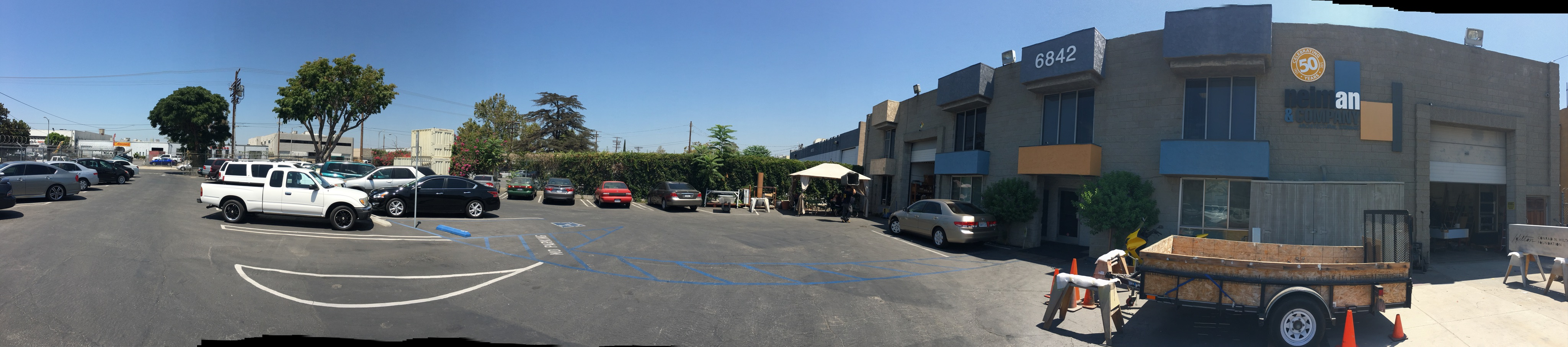
Parking lot and building of the first company headquarters of ILM in Van Nuys, where the visual effects of the first Star Wars movie were produced

In late 1978, when in pre-production for The Empire Strikes Back, Lucas reformed most of the team into Industrial Light & Magic in Marin County, California. From here on, the company expanded and has since gone on to produce special effects for over three hundred films, including the entire Star Wars saga, the Indiana Jones series, and the Jurassic Park series.

After the success of the first Star Wars movie, Lucas became interested in using computer graphics on the sequel. He contacted Triple-I, known for their early computer effects in movies like Westworld (1973), Futureworld (1976), Tron (1982), and The Last Starfighter. Triple-I made a computer-generated test of five X-wing fighters flying in formation. He found it to be too expensive and returned to handmade models. Nevertheless, the test had shown him it was possible, and he decided he would create his own computer graphics department instead. As a result, they started investing in Apple and SGI computers. One of Lucas' employees was given the task to find the right people to hire. His search would lead him to New York Institute of Technology (NYIT), where he found Edwin Catmull and his colleagues. Catmull and others accepted Lucas' job offer, and a new computer division at Lucasfilm, named The Graphics Group, was created in 1979, which technically belonged to another division than ILM, with the hiring of Ed Catmull as the first NYIT employee who joined the company. Lucas' list for them was a digital film editing system, a digital sound editing system, a laser film printer, and further exploration of computer graphics. John Lasseter, who was hired a few years later, worked on computer-animation as part of ILM's contribution to Young Sherlock Holmes. The Graphics Group was later sold to Steve Jobs, renamed Pixar Animation Studios, and created the first CGI-animated feature, Toy Story. In 2000, ILM created the OpenEXR format for high-dynamic-range imaging.

ILM operated from an inconspicuous property in San Rafael, California until 2005. The company was known to locals as the Kerner Company, a name that did not draw any attention, allowing the company to operate in secret, thus preventing the compromise of sensitive information on its productions to the media or fans. In 2005, when Lucas decided to move locations to the Presidio of San Francisco and focus on digital effects, a management-led team bought the five physical and practical effects divisions and formed a new company that included the George Lucas Theater, retained the "Kerner" name as Kerner Technologies, Inc. and provided physical effects for major motion pictures, often working with ILM, until its Chapter 7 bankruptcy in 2011.

Logo used from 2005 to 2023

In 2005, ILM extended its operations to Lucasfilm Singapore, which also includes the Singapore arm of Lucasfilm Animation. In 2006, ILM invented IMoCap (Image Based Motion Capture Technology). By 2007, ILM was one of the largest visual effects vendors in the motion picture industry and had one of the largest render farms (named Death Star). In 2011, it was announced the company was considering a project-based facility in Vancouver. ILM first opened a temporary facility in Vancouver, relocating in 2014 to a 30,000-square-foot studio on Water Street in the Gastown district, and again in 2025 to a 40,000-square-foot studio at The Stack office tower in the Coal Harbour area.

In October 2012, Disney bought ILM's parent company, Lucasfilm, acquiring ILM, Skywalker Sound, and LucasArts in the process. Disney stated that it had no immediate plans to change ILM's operations, but began to lay off employees by April of the next year. Following the restructuring of LucasArts in April 2013, ILM was left overstaffed and the faculty was reduced to serve only ILM's visual effects department. ILM opened a London studio headquartered in the city's Soho district on October 15, 2014.

On November 7, 2018, ILM opened a new division targeted at television series called ILM TV, to be based in ILM's 47,000-square-foot London studio, with support from the company's locations in San Francisco, Vancouver and Singapore. In July 2019, ILM announced the opening of a new facility in Sydney, Australia. In the same year, ILM introduced StageCraft. Also known as "The Volume", it uses high-definition LED video walls to generate virtual sceneries and was first used in The Mandalorian. Following Disney's acquisition of 21st Century Fox, Fox VFX Lab was folded into ILM, including the Technoprops division. In October 2022, ILM opened a new studio in Mumbai. In May 2023, ILMxLAB was rebranded as ILM Immersive.

In August 2023, Lucasfilm announced it would close the ILM studio in Singapore due to economic factors affecting the industry and the 2023 Hollywood labor disputes. The closure affected 340 Singapore-based jobs. Employees continued working until the end of the year. Disney confirmed that it would be helping employees to either find work with local companies with similar skills requirements or relocate to ILM's other studios in London, Vancouver, Sydney and Mumbai. An ILM Singapore employee confirmed that the closure of the Singaporean studio was linked to the strike.

== Milestones ==
In 2025, Rob Bredow released ILM's first AI-generated video, titled Star Wars Field Guide.

- 1975: ILM used VistaVision for Star Wars: Episode IV - A New Hope
- 1980: ILM's first use of Go motion was used to animate the Tauntaun creatures and AT-ATs of Star Wars: Episode V - The Empire Strikes Back
- 1982: ILM's first in-house completely computer-generated sequence was the "Genesis sequence" in Star Trek II: The Wrath of Khan. (Former computer graphics in Star Wars - Episode IV: A New Hope were done outside of ILM.)
- 1985: ILM's first completely computer-generated character, the "stained glass man", featured in Young Sherlock Holmes
- 1988: ILM did their first morphing sequence in Willow
- 1989: The first digital compositing of a full-screen live-action image was done by ILM during the final sequence in Indiana Jones and the Last Crusade
- 1989: ILM created their first computer-generated 3-D character to show emotion, the pseudopod creature in The Abyss
- 1991: ILM created their first dimensional matte painting – where a traditional matte painting was mapped onto 3-D geometry, allowing for camera parallax, in Hook.
- 1991: ILM created their first computer-generated main character, the T-1000 in Terminator 2: Judgment Day
- 1992: ILM generated the texture of human skin for the first time in Death Becomes Her
- 1993: The first time digital technology was used to create complete and detailed living creatures, the dinosaurs in Jurassic Park, earned ILM its thirteenth Oscar
- 1994: The first extensive use of digital manipulation of historical and stock footage was done to integrate characters in Forrest Gump.
- 1995: ILM created their first fully synthetic speaking computer-generated character, with a distinct personality and emotion, to take a leading role in Casper
- 1995: ILM created their first computer-generated photo-realistic hair and fur (used for the digital lion and monkeys) in Jumanji
- 1996: ILM's first completely computer-generated main character, Draco, was featured in Dragonheart
- 1999: ILM's first computer-generated character to have a full human anatomy, Imhotep, was featured in The Mummy
- 1999: ILM's first fully computer-generated character in a live-action film using motion-capture, Jar Jar Binks, was featured in Star Wars: Episode I - The Phantom Menace
- 2000: ILM created the OpenEXR imaging format.
- 2006: ILM developed the iMocap system, which uses computer vision techniques to track live-action performers on set. It was used in the creation of Davy Jones and ship's crew in the film Pirates of the Caribbean: Dead Man's Chest
- 2011: The first animated feature produced by ILM, Rango, was released.
- 2019: ILM used real-time rendering (with Unreal Engine) and digital LED displays as a virtual set (known as StageCraft or The Volume) for the first time in The Mandalorian
- 2025: Rob Bredow unveiled Star Wars test footage using a text-to-video model to generate fictional creatures. This was ILM's first implementation of generative artificial intelligence. The video received widespread negative reactions, both for the usage of AI and for the quality of the work.

== Notable employees and clients ==
Photoshop originated at ILM as an image-processing program. ILM visual effects supervisor John Knoll and his brother Thomas created it as a summer project, and it was used on The Abyss. The Knoll brothers sold the program to Adobe in 1989. Thomas Knoll continues to work on Photoshop at Adobe and is featured in the billing on its splash screen, while John Knoll remains ILM's top visual effects supervisor and was one of the executive producers and writers of Rogue One: A Star Wars Story.

In addition to its work for George Lucas, ILM collaborates with Steven Spielberg on many films that he directs and produces. Dennis Muren has acted as Computer Animation Supervisor on many of these films, although he had no personal experience as an animator. For Jurassic Park in 1993, ILM used a program called Viewpaint, which allowed visual effects artists to paint color and texture directly onto the surface of the computer models. Former ILM CG animator Steve "Spaz" Williams, who was personally responsible for building and animating the first digital dinosaur (a Tyrannosaurus) ever put to film, said that the shots involving computer-generated dinosaurs took nearly a year to complete.

Jurassic Park is noted for its groundbreaking use of computer-generated imagery and is regarded as a landmark for visual effects. The company also works on more subtle special effects, such as widening streets, digitally adding more extras to a shot, and inserting actors into preexisting footage, as in Forrest Gump in 1994.

ILM's clients extend beyond feature films. American rock band KISS worked with ILM to create their digital avatars, which debuted on December 2, 2023. ILM is also famous for its commercial work, with clients including Energizer and Oldsmobile. The company also animated Yoda for a series of 2012 commercials for Vodafone, which were broadcast in the UK.

Several well-known figures have also worked at ILM. Adam Savage, Grant Imahara and Tory Belleci of MythBusters fame all worked there. Actor Masi Oka worked as a programmer on several major ILM productions, including Revenge of the Sith, before joining the cast of the NBC show Heroes as Hiro Nakamura. Several film directors also have ILM backgrounds: David Fincher worked at ILM for four years in the early 1980s; Joe Johnston was a visual effects artist and art director; and Mark A.Z. Dippé, a visual effects supervisor, directed Spawn (1997).

On the executive side, sound editor and film producer James "Jim" Nelson served as an associate producer of the original Star Wars and helped build ILM alongside George Lucas, overseeing the company's administration and management. Lucasfilm co-president Lynwen Brennan joined ILM in 1999 and became its president in 2009.

== Live-action films ==
=== 1970s–1980s ===
Year	Films	Director(s)	Studio(s) and Distributor(s)	Budget	Gross
1977	Star Wars (Note: Academy Award winner for Best Visual Effects) (Star Wars: Episode IV - A New Hope)	George Lucas	20th Century Fox; Lucasfilm	$11 million	$775.5 million
1980	The Empire Strikes Back (Star Wars: Episode V - The Empire Strikes Back)	Irvin Kershner	20th Century Fox; Lucasfilm	$33 million	$547.9 million
1981	Raiders of the Lost Ark (Indiana Jones and the Raiders of the Lost Ark)	Steven Spielberg	Paramount Pictures; Lucasfilm	$18 million	$389.9 million
1981	Dragonslayer	Matthew Robbins	Paramount Pictures; Walt Disney Pictures	$18 million	$14 million
1982	Star Trek II: The Wrath of Khan	Nicholas Meyer	Paramount Pictures	$11.2 million	$97 million
1982	E.T.: The Extra-Terrestrial (also 20th Anniversary re-issue in 2002)	Steven Spielberg	Universal Pictures; Amblin Entertainment	$10 million	$792.9 million
1982	The Dark Crystal	Jim Henson and Frank Oz	Universal Pictures	$15 million	$40 million
1982	Poltergeist	Tobe Hooper	Metro-Goldwyn-Mayer	$10.7 million	$121.7 million
1983	Return of the Jedi (Star Wars: Episode VI - Return of the Jedi)	Richard Marquand	20th Century Fox; Lucasfilm	$42.7 million	$480 million
1984	Indiana Jones and the Temple of Doom	Steven Spielberg	Paramount Pictures; Lucasfilm	$28.2 million	$333.1 million
1984	Star Trek III: The Search for Spock	Leonard Nimoy	Paramount Pictures	$16 million	$87 million
1984	The NeverEnding Story	Wolfgang Petersen	Warner Bros. Pictures	$27 million	$100 million
1984	Starman	John Carpenter	Columbia Pictures	$24 million	$28.7 million
1985	The Goonies	Richard Donner	Warner Bros. Pictures	$19 million	$61.5 million
1985	Cocoon	Ron Howard	20th Century Fox	$17.5 million	$85.3 million
1985	Back to the Future	Robert Zemeckis	Universal Pictures	$19 million	$389.1 million
1985	Explorers	Joe Dante	Paramount Pictures	$25 million	$9.9 million
1985	Young Sherlock Holmes	Barry Levinson	Paramount Pictures	$18 million	$19 million
1985	Enemy Mine	Wolfgang Petersen	20th Century Fox	$29 million	$12 million
1986	The Money Pit	Richard Benjamin	Universal Pictures	$18.4 million	$55 million
1986	Labyrinth	Jim Henson	TriStar Pictures; Lucasfilm	$27.68 million	$11.6 million
1986	Howard the Duck	Willard Huyck	Universal Pictures; Lucasfilm	$37 million	$38 million
1986	Star Trek IV: The Voyage Home	Leonard Nimoy	Paramount Pictures	$21 million	$133 million
1986	The Golden Child	Michael Ritchie	Paramount Pictures	$25 million	$79.8 million
1987	Harry and the Hendersons	William Dear	Universal Pictures	$16 million	$49 million
1987	The Witches of Eastwick	George Miller	Warner Bros. Pictures	$22 million	$63.8 million
1987	Innerspace	Joe Dante	Warner Bros. Pictures	$27 million	$25 million
1987	Empire of the Sun	Steven Spielberg	Warner Bros. Pictures	$35 million	$22.2 million
1987	Batteries Not Included	Matthew Robbins	Universal Pictures	$25 million	$65.1 million
1987	Spaceballs	Mel Brooks	Metro-Goldwyn-Mayer	$22.7 million	$40.3 million
1988	Willow	Ron Howard	Metro-Goldwyn-Mayer; Lucasfilm	$35 million	$57.3 million
1988	Who Framed Roger Rabbit	Robert Zemeckis	Touchstone Pictures	$58 million	$329.8 million
1988	Caddyshack II	Allan Arkush	Warner Bros. Pictures	$20 million	$11.8 million
1988	Tucker: The Man and His Dream	Francis Ford Coppola	Paramount Pictures	$22-24 million	$19.7 million
1988	The Last Temptation of Christ	Martin Scorsese	Universal Pictures	$7 million	$8.4 million
1988	Cocoon: The Return	Daniel Petrie	20th Century Fox	$17.5 million	$25 million
1989	The 'Burbs	Joe Dante	Universal Pictures	$18 million	$49 million
1989	Skin Deep	Blake Edwards	20th Century Fox	$9 million	$19 million
1989	Field of Dreams	Phil Alden Robinson	Universal Pictures; Carolco Pictures	$15 million	$84.4 million
1989	Indiana Jones and the Last Crusade	Steven Spielberg	Paramount Pictures; Lucasfilm	$48 million	$474.2 million
1989	Ghostbusters II	Ivan Reitman	Columbia Pictures	$37 million	$215.4 million
1989	The Abyss	James Cameron	20th Century Fox	$70 million	$90 million
1989	Back to the Future Part II	Robert Zemeckis	Universal Pictures	$40 million	$332 million
1989	Always	Steven Spielberg	Universal Pictures	$31 million	$74 million

=== 1990s ===
Year	Films	Director(s)	Studio(s) and Distributor(s)	Budget	Gross
1990	The Hunt for Red October	John McTiernan	Paramount Pictures	$30 million	$200.5 million
1990	Joe Versus the Volcano	John Patrick Shanley	Warner Bros. Pictures	$25 million	$39 million
1990	Back to the Future Part III	Robert Zemeckis	Universal Pictures	$40 million	$244.5 million
1990	Total Recall	Paul Verhoeven	TriStar Pictures	$50 million	$300 million
1990	Die Hard 2	Renny Harlin	20th Century Fox	$70 million	$240 million
1990	Ghost	Jerry Zucker	Paramount Pictures	$22 million	$505.7 million
1990	Arachnophobia	Frank Marshall	Hollywood Pictures	$31 million	$53.2 million
1990	Dreams	Akira Kurosawa	Warner Bros. Pictures	$12 million	$2 million
1990	The Godfather Part III	Francis Ford Coppola	Paramount Pictures	$54 million	$136.8 million
1991	Flight of the Intruder	John Milius	Paramount Pictures	$35 million	$14 million
1991	The Doors	Oliver Stone	TriStar Pictures	$38 million	$34.4 million
1991	Switch	Blake Edwards	Warner Bros. Pictures	$15 million	$15.5 million
1991	Backdraft	Ron Howard	Universal Pictures	$75 million	$152.3 million
1991	Hudson Hawk	Michael Lehmann	TriStar Pictures	$65 million	$17.2 million
1991	The Rocketeer	Joe Johnston	Walt Disney Pictures; Touchstone Pictures	$40 million	$46.7 million
1991	Terminator 2: Judgment Day	James Cameron	TriStar Pictures; Lightstorm Entertainment; Carolco Pictures; Pacific Western Productions	$94 million	$519.8 million
1991	Hook	Steven Spielberg	TriStar Pictures; Amblin Entertainment	$70 million	$300.9 million
1991	Star Trek VI: The Undiscovered Country	Nicholas Meyer	Paramount Pictures	$27 million	$96.9 million
1992	Memoirs of an Invisible Man	John Carpenter	Warner Bros. Pictures	$40 million	$14.4 million
1992	Death Becomes Her	Robert Zemeckis	Universal Pictures	$55 million	$149 million
1993	Alive	Frank Marshall	Touchstone Pictures; Paramount Pictures	$32 million	$36.7 million
1993	Fire in the Sky	Robert Lieberman	Paramount Pictures	$15 million	$19.9 million
1993	Jurassic Park	Steven Spielberg	Universal Pictures; Amblin Entertainment	$63 million	$1.104 billion
1993	Last Action Hero	John McTiernan	Columbia Pictures	$85 million	$137.3 million
1993	Manhattan Murder Mystery	Woody Allen	TriStar Pictures	$13.5 million	$11.2 million
1993	Rising Sun	Philip Kaufman	20th Century Fox	$35 million	$107.2 million
1993	The Meteor Man	Robert Townsend	Metro-Goldwyn-Mayer	$30 million	$8 million
1993	Malice	Harold Becker	Columbia Pictures; New Line Cinema	$20 million	$46 million
1993	The Nutcracker	Emile Ardolino	Warner Bros. Pictures	$19 million	$2 million
1993	Schindler's List	Steven Spielberg	Universal Pictures	$22 million	$322.1 million
1994	The Hudsucker Proxy	Joel and Ethan Coen	Warner Bros. Pictures; Universal Pictures	$25 million	$2.8 million
1994	Forrest Gump	Robert Zemeckis	Paramount Pictures	$55 million	$677.9 million
1994	Maverick	Richard Donner	Warner Bros. Pictures	$75 million	$183 million
1994	The Flintstones	Brian Levant	Universal Pictures	$46 million	$341.6 million
1994	Wolf	Mike Nichols	Columbia Pictures	$70 million	$131 million
1994	Baby's Day Out	Patrick Read Johnson	20th Century Fox	$48 million	$16.8 million
1994	The Mask	Chuck Russell	New Line Cinema	$23 million	$351.6 million
1994	Radioland Murders	Mel Smith	Universal Pictures; Lucasfilm	$15 million	$1.3 million
1994	Disclosure	Barry Levinson	Warner Bros. Pictures	$55 million	$214 million
1994	Star Trek Generations	David Carson	Paramount Pictures	$35 million	$118 million
1994	In the Mouth of Madness	John Carpenter	New Line Cinema	$8 million	$8.9 million
1995	Village of the Damned	John Carpenter	Universal Pictures	$22 million	$9.4 million
1995	Casper	Brad Silberling	Universal Pictures	$55 million	$287.9 million
1995	Congo	Frank Marshall	Paramount Pictures	$50 million	$152 million
1995	The Indian in the Cupboard	Frank Oz	Paramount Pictures; Columbia Pictures	$45 million	$35 million
1995	The American President	Rob Reiner	Columbia Pictures; Universal Pictures	$62 million	$107 million
1995	Jumanji	Joe Johnston	TriStar Pictures	$65 million	$262.8 million
1995	Sabrina	Sydney Pollack	Paramount Pictures	$50 million	$53 million
1996	Twister	Jan de Bont	Warner Bros. Pictures; Universal Pictures	$88–92 million	$499.2 million
1996	Mission: Impossible	Brian De Palma	Paramount Pictures	$80 million	$457.7 million
1996	DragonHeart	Rob Cohen	Universal Pictures	$57 million	$115 million
1996	Eraser	Chuck Russell	Warner Bros. Pictures	$100 million	$242.3 million
1996	The Trigger Effect	David Koepp	Gramercy Pictures	$8 million	$3 million
1996	Sleepers	Barry Levinson	Warner Bros. Pictures; Universal Pictures	$44 million	$165.6 million
1996	Star Trek: First Contact	Jonathan Frakes	Paramount Pictures	$45 million	$146 million
1996	101 Dalmatians	Stephen Herek	Walt Disney Pictures	$75 million	$320.6 million
1996	Daylight	Rob Cohen	Universal Pictures	$80 million	$159.2 million
1996	Mars Attacks!	Tim Burton	Warner Bros. Pictures	$70 million	$101.3 million
1997	The Lost World: Jurassic Park	Steven Spielberg	Universal Pictures; Amblin Entertainment	$73–75 million	$618.6 million
1997	Speed 2: Cruise Control	Jan de Bont	20th Century Fox	$110 million	$164.5 million
1997	Men in Black	Barry Sonnenfeld	Columbia Pictures	$90 million	$589.4 million
1997	Contact	Robert Zemeckis	Warner Bros. Pictures	$90 million	$171.1 million
1997	Spawn	Mark A.Z. Dippé	New Line Cinema	$40 million	$87.8 million
1997	Starship Troopers	Paul Verhoeven	TriStar Pictures; Touchstone Pictures	$105 million	$121.2 million
1997	Midnight in the Garden of Good and Evil	Clint Eastwood	Warner Bros. Pictures	$30 million	$25.1 million
1997	Flubber	Les Mayfield	Walt Disney Pictures	$80 million	$177.9 million
1997	Amistad	Steven Spielberg	DreamWorks Pictures	$36 million	$44.2 million
1997	Deconstructing Harry	Woody Allen	Fine Line Features	$20 million	$10 million
1997	Titanic	James Cameron	Paramount Pictures; 20th Century Fox; Lightstorm Entertainment	$200 million	$2.264 billion
1998	Deep Rising	Stephen Sommers	Hollywood Pictures	$45 million	$11.2 million
1998	Mercury Rising	Harold Becker	Universal Pictures	$60 million	$93 million
1998	Deep Impact	Mimi Leder	Paramount Pictures; DreamWorks Pictures	$80 million	$349.4 million
1998	Small Soldiers	Joe Dante	DreamWorks Pictures; Universal Pictures	$40 million	$54.7 million
1998	Saving Private Ryan	Steven Spielberg	DreamWorks Pictures; Paramount Pictures	$70 million	$481.8 million
1998	Snake Eyes	Brian De Palma	Paramount Pictures; Touchstone Pictures	$73 million	$103.8 million
1998	Reach the Rock	William Ryan	Gramercy Pictures; Universal Pictures	TBC	$4,960
1998	Meet Joe Black	Martin Brest	Universal Pictures	$90 million	$142 million
1998	Celebrity	Woody Allen	Miramax Films	$12 million	$5 million
1998	Jack Frost	Troy Miller	Warner Bros. Pictures	$85 million	$34.6 million
1998	Mighty Joe Young	Ron Underwood	Walt Disney Pictures	$90 million	$50 million
1999	October Sky	Joe Johnston	Universal Pictures	$25 million	$34.7 million
1999	The Mummy	Stephen Sommers	Universal Pictures	$80 million	$415.9 million
1999	Star Wars: Episode I - The Phantom Menace	George Lucas	20th Century Fox; Lucasfilm	$115 million	$1.027 billion
1999	Wild Wild West	Barry Sonnenfeld	Warner Bros. Pictures	$170 million	$222.1 million
1999	The Haunting	Jan de Bont	DreamWorks Pictures	$80 million	$177.3 million
1999	Deep Blue Sea	Renny Harlin	Warner Bros. Pictures	$60 million	$164.6 million
1999	Bringing Out the Dead	Martin Scorsese	Paramount Pictures; Touchstone Pictures	$55 million	$16.8 million
1999	Sleepy Hollow	Tim Burton	Paramount Pictures	$100 million	$206 million
1999	The Green Mile	Frank Darabont	Warner Bros. Pictures	$60 million	$290.7 million
1999	Magnolia	Paul Thomas Anderson	New Line Cinema	$37 million	$48.5 million
1999	Snow Falling on Cedars	Scott Hicks	Universal Pictures	$35 million	$23 million
1999	Galaxy Quest	Dean Parisot	DreamWorks Pictures	$45 million	$90.7 million
1999	Sweet and Lowdown	Woody Allen	Sony Pictures Classics	$29.7 million	$4 million

=== 2000s ===
Year	Films	Director(s)	Studio(s) and Distributor(s)	Budget	Gross
2000	Mission to Mars	Brian De Palma	Touchstone Pictures	$100 million	$110.9 million
2000	The Perfect Storm	Wolfgang Petersen	Warner Bros. Pictures	$120 million	$328.7 million
2000	The Adventures of Rocky and Bullwinkle	Des McAnuff	Universal Pictures	$76 million	$35 million
2000	Space Cowboys	Clint Eastwood	Warner Bros. Pictures	$60 million	$128.9 million
2000	Pollock	Ed Harris	Sony Pictures Classics	$6 million	$10 million
2000	Pay It Forward	Mimi Leder	Warner Bros. Pictures	$40 million	$55 million
2001	The Pledge	Sean Penn	Warner Bros. Pictures	$35 million	$29.4 million
2001	Sweet November	Pat O'Connor	Warner Bros. Pictures	$40 million	$65 million
2001	The Mummy Returns	Stephen Sommers	Universal Pictures	$98 million	$433 million
2001	Pearl Harbor	Michael Bay	Touchstone Pictures; Jerry Bruckheimer Films	$140 million	$449.2 million
2001	A.I. Artificial Intelligence	Steven Spielberg	Warner Bros. Pictures; DreamWorks Pictures	$100 million	$235.9 million
2001	Jurassic Park III	Joe Johnston	Universal Pictures; Amblin Entertainment	$93 million	$368.8 million
2001	Planet of the Apes	Tim Burton	20th Century Fox	$100 million	$362.2 million
2001	Harry Potter and the Philosopher's Stone	Chris Columbus	Warner Bros. Pictures	$125 million	$1.024 billion
2001	The Majestic	Frank Darabont	Warner Bros. Pictures	$72 million	$37.3 million
2001	Imposter	Gary Fleder	Dimension Films	$40 million	$8 million
2002	The Time Machine	Simon Wells	DreamWorks Pictures; Warner Bros. Pictures	$80 million	$123.7 million
2002	Big Trouble	Barry Sonnenfeld	Touchstone Pictures	$40 million	$8.5 million
2002	Star Wars: Episode II - Attack of the Clones	George Lucas	20th Century Fox; Lucasfilm	$115 million	$649.4 million
2002	The Bourne Identity	Doug Liman	Universal Pictures	$60 million	$214 million
2002	Minority Report	Steven Spielberg	DreamWorks Pictures; 20th Century Fox	$102 million	$358.4 million
2002	Men in Black II	Barry Sonnenfeld	Columbia Pictures	$140 million	$441.8 million
2002	K-19: The Widowmaker	Kathryn Bigelow	Paramount Pictures	$100 million	$65.7 million
2002	Signs	M. Night Shyamalan	Touchstone Pictures	$72 million	$408.2 million
2002	Blood Work	Clint Eastwood	Warner Bros. Pictures	$50 million	$31 million
2002	Punch-Drunk Love	Paul Thomas Anderson	Columbia Pictures; New Line Cinema	$25 million	$24.7 million
2002	Harry Potter and the Chamber of Secrets	Chris Columbus	Warner Bros. Pictures	$100 million	$879 million
2002	Gangs of New York	Martin Scorsese	Miramax Films; Touchstone Pictures	$97 million	$193.8 million
2003	Tears of the Sun	Antoine Fuqua	Columbia Pictures	$100.5 million	$86.5 million
2003	The Hunted	William Friedkin	Paramount Pictures	$55 million	$45 million
2003	Dreamcatcher	Lawrence Kasdan	Warner Bros. Pictures	$68 million	$75.7 million
2003	Hulk	Ang Lee	Universal Pictures	$137 million	$245.4 million
2003	Terminator 3: Rise of the Machines	Jonathan Mostow	Warner Bros. Pictures; Columbia Pictures	$187 million	$433.4 million
2003	Pirates of the Caribbean: The Curse of the Black Pearl	Gore Verbinski	Walt Disney Pictures; Jerry Bruckheimer Films	$140 million	$654.3 million
2003	The League of Extraordinary Gentlemen	Stephen Norrington	20th Century Fox	$78 million	$179.3 million
2003	Once Upon a Time in Mexico	Robert Rodriguez	Columbia Pictures; Dimension Films	$28 million	$98.1 million
2003	Master and Commander: The Far Side of the World	Peter Weir	20th Century Fox; Universal Pictures	$150 million	$212 million
2003	Timeline	Richard Donner	Paramount Pictures	$80 million	$34 million
2003	Stuck on You	Peter and Robert Farrelly	20th Century Fox	$55 million	$65 million
2003	Peter Pan	P. J. Hogan	Universal Pictures; Columbia Pictures	$130 million	$122 million
2004	Along Came Polly	John Hamburg	Universal Pictures	$42 million	$171 million
2004	Twisted	Philip Kaufman	Paramount Pictures	$50 million	$41 million
2004	Hidalgo	Joe Johnston	Touchstone Pictures	$40 million	$108.1 million
2004	Van Helsing	Stephen Sommers	Universal Pictures	$160 million	$300.3 million
2004	The Day After Tomorrow	Roland Emmerich	20th Century Fox	$125 million	$544.3 million
2004	Harry Potter and the Prisoner of Azkaban	Alfonso Cuarón	Warner Bros. Pictures	$130 million	$796.7 million
2004	The Chronicles of Riddick	David Twohy	Universal Pictures	$105 million	$115.8 million
2004	The Bourne Supremacy	Paul Greengrass	Universal Pictures	$75 million	$288.5 million
2004	The Village	M. Night Shyamalan	Touchstone Pictures	$60 million	$256.7 million
2004	Sky Captain and the World of Tomorrow	Kerry Conran	Paramount Pictures	$70 million	$58 million
2004	Lemony Snicket's A Series of Unfortunate Events	Brad Silberling	Paramount Pictures; DreamWorks Pictures	$140 million	$209.1 million
2004	Eros	Wong Kar-wai; Steven Soderbergh; Michelangelo Antonioni	Warner Independent Pictures; Artificial Eye	TBC	$1 million
2005	Are We There Yet?	Brian Levant	Columbia Pictures	$32 million	$97 million
2005	Son of the Mask	Lawrence Guterman	New Line Cinema	$84 million	$57.6 million
2005	The Pacifier	Adam Shankman	Walt Disney Pictures	$56 million	$198.6 million
2005	The Amityville Horror	Andrew Douglas	Metro-Goldwyn-Mayer; Dimension Films	$19 million	$108 million
2005	xXx: State of the Union	Lee Tamahori	Columbia Pictures	$87–113 million	$71 million
2005	Star Wars: Episode III - Revenge of the Sith	George Lucas	20th Century Fox; Lucasfilm	$113 million	$848.8 million
2005	The Adventures of Sharkboy and Lavagirl in 3-D	Robert Rodriguez	Dimension Films; Columbia Pictures	$50 million	$69.4 million
2005	Herbie: Fully Loaded	Angela Robinson	Walt Disney Pictures	$50 million	$144.1 million
2005	War of the Worlds	Steven Spielberg	Paramount Pictures; DreamWorks Pictures	$132 million	$591.7 million
2005	The Island	Michael Bay	DreamWorks Pictures; Warner Bros. Pictures	$126 million	$162.9 million
2005	Jarhead	Sam Mendes	Universal Pictures	$72 million	$96.9 million
2005	Rent	Chris Columbus	Columbia Pictures	$40 million	$31.6 million
2005	Harry Potter and the Goblet of Fire	Mike Newell	Warner Bros. Pictures	$150 million	$896.9 million
2005	The Chronicles of Narnia: The Lion, the Witch and the Wardrobe	Andrew Adamson	Walt Disney Pictures	$180 million	$745 million
2005	Munich	Steven Spielberg	Universal Pictures; DreamWorks Pictures	$70 million	$130.4 million
2005	Cheaper by the Dozen 2	Adam Shankman	20th Century Fox	$60 million	$129.1 million
2006	Eight Below	Frank Marshall	Walt Disney Pictures	$40 million	$120.4 million
2006	Mission: Impossible III	J. J. Abrams	Paramount Pictures	$150 million	$397.9 million
2006	Poseidon	Wolfgang Petersen	Warner Bros. Pictures	$160 million	$181.7 million
2006	The Fast and the Furious: Tokyo Drift	Justin Lin	Universal Pictures	$85 million	$159 million
2006	Pirates of the Caribbean: Dead Man's Chest	Gore Verbinski	Walt Disney Pictures; Jerry Bruckheimer Films	$225 million	$1.066 billion
2006	Lady in the Water	M. Night Shyamalan	Warner Bros. Pictures	$70 million	$72.8 million
2006	Eragon	Stefen Fangmeier	20th Century Fox	$100 million	$249.5 million
2007	Pirates of the Caribbean: At World's End'	Gore Verbinski	Walt Disney Pictures; Jerry Bruckheimer Films	$300 million	$963.4 million
2007	Evan Almighty	Tom Shadyac	Universal Pictures	$175 million	$173.4 million
2007	Transformers	Michael Bay	DreamWorks Pictures; Paramount Pictures	$150 million	$709.7 million
2007	Harry Potter and the Order of the Phoenix	David Yates	Warner Bros. Pictures	$150 million	$939.9 million
2007	Rush Hour 3	Brett Ratner	New Line Cinema	$140 million	$258 million
2007	Lions for Lambs	Robert Redford	Metro-Goldwyn-Mayer; 20th Century Fox	$35 million	$63.2 million
2007	National Treasure: Book of Secrets	Jon Turteltaub	Walt Disney Pictures; Jerry Bruckheimer Films	$130 million	$457.4 million
2007	There Will Be Blood	Paul Thomas Anderson	Paramount Vantage; Miramax Films	$25 million	$76.2 million
2008	The Spiderwick Chronicles	Mark Waters	Paramount Pictures	$90 million	$162 million
2008	Iron Man	Jon Favreau	Paramount Pictures; Marvel Studios	$140 million	$585.2 million
2008	Speed Racer	The Wachowskis	Warner Bros. Pictures	$120 million	$93.9 million
2008	Indiana Jones and the Kingdom of the Crystal Skull	Steven Spielberg	Paramount Pictures; Lucasfilm	$185 million	$786.6 million
2008	The Happening	M. Night Shyamalan	20th Century Fox	$48 million	$163.4 million
2008	Miracle at St. Anna	Spike Lee	Touchstone Pictures	$45 million	$9.3 million
2008	Twilight	Catherine Hardwicke	Summit Entertainment	$37 million	$408.4 million
2009	Confessions of a Shopaholic	P. J. Hogan	Touchstone Pictures	$55 million	$108.3 million
2009	Star Trek	J. J. Abrams	Paramount Pictures; Bad Robot	$150 million	$385.7 million
2009	Terminator Salvation	McG	Warner Bros. Pictures; Columbia Pictures	$200 million	$371.4 million
2009	Transformers: Revenge of the Fallen	Michael Bay	DreamWorks Pictures; Paramount Pictures	$200 million	$836.3 million
2009	Harry Potter and the Half-Blood Prince	David Yates	Warner Bros. Pictures	$250 million	$934.4 million
2009	Avatar	James Cameron	20th Century Fox; Lightstorm Entertainment	$237 million	$2.924 billion

=== 2010s ===
Year	Films	Director(s)	Studio(s) and Distributor(s)	Budget	Gross
2010	Iron Man 2	Jon Favreau	Paramount Pictures; Marvel Studios	$200 million	$623.9 million
2010	The Last Airbender	M. Night Shyamalan	Paramount Pictures	$150 million	$319.7 million
2011	I Am Number Four	D. J. Caruso	DreamWorks Pictures; Touchstone Pictures	$50 million	$149.9 million
2011	Pirates of the Caribbean: On Stranger Tides	Rob Marshall	Walt Disney Pictures; Jerry Bruckheimer Films	$378.5 million	$1.046 billion
2011	Super 8	J. J. Abrams	Paramount Pictures	$50 million	$260.1 million
2011	Transformers: Dark of the Moon	Michael Bay	Paramount Pictures	$195 million	$1.124 billion
2011	Cowboys & Aliens	Jon Favreau	Universal Pictures; DreamWorks Pictures; Paramount Pictures	$163 million	$174 million
2011	Hugo	Martin Scorsese	Paramount Pictures	$150 million	$185.8 million
2011	Mission: Impossible - Ghost Protocol	Brad Bird	Paramount Pictures; Skydance Productions; Bad Robot	$145 million	$694.7 million
2012	Red Tails	Anthony Hemingway	20th Century Fox; Lucasfilm	$58 million	$50.4 million
2012	The Avengers	Joss Whedon	Marvel Studios	$220 million	$1.520 billion
2012	Battleship	Peter Berg	Universal Pictures; Hasbro	$220 million	$303 million
2012	Cloud Atlas	The Wachowskis and Tom Tykwer	Warner Bros. Pictures	$128.5 million	$130.5 million
2013	Identity Thief	Seth Gordon	Universal Pictures	$35 million	$174 million
2013	G.I. Joe: Retaliation	Jon M. Chu	Paramount Pictures	$130 million	$375.7 million
2013	Pain & Gain	Michael Bay	Paramount Pictures	$26 million	$86.2 million
2013	The Great Gatsby	Baz Luhrmann	Warner Bros. Pictures	$105 million	$351 million
2013	Now You See Me	Louis Leterrier	Lionsgate	$75 million	$351.7 million
2013	Star Trek Into Darkness	J. J. Abrams	Paramount Pictures; Skydance Productions; Bad Robot	$185 million	$467.4 million
2013	World War Z	Marc Forster	Paramount Pictures; Skydance Productions	$190 million	$540 million
2013	The Lone Ranger	Gore Verbinski	Walt Disney Pictures; Jerry Bruckheimer Films	$225 million	$260.5 million
2013	Pacific Rim	Guillermo del Toro	Warner Bros. Pictures; Legendary Pictures	$190 million	$411 million
2013	RED 2	Dean Parisot	Summit Entertainment	$84 million	$148.1 million
2013	Elysium	Neill Blomkamp	TriStar Pictures	$115 million	$286.1 million
2013	Lone Survivor	Peter Berg	Universal Pictures	$49 million	$149.3 million
2014	Noah	Darren Aronofsky	Paramount Pictures	$125 million	$362.6 million
2014	Captain America: The Winter Soldier	Anthony and Joe Russo	Marvel Studios	$170 million	$714.4 million
2014	Transformers: Age of Extinction	Michael Bay	Paramount Pictures	$210 million	$1.104 billion
2014	Lucy	Luc Besson	Universal Pictures	$40 million	$463.4 million
2014	Teenage Mutant Ninja Turtles	Jonathan Liebesman	Paramount Pictures	$125 million	$493.3 million
2014	Unbroken	Angelina Jolie	Universal Pictures	$65 million	$163.3 million
2015	Avengers: Age of Ultron	Joss Whedon	Marvel Studios	$279.9 million	$1.405 billion
2015	Tomorrowland	Brad Bird	Walt Disney Pictures	$190 million	$209.2 million
2015	Jurassic World	Colin Trevorrow	Universal Pictures; Amblin Entertainment; Legendary Pictures	$150–215 million	$1.672 billion
2015	Terminator Genisys	Alan Taylor	Paramount Pictures; Skydance Productions	$155 million	$440.6 million
2015	Ant-Man	Peyton Reed	Marvel Studios	$130 million	$519.3 million
2015	Hitman: Agent 47	Aleksander Bach	20th Century Fox	$35 million	$82.3 million
2015	The Martian	Ridley Scott	20th Century Fox	$108 million	$630.2 million
2015	Paranormal Activity: The Ghost Dimension	Gregory Plotkin	Paramount Pictures	$10 million	$78.1 million
2015	Spectre	Sam Mendes	Metro-Goldwyn-Mayer; Columbia Pictures	$250 million	$880.7 million
2015	Star Wars: The Force Awakens (Star Wars: Episode VII - The Force Awakens)	J. J. Abrams	Lucasfilm; Bad Robot	$200 million	$2.071 billion
2015	The Revenant	Alejandro G. Iñárritu	20th Century Fox	$135 million	$533 million
2015	The Big Short	Adam McKay	Paramount Pictures	$28 million	$133.4 million
2016	13 Hours: The Secret Soldiers of Benghazi	Michael Bay	Paramount Pictures	$50 million	$69.4 million
2016	Captain America: Civil War	Anthony and Joe Russo	Marvel Studios	$250 million	$1.155 billion
2016	Teenage Mutant Ninja Turtles: Out of the Shadows	Dave Green	Paramount Pictures	$135 million	$245.6 million
2016	Warcraft	Duncan Jones	Universal Pictures; Legendary Pictures	$160 million	$433.7 million
2016	Deepwater Horizon	Peter Berg	Summit Entertainment	$110 million	$121.7 million
2016	Doctor Strange	Scott Derrickson	Marvel Studios	$165 million	$677.6 million
2016	Rogue One: A Star Wars Story	Gareth Edwards	Lucasfilm	$200 million	$1.058 billion
2016	Silence	Martin Scorsese	Paramount Pictures	$40 million	$23.7 million
2017	The Great Wall	Zhang Yimou	Universal Pictures; Legendary Pictures	$150 million	$334 million
2017	Kong: Skull Island	Jordan Vogt-Roberts	Warner Bros. Pictures; Legendary Pictures	$185 million	$566.7 million
2017	Life	Daniel Espinosa	Columbia Pictures; Skydance	$58 million	$100.5 million
2017	The Mummy	Alex Kurtzman	Universal Pictures	$125 million	$409 million
2017	Transformers: The Last Knight	Michael Bay	Paramount Pictures	$260 million	$605 million
2017	Spider-Man: Homecoming	Jon Watts	Columbia Pictures; Marvel Studios	$175 million	$880 million
2017	Valerian and the City of a Thousand Planets	Luc Besson	STX Entertainment EuropaCorp	$209 million	$225 million
2017	Mother!	Darren Aronofsky	Paramount Pictures	$33 million	$44.5 million
2017	Only the Brave	Joseph Kosinski	Columbia Pictures	$38 million	$25.6 million
2017	Thor: Ragnarok	Taika Waititi	Marvel Studios	$180 million	$854.3 million
2017	Star Wars: The Last Jedi (Star Wars: Episode VIII - The Last Jedi)	Rian Johnson	Lucasfilm	$200 million	$1.333 billion
2017	Downsizing	Alexander Payne	Paramount Pictures	$76 million	$55 million
2018	12 Strong	Nicolai Fuglsig	Warner Bros. Pictures	$35 million	$70.8 million
2018	The Cloverfield Paradox	Julius Onah	Netflix; Paramount Pictures	$45 million	N/A
2018	Black Panther	Ryan Coogler	Marvel Studios	$200 million	$1.349 billion
2018	Monster Hunt 2	Raman Hui	Edko Film; Lionsgate	$143 million	$361.7 million
2018	A Wrinkle in Time	Ava DuVernay	Walt Disney Pictures	$100 million	$132.7 million
2018	Ready Player One	Steven Spielberg	Warner Bros. Pictures	$155–175 million	$608 million
2018	A Quiet Place	John Krasinski	Paramount Pictures	$17 million	$340.7 million
2018	Avengers: Infinity War	Anthony and Joe Russo	Marvel Studios	$300 million	$2.052 billion
2018	Solo: A Star Wars Story	Ron Howard	Lucasfilm	$275 million	$392.9 million
2018	Jurassic World: Fallen Kingdom	J.A. Bayona	Universal Pictures; Amblin Entertainment; Legendary Pictures	$170–465 million	$1.310 billion
2018	Ant-Man and the Wasp	Peyton Reed	Marvel Studios	$162 million	$622.7 million
2018	Skyscraper	Rawson M. Thurber	Universal Pictures	$125 million	$304.1 million
2018	The Other Side of the Wind	Orson Welles	Netflix	$6 million	N/A
2018	Overlord	Julius Avery	Paramount Pictures	$38 million	$41.2 million
2018	Aquaman	James Wan	Warner Bros. Pictures	$200 million	$1.148 billion
2018	Bumblebee	Travis Knight	Paramount Pictures	$102 million	$465.9 million
2018	Bird Box	Susanne Bier	Netflix	$19.8 million	N/A
2019	Captain Marvel	Anna Boden and Ryan Fleck	Marvel Studios	$152 million	$1.131 billion
2019	Us	Jordan Peele	Universal Pictures	$20 million	$254.7 million
2019	Avengers: Endgame	Anthony and Joe Russo	Marvel Studios	$356 million	$2.799 billion
2019	Aladdin	Guy Ritchie	Walt Disney Pictures	$183 million	$1.054 billion
2019	Spider-Man: Far From Home	Jon Watts	Columbia Pictures; Marvel Studios	$160 million	$1.132 billion
2019	The Irishman	Martin Scorsese	Netflix	$159 million	$8 million
2019	Terminator: Dark Fate	Tim Miller	Paramount Pictures; Tencent Pictures; 20th Century Fox; Skydance Media	$186 million	$261.1 million
2019	Playing with Fire	Andy Fickman	Paramount Pictures	$29.9 million	$64.4 million
2019	6 Underground	Michael Bay	Netflix	$150 million	N/A
2019	Star Wars: The Rise of Skywalker (Star Wars: Episode IX - The Rise Of Skywalker)	J. J. Abrams	Lucasfilm; Bad Robot	$275 million	$1.077 billion

=== 2020s ===
Year	Films	Director(s)	Studio(s) and Distributor(s)	Budget	Gross
2020	Artemis Fowl	Kenneth Branagh	Walt Disney Pictures; Disney+	$125 million	N/A
2020	Mank	David Fincher	Netflix	$20–30 million	$99,752
2020	We Can Be Heroes	Robert Rodriguez	Netflix	N/A	N/A
2020	The Midnight Sky	George Clooney	Netflix	$100 million	$62,557
2021	Finding 'Ohana	Jude Weng	Netflix	N/A	N/A
2021	Chaos Walking	Doug Liman	Lionsgate	$100 million	$21.9 million
2021	Coming 2 America	Craig Brewer	Amazon Studios; Paramount Pictures	$60 million	N/A
2021	A Quiet Place Part II	John Krasinski	Paramount Pictures	$61 million	$293.5 million
2021	F9	Justin Lin	Universal Pictures	$200–225 million	$726.2 million
2021	Black Widow	Cate Shortland	Marvel Studios	$200 million	$379.6 million
2021	Space Jam: A New Legacy	Malcolm D. Lee	Warner Bros. Pictures	$150 million	$162.8 million
2021	Malignant	James Wan	New Line Cinema	$40 million	$30.3 million
2021	Jungle Cruise	Jaume Collet-Serra	Walt Disney Pictures	$200 million	$220.9 million
2021	Free Guy	Shawn Levy	20th Century Studios	$100–125 million	$331.5 million
2021	No Time to Die	Cary Joji Fukunaga	Metro-Goldwyn-Mayer Universal Pictures	$250–301 million	$774.2 million
2021	Eternals	Chloé Zhao	Marvel Studios	$200 million	$402.1 million
2021	Red Notice	Rawson Marshall Thurber	Netflix	$200 million	$2 million
2022	The Batman	Matt Reeves	Warner Bros. Pictures	$200 million	$770.8 million
2022	The Bubble	Judd Apatow	Netflix	$100 million	N/A
2022	Doctor Strange in the Multiverse of Madness	Sam Raimi	Marvel Studios	$200 million	$955.8 million
2022	Jurassic World Dominion	Colin Trevorrow	Universal Pictures; Amblin Entertainment	$185–465 million	$1.004 billion
2022	Thor: Love and Thunder	Taika Waititi	Marvel Studios	$250 million	$760.9 million
2022	The Gray Man	Anthony and Joe Russo	Netflix	$200 million	$454,023
2022	Good Night Oppy	Ryan White	Amazon Studios	N/A	$3,663
2022	Black Panther: Wakanda Forever	Ryan Coogler	Marvel Studios	$250 million	$859.2 million
2022	The Fabelmans	Steven Spielberg	Universal Pictures	$40 million	$45.1 million
2022	Avatar: The Way of Water	James Cameron	20th Century Studios; Lightstorm Entertainment	$350–460 million	$2.320 billion
2022	Babylon	Damien Chazelle	Paramount Pictures	$78–80 million	$63.4 million
2022	The Pale Blue Eye	Scott Cooper	Netflix	$72 million	$129,928
2023	Ant-Man and the Wasp: Quantumania	Peyton Reed	Marvel Studios	$250–275 million	$476.1 million
2023	Dungeons & Dragons: Honor Among Thieves	Jonathan Goldstein; John Francis Daley	Paramount Pictures	$150 million	$208.2 million
2023	Renfield	Chris McKay	Universal Pictures	$65 million	$26.9 million
2023	Guardians of the Galaxy Vol. 3	James Gunn	Marvel Studios	$250 million	$845.6 million
2023	Fast X	Louis Leterrier	Universal Pictures	$378.8 million	$714.6 million
2023	Indiana Jones and the Dial of Destiny	James Mangold	Walt Disney Pictures; Lucasfilm; Paramount Pictures	$295 million	$384 million
2023	Mission: Impossible – Dead Reckoning Part One	Christopher McQuarrie	Paramount Pictures	$219–291 million	$571.1 million
2023	Haunted Mansion	Justin Simien	Walt Disney Pictures	$150 million	$117.5 million
2023	The Creator	Gareth Edwards	20th Century Studios	$80 million	$104.3 million
2023	Killers of the Flower Moon	Martin Scorsese	Paramount Pictures; Apple Original Films	$200 million	$158.8 million
2023	The Marvels	Nia DaCosta	Marvel Studios	$220–378 million	$206.1 million
2023	Napoleon	Ridley Scott	Columbia Pictures; Apple Original Films	$130–200 million	$222.4 million
2023	Candy Cane Lane	Reginald Hudlin	Amazon Prime Video	N/A	N/A
2023	Aquaman and the Lost Kingdom	James Wan	Warner Bros. Pictures	$205–215 million	$440.2 million
2023	The Boys in the Boat	George Clooney	Metro-Goldwyn-Mayer	$40 million	$55.5 million
2024	Road House	Doug Liman	Amazon Prime Video	$85 million	N/A
2024	Atlas	Brad Peyton	Netflix	$100 million	N / A
2024	A Quiet Place: Day One	Michael Sarnoski	Paramount Pictures	$67 million	$261.8 million
2024	Twisters	Lee Isaac Chung	Universal Pictures; Warner Bros. Pictures; Amblin Entertainment	$155 million	$372.3 million
2024	Deadpool & Wolverine	Shawn Levy	Marvel Studios	$200 million	$1.338 billion
2024	Alien: Romulus	Fede Álvarez	20th Century Studios	$80 million	$350.9 million
2024	Rez Ball	Sydney Freeland	Netflix	N / A	N/A
2024	Joker: Folie à Deux	Todd Phillips	Warner Bros. Pictures	$200 million	$206.4 million
2024	Venom: The Last Dance	Kelly Marcel	Columbia Pictures	$120 million	$479 million
2024	Blitz	Steve McQueen	Apple TV+	N/A	N/A
2024	Gladiator II	Ridley Scott	Paramount Pictures	$210–310 million	$462.2 million
2024	Wicked	Jon M. Chu	Universal Pictures	$145–150 million	$728.1 million
2024	Sonic the Hedgehog 3	Jeff Fowler	Paramount Pictures	$122 million	$492 million
2025	Back in Action	Seth Gordon	Netflix	$158.9–207.2 million	N/A
2025	The Electric State	Anthony and Joe Russo	Netflix	$320 million	N/A
2025	The Amateur	James Hawes	20th Century Studios	$60 million	$96 million
2025	Sinners	Ryan Coogler	Warner Bros. Pictures	$90–100 million	$370.2 million
2025	Thunderbolts*	Jake Schreier	Marvel Studios	$180 million	$382.4 million
2025	Mission: Impossible – The Final Reckoning	Christopher McQuarrie	Paramount Pictures	$300–400 million	$598.8 million
2025	Lilo & Stitch	Dean Fleischer Camp	Walt Disney Pictures	$100 million	$1.038 billion
2025	F1	Joseph Kosinski	Warner Bros. Pictures; Apple Original Films	$200–300 million	$634 million
2025	Jurassic World Rebirth	Gareth Edwards	Universal Pictures; Amblin Entertainment	$180–254 million	$872.4 million
2025	Superman	James Gunn	Warner Bros. Pictures; DC Studios	$225 million	$618.7 million
2025	The Fantastic Four: First Steps	Matt Shakman	Marvel Studios	$200 million	$521.9 million
2025	The Lost Bus	Paul Greengrass	Apple TV+	N/A	N/A
2025	A Big Bold Beautiful Journey	Kogonada	Columbia Pictures	$45 million	$20.2 million
2025	Tron: Ares	Joachim Rønning	Walt Disney Pictures	$180–220 million	$142.2 million
2025	Frankenstein	Guillermo del Toro	Netflix	$120 million	$480,678
2025	Predator: Badlands	Dan Trachtenberg	20th Century Studios	$105 million	$184.6 million
2025	The Running Man	Edgar Wright	Paramount Pictures	$110 million	$68.6 million
2025	Wicked: For Good	Jon M. Chu	Universal Pictures	$150 million	$540.7 million
2025	Avatar: Fire and Ash	James Cameron	20th Century Studios; Lightstorm Entertainment	$350–400 million	$1.490 billion
2025	Anaconda	Tom Gormican	Columbia Pictures	$45 million	$135.4 million
2026	Send Help	Sam Raimi	20th Century Studios	$40 million	$94 million
2026	The Bride!	Maggie Gyllenhaal	Warner Bros. Pictures	$80–90 million	$24 million
2026	Project Hail Mary	Phil Lord and Christopher Miller	Amazon MGM Studios	$200–248 million	$685.3 million
2026	Apex	Baltasar Kormákur	Netflix	N / A	N / A
2026	Michael	Antoine Fuqua	Lionsgate; Universal Pictures	$155–200 million	$1.021 billion
2026	The Mandalorian and Grogu	Jon Favreau	Lucasfilm; Walt Disney Pictures	$165 million	$345.8 million
2026	Masters of the Universe	Travis Knight	Amazon MGM Studios	$170–200 million	$114 million
2026	The Death of Robin Hood	Michael Sarnoski	A24	$20 million	$9.5 million
2026	Supergirl	Craig Gillespie	Warner Bros. Pictures; DC Studios	$170–186 million	$126.4 million
2026	Moana	Thomas Kail	Walt Disney Pictures	$250 million	$323.6 million
2026	Spider-Man: Brand New Day	Destin Daniel Cretton	Marvel Studios; Columbia Pictures	$225 million	$2.514 billion
2026	The Last House	Louis Leterrier	Netflix	N/A	N/A
2026	The End of Oak Street	David Robert Mitchell	Warner Bros. Pictures	$80–92 million	$122 million
2026	Digger	Alejandro González Iñárritu	Warner Bros. Pictures	$125 million	$41 million
2026	Whalefall	Brian Duffield	20th Century Studios	$60 million	$17.5 million

=== Upcoming ===
Year	Films	Director(s)	Studio(s) and Distributor(s)	Budget	Gross
2026
2026	The Mosquito Bowl	Peter Berg	Netflix	TBA	
2026	Avengers: Doomsday	Anthony and Joe Russo	Marvel Studios	TBA	
2026	Jumanji: Open World	Jake Kasdan	Columbia Pictures	TBA	
2027	Children of Blood and Bone	Gina Prince-Bythewood	Paramount Pictures	TBA	
2027	Spaceballs: The New One	Josh Greenbaum	Amazon MGM Studios	TBA	
2027	Star Wars: Starfighter	Shawn Levy	Lucasfilm	TBA	
2027	A Quiet Place Part III	John Krasinski	Paramount Pictures	TBA	
2027	Voltron	Rawson Marshall Thurber	Amazon MGM Studios	TBA	
2028	Elden Ring	Alex Garland	A24	$200 million	

== Animated films ==
Year	Films	Director(s)	Studio(s) and Distributor(s)	Budget	Gross
2008	WALL-E (Note: Live action scenes only)	Andrew Stanton	Walt Disney Pictures; Pixar Animation Studios	$180 million	$532.5 million
2011	Rango	Gore Verbinski	Paramount Pictures Nickelodeon Movies	$135 million	$245.7 million
2015	Strange Magic	Gary Rydstrom	Touchstone Pictures; Lucasfilm Ltd.	$70 million	$13.6 million
2021	Wish Dragon	Chris Appelhans	Columbia Pictures; Sony Pictures Animation; Netflix	$25 million	$25.9 million
2024	Ultraman: Rising	Shannon Tindle	Netflix	N/A	N/A
2024	Transformers One	Josh Cooley	Paramount Pictures	$75–147 million	$128.9 million

=== Upcoming ===
Year	Films	Director(s)	Studio(s) and Distributor(s)	Budget
2028	Oh, the Places You'll Go	Jon M. Chu	Warner Bros. Pictures	TBA
2028	The Lunar Chronicles	Noëlle Raffaele	Warner Bros. Pictures	TBA

== Television ==
=== 1980s ===
Year	Series	Studio(s) and Distributor(s)	Network
1985–87	Amazing Stories	Amblin Entertainment; Universal Television	NBC
1987–94	Star Trek: The Next Generation	Paramount Domestic Television	Syndicated

=== 1990s ===
Year	Series	Studio(s) and Distributor(s)	Network
1995	Tales from the Crypt (Season 6); Episode: "You, Murderer"	Geffen Television	HBO
1992–93	The Young Indiana Jones Chronicles	Amblin Television; Lucasfilm Ltd. Television; Paramount Television	ABC

=== 2010s ===
Year	Series	Studio(s) and Distributor(s)	Network
2014	The Big Bang Theory (Season 7); Episode: "The Proton Transmogrification"	Warner Bros. Television	CBS
2015	Agent Carter (Season 1)	Marvel Television; ABC Studios	ABC
2019	Krypton (Season 2)	Warner Horizon Television	Syfy
2019	The Mandalorian (Season 1)	Lucasfilm Ltd.	Disney+

=== 2020s ===
Year	Series	Studio(s) and Distributor(s)	Network
2020	Brave New World	Universal Content Productions	Peacock
2020	The Boys (Season 2)	Sony Pictures Television Studios; Amazon Studios	Amazon Prime Video
2020	The Mandalorian (Season 2)	Lucasfilm Ltd.	Disney+
2020	The Stand	CBS Studios	CBS All Access
2021	WandaVision	Marvel Studios	Disney+
2021	NBC Sunday Night Football (opening sequence)	N/A	NBC
2021	The Underground Railroad	Amazon Studios	Amazon Prime Video
2021	Loki (Season 1)	Marvel Studios	Disney+
2021	Y: The Last Man	FX Productions	Hulu
2021	Hawkeye	Marvel Studios	Disney+
2021	The Witcher (Season 2)	Netflix Studios	Netflix
2021	The Book of Boba Fett	Lucasfilm Ltd.	Disney+
2022	Obi-Wan Kenobi	Lucasfilm Ltd.	Disney+
2022	Lovely Little Farm (Season 1)	Apple Studios	Apple TV+
2022	The Old Man	20th Television	FX
2022	Light & Magic (Season 1)	Lucasfilm Ltd.	Disney+
2022	The Sandman (Season 1)	Warner Bros. Television	Netflix
2022	Lost Ollie	Netflix Studios	Netflix
2022	The Lord of the Rings: The Rings of Power (Season 1)	Amazon Studios; New Line Cinema	Amazon Prime Video
2022	Andor (Season 1)	Lucasfilm Ltd.	Disney+
2022	Willow	Lucasfilm Ltd.	Disney+
2023	The Mandalorian (Season 3)	Lucasfilm Ltd.	Disney+
2023	Ahsoka (Season 1)	Lucasfilm Ltd.	Disney+
2023	Loki (Season 2)	Marvel Studios	Disney+
2023	Life on Our Planet	Amblin Television; Netflix Studios	Netflix
2023	All the Light We Cannot See	Netflix Studios	Netflix
2023	The Santa Clauses (Season 2)	20th Television	Disney+
2023	Percy Jackson and the Olympians (Season 1)	20th Television	Disney+
2024	Echo	Marvel Studios	Disney+
2024	Masters of the Air	Amblin Television; Apple Studios	Apple TV+
2024	Station 19 (Season 7); Episode: "My Way"	ABC Signature	ABC
2024	Knuckles	Paramount Pictures	Paramount+
2024	The Acolyte	Lucasfilm Ltd.	Disney+
2024	The Boys (Season 4)	Sony Pictures Television; Amazon MGM Studios	Amazon Prime Video
2024	Time Bandits	Paramount Television Studios	Apple TV+
2024	The Lord of the Rings: The Rings of Power (Season 2)	Amazon MGM Studios; New Line Cinema	Amazon Prime Video
2024	Silo (Season 2)	AMC Studios; Apple Studios	Apple TV+
2024	Star Wars: Skeleton Crew	Lucasfilm Ltd.	Disney+
2025	Severance (Season 2)	Fifth Season; Apple Studios	Apple TV+
2025	Light & Magic (Season 2)	Lucasfilm Ltd.	Disney+
2025	Andor (Season 2)	Lucasfilm Ltd.	Disney+
2025	Duster	Bad Robot; Warner Bros. Television	Max
2025	Ironheart	Marvel Television	Disney+
2025	Smoke	Apple Studios	Apple TV+
2025	The Sandman (Season 2)	Warner Bros. Television	Netflix
2025	Invasion (Season 3)	Apple Studios	Apple TV+
2025	Stranger Things 5	Netflix Studios	Netflix
2025	Percy Jackson and the Olympians (Season 2)	20th Television	Disney+
2025	Fallout (Season 2)	Amazon MGM Studios	Amazon Prime Video
2026	The Dinosaurs	Amblin Documentaries	Netflix
2026	The Boroughs	Upside Down Pictures; Netflix Studios	Netflix
2026	Spider-Noir	Sony Pictures Television; Marvel Entertainment; Amazon MGM Studios	MGM+ Prime Video
2026	Silo' (Season 3)	AMC Studios; Apple Studios	Apple TV
2026	VisionQuest	Marvel Television	Disney+

=== Upcoming ===
Year	Series	Studio(s) and Distributor(s)	Network
2026	The Lord of the Rings: The Rings of Power (Season 3)	Amazon MGM Studios; New Line Cinema	Prime Video
2027	Ahsoka (Season 2)	Lucasfilm Ltd.	Disney+

=== Television films and specials ===
Year	Films	Studio(s) and Distributor(s)	Network
1984	Caravan of Courage: An Ewok Adventure	Lucasfilm Ltd. 20th Century Fox	ABC
1985	Ewoks: The Battle for Endor	Lucasfilm Ltd.	ABC
1994	Young Indiana Jones and the Hollywood Follies	Lucasfilm Ltd. Amblin Entertainment; Paramount Television	ABC
1995	Young Indiana Jones and the Treasure of the Peacock's Eye	Lucasfilm Ltd. Amblin Entertainment; Paramount Television	ABC
1995	Young Indiana Jones and the Attack of the Hawkmen	Lucasfilm Ltd. Amblin Entertainment; Paramount Television	ABC
1996	Young Indiana Jones: Travels with Father	Lucasfilm Ltd. Amblin Entertainment; Paramount Television	ABC
2022	The Guardians of the Galaxy Holiday Special	Marvel Studios	Disney+

== Live shows ==
Year	Concert	Location
2022–present	ABBA Voyage	ABBA Arena (Queen Elizabeth Olympic Park, London, United Kingdom)
2023–2024	U2:UV Achtung Baby Live at Sphere	Sphere (Paradise, Nevada, United States)
2023–2025	Postcard from Earth	Sphere (Paradise, Nevada, United States)
2024–2025	Dead & Company: Dead Forever: Live at Sphere	Sphere (Paradise, Nevada, United States)

== Commercials ==
- General Cinema (1986, 1993, 1996)
- THX (1988, 1993)
- Merrill Lynch "Desert Skies" and "Bullseye" (1990)
- Nike (1992, 1999)
- BP (1993)
- Perrier (1993)
- Intel (1993)
- 3M "Imagine" (1994)
- Ford Mercury "Launch" (1995)
- TGI Fridays (1995)
- Supercuts "Stylin'" (1995)
- Coca-Cola Classic (1995)
- BMW (1996)
- Snapple "Mikey" (1996)
- Canada Dry "Domino" (1996)
- General Motors EV1 "Appliances" (1996)
- DreamWorks Pictures (1997)
- Pontiac "Coyote" (1998, with Warner Bros. Classic Animation)
- Armor All (1998)
- First Union Bank (1998)
- GoodHome.com (1999)
- Honey Comb "Crazy Craving" (2000, 2003)
- Gatorade "Raptor" (2000)
- California Raisin Marketing Board (print ads, 2000)
- Budweiser "Come Home" (2001)
- Alcatel "MLK" (2001)
- Vodafone commercials featuring Yoda (2012)
- Reese's Pieces "E.T." (2002)
- Walt Disney Pictures (2022)

== See also ==
- Wētā FX
- Wētā Workshop
- Moving Picture Company
- Digital Domain
- DNEG
- Framestore
- Animal Logic
- Blue Sky Studios
- Sony Pictures Imageworks
- Lola Visual Effects
- Pacific Data Images
- Rhythm & Hues Studios
- Blur Studio
- Image Engine
- Square Enix Image Studio Division
- Pixar
- Polygon Pictures
- Softimage 3D
- Tippett Studio
- Pixar RenderMan
- Alias PowerAnimator
- Alias Maya
- Pixomondo
- Cinesite
- Reel FX Animation
