= Belden (given name) =

Belden is a masculine given name. Notable people with the name include:

- Belden Bly (1914–2006), American teacher
- Belden Hill (1864–1934), American baseball player
- Belden Namah (21st century), Papua New Guinean politician
- David Belden Lyman (1803–1884), American missionary
- Silas Belden Dutcher (1829–1909), New York State Superintendent of Public Works
- Brace Belden (21st century), American union activist and media personality
