= Death Star (business) =

Power grid strategy by Enron

The Death Star strategy (named after the Death Star space station and weapon from the movie Star Wars) was the name Enron gave to their practice of shuffling energy around the California power grid to receive payments from the state for "relieving congestion". According to the company's own memo they would be paid "for moving energy to relieve congestion, without actually moving any energy or relieving any congestion."

For example, if the California power grid was congested with energy flowing south, Enron would schedule energy to be transmitted north to Oregon. They would receive a payment from California for apparently relieving congestion on the grid. Then Enron would schedule the energy to be transferred back to its point of origin, but not through California. Ultimately the energy would end up right back where it started, and Enron would be paid by California without actually putting any electricity on their grid.

The firm acknowledged in internal documents the inherent ethical dilemmas, in one internal document stating "Traders could buy power at $250 and sell it for $1,200. Doing so appears not to present any problems, other than a public relations risk arising from the fact that such exports may have contributed to California's declaration of a Stage 2 Emergency yesterday."

== Similar business practices by Enron ==
Enron used a number of other named fraudulent business practices in the years leading to its collapse. Most prominent among them:

- "Fat Boy": This scam (aka "Inc-ing") also involved overscheduling power transmission – for example, to a company subsidiary that did not really need all of it. Then Enron would sell the "excess" power to the state at a premium.
- "Ricochet": Also called "Ping Pong" or "megawatt-laundering" (by analogy to money laundering), Ricochet was the power equivalent of a land flip: buy in-state power cheaply, flip it out-of-state to an intermediary, then re-sell it to California at a highly inflated "imported" price.
- "Black Widow": Enron intentionally introduced errors to potentially money-losing transactions and would use those errors to invalidate transactions if they lost money.
- "Bigfoot": Enron introduced low electricity bids but signed them as a competitor, depressing energy prices to enable low-priced Enron purchases.
- "Get Shorty": Enron sold electricity it did not own, depressed demand, then purchased back the notional electricity at lowered prices.

John Forney, a former energy trader who invented various strategies such as the "Death Star," and even had a secondary term for "Death Star" named after him ("Forney's Perpetual Loop"), was indicted in December 2002 on 11 counts of conspiracy and wire fraud. His supervisors, Timothy Belden and Jeffrey Richter, both pleaded guilty to conspiring to commit wire fraud and assisted prosecutors. On August 5, 2004, Forney pleaded guilty to conspiracy to commit wire fraud and was given two years probation and a $4,000 fine.
