= Belden, Illinois =

- Unincorporated community
- Location within Illinois Location within the United States
- Coordinates: 42°28′27″N 88°20′50″W
- Country: United States
- State: Illinois
- County: McHenry
- Elevation: 889 ft (271 m)
- Time zone: UTC-6 (Central (CST))
  - Summer (DST): UTC-5 (CDT)
- Area codes: 815 & 779
- GNIS feature ID: 422450

Belden is an unincorporated community in McHenry County, Illinois, United States.
