= Death Star (ILM) =

Industrial Light & Magic render farm

The Death Star is the name of the render farm owned by Industrial Light & Magic (ILM). It is a cluster computer originally built by SGI. Since then, it has been converted into a Linux system built by RackSaver (now Verari Systems) with AMD processors. It is one of the largest render farms. The system originally had 1,500 processors in 750 nodes, this figure was doubled for Star Wars: Episode III – Revenge of the Sith. ILM tends to be quiet about their supercomputer, so its current configuration is not known.
