= Timothy Belden =

American businessman

Timothy Norris Belden (born 1967) is the former head of trading in Enron Energy Services. He is considered the mastermind of Enron's scheme to drive up California's energy prices, by developing many of the trading strategies that resulted in the California electricity crisis. Belden pleaded guilty to one count of conspiracy to commit wire fraud as part of a plea bargain, along with his cooperation with authorities to help convict many top Enron executives.

Belden was sentenced on February 14, 2007, to two years of court-supervised release and the forfeiture of $2.1 million. Federal prosecutors recommended probation because Belden cooperated in the case, assisting with the prosecution of senior Enron executives.

Both Jeff Richter and John Forney were sentenced to probation and fined (Richter $10,000, Forney $4,000).

The maximum statutory penalty for conspiracy, in violation of 18 U.S.C. § 371, is five years in prison and a $250,000 fine. None of which are being met by Belden or the other convicted accomplices John Forney or Jeffery Richter. All three pleaded guilty to and were convicted of the same one count of conspiracy to commit wire fraud.

Belden was known to have received a $5 million bonus from Enron as a reward for the profits he extracted from California for Enron.

He holds a master's degree in public policy from the Goldman School of Public Policy at UC-Berkeley and spent five years working as a researcher at the Lawrence Berkeley National Laboratory.

In 2009, Belden founded Energy GPS LLC with Jeff Richter in Portland, Oregon, to "provide analysis and advice to clients in the energy industry"

== See also ==
- Enron: The Smartest Guys in the Room
