= Alan Dean Foster =

American fiction writer (born 1946)

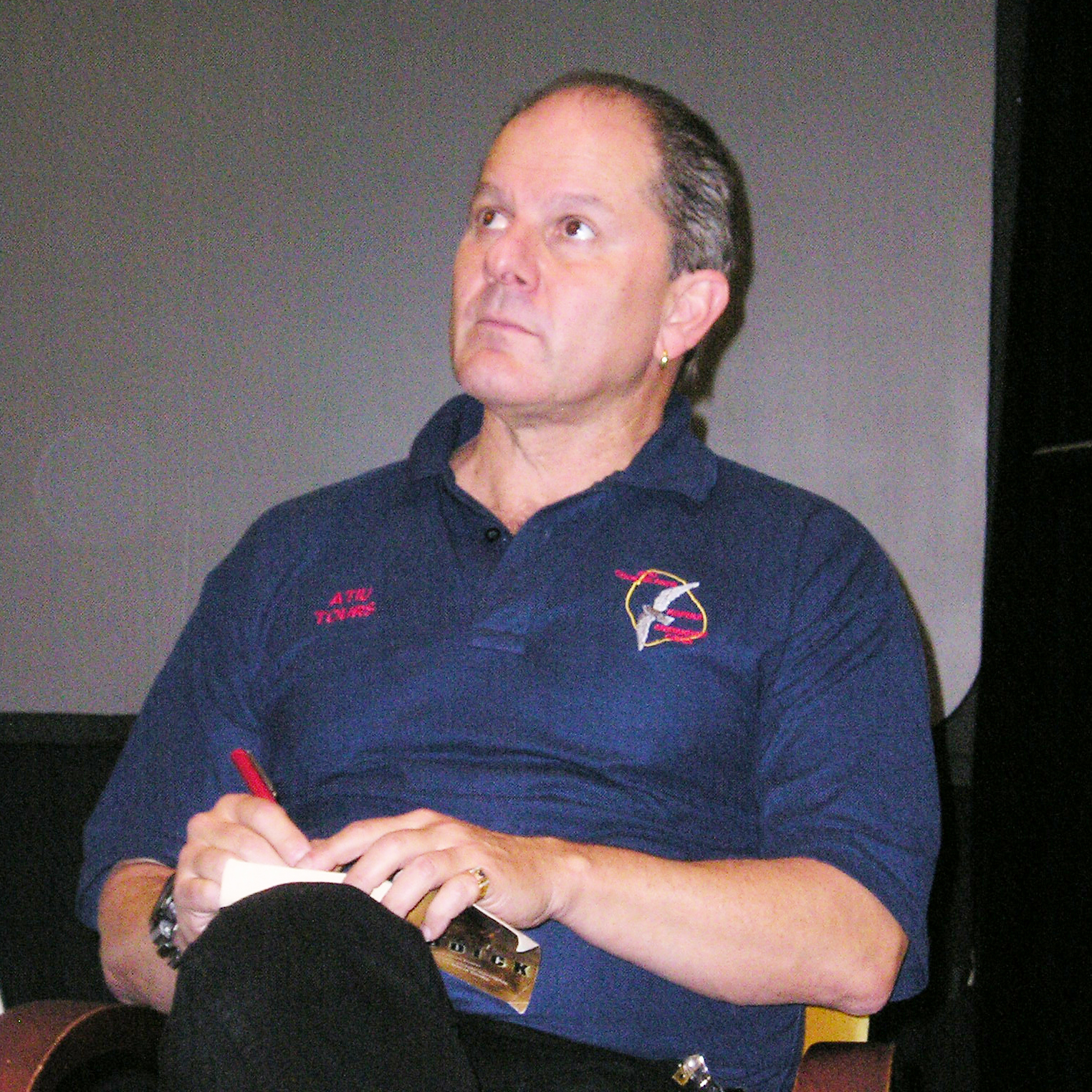
- Foster at BayCon in 2007
- Born: November 18, 1946 (age 79); New York City, U.S.
- Occupation: Fiction writer
- Relatives: Lesley Gore (cousin)
- Writing career
- Pen name: James Lawson (Note: This pen name was used for the first publication of many of the Montezuma Strip stories.)
- Period: 1971–present
- Genres: Science fiction, fantasy
- Notable works: Humanx Commonwealth and Spellsinger series
- Website: alandeanfoster.com

Alan Dean Foster (born November 18, 1946) is an American writer of fantasy and science fiction. He has written several book series, more than 20 standalone novels, and many novelizations of film scripts.

== Career ==
=== Star Wars ===
Foster was the ghostwriter of the original novelization of Star Wars, which was credited solely to George Lucas. When asked if it was difficult for him to see Lucas get all the credit for Star Wars, Foster said, "Not at all. It was George's story idea. I was merely expanding upon it. Not having my name on the cover didn't bother me in the least. It would be akin to a contractor demanding to have his name on a Frank Lloyd Wright house."

Foster also wrote the follow-up novel Splinter of the Mind's Eye (1978), written with the intention of being adapted as a low-budget sequel to Star Wars if the film was unsuccessful. However, Star Wars was a blockbusting success, and The Empire Strikes Back (1980) would be developed instead. Foster's story relied heavily on abandoned concepts that appeared in Lucas's early treatments for the first film.

Foster returned to the franchise for the prequel-era novel The Approaching Storm (2002), and also wrote the novelization of the first sequel trilogy film, The Force Awakens (2015).

=== Alien ===
Foster has written novelizations of several films in the Alien franchise, beginning with the first film. He was not allowed to view H.R. Giger's design for the titular creature, leading to the use of vague descriptions such as "something man-shaped but definitely not a man". This adaptation has been noted as a "classic" of novelizations that is "almost as timeless as the movie". It was later collected in omnibus form with Foster's novelizations of Aliens and Alien 3. During the writing of the latter, he attempted to avoid killing off the two characters, Newt and Hicks as in the screenplay but was overruled by the film's producers. This led to him turning down the novelization of the following film, Alien: Resurrection, although Foster later returned to the series to novelize Alien: Covenant and write a further spin-off, Alien: Covenant – Origins.

=== Star Trek ===
Foster wrote 10 books based on episodes of the animated Star Trek, the first six books each consisting of three linked novella-length episode adaptations, and the last four being expanded adaptations of single episodes that segued into an original story. In the mid-seventies, he wrote original Star Trek stories for the Peter Pan-label Star Trek audio story records. He has the story credit for Star Trek: The Motion Picture, as he wrote a treatment based on a two-page outline by Gene Roddenberry.

He later wrote the novelization of the 2009 film Star Trek, his first Star Trek novel in over 30 years, and for Star Trek's sequel, Star Trek Into Darkness.

=== Dispute with Disney ===
In 2020, Foster, together with the Science Fiction and Fantasy Writers of America (SFWA), alleged that The Walt Disney Company, which acquired rights to his Star Wars and Alien novels via their acquisitions of Lucasfilm and 20th Century Fox, had not paid him royalties for e-book sales of his books. The issue was resolved in May 2021, when Disney arranged to pay Foster and his fellow Star Wars novelization authors James Kahn and Donald F. Glut their royalties.

== Awards ==
Foster won the 2008 Grand Master award from the International Association of Media Tie-In Writers.

== Bibliography ==
=== Humanx Commonwealth Universe ===
See the Humanx Commonwealth page.

=== The Damned Trilogy ===
1. A Call to Arms (1991) ISBN 0-345-35855-4
2. The False Mirror (1992) ISBN 0-345-35856-2
3. The Spoils of War (1993) ISBN 0-345-35857-0

=== Dinotopia universe ===
- Dinotopia Lost (1996) ISBN 1-57036-279-3
- The Hand of Dinotopia (1997) ISBN 1-57036-396-X

=== Journeys of the Catechist ===
1. Carnivores of Light and Darkness (1998) ISBN 0-446-52132-9
2. Into the Thinking Kingdoms (1999) ISBN 0-446-52136-1
3. A Triumph of Souls (2000) ISBN 0-446-52218-X

=== Marexx ===
1. Builder (unpublished)

=== Spellsinger series ===
1. Spellsinger (1983) ISBN 0-446-97352-1
2. The Hour of the Gate (1984) ISBN 0-446-90354-X
3. The Day of the Dissonance (1984) ISBN 0-446-32133-8
4. The Moment of the Magician (1984) ISBN 0-446-32326-8
5. The Paths of the Perambulator (1985) ISBN 0-446-32679-8
6. The Time of the Transference (1986) ISBN 0-932096-43-3
7. Son of Spellsinger (1993) ISBN 0-446-36257-3
8. Chorus Skating (1994) ISBN 0-446-36237-9

"Serenade" (2004), a novelette set immediately after The Time of the Transference, was first published in the anthology Masters of Fantasy and was later reprinted in Foster's short story collection Exceptions to Reality.

=== The Taken trilogy ===
1. Lost and Found (2004) ISBN 0-345-46125-8
2. The Light Years Beneath My Feet (2005) ISBN 0-345-46128-2
3. The Candle of Distant Earth (2005) ISBN 0-345-46131-2

=== The Tipping Point trilogy ===
- The Human Blend (2010) ISBN 978-0-345-51197-3
- Body, Inc. (2012) ISBN 978-0-345-51199-7
- The Sum of Her Parts (2012) ISBN 978-0-345-51202-4

=== Montezuma Strip ===
- Montezuma Strip (1995) ISBN 0-446-60207-8
- The Mocking Program (2002) ISBN 0-446-52774-2

=== Standalone novels ===
- The Man Who Used the Universe (1983) ISBN 0-446-90353-1
- The I Inside (1984) ISBN 0-446-32027-7
- Slipt (1984) ISBN 0-425-07006-9
- Into the Out Of (1986) ISBN 0-446-51337-7
- Glory Lane (1987) ISBN 0-441-51664-5
- Maori (1988) ISBN 0-441-51925-3
- To the Vanishing Point (1988) ISBN 0-446-51338-5
- Quozl (1989) ISBN 0-441-69454-3
- Cyber Way (1990) ISBN 0-441-13245-6
- Cat-a-lyst (1991) ISBN 0-441-64661-1
- Codgerspace (1992) ISBN 0-441-71851-5
- Greenthieves (1994) ISBN 0-441-00104-1
- Design for Great-Day (1995) ISBN 0-312-85501-X, with Eric Frank Russell)
- Life Form (1995) ISBN 0-441-00218-8
- Voyage of the Basset (written and Illustrated by James C. Christensen with Foster and Renwick St. James) (1996) ISBN 1-885-18358-5
- Jed the Dead (1997) ISBN 0-441-00399-0
- Parallelities (1998) ISBN 0-345-42461-1
- Primal Shadows (2001) ISBN 0-312-87771-4
- Interlopers (2001) ISBN 0-441-00847-X
- Kingdoms of Light (2001) ISBN 0-446-52667-3
- Sagramanda (2006) ISBN 1-59102-488-9
- Relic (2018) ISBN 978-1101967638

=== Collections ===
- With Friends Like These ... (1977) ISBN 0-345-25701-4
- ... Who Needs Enemies? (1984) ISBN 0-345-31657-6
- The Metrognome and Other Stories (1990) ISBN 0-345-36356-6
- Mad Amos (1996) ISBN 0-345-39362-7
- Impossible Places (2002) ISBN 0-345-45041-8
- Exceptions to Reality (2008) ISBN 0-345-49604-3
- The Flavors of Other Worlds (2019) ISBN 978-1-61475-986-7
- The Taste of Different Dimensions (2019) ISBN 978-1-61475-957-7

=== Anthologies edited ===
- Smart Dragons, Foolish Elves (1991) with Martin H. Greenberg
- Betcha Can't Read Just One (1993)
- Short Stories from Small Islands: Tales Shared in Palau (2005)

=== Novelizations ===
==== Star Trek universe ====
===== Star Trek: The Animated Series =====
1. Star Trek Log One (1974) ISBN 0-345-24014-6
2. Star Trek Log Two (1974) ISBN 0-345-25812-6
3. Star Trek Log Three (1975) ISBN 0-345-24260-2
4. Star Trek Log Four (1975) ISBN 0-345-24435-4
5. Star Trek Log Five (1975) ISBN 0-345-33351-9
6. Star Trek Log Six (1976) ISBN 0-345-24655-1
7. Star Trek Log Seven (1976) ISBN 0-345-24965-8
8. Star Trek Log Eight (1976) ISBN 0-345-25141-5
9. Star Trek Log Nine (1977) ISBN 0-345-25557-7
10. Star Trek Log Ten (1978) ISBN 0-345-27212-9

===== Star Trek movies =====
- Star Trek: The Motion Picture (1979), story credit
- Star Trek (2009) ISBN 978-1-4391-5886-9, movie novelization
- Star Trek Into Darkness (2013) ISBN 978-1-4767-1648-0, movie novelization
- Star Trek: The Unsettling Stars (2020) ISBN 1982140607, movie tie-in

==== Star Wars universe ====
- Star Wars: From the Adventures of Luke Skywalker (1976) ISBN 0-345-26079-1, novelization of Star Wars ghost writing as George Lucas
- Splinter of the Mind's Eye (1978) ISBN 0-345-27566-7
- The Approaching Storm (2002) ISBN 0-345-44300-4
- Star Wars: The Force Awakens (2015), movie novelization
- "Bait" (2015), short story

==== Alien universe ====
1. Alien (1979) ISBN 0-446-82977-3
2. Aliens (1986) ISBN 0-446-30139-6
3. Alien 3 (1992) ISBN 0-446-36216-6
4. Alien: Covenant (2017) ISBN 1-785-65478-0
5. Alien: Covenant - Origins (2017) ISBN 9781785654763

==== Terminator universe ====
- Terminator Salvation (2009) ISBN 1-84856-085-0, movie novelization

==== Transformers ====
- Transformers (2007) ISBN 0-345-49799-6
- Transformers: Ghosts of Yesterday (2007) ISBN 0-345-49798-8
- Transformers: Revenge of the Fallen (2009) ISBN 978-0-345-51593-3
- Transformers: The Veiled Threat (2009) ISBN 0-345-51592-7

==== Standalone novelizations ====
- Dark Star (1974) ISBN 0-345-24267-X, movie novelization
- Luana (Italian film) (1974) ISBN 0-345-23793-5, movie novelization
- Maude (unpublished 1974), television novelization ("Maude's Dilemma")
- The Black Hole (1979) ISBN 0-345-28538-7, movie novelization
- Clash of the Titans (1981) ISBN 0-446-93675-8, movie novelization
- Outland (1981) ISBN 0-446-95829-8, movie novelization
- The Thing (1981) ISBN 0-553-20477-7, movie novelization
- Krull (1983) ISBN 0-446-30642-8, movie novelization
- The Last Starfighter (1984) ISBN 0-425-07255-X, movie novelization
- The Last Starfighter Storybook (1984) with Lynn Haney and Jonathan Betuel
- Shadowkeep (1984) ISBN 0-446-32553-8, also a computer game (1984)
- Starman (1984) ISBN 0-446-32598-8, movie novelization
- Pale Rider (1985) ISBN 0-446-32767-0, movie novelization
- Alien Nation (1988) ISBN 0-446-35264-0, movie novelization
- The Dig (1995) ISBN 0-446-51853-0, also a computer game
- The Chronicles of Riddick (2004) ISBN 0-345-46839-2, movie novelization

== Filmography ==
- Star Trek: The Motion Picture (1979, story)
- Welcome to Paradox (1998, story for episode "Our Lady of the Machine")
