= Voyage of the Unicorn =

2001 television film by Philip Spink

- Based on: Voyage of the Basset by James C. Christensen
- Teleplay by: Dan Levine
- Directed by: Philip Spink
- Starring: Beau Bridges; Chantal Conlin; Heather McEwen
- Music by: Jim Guttridge; Darryl Bennett
- Countries of origin: United States; Canada
- Original language: English

Production
- Producers: Matthew O'Connor; Michael O'Connor
- Cinematography: John Spooner
- Editor: Ron Yoshida
- Running time: 170 min.

Original release
- Release: March 2 – March 3, 2001

Voyage of the Unicorn is a 2001 television fantasy adventure film directed by Philip Spink and starring Beau Bridges, Chantal Conlin and Heather McEwen. The film is based on James C. Christensen's book Voyage of the Basset.

== Plot ==
In part one, Dr. Alan Aisling is an antiquities professor who has lost his wife and is about to lose his job when the new dean informs him of changes to the curriculum. His younger daughter Cassie daydreams about the mythical world her illustrator mother left behind in her drawings and annoys her older sister Miranda, who believes she needs to be more grounded.

That night, several monstrous trolls led by Skotos attack the house, and the family find themselves fleeing with an elf named Sebastian (who quickly develops a crush on Miranda) and a dwarf called Malachi. They board a mysterious ship called The Unicorn, capable of passing through the "Sensible" world, and into the "Landscape of Imagination". They sail to Faerie Isle, where a dryad directs them to the castle of Avalon, home of Oberon and Titania. There it is explained that they are prophesied to save the faeries and end darkness. They are given a quest to find the benevolent dragon that patrols the isles before the trolls do, as he who possesses the dragon shall rule the land. To help them, Titania gives gifts: for Cassie, a jewel that will always point out the way home; for Alan, a lens that will eliminate the glare of deception; but nothing for Miranda, who Tatiana believes has many gifts, though she does not use them.

Meanwhile, the trolls take a ship of their own and pursue the Unicorn. The winds carry the Unicorn to a seemingly deserted island, and the family goes ashore to search for the dragon. They find ruins which turn out to be a reflection of the palace of king Minos of Crete. Cassie chases a goat into a part of the ruins and gets lost in an underground labyrinth. Alan remembers the legend of the Minotaur, and he and Miranda gather stones to make a trail. Cassie runs into the Minotaur, who chases her further in. Trapped in a dead end, Cassie manages to befriend the Minotaur. He admits he is also lost and cannot leave. Cassie uses her jewel to point them out of the labyrinth. The Minotaur goes with them to protect Cassie. On their way back, they find the bones of the dragon.

They take the skull back to the ship. On the way back to Faerie Isle, Skotos' ship catches up to them. During the battle, the troll's main mast is destroyed and the Unicorn gets away, but only to sail into forbidden waters. Alan believes there is more they need to do, and that they should go ashore to the Ziggurat temple in the middle of the waters. Alan begins to examine the references to snakes and shields, and realizes that they are in a reflection of the temple of the Gorgon Medusa. The doors to the Ziggurat close, and the gorgon approaches. She encourages them to open their eyes and forget the pain of losing their mother as they turn to stone, something that affects Miranda strongly. Alan uses his lens to see how beautiful Medusa is. She lets them go in exchange for the lens. Cassie realizes how alone the gorgon is and offers to have her come with them. Hiding her face under a cloak, she accepts. As they leave, they are beset by the sphinx who demands Cassie answers her riddle. After she does, they welcome her to come with them, but she refuses.

Alan turns the lens into a pair of glasses so Medusa can look at people without turning them to stone. Both quickly begin to develop feelings for each other. The trolls attack once more, this time boarding the ship. Part One ends and Part Two begins with Alan beset by trolls at the ships prow, about to go overboard. Skotos chases the girls into the ship, where he finds the dragon skull. As the trolls retreat, they damage the Wunterlabe, the part of the ship that can take them home. One troll attacks, and Medusa tries to turn it to stone, but accidentally hits Malachi instead.

Skotos returns home with the dragon skull and unites the troll clans, but cannot summon its power because the skull was stolen. They begin to prepare for war against the faeries with help from Oberon. Meanwhile, the Unicorn floats for days, stranded while they try to fix Malachi's condition, as only he knows how to fix the Wunterlabe. Alan attempts magic spells, largely unsuccessful. Medusa suggests asking the College of Magical Knowledge, which they find inside a great book in the library. The professor inside the book advises them to find unicorn tears, which can turn stone back to flesh. To convince the unicorn to help them, they need a princess and a silver apple from a tree guarded by an ogre.

They find the tree, and pick several apples before the ogre attacks Alan. The girls' gowns magically change so they look like princesses. A unicorn appears and Miranda offers him an apple. The Unicorn leads the girls through the woods and plays with them before finally accepting the apple and healing Malachi.

Meanwhile, the trolls attack the faeries. The Unicorn returns to Faerie Isle to see it has been decimated. Oberon gives Skotos a potent magic to summon a sea serpent, only to have Skotos go back on his word to spare the faeries. Miranda dances, calling a mermaid to break Skotos' spell and put the serpent to sleep. Everyone decides they can't run from the fight and sail to Troll Island.

Once there, they split up to try to find the dragon skull. The trolls prepare to attack other islands and the "Sensible" world. While Cassie creates a distraction and gets caught, Alan, Miranda and the Minotaur get the dragon skull, which Miranda takes to Malachi. Cassie tries to convince the trolls to change, but Skotos wants none of what she says. Alan and the Minotaur come to rescue her. In the middle of battle, the sphinx grabs Cassie and flies her to the others near the ship. Miranda is chased by trolls to a swamp. Sebastian and Malachi try to draw the trolls off from the others.

The Minotaur, Sebastian, Malachi and Medusa are captured. Skotos tries to get the Minotaur to tell him where the dragon skull is, but when he refuses, Skotos dehorns him. Miranda blows her cover and shows them the skull to save him. She and Alan get separated, chased by Skotos. The Minotaur breaks free and destroys the troll's mine, causing the skull to be thrown into a pool of lava. Cassie grabs it before she, Miranda and Alan are surrounded. Cassie calls on the dragon's power, which resurrects it. The Dragon chases away all the trolls while the slaves free themselves. During the fighting, Miranda realizes her feelings for Sebastian and kisses him. The fighting over, everyone is ready to go home.

Finally returning home, Alan becomes the new dean, Medusa finds a way to their world, Miranda takes up music, Cassie continues drawing in her mother's portfolio, and the entire family finds a new enthusiasm for life.

== Cast ==
- Beau Bridges - Professor Alan Aisling
- Chantal Conlin - Cassandra "Cassie" Mary Aisling
- Heather McEwen - Miranda Aisling
- Mackenzie Gray - Skotos
- John DeSantis - Cratch
- Adrien Dorval - Mog
- Colin Heath - Malachi
- Kristian Ayre - Sebastian
- Mark Gibbon - Minotaur
- Kira Clavell - Medusa
- Kimberly Hawthorne - Sphinx
- Markus Parilo - Oberon
- Ocean Hellman - Titania
- Wanda Cannon - Lily
- C. Ernst Harth - Olaf the Ogre
- Mark Acheson - Kalgar
- Jay Brazeau - Mage

== Release ==
The film was released on a DVD with the TV film "The Old Curiosity Shop" (starring Peter Ustinov) in 2007. It was considered an "extra".

Both parts were released by Hallmark Entertainment as a single stand-alone feature on VHS.
