= Haney =

Haney may refer to:

- Haney (surname)

== Places ==
=== Canada ===
- Haney, British Columbia

=== United States ===
- Haney, Wisconsin, town
- Dallas, West Virginia, also called Haney
