= Star Wars: Episode II – Attack of the Clones (disambiguation) =

Star Wars: Episode II – Attack of the Clones is a 2002 film in the Star Wars saga. It may also refer to:

- Star Wars: Episode II – Attack of the Clones (video game), a video game adaptation of the film
- Star Wars: Episode II – Attack of the Clones (soundtrack), the soundtrack of the film
- Star Wars: Episode II – Attack of the Clones (novel), the novelization of the film

== See also ==
- Robot Chicken: Star Wars Episode II, a 2008 episode special of the comedy television series Robot Chicken
