= Glory Lane =

1987 novel by Alan Dean Foster

- First edition
- Author: Alan Dean Foster
- Cover artist: Jim Gurney
- Language: English
- Genre: Science fiction
- Publisher: Ace Books
- Publication date: August 1987
- Publication place: United States
- Media type: Print (Paperback)
- Pages: 295
- ISBN: 0-441-51664-5
- OCLC: 16392250

Glory Lane (1987) is a science fiction novel by American writer Alan Dean Foster. The book takes place outside of either of Foster’s two usual universes, Spellsinger and the Humanx Commonwealth.

== Plot summary ==
Teenage punk rock fan and high-school dropout Seeth (née Seth) and his older brother, geeky graduate student Kerwin, rescue a stranger from arrest at a bowling alley in their hometown of Albuquerque, New Mexico, only to discover that the cops are killer aliens and that the bowling ball the stranger carries is intelligent. Seeth, Kerwin and the stranger, quickly joined by a valley girl-type named Miranda, soon find themselves on the run, not just on the streets of Earth, but among the stars as well, and in the middle of an intergalactic battle for Izmir, the "bowling ball".

== Reception ==
Dean R. Lambe of Thrust wrote: "Between the covers is more than simple fluff, and a lot of honest laughs. You won't regret trading some of your beer money for this one."
