= The Man Who Used the Universe =

1983 novel by Alan Dean Foster

- First edition
- Author: Alan Dean Foster
- Cover artist: Jill Bauman
- Language: English
- Genre: science fiction
- Publisher: Nelson Doubleday
- Publication date: 1983
- Publication place: United States
- Pages: 320
- ISBN: 978-1587150494

The Man Who Used the Universe is a science fiction novel by Alan Dean Foster published in 1983.

== Plot summary ==
The Man Who Used the Universe is a novel in which Kees vaan Loo-Macklin rises from being an illegal to reach a position of high power.

== Reception ==
Ken Ramstead reviewed The Man Who Used the Universe in Ares Magazine #17 and commented that "Foster demands much credulity from his readers. But he also delivers much in return."

== Reviews ==
- Review by C. J. Henderson [as by Chris Henderson] (1983) in Dragon magazine, November 1983
- Review by Tom Easton (1984) in Analog Science Fiction/Science Fact, February 1984
- Science Fiction Review
