= Into the Out Of =

1986 novel by Alan Dean Foster

- Author: Alan Dean Foster
- Language: English
- Genre: Science fiction, horror
- Publisher: Warner Books
- Publication date: 1986
- Publication place: United States
- Media type: Print (hardback)
- Pages: 384
- ISBN: 978-1-58715-047-0
- OCLC: 47680845

Into the Out Of (1986) is a horror-science fiction novel by American writer Alan Dean Foster.

== Plot summary ==
The Maasai people become aware that a global crisis is approaching. Malevolent, unearthly creatures called shetani, which inhabit another dimension the Maasai know as the “Out Of” (because all things, such as humans, animals and plants, originally came "out of" it), are finding their way into the world. They are fomenting trouble between the superpowers, intent on causing mischief up to and including war. If not prevented, the barriers between the two dimensions will be breached and uncountable hordes of shetani will overrun the world, destroying all life.

Olkeloki, a Maasai elder, comes to Washington, D.C. to warn the US President and seek help. He encounters Joshua Oak, a disenchanted FBI agent, and Merry Sharrow, a shy and unfulfilled call centre worker. He is convinced that they are the key people he has been seeking, and his persuasion, coupled with several dangerous encounters with shetani, convince them to return with him to Africa, where they join in Maasai attempts to hold back the shetani. Eventually, Olkeloki takes Merry and Oak into the Out Of, where, with their help, he performs a ritual which seals the breach between dimensions, sacrificing his own supernatural powers in the process. All three return to this world, where the shetani’s tricks have ended and the diplomatic crisis is receding, and Oak and Merry realize they have found what they have been looking for in each other.
