= The Approaching Storm =

2002 novel by Alan Dean Foster

- First edition
- Editor: Shelly Shapiro
- Author: Alan Dean Foster
- Cover artist: Steven D. Anderson
- Language: English
- Series: Canon C
- Genre: Science fiction
- Publisher: Del Rey
- Publication date: Hardcover: January 29, 2002; Paperback: January 1, 2003
- Publication place: United States
- Media type: Hardcover & Paperback
- Pages: Hardcover: 352; Paperback: 384
- ISBN: 0-345-44300-4
- Preceded by: Outbound Flight
- Followed by: Star Wars Episode II: Attack of the Clones

The Approaching Storm is a science fiction novel, set in the fictional Star Wars universe, by American writer Alan Dean Foster. It follows Obi-Wan Kenobi and Anakin Skywalker as they are sent to a planet to settle a dispute as growing unrest threatens the Galactic Republic's stability, leading to the events of Star Wars: Episode II – Attack of the Clones.

== Background and release ==
Alan Dean Foster had previously penned the 1976 novelization of the original Star Wars film and the follow-up book Splinter of the Mind's Eye (1978). Released a few months before (and set shortly before the events of) the film Star Wars: Episode II – Attack of the Clones (2002), The Approaching Storm depicts the increasing separatism which triggers the Clone Wars. The events which it depicts are passingly mentioned in an early scene of Attack of the Clones.

The hardcover book was released on January 29, 2002, with a mass-market paperback following in January 2003. The book also includes a 12-page preview of Tatooine Ghost (2003).

== Plot ==
The Galactic Republic is decaying, even under the leadership of Supreme Chancellor Palpatine, who was elected to save the galaxy from collapsing. On the tiny but strategic planet of Ansion, a powerful faction is on the verge of joining the growing Separatist movement. The urban dwellers wish to expand into the prairies outside their cities – the ancestral territory of the fierce, independent Ansion nomads. If their demands are not met, they will secede – an act that could jump-start a chain reaction of withdrawal and rebellion by other worlds of the Republic.

At the Chancellor's request, the Jedi Council sends Kenobi and fellow Jedi Luminara Unduli to resolve the conflict and negotiate with the elusive nomads. Undaunted, Kenobi and Unduli, along with their Padawans Skywalker and Barriss Offee, set out across the wilderness. Many perils lie waiting to trap them. The Jedi will have to fulfill near-impossible tasks, befriend wary strangers, and influence two great armies to complete their quest, stalked all the while by an enemy sworn to see the negotiations collapse and the mission fail.

== Legacy ==
In 2014, following Disney's acquisition of Lucasfilm, spin-off books like The Approaching Storm were rebranded 'Legends' and declared non-canon to the franchise to clear the slate for the Star Wars sequel trilogy.
