= The Mocking Program =

2002 novel by Alan Dean Foster

- Author: Alan Dean Foster
- Cover artist: John Blackford
- Language: English
- Genre: Science fiction, Detective fiction
- Publisher: Aspect
- Publication date: August 2002
- Publication place: United States
- Media type: Print (hardback & paperback)
- Pages: 240 pp
- ISBN: 0-446-52774-2
- OCLC: 49226002
- Dewey Decimal: 813/.54 21
- LC Class: PS3556.O756 M63 2002

The Mocking Program is a science fiction novel by American author Alan Dean Foster, published in 2002.

== Plot ==
A hard-boiled police procedural set in a megalopolis called the Montezuma Strip, which stretches along the old U.S.-Mexican border. When police inspector Angel Cardenas investigates the case of a male corpse found with most of its internal organs missing, the victim turns out to have had two identities - one as a local executive, the other as a Texas businessman. The plot thickens when the victim's booby-trapped house nearly kills Cardenas and his partner. The author makes use of a vast array of futuristic elements; notably, sapient apes led by gorillas and intelligent rogue computers that commit computer crimes.

While the book does not state this, this is a continuation of a series of short stories featuring the same main character, written by Foster and initially published in genre magazines under the pen-name of James Lawson, and then collected under his own name in the Warner book Montezuma Strip (1995).
