= Interlopers (novel) =

2001 novel by Alan Dean Foster

- First edition
- Author: Alan Dean Foster
- Cover artist: Jerry Vanderstelt
- Language: English
- Genre: Science fiction
- Publisher: Ace Books
- Publication date: May 1, 2001
- Publication place: United States
- Media type: Print (Paperback)
- Pages: 313 pp (first edition, paperback)
- ISBN: 0-441-00847-X (first edition, paperback)
- OCLC: 46851604
- LC Class: CPB Box no. 1835 vol. 14

Interlopers is a 2001 science fiction novel by American writer Alan Dean Foster.

The story centers on Cody Westcott, a young archaeologist, who returns from a dig at Apachetarimac having studied the Chachapoyansthat race. In an attempt to reconstruct an ancient potion whose ingredients he discovers in the dig, his friend is murdered and he ends up drinking the only sample. He discovers that he can "see" strange creatures inhabiting the world, and that these creatures harm humans and cause feelings of hate and anger upon which they feed and multiply. These "Interlopers" or "Those Who Abide" also realize he can see them at the same time, and begin to conspire against him in order to stop his interruption of their feeding. They go so far as infesting his wife with numerous powerful Interlopers, and Cody must ally with an ancient society and visit several sites of mythical power in order to free her and bring a halt to the Interlopers' plans.

Interlopers has also been produced as an audio book, released on CD in November 2004 by Buzzy Multimedia, in an unabridged edition narrated by Ben Browder.

== Reception ==
Don D'Amassa, in his review for Science Fiction Chronicle said "I've enjoyed almost every book I've ever read by Foster, so I sat down with this new one expecting an enjoyable read. For a while, it was exactly that, but then the internal logic of the story just fell apart for me."
