= Heather McEwen =

Canadian actress (born 1984)

- Born: 4 February 1984 (age 42); Vancouver, British Columbia

Heather McEwen (born 4 February 1984) is a Canadian actress. She began acting professionally at the age of 12, and in 2002 was nominated for a Leo Award as Best Supporting Performance in a Feature-Length Drama for Voyage of the Unicorn.

She studied Classical Drama and English Literature at The University of Toronto, Ontario, Canada, and at Manchester University in the United Kingdom. She is a registered yoga teacher with Yoga Alliance International.

Film and television
Year	Title	Role	Notes
1998	The Baby Dance	Patricia	TV movie
1999	The Adventures of Shirley Holmes	Elise	"The Case of the Hidden Heart"
1999	Convergence	Young Girl	
2001	Voyage of the Unicorn	Miranda Aisling	TV movie
2002	The Twilight Zone	New Tess	"Upgrade"
2003	John Doe	Lisa Burrows	"Family Man"
2004	The L Word	Sharon at 17	"Listen Up"
2005	Young Blades	Princess Tatiana	"The Girl from Upper Gaborski"
2006	Orpheus	Patty's Friend #1	TV movie
2006	John Tucker Must Die	Freshman Girl #3 (uncredited)	

== Awards and nominations ==
Year	Award	Category	Title of work	Result
2002	Leo Award	Best Supporting Performance by a Female: Feature Length Drama	Voyage of the Unicorn	Nominated
