= Voyage of the Basset =

1996 book by James C. Christensen

- Author: James C. Christensen
- Publisher: Artisian
- Publication date: 1996

Voyage of the Basset is an illustrated children's book published in 1996. It was written and illustrated by James C. Christensen in collaboration with Renwick St. James and Alan Dean Foster. It is about a widowed Victorian era professor, Algernon Aisling, his two daughters, Miranda and Cassandra, and their adventure on a ship called the Basset.

== Plot summary ==
Miranda is sixteen and concerned with being sensible, while Cassandra, nine years and eleven months, likes and believes in magical things. Miranda is outnumbered because Professor Aisling lectures on mythology and legends at his university, takes Cassandra's side. Majority opinion at the university disparages Asiling's views, Mr. Bilgewallow, in particular.

As Aisling and his daughters walk along the river, they counter a small ship with a crew of dwarfs and gremlins. One of the dwarfs introduces himself as Malachi, captain of H.M.S. Basset. He says that it is Professor Aisling's ship, conjured from his wishes and ready to sail on the "tides of inspiration". Aisling and Cassandra waste no time in going aboard. Miranda needs a bit more coaxing.

The Aislings meet a number of creatures from mythology that join them on board the ship. They encounter an island of fairies, ruled by Oberon and Titania. The manticore, who guarded the entrance of the fairy king and queen, joins them along with a sphinx. A number of mythical creatures join the crew and meet others, including a unicorn and trolls and visit a Wonderfull College of Magical Knowledge.

Aisling still wishes to prove the existence of mythical creatueres to Bilegewallow, and to this end, gets in trouble with trolls after he steals the skull of a dragon. Aisling goes back on this and returns the skull to a living dragon, feeling there is no need to prove existence of magical creatures. The Professor seeks an island to leave all the magical creatures where they can live together. All ends happily.

== Controversy ==
One of Christensen's mermaid images that sparked controversy in Davis County, Utah

The Voyage of the Basset was the source of controversy in 2006. Concerned by one painting which she regarded as suggestive, a resident of Bountiful, Utah, demanded that the book be removed from circulation from the young adult section of the Davis County Library in nearby Farmington. The Davis County Library Board voted to keep the book in circulation in the young adult section.

== Adaptation ==
The 2001 TV movie Voyage of the Unicorn is based on this book. The adaptation is set in the modern era, with certain elements of the book being altered or removed due to budgetary constraints.

== Sequel series ==
The book Islands in the Sky by Tanith Lee is the first of a series of sequels to the original story. The other books are The Raven Queen by Ellen Steiber and Terri Windling (October 1999), Journey to Otherwhere by Sherwood Smith (August 2000), Thor's Hammer by Will Shetterly (December 2000), and Fire Bird by Mary Frances Zambreno (June 2001).
