= Haney (surname) =

Haney is a surname. Notable people with the surname include:

- Anne Haney, actress
- Bob Haney, comic book writer
- Carol Haney, dancer
- Chris Haney, Canadian co-creator of popular board game Trivial Pursuit
- David Haney, composer, pianist
- Daryl Haney, actor, screenwriter
- Devin Haney, professional boxer
- Enoch Kelly Haney, politician
- Eric L. Haney, security consultant
- Francis J. Heney, attorney, district attorney, Arizona Attorney General, and Assistant U.S. Attorney for Oregon
- Fred Haney, baseball player
- Hank Haney, golf instructor
- Henry Ryan Haney, politician
- Jack Haney, first person to drive across Canada in an automobile
- Kevin Haney, Academy Award winning make-up artist
- Larry Haney, baseball player & coach
- Lee Haney, bodybuilder
- Lewis Henry Haney, economist
- Lynn Haney, biographer
- Melissa Haney (b. 1981), first female Inuk pilot to reach the rank of captain
- Milton L. Haney, recipient of Medal of Honor
- Todd Haney, baseball player

Fictional characters:

- Mr. Haney, fictional TV character
