= Spellsinger (novel) =

1983 fantasy novel by Alan Dean Foster

- Spellsinger book cover
- Author: Alan Dean Foster
- Cover artist: Kevin Johnson
- Language: English
- Genre: Fantasy
- Publisher: Phantasia Press
- Publication date: 1983
- Publication place: United States
- Media type: Print
- ISBN: 0-932096-22-0
- OCLC: 9615217
- LC Class: CPB Box no. 2962 vol. 22
- Followed by: The Hour of the Gate

Spellsinger (1983) is a fantasy novel by American writer Alan Dean Foster. The book follows the adventures of Jonathan Thomas Meriweather, who is transported from our world into a land of talking animals and magic. It is the first in the Spellsinger series.

The audiobook was read by a full cast.

== Plot summary ==
In a world of sentient animals and humans, the hardheaded tortoise wizard Clothahump searches across the dimensions for another kind of wizard to help defeat the looming threat posed by the armies of the Plated Folk. What he gets is Jonathan Thomas Meriweather, law student, part-time would-be rock guitarist and janitor, who finds that with the use of a unique instrument called a duar, he can perform magic by playing and choosing from his well-worn repertoire of rock songs. Jon-Tom, as he is called in Clothahump's world, quickly discovers that while he might be able to use magic with his music making, the results are often unpredictable and usually humorous. Ever searching for a way to get back to Earth, Jon-Tom takes up the battle to save this world.

== Critical reception ==
The novel was reviewed on Early Bird Books, where it was commended for its "welcome absurdity" and "page-turning adventure".
