= Star Wars: The Force Awakens (novel) =

2016 novel by Alan Dean Foster

- Author: Alan Dean Foster
- Audio read by: Marc Thompson
- Language: English
- Series: Star Wars
- Genre: Science fiction
- Publisher: Del Rey Books
- Publication date: E-book: December 18, 2015; Hardcover: January 5, 2016
- Publication place: United States
- Media type: Print (hardcover & paperback)
- Pages: Hardcover: 268
- ISBN: 978-1-101-96549-8

Star Wars: The Force Awakens is the novelization of the 2015 film of the same name. The author, Alan Dean Foster, also wrote Star Wars: From the Adventures of Luke Skywalker, the 1976 novelization of the first Star Wars film.

== Development ==
Asked to write the novelization by Shelly Shapiro of Del Rey Books, Foster was given access to the screenplay of the film, along with stills from the film of characters and sets.

Foster wanted to develop a romance between Rey and Finn, which he thought was implied in the film. He later stated, "I expected to see that developed further in Episode VIII." He also expressed his dissatisfaction with the latter film, saying that it prompted him to write a treatment for Episode IX, "attempting in that storyline to explain a lot of the really silly things that happened in Episode VIII." However, he admitted that he "never expected Disney to do anything with [it]." (Note: Amongst Foster's ideas for Episode IX were that Rey became part-droid to cure a brain disease (explaining her strength in the Force) and that at the end, "there's a big battle on Coruscant with the Emperor's clones. ... Luke is dying under a tree, and Rey comes out. And Luke's last words are 'Aunt Beru.'" ComicBookMovie.com opines that "that doesn't sound any better than what The Rise of Skywalker delivered.")

== Differences between the novel and the film ==
The novelization includes additional scenes and dialogue. These include:

- A prologue featuring an excerpt from the "Journal of the Whills", a fictional journal first mentioned in Foster's first Star Wars novelization.
- Early in the novel, a sequence with Leia reveals the origin of the main factions in the film: the Resistance, the New Republic and the First Order.
- A section revealing how Poe Dameron escapes from the crashed TIE fighter and leaves Jakku.
- A sequence where Rey and Chewbacca encounter Unkar Plutt on Takodana.

== Publication history ==
To avoid spoilers caused by the book being released before the movie, the hardcover release was delayed until January 5, 2016. The e-book was released on December 18, 2015. The book was a #1 New York Times best seller.

== Reception ==
Den of Geek said: "Stripped of its visuals and the charisma of its actors, The Force Awakens is a drier script than it was a film." Kirkus Reviews wrote: "Foster keeps the prose steady if a bit workmanlike throughout, but there are a few nose dives into questionably florid prose [...] Ultimately, it's the original story and characters from the film that make the book worth reading rather than Foster's contributions."
