= The Light Years Beneath My Feet =

2006 novel by Alan Dean Foster

The Light-Years Beneath My Feet
- First edition
- Author: Alan Dean Foster
- Language: English
- Series: Taken Trilogy
- Genre: Science Fiction, Space Opera
- Publisher: Del Ray, Penguin Books
- Publication date: May 30, 2006
- Publication place: United States
- Pages: 256
- ISBN: 0-345-46128-2
- Preceded by: Lost And Found
- Followed by: The Candle Of Distant Earth

The Light-years beneath my feet is book written by American author Alan Dean Foster, who is an author of more than 20 fantasy novels and books.The book was published in 2006 by Penguin Books in US. The book is part of the Taken Trilogy being the second part of the series. It was preceded by "Lost and Found" published in 2004.

Just like its predecessor Lost and Found , this book also features the protagonist Mark Walker and a talking dog like alien George. According to Foster himself this book can be read without needing to read its prequel, something he achieved by writing style, and introducing new readers without much needed information dumps. Though many fictional races like the villainous Vilenjii and the accommodating Sessrimanthe, that were previously introduced in Lost and Found are still to be found in the series, they don't have any major impact on the story as a whole.

== Summary ==
The story continues from its predecessor, where the protagonist Marcus Walker managed to escape from his abductors the villainous Vilenjii along with other alien escapes - George the talking dog, the squid-like Sque, and gigantic Braouk. Now living a comfortable life as a chef on a new planet with the Sessrimanthe, all Marcus and his fellow escapees want is to return to their respective home planets but the chances were looking bleak. It is at this point that Marcus takes up the complex art of "Galactic Cuisine" which makes up for the most unique and interesting read in the entire book. Through these cooking escapades, he eventually meets the willowy Alien Viyv-Pym from the Niyyuu race with whom he gets romantically involved. He follows Viyv along with his companions to her home planet where Marcus founds himself embroiled in their local politics. The Light-Years Beneath My Feet continues the saga of Mark Walker and George in an unexpected direction.
