= List of accolades received by Star Wars: The Force Awakens =

Star Wars: The Force Awakens accolades
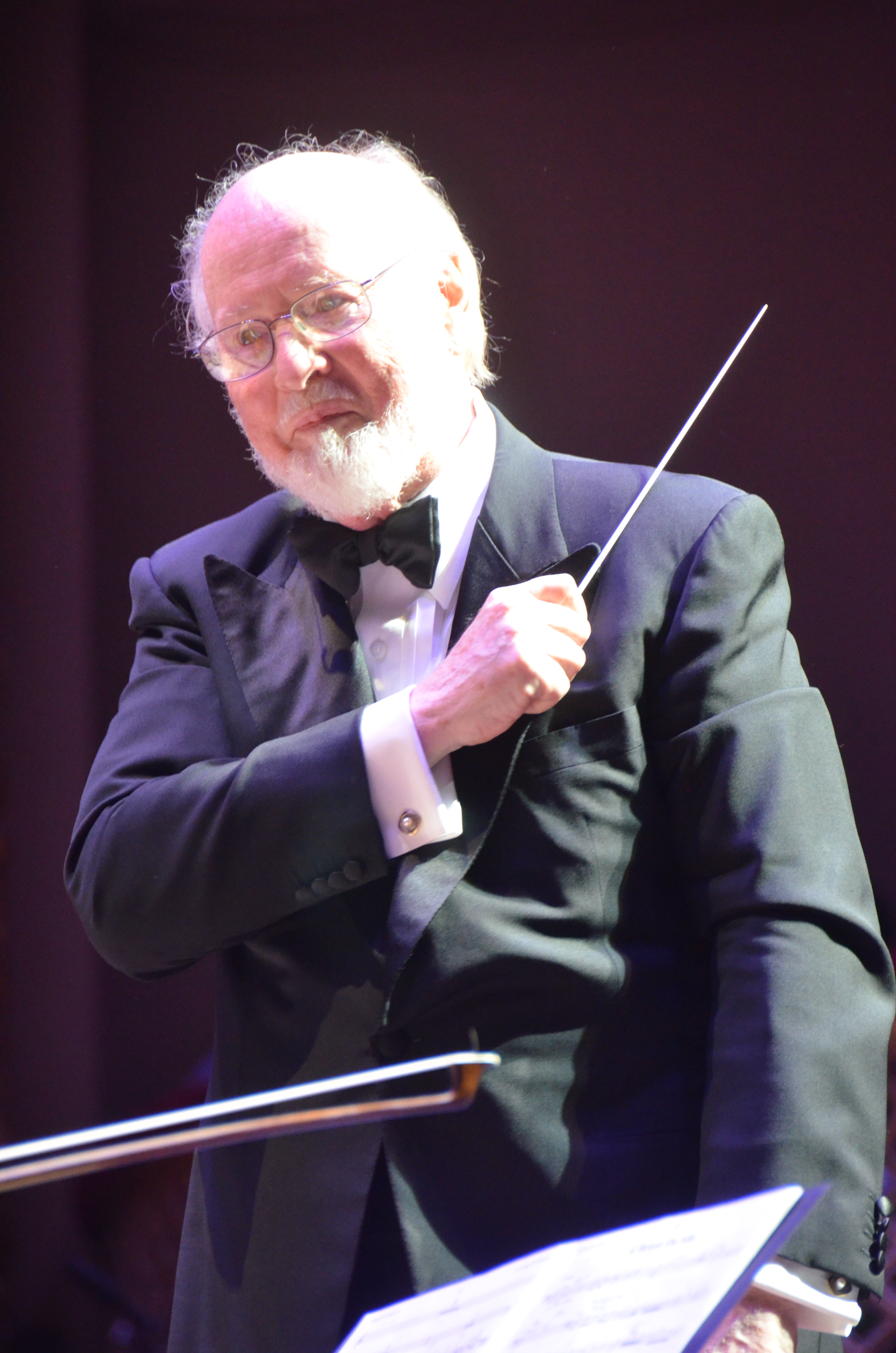
- Composer John Williams received multiple accolades for his work in the film.
Awards and nominations
Award	Wins	Nominations
3D Creative Arts Awards	2	2
Academy Awards	0	5
Alliance of Women Film Journalists Awards	0	2
American Cinema Editors Awards	0	1
American Film Institute Awards	1	1
American Music Awards	0	1
Art Directors Guild Awards	1	1
Artios Awards	0	1
Bodil Awards	0	1
British Academy Children's Awards	0	1
British Academy Film Awards	1	4
Cinema Audio Society Awards	0	1
Costume Designers Guild Awards	0	1
Critics' Choice Movie Awards	0	1
Dragon Awards	0	1
Empire Awards	5	9
Evening Standard British Film Awards	1	1
Florida Film Critics Circle Awards	2	3
Golden Reel Awards	1	3
Golden Trailer Awards	2	7
Grammy Awards	1	1
Hollywood Post Alliance Awards	0	1
Hugo Awards	0	1
ICG Publicists Awards	1	1
International Film Music Critics Association Awards	3	3
Japan Academy Film Prize	0	1
Make-Up Artists and Hair Stylists Guild Awards	0	1
MTV Movie Awards	4	11
Nebula Awards	0	1
Nickelodeon Kids' Choice Awards	1	3
Santa Barbara International Film Festival Awards	1	1
Saturn Awards	8	15
Screen Nation Film and Television Awards	1	2
Teen Choice Awards	2	7
Visual Effects Society Awards	4	7
World Soundtrack Awards	0	1

Totals (Note: Certain award groups do not simply award one winner. They acknowledge several different recipients, have runners-up, and have third place. Since this is a specific recognition and is different from losing an award, runner-up mentions are considered wins in this award tally. For simplification and to avoid errors, each award in this list has been presumed to have had a prior nomination.)
- Wins: 40
- Nominations: 104

Star Wars: The Force Awakens (also known as Star Wars: Episode VII – The Force Awakens) is a 2015 American epic space opera film produced, co-written, and directed by J. J. Abrams. The sequel to Return of the Jedi (1983), it is the seventh film in the "Skywalker Saga". Set thirty years after Return of the Jedi, The Force Awakens follows Rey, Finn, Poe Dameron, and Han Solo's search for Luke Skywalker and their fight in the Resistance, led by General Leia Organa and veterans of the Rebel Alliance, against Kylo Ren and the First Order, a successor to the Galactic Empire. The ensemble cast includes Harrison Ford, Mark Hamill, Carrie Fisher, Adam Driver, Daisy Ridley, John Boyega, Oscar Isaac, Lupita Nyong'o, Andy Serkis, Domhnall Gleeson, Anthony Daniels, Peter Mayhew, and Max von Sydow.

Star Wars: The Force Awakens premiered in Hollywood, Los Angeles, on December 14, 2015, and was released in the United States on December 18. Produced on a budget of $447 million, The Force Awakens grossed $2.071 billion worldwide, breaking numerous box office records, and finishing its theatrical run as the highest-grossing film of 2015 and the third-highest-grossing film of all time. On the review aggregator website Rotten Tomatoes, the film holds an approval rating of 93% based on 449 reviews.

Star Wars: The Force Awakens garnered awards and nominations in various categories with particular recognition for its visual effects, musical score, and sound effects. It garnered five nominations at the 88th Academy Awards, including Best Visual Effects. At the 69th British Academy Film Awards, the film was nominated for Best Original Music, Best Sound, and Best Production Design; and won Best Special Visual Effects. The film received a nomination for Best Picture at the 21st Critics' Choice Awards. In 2016, composer John Williams won Best Score Soundtrack for Visual Media at the Grammy Awards' 59th ceremony. It won eight of fifteen nominations at the 42nd Saturn Awards. In addition, the American Film Institute selected The Force Awakens as one of the top-ten films of 2015.

== Accolades ==
Accolades received by Star Wars: The Force Awakens
Award	Date of ceremony	Category	Recipient(s)	Result	Ref.
3D Creative Arts Awards	February 10, 2016	Best Feature Film – Live Action	Star Wars: The Force Awakens	Won	
3D Creative Arts Awards	February 10, 2016	Best 2D to 3D Conversion	Star Wars: The Force Awakens	Won	
Academy Awards	February 28, 2016	Best Film Editing	Maryann Brandon and Mary Jo Markey	Nominated	
Academy Awards	February 28, 2016	Best Original Score	John Williams	Nominated	
Academy Awards	February 28, 2016	Best Sound Editing	Matthew Wood and David Acord	Nominated	
Academy Awards	February 28, 2016	Best Sound Mixing	Andy Nelson, Christopher Scarabosio, and Stuart Wilson	Nominated	
Academy Awards	February 28, 2016	Best Visual Effects	Roger Guyett, Patrick Tubach, Neal Scanlan, and Chris Corbould	Nominated	
Alliance of Women Film Journalists Awards	January 12, 2016	Best Female Action Star	Daisy Ridley	Nominated	
Alliance of Women Film Journalists Awards	January 12, 2016	Best Breakthrough Performance	Daisy Ridley	Nominated	
American Cinema Editors Awards	January 29, 2016	Best Edited Feature Film – Dramatic	Maryann Brandon and Mary Jo Markey	Nominated	
American Film Institute Awards	December 16, 2015	Top 10 Films of the Year	Star Wars: The Force Awakens	Won (Note: This award does not have a single winner, but recognizes multiple films.)	
American Music Awards	November 20, 2016	Top Soundtrack	Star Wars: The Force Awakens	Nominated	
Art Directors Guild Awards	January 31, 2016	Excellence in Production Design for a Fantasy Film	Rick Carter and Darren Gilford	Nominated	
Artios Awards	January 21, 2016	Big Budget – Drama	April Webster, Nina Gold, Alyssa Weisberg, and Jessica Sherman	Nominated	
Bodil Awards	March 5, 2016	Best American Film	Star Wars: The Force Awakens	Nominated	
British Academy Children's Awards	November 20, 2016	Feature Film	Star Wars: The Force Awakens	Nominated	
British Academy Film Awards	February 14, 2016	Best Original Music	John Williams	Nominated	
British Academy Film Awards	February 14, 2016	Best Sound	Matthew Wood, David Acord, Andy Nelson, Christopher Scarabosio, and Stuart Wilson	Nominated	
British Academy Film Awards	February 14, 2016	Best Production Design	Rick Carter, Darren Gilford, and Lee Sandales	Nominated	
British Academy Film Awards	February 14, 2016	Best Special Visual Effects	Roger Guyett, Neal Scanlan, Chris Corbould, and Paul Kavanagh	Won	
Cinema Audio Society Awards	February 20, 2016	Outstanding Achievement in Sound Mixing in a Motion Picture – Live Action	Andy Nelson, Christopher Scarabosio, Stuart Wilson, Shawn Murphy, Charleen Richards, and Chris Manning	Nominated	
Costume Designers Guild Awards	February 23, 2016	Excellence in Fantasy Film	Michael Kaplan	Nominated	
Critics' Choice Movie Awards	January 17, 2016	Best Picture	Star Wars: The Force Awakens	Nominated	
Dragon Awards	September 2–5, 2016	Best Science Fiction or Fantasy Movie	Star Wars: The Force Awakens	Nominated	
Empire Awards	March 20, 2016	Best Film	Star Wars: The Force Awakens	Nominated	
Empire Awards	March 20, 2016	Best Sci-Fi/Fantasy Film	Star Wars: The Force Awakens	Won	
Empire Awards	March 20, 2016	Best Director	J. J. Abrams	Won	
Empire Awards	March 20, 2016	Best Male Newcomer	John Boyega	Won	
Empire Awards	March 20, 2016	Best Female Newcomer	Daisy Ridley	Won	
Empire Awards	March 20, 2016	Best Costume Design	Star Wars: The Force Awakens	Nominated	
Empire Awards	March 20, 2016	Best Make-Up and Hairstyling	Star Wars: The Force Awakens	Nominated	
Empire Awards	March 20, 2016	Best Visual Effects	Star Wars: The Force Awakens	Won	
Empire Awards	March 20, 2016	Best Production Design	Star Wars: The Force Awakens	Nominated	
Evening Standard British Film Awards	February 7, 2016	Blockbuster of the Year	Star Wars: The Force Awakens	Won	
Florida Film Critics Circle Awards	December 23, 2015	Best Score	Star Wars: The Force Awakens	Nominated	
Florida Film Critics Circle Awards	December 23, 2015	Best Visual Effects	Star Wars: The Force Awakens	Runner-up	
Florida Film Critics Circle Awards	December 23, 2015	Pauline Kael Breakout Award	Daisy Ridley	Won	
Golden Reel Awards	February 27, 2016	Outstanding Achievement in Sound Editing – Feature Underscore	Paul Apelgren	Won	
Golden Reel Awards	February 27, 2016	Outstanding Achievement in Sound Editing – Sound Effects and Foley for Feature Film	Matthew Wood	Nominated	
Golden Reel Awards	February 27, 2016	Outstanding Achievement in Sound Editing – Dialogue and ADR for Feature Film	Matthew Wood	Nominated	
Golden Trailer Awards	May 4, 2016	Best Fantasy Adventure	"Lessons" (Disney In-house)	Won	
Golden Trailer Awards	May 4, 2016	Best Music	"Lessons" (Disney In-house)	Nominated	
Golden Trailer Awards	May 4, 2016	Best Fantasy Adventure TV Spot	"Name" (Disney In-house)	Nominated	
Golden Trailer Awards	May 4, 2016	Best Action Poster	"One Sheet" (Lindeman & Associates)	Won	
Golden Trailer Awards	May 4, 2016	Best Billboard	"Rey" (Lindeman & Associates)	Nominated	
Golden Trailer Awards	May 4, 2016	Best Fantasy/Adventure Poster	Star Wars: The Force Awakens (Lindeman & Associates)	Nominated	
Golden Trailer Awards	May 4, 2016	Best Wildposts (Teaser Campaign)	Star Wars: The Force Awakens (Lindeman & Associates)	Nominated	
Grammy Awards	February 12, 2017	Best Score Soundtrack for Visual Media	John Williams	Won	
Hollywood Post Alliance Awards	November 17, 2016	Outstanding Visual Effects – Feature Film	Jay Cooper, Yanick Dusseault, Rick Hankins, Carlos Munoz, and Polly Ing (Industrial Light & Magic)	Nominated	
Hugo Awards	August 20, 2016	Best Dramatic Presentation, Long Form	Lawrence Kasdan, J. J. Abrams, and Michael Arndt	Nominated	
ICG Publicists Awards	February 26, 2016	Maxwell Weinberg Publicists Showmanship Motion Picture Award	Star Wars: The Force Awakens	Won	
International Film Music Critics Association Awards	February 18, 2016	Film Score of the Year	John Williams	Won	
International Film Music Critics Association Awards	February 18, 2016	Best Original Score for a Fantasy/Science Fiction/Horror Film	John Williams	Won	
International Film Music Critics Association Awards	February 18, 2016	Film Music Composition of the Year	John Williams for "The Jedi Steps and Finale"	Won	
Japan Academy Film Prize	March 3, 2017	Outstanding Foreign Language Film	Star Wars: The Force Awakens	Nominated	
Make-Up Artists and Hair Stylists Guild Awards	February 20, 2016	Best Special Make-Up Effects in a Feature-Length Motion Picture	Neal Scanlan	Nominated	
MTV Movie Awards	April 10, 2016	Movie of the Year	Star Wars: The Force Awakens	Won	
MTV Movie Awards	April 10, 2016	Best Female Performance	Daisy Ridley	Nominated	
MTV Movie Awards	April 10, 2016	Breakthrough Performance	Daisy Ridley	Won	
MTV Movie Awards	April 10, 2016	Breakthrough Performance	John Boyega	Nominated	
MTV Movie Awards	April 10, 2016	Best Fight	Daisy Ridley vs. Adam Driver	Nominated	
MTV Movie Awards	April 10, 2016	Best Villain	Adam Driver	Won	
MTV Movie Awards	April 10, 2016	Best Action Performance	John Boyega	Nominated	
MTV Movie Awards	April 10, 2016	Best Virtual Performance	Andy Serkis	Won	
MTV Movie Awards	April 10, 2016	Best Virtual Performance	Lupita Nyong'o	Nominated	
MTV Movie Awards	April 10, 2016	Ensemble Cast	Star Wars: The Force Awakens	Nominated	
MTV Movie Awards	April 10, 2016	Best Hero	Daisy Ridley	Nominated	
Nebula Awards	May 14, 2016	Ray Bradbury Nebula Award for Outstanding Dramatic Presentation	Lawrence Kasdan, J. J. Abrams, and Michael Arndt	Nominated	
Nickelodeon Kids' Choice Awards	March 12, 2016	Favorite Movie	Star Wars: The Force Awakens	Won	
Nickelodeon Kids' Choice Awards	March 12, 2016	Favorite Movie Actor	John Boyega	Nominated	
Nickelodeon Kids' Choice Awards	March 12, 2016	Favorite Movie Actress	Daisy Ridley	Nominated	
Santa Barbara International Film Festival Awards	February 10, 2016	Variety Artisans Award – Visual Effects	Patrick Tubach	Won	
Saturn Awards	June 22, 2016	Best Science Fiction Film	Star Wars: The Force Awakens	Won	
Saturn Awards	June 22, 2016	Best Director	J. J. Abrams	Nominated	
Saturn Awards	June 22, 2016	Best Writing	Lawrence Kasdan, J. J. Abrams, and Michael Arndt	Won	
Saturn Awards	June 22, 2016	Best Actor	John Boyega	Nominated	
Saturn Awards	June 22, 2016	Best Actor	Harrison Ford	Won	
Saturn Awards	June 22, 2016	Best Actress	Daisy Ridley	Nominated	
Saturn Awards	June 22, 2016	Best Supporting Actor	Adam Driver	Won	
Saturn Awards	June 22, 2016	Best Supporting Actress	Carrie Fisher	Nominated	
Saturn Awards	June 22, 2016	Best Supporting Actress	Lupita Nyong'o	Nominated	
Saturn Awards	June 22, 2016	Best Music	John Williams	Nominated	
Saturn Awards	June 22, 2016	Best Editing	Maryann Brandon and Mary Jo Markey	Won	
Saturn Awards	June 22, 2016	Best Production Design	Rick Carter and Darren Gilford	Nominated	
Saturn Awards	June 22, 2016	Best Costume Design	Michael Kaplan	Nominated	
Saturn Awards	June 22, 2016	Best Make-up	Neal Scanlan	Won	
Saturn Awards	June 22, 2016	Best Special Effects	Roger Guyett, Patrick Tubach, Neal Scanlan, and Chris Corbould	Won	
Screen Nation Film and Television Awards	March 19, 2016	Male Performance in Film	John Boyega	Won	
Screen Nation Film and Television Awards	March 19, 2016	Favourite International Movie (made by or featuring British talent)	Star Wars: The Force Awakens (John Boyega)	Nominated	
Teen Choice Awards	July 31, 2016	Choice Movie: Sci-Fi/Fantasy	Star Wars: The Force Awakens	Nominated	
Teen Choice Awards	July 31, 2016	Choice Movie Actress: Sci-Fi/Fantasy	Daisy Ridley	Nominated	
Teen Choice Awards	July 31, 2016	Choice Movie: Villain	Adam Driver	Won	
Teen Choice Awards	July 31, 2016	Choice Movie: Chemistry	Daisy Ridley and John Boyega	Nominated	
Teen Choice Awards	July 31, 2016	Choice Movie: Hissy Fit	Adam Driver	Nominated	
Teen Choice Awards	July 31, 2016	Choice Movie: Breakout Star	Daisy Ridley	Won	
Teen Choice Awards	July 31, 2016	Choice Movie: Breakout Star	John Boyega	Nominated	
Visual Effects Society Awards	February 2, 2016	Outstanding Visual Effects in a Photoreal Feature	Roger Guyett, Patrick Tubach, Paul Kavanagh, Chris Corbould, and Luke O'Byrne	Won	
Visual Effects Society Awards	February 2, 2016	Outstanding Created Environment in a Photoreal Feature	Yannick Dusseault, Mike Wood, Justin van der Lek, and Quentin Marmier for "Falcon Chase / Graveyard"	Won	
Visual Effects Society Awards	February 2, 2016	Outstanding Animated Performance in a Photoreal Feature	Joel Bodin, Arslan Elver, Ian Comley, and Stephen Cullingford for "Maz Kanata"	Nominated	
Visual Effects Society Awards	February 2, 2016	Outstanding Virtual Cinematography in a CG Project	Paul Kavanagh, Colin Benoit, Susumu Yukuhiro, and Greg Salter for "Falcon Chase / Graveyard"	Won	
Visual Effects Society Awards	February 2, 2016	Outstanding Compositing in a Photoreal Feature	Jay Cooper, Marian Mavrovic, Jean Lapointe, and Alex Prichard	Nominated	
Visual Effects Society Awards	February 2, 2016	Outstanding Models in a Photoreal or Animated Project	Joshua Lee, Matthew Denton, Landis Fields, and Cyrus Jam for "BB-8"	Won	
Visual Effects Society Awards	February 2, 2016	Outstanding Effects Simulations in a Photoreal Feature	Rick Hankins, Dan Bornstein, John Doublestein, and Gary Wu for "Starkiller Base"	Nominated	
World Soundtrack Awards	October 19, 2016	Film Composer of the Year	John Williams (Note: Also for The BFG (2016))	Nominated	
