= Spellsinger =

Series of fantasy novels by Alan Dean Foster

Spellsinger is a series of fantasy novels by American writer Alan Dean Foster. At present the series consists of eight books:

1. Spellsinger (1983)
2. The Hour of the Gate (1984)
3. The Day of the Dissonance (1984)
4. The Moment of the Magician (1984)
5. The Paths of the Perambulator (1985)
6. The Time of the Transference (1987)
7. Son of Spellsinger (1993)
8. Chorus Skating (1994)

== Background ==
The story initially deals with the characters of Jonathan Thomas Meriweather, referred to by the locals as Jon-Tom, when he is unwillingly pulled into a fantasy world by the turtle wizard Clothahump. Having been, at the moment of his transportation, high on cannabis, Jon-Tom initially thinks it is all a dream brought on by the drugs. He soon finds out differently: he is in an unfamiliar world with little prospect of returning home anytime soon.

The world of Spellsinger is largely inhabited by animals that are similar to those found on Earth, but are anthropomorphic: generally bipedal, they are intelligent, able to wear clothing and handle tools, generally closer to human-sized than their Earth counterparts, and are capable of speech. Humans, far from being the dominant species, here are just one of many species and numerically form a small minority of inhabitants. The world is not portrayed as an idyllic place—slavery exists, many inhabitants are at times coarse and crudely spoken, and the intense smells at first assault the protagonist. The inhabitants are highly varied—Jon-Tom's friends include the oversexed smooth talking foul-mouthed otter Mudge and his eventual wife Weegee, Caz the smartly dressed polite-spoken rabbit, the turtle Clothahump and his alcoholic assistant Sorbl, and enemies include a ruthless pirate parrot.

The threat to the Western areas are from the Plated Folk, larger versions of insects and other arthropods who live in other parts and periodically mount assaults on the Western areas.

Spiders are not included in the main society, which has centipedes and various insects like beetles. Spiders have their own society known as The Weavers, and are highly isolationist.

== Main characters ==
Many of the primary characters in each of the books only appear for that volume; however, there are a number of characters who appear in the majority of the series.

=== Jon-Tom ===
Jonathan Thomas Meriweather, called "Jon-Tom", is the protagonist in most of the books. He is a student in law at UCLA who is pulled through to this world from Earth by the wizard Clothahump. Since Jon-Tom is high on hallucinogenic drugs at the time, he initially believes that he is dreaming. This belief is soon dispelled when Mudge the Otter stabs him. Mudge, who considers Jonathon Thomas' full name to be too long-winded, nicknames him Jon-Tom. Jon-Tom is an easygoing person, a bit naive, and also someone who seems to look for the best in people. His social skills seem a bit awkward, especially in Mudge's world, and he initially makes a few faux-pas.

His main advantage is that, as he discovers, he is able to wield the power of a spellsinger, a mage who can use songs to cast spells. Unfortunately, he has considerable difficulty learning to control the magic and the results are somewhat unpredictable, but usually still useful. For instance, in a duel with another spellsinger, Jon-Tom sings "Dirty Deeds Done Dirt Cheap," expecting a horde of minions to attack his opponent, but his opponent comments how he barely warded off getting his throat cut instead.

Eventually he matures and gains mastery of his power, and marries Talea (a friend of Mudge). Their child's own adventures, along with Mudge and Weegee's children, are the focus of the later two books.

=== Mudge ===
Mudge is an otter who appears to be an anti-hero in the series due to him being a womanizer, a thief, an alcoholic and a gambler. He also does not take life seriously at all. These traits seem to be common to the otter species in the Spellsinger world, but Mudge takes it to the extreme. He initially encounters Jon-Tom after more or less colliding with him. It is Mudge who convinces Jon-Tom that he is not dreaming by stabbing him with a sword. Despite the fact that he and Jon-Tom had a shaky start, ultimately the duo slowly became close friends through their adventures (though in most books Mudge ends up going unwillingly at the start).

=== Talea ===
Talea is an old acquaintance of Mudge and also happens to have the same profession. She is a human with red hair and green eyes. While she can tolerate Mudge, she finds his lecherous attitude disgusting. She is quick with sword and tongue. She often disagrees with Jon-Tom due to his naïve outlook; this leads to a number of fights between them. She eventually marries Jon-Tom but remains the same ruthlessly sharp person after doing so.

=== Clothahump ===
The old turtle wizard Clothahump brings Jon-Tom to his world while casting a spell seeking an otherworldly wizard to help save his own world. His magic sought to bring an "engineer" to his world, and he got what he was seeking in Jon-Tom: a part-time janitor or "Sanitation Engineer". He is notoriously manipulative of his associates, albeit in the service of benign intentions.

=== Weegee ===
A female otter whom Mudge falls in love with and marries.

=== Buncan ===
Jon-Tom and Talea's son. Wants to be a spellsinger but his singing is horrible, to the point he accidentally summons evil spirits into the house constantly.

=== Squill, Nickum, Neena/Noctor, and Picket ===
Picket and Nickum appear in book six; Squill and Neena are first named in book seven, and are Mudge and Weegee's four children. In book eight Neena was retconned to her name being Noctor. Squill and Neena are tough teenagers who take after Mudge very closely and are Buncan's closest friends. They are decent singers, so they spellsing for Buncan while he plays, making them a musical trio. Picket and Nickum are never mentioned after book six.

== Secondary characters ==
These characters appear in only one or two volumes, though they do play major parts in those stories.

Falameezar-aziz-Sulmonmee

A Marxist dragon originally enlisted to aid Jon-Tom and the others get to Polastrindu after a close encounter where they were nearly eaten. Appears in Books One, Two, and Four.

Roseroar the Tiger

A massive, humanoid white Siberian Tiger who is very skilled at fighting with swords as well as her own claws. She seems to speak with a pronounced Southern drawl. There was a suggestion of a possible romance between her and Jon-Tom in the series but it was never explored. Appears in Book Three.

Caz the Rabbit

A savvy and gentlemanly gambler, somewhat more experienced in cheating in cards than in dice. Extremely polite, even to the point of apologizing to enemies during a fight, Caz is as adept at manipulating words as cards, and often serves as the group's diplomat during his appearances in Books One and Two.

Pog the Bat

Clothahump's first famulus. He has no respect for Clothahump's powers and often directs derisory remarks at him. He indentured himself into service with Clothahump as he wished to attract the attentions of a female peregrine falcon and wanted to make himself more attractive. Clothahump has the means to transform him into a more pleasing form, but ultimately it is his friendship with Jon-Tom that sees his dreams realized... though not in a way anyone expected. Appears in Books One and Two.

Sorbl

An owl and Clothahump's second famulus. Unfortunately, he is extremely unreliable due to his alcoholism. First appears in Book Three, joining the main cast.

The otter tribe

AN adventure loving tribe of otters who help Jon-Tom and Mudge on their quest in book four.

Colin

A Koala in book five that the party rescued from cannibals. He is a fortune teller, predicting using runes, though sometimes his predictions may not be completely correct. He has an accent similar to John Wayne.

Cautious

A raccoon from book six, who comes from a Cajun-style tribe of animals. A tragic incident in the past caused him to lose all emotions making him extremely stoic, though he has a few rare non-stoic moments.

Folly

A young girl the heroes rescue from pirates in book three. She sees Jon-Tom as her knight in shining armour despite she is much too young, which Jon-Tom uncomfortably tells her, but that does not deter her.

Dormas

A no-nonsense hinny who is hired as a guide to the northlands in book five. She writes romance novels in her spare time.

Drom

A gay unicorn in book three.

Teyva

A winged horse in book six whom due to a traumatic almost fatal childhood accident is afraid of flying.

Gragelouth

A sloth merchant from book seven, who aspires to find treasure, inspiring Jon-Tom's son and Mudge's kids to tag along.

Snaugenhutt

A rhino mercenary from book seven who is useless when drunk, but an unstoppable force when sober.

Viz

Snaugenhutt's tickbird.

Caz the Thranx

A dimension hopping alien, in book eight crossing over from Foster's other series, The Humanx Commonwealth

The Princesses

From book eight, six princesses, a Mongoose, a Human, a Lynx, an anteater, a gorilla and an otter, that Jon-Tom and Mudge rescued from a bear baron who was keeping them captive. The princesses are incredibly whiny and ungrateful, though the otter princess flirts with Mudge causing him to question his loyalty to Weegee.

The Mongoose Knights

Knights sent to rescue their princess, but beg Jon-Tom and Mudge to accompany them sending the Princesses back home, as they cannot stand the princess's whining and bickering.

Bribbens

A frog sailor whom the heroes hire as a guide in book two.

== Critical reception ==
The novel series was reviewed by ScreenRant as part of their 10 Books To Read If You Loved The Chronicles of Narnia list and noted "Don't let the talking animals fool you... this is no kids' book" and "Although the setting is Narnia-like, the humour is a weird blend of Mel Brooks and Monty Python." On SFReader.com, David L. Felts commended the series as well, in particular the first book and noted, "Despite the occasional (and unnecessary) profanity, this is a worthy book to introduce to a kid beginning to cut his teeth on speculative fiction."

== Adaptations ==
=== Possible film ===
As of May 2014, fans of the books are attempting to get Spellsinger adapted to film. Vincero Productions optioned the series for potential filming with a screenplay being written by Alan Dean Foster.

=== Dramatised audiobooks ===
A series of dramatised audiobooks courtesy of GraphicAudio was initiated in 2011, with subsequent novels being adapted in the same format.
