= Star Wars: Episode II – Attack of the Clones (novel) =

2002 novel by RA Salvatore

Attack of the Clones
- Editor: Shelly Shapiro
- Author: R. A. Salvatore
- Cover artist: Steven D. Anderson
- Language: English
- Series: Canon G
- Subject: Star Wars
- Genre: Science fiction
- Publisher: Del Rey
- Publication date: Hardcover: April 23, 2002; Paperback: April 1, 2003
- Publication place: United States
- Media type: Hardcover & Paperback
- Pages: 368
- ISBN: 0-345-42882-X
- Preceded by: The Approaching Storm
- Followed by: Boba Fett: The Fight to Survive

The Star Wars: Episode II – Attack of the Clones novelization was written by R. A. Salvatore and published on April 23, 2002 by Del Rey. It is based on the script of the film of the same name. It expands some scenes and includes others which were cut from the film or are entirely original to the book. A limited release of 500 copies were autographed by the author.

== Notable differences between the movie and the novel ==
The biggest addition to the story is the fact that the Lars family are introduced and have their own subplot leading up to when they appear in the movie. The relationships between Shmi Skywalker, Cliegg and Owen Lars, as well as his girlfriend Beru Whitesun are explored in more detail than in the film. Readers are told how Shmi is kidnapped by Tusken Raiders, and in a coalition of farmers' raid against their encampment, Cliegg loses his leg.

There is also a prologue with Padmé Amidala, in which she spends time with her sister Sola and her two young children. There is more interaction between Padmé and Anakin Skywalker, and narration of Padmé's internal monologue concerning her feelings for the young Jedi. This aspect of the story also includes passages where Anakin is introduced to Padmé's family on Naboo—her parents, her sister, and her sister's children (scenes which were filmed but cut from the final edit).

In addition, the relationship between bounty hunter Jango Fett and his cloned son Boba is explored further.

== Reception ==
Star Wars: Episode II – Attack of the Clones reached 2 on the New York Times bestseller list on May 12, 2002.
