= James C. Christensen =

American illustrator and painter (1942–2017)

James Calvin Christensen
- Born: September 26, 1942; Culver City, California, U.S.
- Died: January 8, 2017 (aged 74)
- Education: Brigham Young University
- Style: Fantasy
- Spouse: Carole Christensen
- Relatives: Cassandra Barney, Emily McPhie
- Website: jameschristensenart.com

James Calvin Christensen (September 26, 1942 – January 8, 2017) was an American illustrator and painter of religious and fantasy art.

Christensen was born and raised in Culver City, California. Christensen began his studies at Santa Monica College. He attended the University of California, Los Angeles and obtained a MFA from Brigham Young University (BYU). Christensen only started oil painting after he began studying at BYU.

== Career ==
Christensen began his career as a free-lance illustrator and a junior high school art instructor. Christensen was an instructor at BYU from 1976 until 1997. He has had numerous showings of his work throughout the US and has been commissioned by media companies to create artwork for their publications, such as Time-Life Books and Omni.

Christensen appeared in an episode of ABC's show Extreme Makeover: Home Edition in 2005. He created a picture featuring a member of the family as a fairy. The design team filmed a segment at his studio. The Greenwich Workshop donated a framed Court of the Faeries that Christensen presented to the family for the room as well.

Christensen said his inspirations were myths, fables, fantasies, and tales of imagination. He employed many-layered medieval and Renaissance clothing, and hunched backs symbolizing the burdens people carry in life.

One his trademarks were flying or floating fish and he explained, "In my paintings a fish usually symbolizes wonder and wisdom. I often paint a fish floating in the air to remind the viewer that this is a new reality, that there is magic in the world." He was approached by Pixar to consult on Finding Nemo but declined in order to work on a mural for the Church of Jesus Christ of Latter-day Saints.

Christensen painted several murals for the Provo City Center Temple of the Church of Jesus Christ of Latter-day Saints (LDS Church).

=== Controversy ===
One of Christensen's mermaid images that sparked controversy in Davis County, Utah

Christensen's book Voyage of the Basset was the source of controversy in 2006 when a resident of Bountiful, Utah, demanded that the book be removed from circulation from the young adult section at the Davis County Library in nearby Farmington, Utah because some of the illustrations were deemed too suggestive. The Davis County Library Board voted to keep the book in circulation in the young adult section.

== Personal life ==
Christensen was married to Carole Christensen and they had five children including two artist daughters, Cassandra Barney and Emily McPhie. He was a member of The Church of Jesus Christ of Latter-day Saints. Christensen co-chaired the Mormon Arts Foundation. In the Church, he served as a ward bishop among other callings. He resided in Orem, Utah in a house he designed filled with secret passages and sculptures inspired by his paintings. Christensen died of cancer on January 8, 2017.

== Bibliography ==
- A Journey of the Imagination: The Art of James Christensen by James C. Christensen (The Greenwich Workshop Press, January 1, 1994, ISBN 978-0867130218)
- Voyage of the Basset by James C. Christensen (Artisan, January 10, 1996, ISBN 978-1885183583)
- Rhymes & Reasons: An Annotated Collection of Mother Goose Rhymes by James C. Christensen (The Greenwich Workshop Press, January 6, 1997, ISBN 978-0867130409)
- James Christensen: The Greenwich Workshop's New Century Artists Series by James C. Christensen (The Greenwich Workshop Press, January 9, 2001, ISBN 978-0867130737)
- Passage By Faith: Exploring the Inspirational Art by James C. Christensen (Deseret Book, October 29, 2012)

== Awards ==
Christensen was named a Utah Art Treasure, one of Utah’s Top 100 Artists by the Springville Museum of Art, and received the Governor’s Award for Art from the Utah Arts Council. He served as president of the National Academy of Fantastic Art.

His artwork has been featured on the cover of Leading Edge issue #41, winning him the Chesley Award for cover artwork in 2002. Christensen's work has appeared in the American Illustration Annual and Japan's Outstanding American Illustrators. He also won all the professional art honors the World Science Fiction Convention offers, and multiple Chesley Awards from the Association of Science Fiction and Fantasy Artists.

== See also ==
- Oman, Richard G. (1992), "Artists, Visual", in Ludlow, Daniel H (ed.), Encyclopedia of Mormonism, New York: Macmillan Publishing, pp. 70–73, ISBN 0-02-879602-0, OCLC 24502140
