= Lynn Haney =

American biographer

Lynn Haney is an American biographer. Haney recounted the lives of people such as Josephine Baker and Gregory Peck. Haney is recognized for her balance of thorough research and respect for the subjects of her books, as demonstrated in both Naked At the Feast and A Charmed Life. She wrote eleven books including I Am A Dancer, and The Lady Is A Jock as well as children's books like Perfect Balance: The Story of an Elite Gymnast and Skaters, Profile of a Pair. Before writing full-time, Haney worked for the New York Times and CBS News. Haney lives in Guilford, Connecticut.
