= Humanx Commonwealth =

Fictional interstellar ethical/political entity created by Alan Dean Foster

The Humanx Commonwealth is a fictional interstellar ethical/political entity featured in the science fiction novels of Alan Dean Foster. The Commonwealth takes its name from its two major sapient species, who jointly inhabit Commonwealth planets and administer both the political and religious/ethical aspects. They are the humans of the planet Earth and the insectoid Thranx who dwell upon Hivehom. The Commonwealth is described as a progressive, well-intentioned liberal democracy spanning many star systems, and is somewhat similar to the United Federation of Planets from Star Trek. The Humanx Commonwealth is notable for its portrayal of a human–alien relationship that is not just mutually beneficial but symbiotic, allowing an amalgamation of the two species.

The Prime Emblem of the Humanx alliance, central element of the Humanx Commonwealth flag.

== Commonwealth stories ==
- Midworld (1975)
- Cachalot (1980)
- Nor Crystal Tears (1982)
- Voyage to the City of the Dead (1984)
- Sentenced to Prism (1985)
- The Howling Stones (1997)
- Drowning World (2003)
- Quofum (2008)

=== Stories featuring Flinx ===
- The Tar-Aiym Krang (1972)
- Bloodhype (1973)
- Orphan Star (1977)
- The End of the Matter (1977)
- "Snake Eyes" (short story) (1978)
- For Love of Mother-Not (1983)
- Flinx in Flux (1988)
- Mid-Flinx (1995)
- Reunion (2001)
- "Side Show" (short story) (2002)
- Flinx's Folly (2003)
- Sliding Scales (2004)
- Running from the Deity (2005)
- Trouble Magnet (2006)
- Patrimony (2007)
- "Growth" (short story) (2008)
- Flinx Transcendent (2008)
- Strange Music (2017)

=== Icerigger trilogy ===
- Icerigger (1974)
- Mission to Moulokin (1979)
- The Deluge Drivers (1987)
- "Chilling" (short story) (2006)

=== Founding of the Commonwealth ===
- Phylogenesis (1999)
- Dirge (2000)
- Diuturnity's Dawn (2002)

== Timeline ==
- Nor Crystal Tears (-89 AA) prequel
- Phylogenesis (-60 AA) Founding of the Commonwealth 1
- Dirge (-35 AA) Founding of the Commonwealth 2
- Diuturnity's Dawn (0 AA) Founding of the Commonwealth 3
- Voyage to the City of the Dead (106 AA)
- The Emoman (?? AA but before Icerigger) Short story
- Midworld (445 AA)
- Icerigger (548 AA) Icerigger 1
- For Love of Mother-Not (548 AA) Pip and Flinx 1
- The Tar-Aiym Krang (549 AA) Pip and Flinx 2
- Mission to Moulokin (549 AA) Icerigger 2
- Orphan Star (550 AA) Pip and Flinx 3
- The Deluge Drivers (550 AA) Icerigger 3
- Chilling (550 AA) Icerigger short story
- The End of the Matter (551 AA) Pip and Flinx 4
- Snake Eyes (551 AA) Pip and Flinx short story
- Flinx in Flux (551 AA) Pip and Flinx 5
- Mid-Flinx (552 AA) Pip and Flinx 6
- Reunion (553 AA) Pip and Flinx 7
- Sideshow (554 AA) Pip and Flinx short story
- Drowning World (554 AA)
- Quofum (555 AA)
- Flinx's Folly (557 AA) Pip and Flinx 8
- Sliding Scales (557 AA) Pip and Flinx 9
- Growth (558? AA) Pip and Flinx short story
- Running from the Deity (558 AA) Pip and Flinx 10
- Bloodhype (558 AA) Pip and Flinx 11
- Trouble Magnet (558 AA) Pip and Flinx 12
- The Howling Stones (558 AA)
- Patrimony (559 AA) Pip and Flinx 13
- Sentenced to Prism (571 AA)
- Cachalot (572 AA)
- Mid-Death (? but after Mid-Flinx)
- Flinx Transcendent (? but after Patrimony) Pip and Flinx 14
- Strange Music (? but after Flinx Transcendent) Pip and Flinx 15

== Adaptations ==
In 1987, Steve Jackson Games published the GURPS Humanx sourcebook for their GURPS (Generic Universal Role-Playing System). Scheduled for 2023, Battlefield Press International will be releasing a new game for popular RPG systems.
