= Nor Crystal Tears =

1982 science fiction novel by Alan Dean Foster

- Paperback cover
- Author: Alan Dean Foster
- Cover artist: Michael Whelan
- Language: English
- Genre: Science fiction
- Publisher: Del Rey Books
- Publication date: August 12, 1982
- Publication place: United States
- Media type: Print (Paperback)
- Pages: 231
- ISBN: 0-345-29141-7
- OCLC: 8495122
- Dewey Decimal: 813/.54 19
- LC Class: PS3556.O756 N6 1982

Nor Crystal Tears is a science fiction novel by American writer Alan Dean Foster, first published on 12 August 1982. Foster's ninth book set in the Humanx Commonwealth, it is a first-contact story about the meeting of the insectoid Thranx and Man. This sets in motion the creation of the Humanx Commonwealth; the political body that is the union of human and thranx society which forms the foundation for many of Foster's science-fiction novels.

Nor Crystal Tears is written from the perspective of the Thranx and the cultural lens through which they encounter the monstrous, fleshy alien mammals known as humans. A primary theme is the paranoia and fear the two vastly different races naturally have for each other upon first contact, but also how individuals are able to overcome these innate fears and prejudices and set in motion the foundation for what would become Foster's Humanx Commonwealth.

Foster would further expand on this theme with another alien race, the furry Quozl, in their eponymous novel.

== Plot summary ==
The story follows a Thranx, Ryozenzuzex (i.e. Ryo, of Family Zen, clan Zu, Hive Zex), who came from an odd-numbered hatching (thranx offspring almost always come in multiples of two) immediately making him somewhat different from his brethren. Setting himself aside as different Ryo decides that he has to know what is the secret of the new space-faring race that supposedly wear "their skeletons inside". To accomplish this un-thranxlike task, Ryo travels from his home planet, Willow-Wane, to the ice caps of the Thranx home world, Hivehom, with the aid of the wealthy Wuuzelansem, a poet in search of inspiration. Once on Hivehom he is confronted with the "monsters" and comes to the conclusion that they must set them free, believing that an alliance between Thranx and these so-called "humans" is the only way to stop the aggressive advances of the AAnn Empire.

Thranx military and scientists, by studying the contained humans' tendency to fight amongst each other, came to the conclusion that the entire species could be insane and would destroy Thranx society if they were to attempt any further contact. Ryo, after spending a good amount of time with the humans, decides to aid in their escape from Hivehom. Once they escape, they return to a human research station where the reaction to Ryo is worse than anticipated. When the scientists there decide to kill and dissect Ryo, the crew he rescued from Hivehom returns the favor and helps him escape his death sentence. It is at this point Ryo and the crew come to the conclusion that they must start a long-term program in order to properly integrate human and thranx society.

With the scientists he befriended on Hivehom, Ryo brings a group of human children and researchers to interact with a group of Thranx larvae on his home of Willow-Wane in an attempt to build lasting race relations. The larvae and human children seem to get along well and the compatibility between the two races is confirmed. When an AAnn raiding party attacks Ryo's hive, the militant humans take action, which results in a formal first contact between both human and Thranx governments.

By his risky actions, Ryo plants the seeds of what would become the Humanx Commonwealth.

== Characters ==
- Ryozenzuzex: The novel's central protagonist Ryo was hatched from an odd number of eggs on the Thranx colony world of Willow-Wane and from his larva stage was always a voracious learner. He wanted to be able to learn aspects of all subjects, but this was discouraged and he ultimately chose the career path of agriculture, yet he still yearned for something more. When he heard of the potential existence of a strange, fleshy sentient life he left Willow-Wane on a mad quest. In his journey Ryo would form the foundation for the unity between Humans and Thranx that would become the Humanx Commonwealth. His always supportive premate is Falmiensazex.
- Wuuzelansem: One of the most well-known poets in all of Thranx space, and a native of Willow-Wane, Wuu encounters Ryo when the young thranx attempts a failed mugging. Listening to Ryo's explanation of his yearning to seek out this strange new sentient species, Wuu decides to take Ryo in on an adventure, because the poet sees every new experience as a source of inspiration (A quality that carries over to his future student, Desvendapur, who also plays a crucial role in the foundations of the Humanx Commonwealth).

== See also ==
The following novels form Foster's Founding of the Commonwealth trilogy which further expand upon initial contact between the Thranx and humanity and the events that united the two species.

- Phylogenesis
- Dirge
- Diuturnity's Dawn
