= Avatar (2009 film) =

2009 film by James Cameron

- Theatrical release poster
- Directed by: James Cameron
- Written by: James Cameron
- Produced by: James Cameron; Jon Landau
- Starring: Sam Worthington; Zoe Saldana; Stephen Lang; Michelle Rodriguez; Sigourney Weaver
- Cinematography: Mauro Fiore
- Edited by: Stephen E. Rivkin (Note: Credited as Stephen Rivkin); John Refoua; James Cameron
- Music by: James Horner
- Production companies: 20th Century Fox; Lightstorm Entertainment; Dune Entertainment; Ingenious Film Partners
- Distributed by: 20th Century Fox (Note: Distributed by Walt Disney Studios Motion Pictures in the 2022 re-release)
- Release dates: December 10, 2009 (Odeon Leicester Square); December 18, 2009 (United States)
- Running time: 162 minutes
- Countries: United States; United Kingdom
- Language: English
- Budget: $237 million (Note: Attributed to multiple references:)
- Box office: $2.924 billion

Avatar is a 2009 epic science fiction film written and directed by James Cameron. It features an ensemble cast including Sam Worthington, Zoe Saldaña, Stephen Lang, Michelle Rodriguez, and Sigourney Weaver. It is the first installment in the Avatar film series. It is set in the mid-22nd century, when humans are colonizing Pandora, a lush habitable moon, in order to mine the valuable mineral unobtanium. (Note: Attributed to multiple references:) The expansion of the mining colony threatens the existence of a local tribe of Na'vi, a humanoid species indigenous to Pandora. The title of the film refers to an "avatar", which is a genetically engineered Na'vi body remotely operated from the brain of a human, and which is used to interact with the Na'vi.

Development of Avatar began in 1994, when Cameron wrote an 80-page treatment for the film. Filming was due to take place after the completion of Cameron's 1997 film Titanic, for a planned release in 1999; however, according to Cameron, the necessary technology was not yet available to achieve his vision of the film. Work on the fictional constructed language of the Na'vi began in 2005, and Cameron began developing the screenplay and fictional universe in early 2006. Avatar was budgeted at $237 million, due to the groundbreaking array of new visual effects Cameron achieved in cooperation with Weta Digital. Some estimates put the cost at between $280 million and $310 million for production, and at $150 million for promotion. The film made extensive use of 3D computer graphics and new motion capture filming techniques, and reunited Cameron with his Titanic co-producer Jon Landau.

Avatar premiered at the Odeon Leicester Square theater in London on December 10, 2009, and was released in the United States on December 18 by 20th Century Fox. The film received positive reviews from critics, who praised its groundbreaking visual effects, though the plot received criticism for being derivative. The film broke several box office records, including becoming the highest-grossing film of all time from 2010 to 2019 and again from 2021 to 2026. It also became the first film to gross more than $2 billion, and was the best-selling video title of 2010 in the United States. Adjusted for inflation, Avatar grossed around $4 billion, making it the second-highest-grossing film behind Gone with the Wind (1939).

Avatar received nine nominations at the 82nd Academy Awards, winning three awards, and received numerous other accolades. Its success led to an increase in popularity of 3D films, and to electronics manufacturers releasing 3D televisions. Two sequels have been released: Avatar: The Way of Water (2022) and Avatar: Fire and Ash (2025), with two more in development.

== Plot ==
In 2154, Earth suffers from resource exhaustion and ecological collapse. The Resources Development Administration (RDA) mines the valuable mineral unobtanium on Pandora, a lush habitable moon in the Alpha Centauri star system. Pandora is inhabited by the Na'vi, a 10-foot-tall (3.0 m), blue-skinned, sapient humanoid species that live in harmony with nature.

To explore Pandora, human scientists control Na'vi-human hybrid bodies called "avatars". Each avatar is genetically matched with a human operator. Jake Sully, a paraplegic veteran of the United States Marines, is recruited as an operator after the death of his identical twin, who was training as an operator. The head of the Avatar Program, Dr. Grace Augustine, allows Jake to take the place of his twin, but considers him inadequate.

While Jake, Grace and Dr. Norm Spellman are in their avatars in the forest, Jake is attacked by wild animals. He flees deep into the wilderness, where he is rescued by a female Na'vi named Neytiri. Suspicious of Jake, she takes him to her clan, the Omaticaya. Mo'at, the clan's spiritual leader and the mother of Neytiri, orders her daughter to initiate Jake into their society.

Colonel Miles Quaritch, head of the RDA's security force, promises Jake that the company will restore the use of his legs if he provides information about the Na'vi and their gathering place, the giant Hometree, which sits atop a rich deposit of unobtanium. Jake and Neytiri fall in love as Jake is initiated into the clan, and they choose each other as mates. When Jake attempts to disable a bulldozer threatening a sacred Na'vi site, RDA administrator Parker Selfridge orders the destruction of Hometree.

Grace explains to Selfridge that destroying Hometree would damage the biological neural network that connects all Pandoran life, which prompts Selfridge to reluctantly give Jake and Grace one hour to convince the Na'vi to evacuate. Jake confesses to the Na'vi that he was a spy for the RDA, which prompts the clan to take him and Grace captive. Quaritch's soldiers destroy Hometree and kill many Na'vi, including Eytukan, who is the clan chief and Neytiri's father. Mo'at frees Jake and Grace, but they are detached from their avatars and imprisoned by Quaritch's forces. Trudy Chacón, a pilot who is disgusted by Quaritch's brutality, rescues Jake, Grace, and Norm. During the escape, Grace is shot and fatally wounded.

Jake regains the trust of the Na'vi by connecting his mind to the Toruk, a dragon-like creature feared and revered by the clan. Supported by Neytiri and the new chief Tsu'tey, Jake unites the Omaticaya, and tells them to gather other Na'vi clans to fight the RDA as it prepares to assault the Tree of Souls. Before the battle, Jake prays to the Na'vi mother goddess Eywa through a neural connection with the Tree of Souls.

The Na'vi and their human allies lose many fighters during the battle, including Tsu'tey and Trudy. The tide turns when wild animals unexpectedly join the fight and overwhelm the RDA forces; Neytiri interprets this occurrence as Eywa answering Jake's prayer. Quaritch, in an Amplified Mobility Platform suit, breaks open the avatar link unit containing Jake's human body, exposing it to Pandora's poisonous atmosphere. As Quaritch prepares to kill Jake, he is slain by Neytiri; she then saves Jake from suffocation.

In the aftermath of the war, the RDA is expelled from Pandora. Some humans are allowed to remain, including Jake and Norm. With the help of the Tree of Souls, Neytiri, and Mo'at, Jake is permanently transferred into his avatar.

== Cast ==
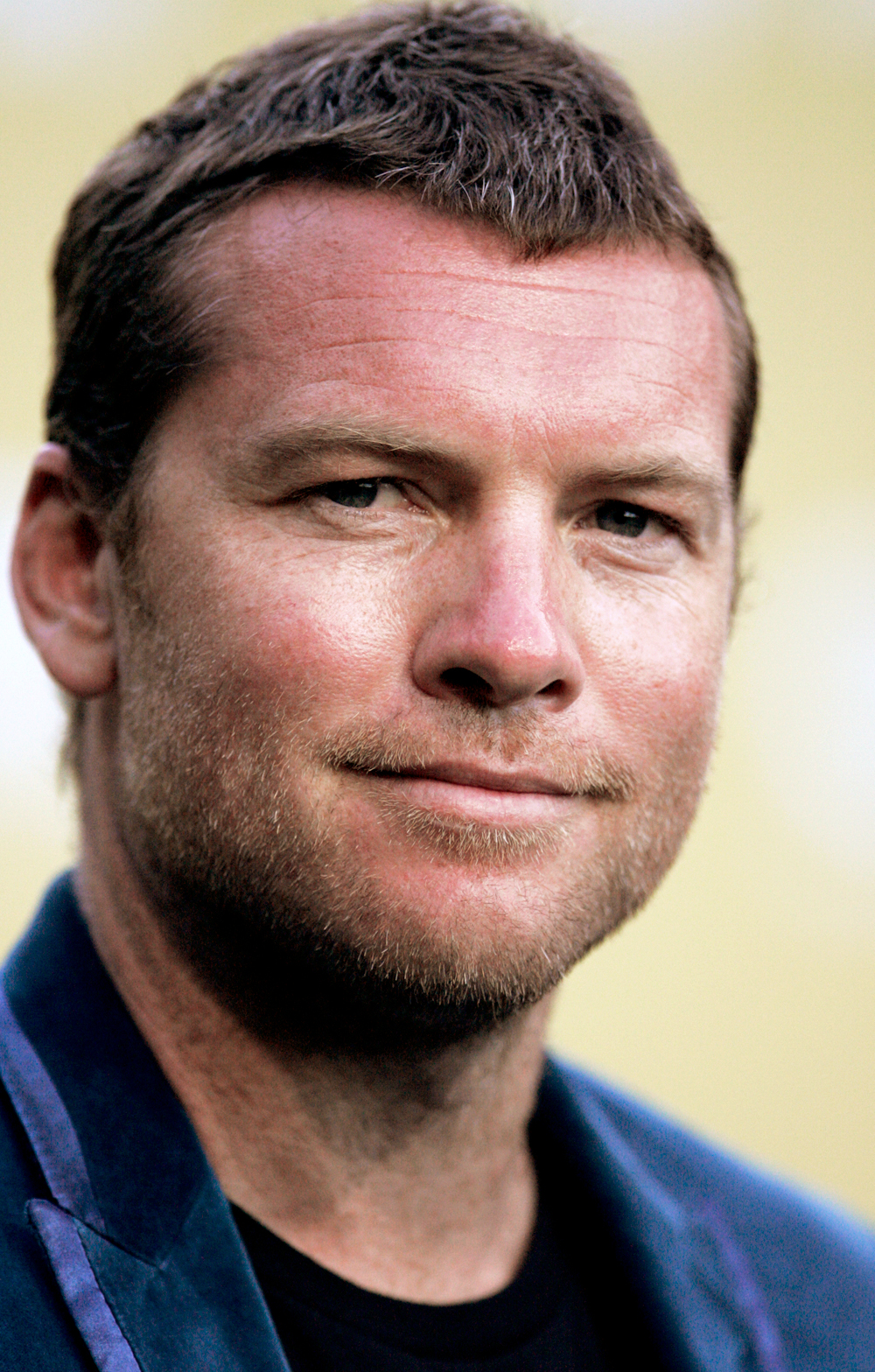
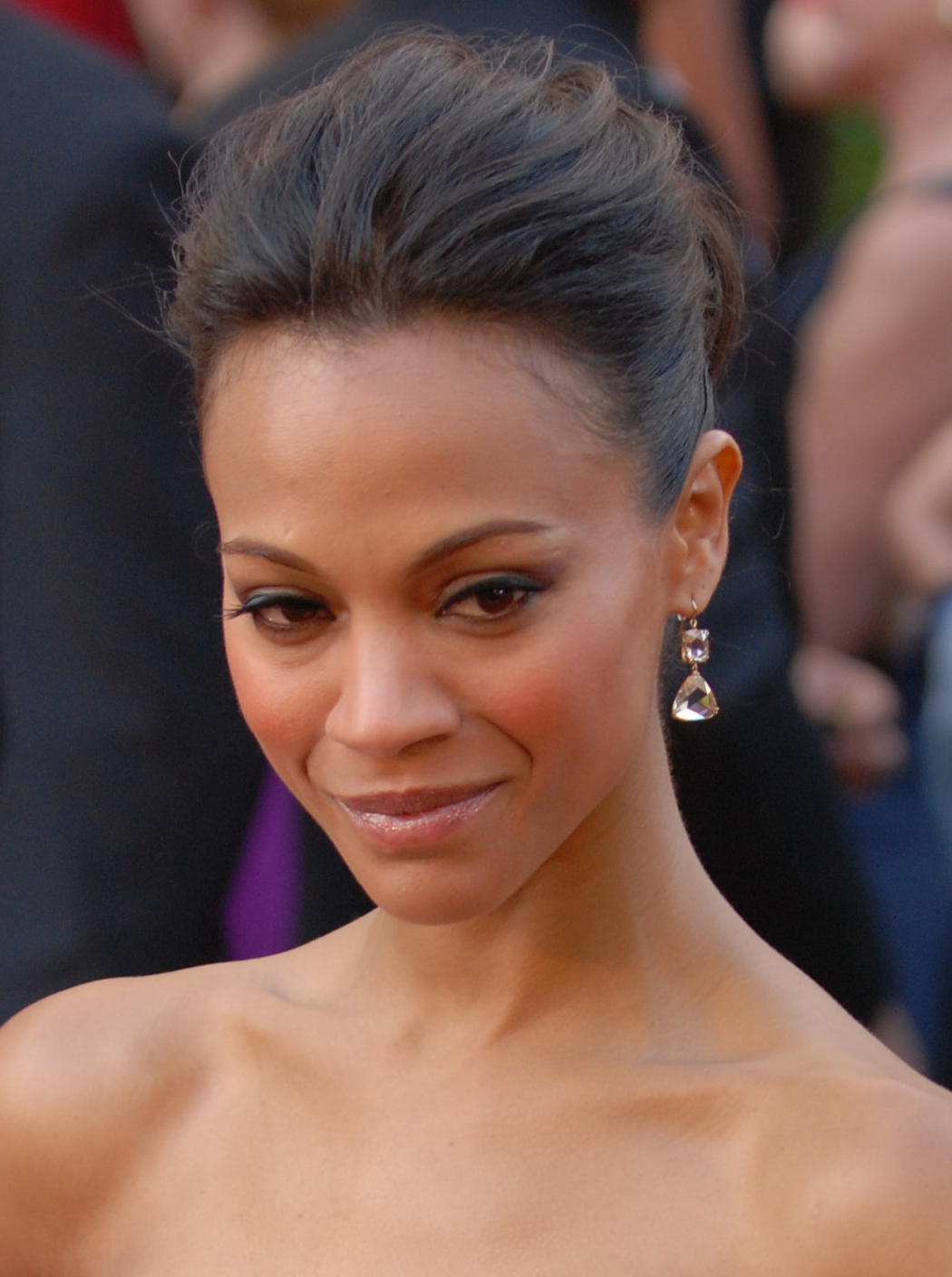
Sam Worthington (left, pictured in 2013) and Zoe Saldaña (2010)
- Sam Worthington as Jake Sully: A disabled former US Marine who joins the Avatar Program to replace his dead twin brother.
- Zoe Saldaña as Neytiri: A fierce Na'vi warrior. She teaches Jake about the Na'vi culture and eventually falls in love with him.
- Stephen Lang as Colonel Miles Quaritch: The commander of the RDA security forces.
- Michelle Rodriguez as Captain Trudy Chacón: A combat pilot assigned to support the Avatar Program who is sympathetic to the Na'vi.
- Giovanni Ribisi as Parker Selfridge: The corporate administrator of the RDA mining operation.
- Joel David Moore as Dr. Norm Spellman: A "xenoanthropologist" who studies plant and animal life as part of the Avatar Program.
- CCH Pounder as Mo'at: The Omaticaya's spiritual leader, Neytiri's mother, and Eytukan's wife.
- Wes Studi as Eytukan: The chief of the Omatikaya clan, Mo'at's husband, and Neytiri's father.
- Laz Alonso as Tsu'tey: The finest warrior of the Omaticaya, he is heir to the chieftainship of the tribe.
- Sigourney Weaver as Dr. Grace Augustine: An exobiologist and head of the Avatar Program. (Note: Attributed to multiple references:)
- Dileep Rao as Dr. Max Patel: A scientist who works in the Avatar Program and comes to support Jake's rebellion against the RDA.
- Matt Gerald as Corporal Lyle Wainfleet: An RDA soldier and Quaritch's right-hand man.

Alicia Vela-Bailey appears in three uncredited roles: Ikeyni, the leader of the Tayrangi clan; Saeyla, a young Na'vi hunter; and a woman who is harassed in a bar. Vela-Bailey also served as Saldaña's stunt double.

== Production ==
=== Development ===
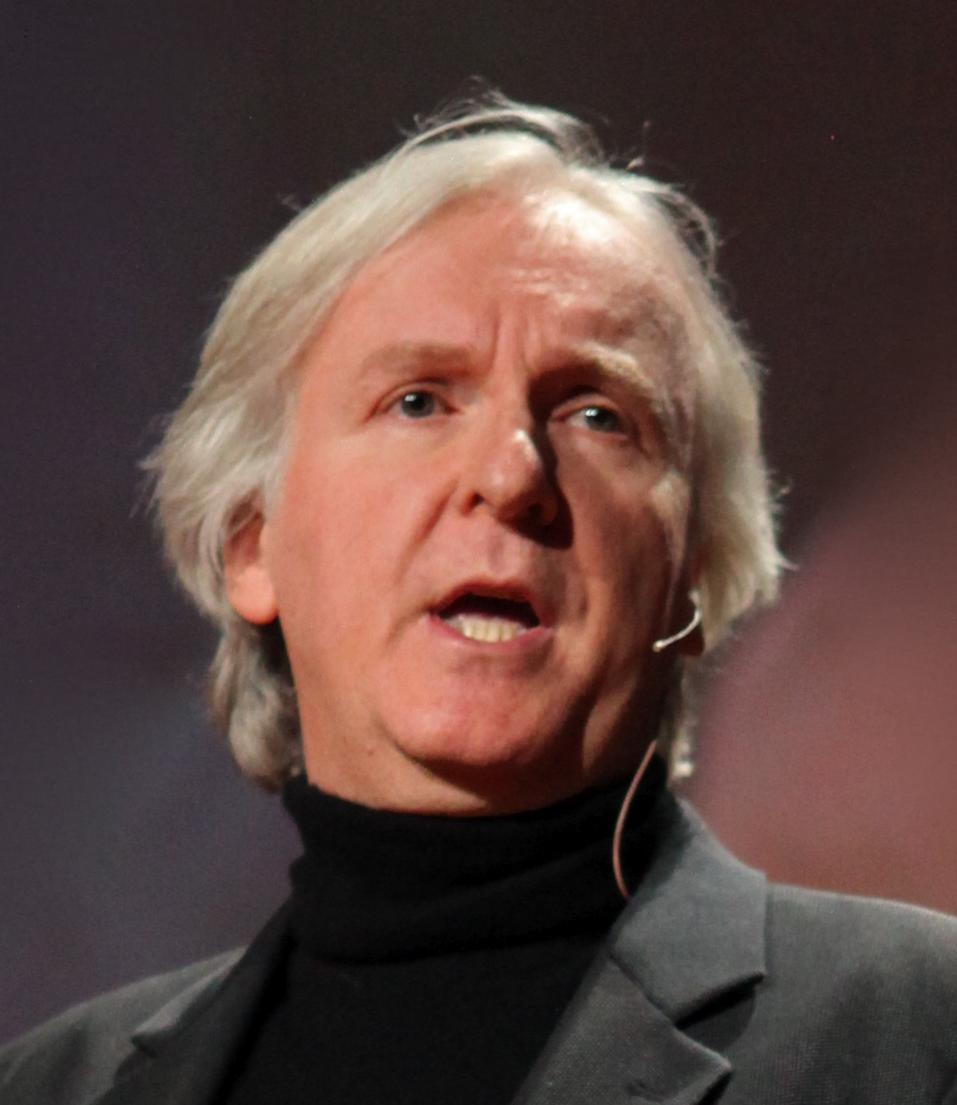
Avatar creator James Cameron, pictured in 2010

In 1994, Avatar director James Cameron wrote an 80-page treatment for the film, drawing inspiration from science fiction books he read in his childhood, as well as from adventure novels by Edgar Rice Burroughs and H. Rider Haggard. He was also influenced by a dream he had when he was 19 years old, which included a bioluminescent forest with fiber-optic trees, fan lizards, and purple moss that lit up when stepped on. In August 1996, Cameron announced that after completing Titanic, he would direct Avatar, a science-fiction film that would feature computer-generated characters. The visual effects studio Digital Domain joined the project, which was supposed to begin production in mid-1997 for a 1999 release. However, Cameron felt that available technology had not caught up with his vision for the film. He put Avatar on hold for several years, and focused on refining the necessary technology and making documentaries. Eventually, the technological advances used in the creation of computer-generated characters such as Gollum (2002), King Kong (2005), and Davy Jones (2006) helped convince Cameron that he could realize his vision for Avatar. (Note: Attributed to multiple references:)

20th Century Fox had committed to produce Avatar, but the studio was afraid of cost overruns and delays, which had plagued Cameron's previous film, Titanic. Fox fronted $10 million to Cameron to create a proof of concept clip for Avatar, which he showed to executives in October 2005. According to Cameron, the executives were excited about the clip, but they still wanted a shorter script and a smaller budget for the film than what Cameron had proposed. In response to these concerns, Cameron combined several characters in the screenplay. He also offered to cut his salary in half, and said he would take a lower percentage of the film's revenues if it was a commercial failure. Fox was still unconvinced, and in mid-2006 decisively declined to produce the film, according to Cameron.

Cameron then approached Walt Disney Studios, showing his Avatar clip to Disney CEO Bob Iger, then-studio chairman Dick Cook, and Alan Bergman. However, when Disney attempted to take over the project, Fox exercised its right of first refusal and committed to making Avatar in October 2006. Ingenious Media agreed to back the film, reducing Fox's financial exposure to less than half of the film's official $237 million budget. Fox planned to spend $150 million on marketing and make use of about $30 million in tax credits to further lessen the financial impact on the studio and its financiers. (Note: Attributed to multiple references:) After Fox accepted Avatar, one skeptical executive told Cameron, "I don't know if we're crazier for letting you do this, or if you're crazier for thinking you can do this ..."

=== Design ===
Neytiri (left) and Jake in his avatar form in a still from the film. One of the inspirations for the Na'vi was a dream that Cameron's mother told him about.

Long before Cameron started work on Avatar, his mother told him about a dream she had which featured a blue-skinned woman 12 feet (4 m) tall. Cameron liked the image and created a race of tall, beautiful blue people with golden eyes for his first screenplay, which was written in 1976 or 1977 and never produced. He created some paintings of these people, and when he was developing Avatar he drew upon this early work as inspiration for the Na'vi. In later interviews, Cameron said another reason for making the Na'vi blue was that it connects them to Hindu deities. (Note: The human manifestations of several Hindu deities—including Vishnu, Krishna, and Rama—have blue skin.) (Note: Attributed to multiple references:)

Cameron recruited the fantasy illustrator Wayne Barlowe and the concept artist Jordu Schell to help him design the Na'vi. The designers used paintings and physical sculptures because Cameron felt that 3D renderings were not capturing his vision. Paul Frommer, a linguist at USC, was recruited to create a language for the Na'vi. The language has a lexicon of about 1000 words, with about 30 contributed by Cameron. Its phonemes include ejective consonants similar to those found in Amharic.

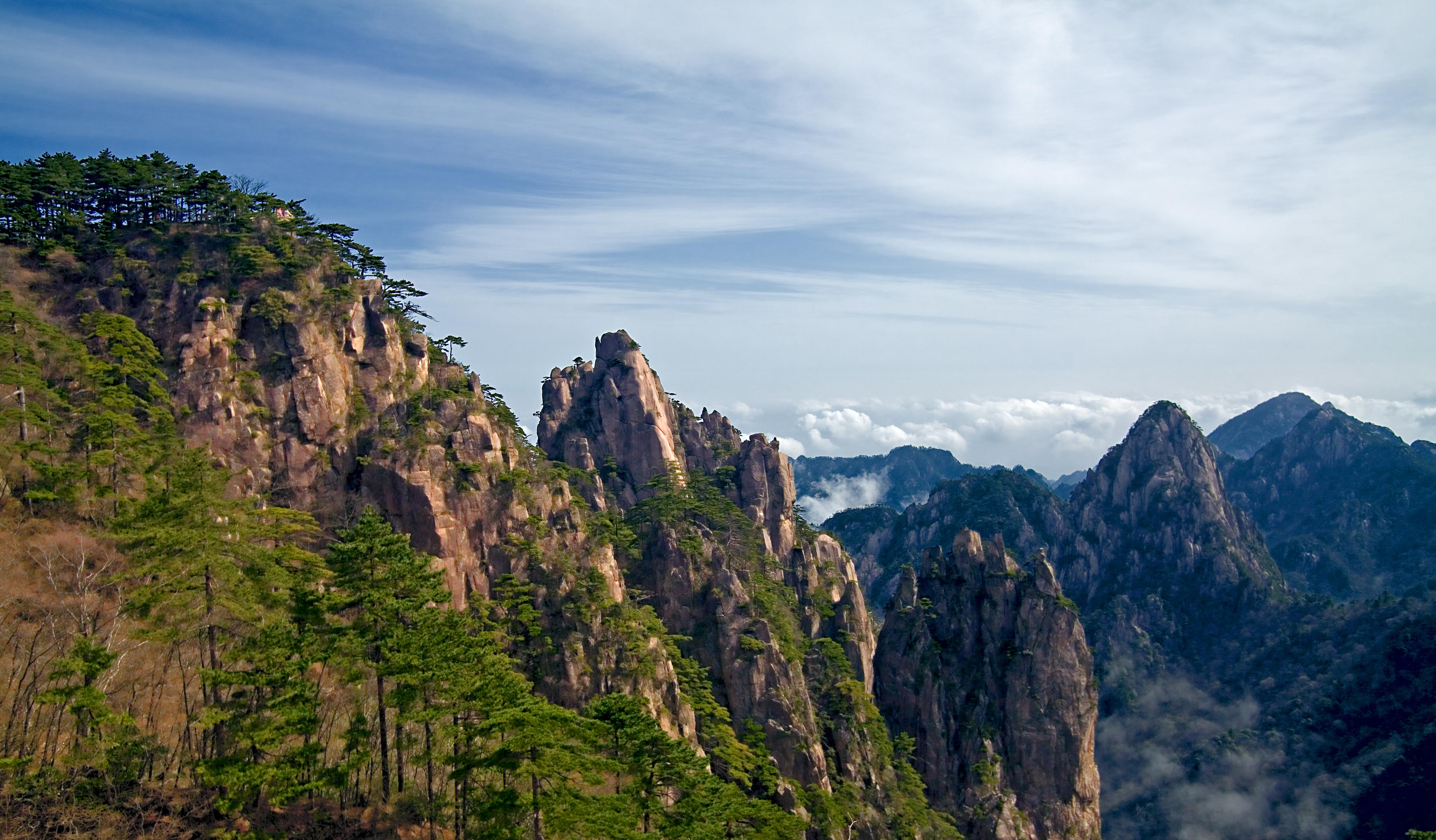
Pandora's floating "Hallelujah Mountains" were inspired in part by the Chinese Huangshan mountains.

In July 2006, Cameron announced that he would film Avatar for a mid-2008 release, with principal photography beginning in February 2007. Designer Stan Winston, who had worked with Cameron in the past, joined the production, as did the visual effects studio Weta Digital. Production design for the film took several years. Avatar had two different production designers, Rick Carter and Robert Stromberg, and two separate art departments, one of which focused on the flora and fauna of Pandora, and another that designed the human-made machines depicted in the film. The production team also consulted with Jodie S. Holt, a professor of plant physiology at the University of California, Riverside. She offered ideas about how scientists, such as Sigourney Weaver's character Grace Augustine, might study plants on an alien world. She also helped the design team conceive of ways that organisms on Pandora might communicate with each other. In September, The Washington Post reported that Cameron would be using his own Reality Camera System to film Avatar in 3D. The system would employ two high-definition cameras in a single camera body to create depth perception.

To create the interiors of the mining colony, production designers visited the Clyde Boudreaux oil platform in the Gulf of Mexico during June 2007. They photographed, measured and filmed every aspect of the interior of the platform, which was then replicated on-screen with CGI during post-production. According to production designer Dylan Cole, the film's floating "Hallelujah Mountains", were inspired mainly by karst limestone formations in the Guilin, Huangshan and Zhangjiajie regions of China.

=== Casting ===
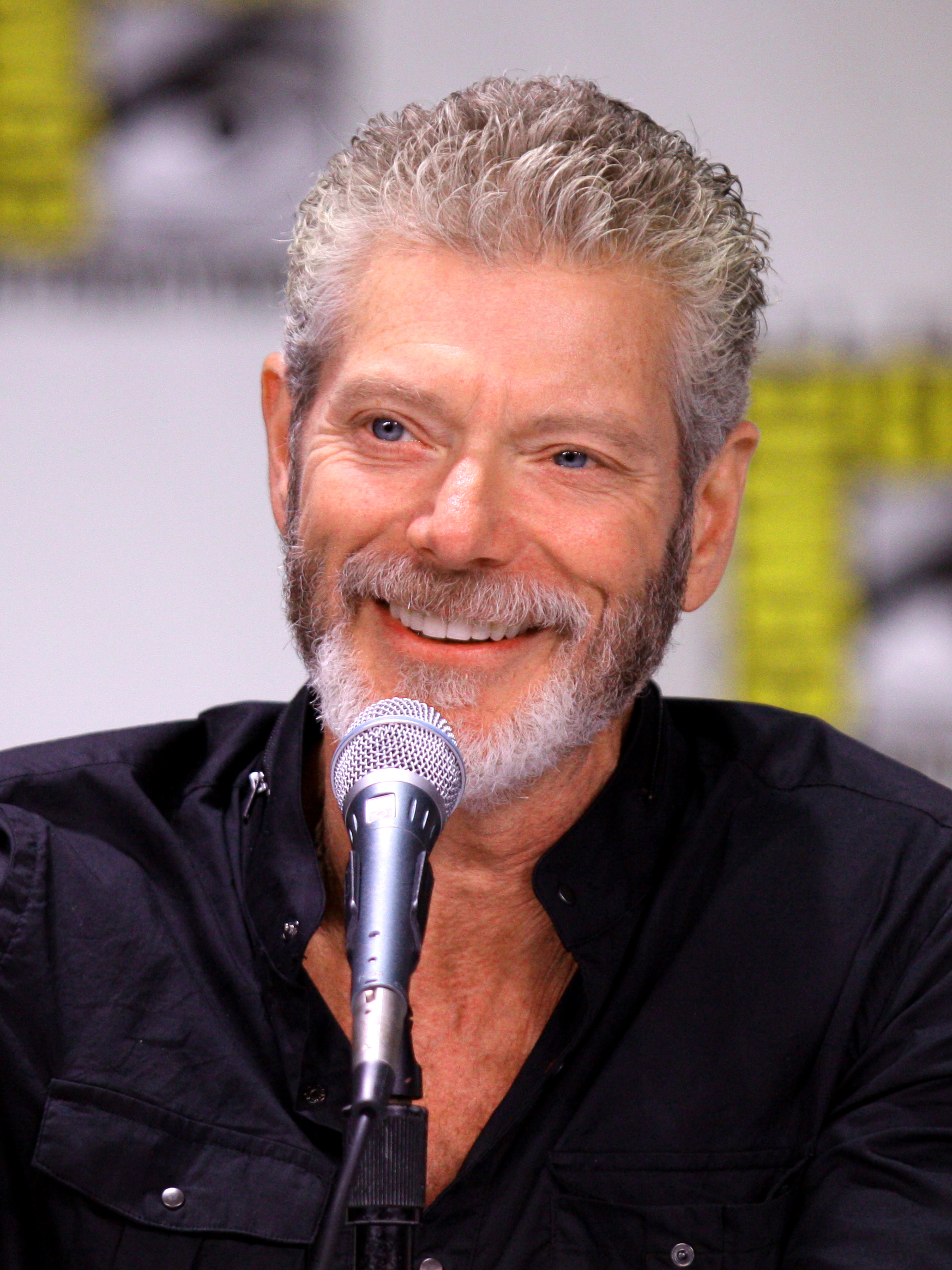
Stephen Lang in 2011

Chris Evans, Chris Pine, Chris Pratt and Channing Tatum were considered for the role of Jake Sully. Matt Damon was a candidate, but the production schedule of Avatar conflicted with his work on The Bourne Ultimatum (2007). 20th Century Fox pushed for Jake Gyllenhaal to play the part, but Gyllenhaal was focused on Prince of Persia: The Sands of Time (2010). (Note: Attributed to multiple references:) Sam Worthington, at the time a relatively unknown actor, became frustrated after several secretive auditions—he was not told what the film was about or who was directing. He had an angry outburst, which caught the attention of Cameron, who was seeking an actor with a certain amount of "grit". Once Cameron had narrowed down the list of candidates to Evans, Tatum and Worthington, he compared how each actor read Jake's rallying speech to the Na'vi near the end of the film, and he felt Worthington's performance was the best. Cameron said that Worthington had two contradictory but necessary qualities for the role—toughness and vulnerability. In addition to playing Jake, Worthington briefly appears as Jake's deceased identical twin, Dr. Tom "Tommy" Sully. When he was cast in Avatar, Worthington also signed on for potential sequels.

Before casting Zoe Saldaña as Neytiri, Cameron considered Q'orianka Kilcher for the role. Since Saldaña was cast early in production, she helped screen-test actors auditioning for the part of Jake, including her eventual co-star Worthington. Neytiri, like all the Na'vi, was created using performance capture, and her outward appearance is entirely computer generated. Like Worthington, Saldaña signed on for potential sequels. Cameron felt that Worthington and Saldaña had "great chemistry" during filming.

Cameron approached Josh Brolin for the role of Miles Quaritch, but Brolin did not want to commit to a lengthy shoot. Stephen Lang, who had unsuccessfully auditioned for a role in Cameron's Aliens (1986), was cast instead. Michael Biehn, who had worked with Cameron on Aliens, The Terminator (1984) and Terminator 2: Judgment Day (1991), was also briefly considered for the role.

== Filming ==
=== Location ===
Principal photography for Avatar began in 2007. Motion-capture filming occurred at the Hughes Aircraft stage in Playa Vista, Los Angeles, while live-action filming took place in Wellington on the soundstages of Weta Digital. (Note: Attributed to multiple references:) Cameron made on-set catering 100% plant-based to align with his personal environmental convictions. The actors had been trained in skills specific to their characters, including archery, horseback riding, firearm use, hand-to-hand combat, and the Na'vi language. Before shooting began on the soundstage, Cameron sent the cast to Hawaii to get a feel for a rainforest setting. Cameron described the film as a "true hybrid"—a fully live-action shoot combined with computer-generated characters in both digital and live-action environments. According to Cameron, the film is composed of 60% computer-generated elements and 40% live action elements, and he hoped that audiences would be unable to tell the difference between the two when viewing the film.

=== Live action ===
The live action footage was shot with a modified version of the proprietary digital 3D Fusion Camera System developed by Cameron and Vince Pace. In January 2007, Fox had announced that 3D filming for Avatar would be done at 24 frames per second, despite Cameron's belief that 3D requires a higher frame rate to make strobing less noticeable. Cameron also utilized his virtual camera system, a new way of directing motion-capture performances. The system allowed Cameron to view actors in digital settings in real-time, which gave him greater flexibility to adjust scenes while shooting. According to Cameron, "It's like a big, powerful game engine. If I want to fly through space, or change my perspective, I can. I can turn the whole scene into a living miniature and go through it on a 50-to-1 scale." He described the system as a "form of pure creation where if you want to move a tree or a mountain or the sky or change the time of day, you have complete control over the elements". Cameron gave the directors Steven Spielberg and Peter Jackson a chance to test the new technology. Spielberg said, "I like to think of it as digital makeup, not augmented animation ... Motion capture brings the director back to a kind of intimacy that actors and directors only know when they're working in live theater."

=== Visual effects ===
Cameron used a specially designed camera that allowed the facial expressions of the actors to be digitally recorded for the animators to use later.

A number of innovative visual effects techniques were used during production. According to Cameron, work on the film had been delayed since the 1990s to allow the techniques to reach the necessary degree of advancement to adequately realize his vision of the film. He planned to make use of photorealistic computer-generated characters, created using new motion capture animation technologies he had been developing in the 14 months leading up to December 2006.

Innovations included a new system for lighting massive areas like Pandora's jungle, a motion-capture stage six times larger than any previously used, and an improved method for capturing facial expressions, enabling full performance capture. To achieve the face capturing, actors wore skull caps fitted with a tiny camera positioned in front of the actors' faces; the information collected about their facial expressions and eyes was then transmitted to computers. According to Cameron, the method allowed the filmmakers to transfer 100% of the actors' physical performances to their digital counterparts. There were also numerous reference cameras which provided digital artists with multiple angles of each performance.

The lead visual effects company was Weta Digital in Wellington, which at one point employed 900 people working on the film. To manage and synchronize massive amounts of data for remote crew members, Microsoft built a custom cloud and Digital Asset Management (DAM) system for Avatar called Gaia. To render Avatar, Weta used a 930 m^{2} (10,000 sq ft) server farm with 4,000 Hewlett-Packard servers. (Note: Attributed to multiple references:) A new texturing and paint software system, called Mari, was developed by The Foundry in cooperation with Weta. Creating the Na'vi characters and the virtual world of Pandora required over a petabyte of digital storage, and each minute of the final footage for Avatar occupies 17.28 gigabytes of storage. It would often take the computer several hours to render a single frame of the film. To finish the special effects sequences on time, a number of other companies were brought on board, including Industrial Light & Magic, which worked alongside Weta to create the battle sequences. ILM was responsible for the visual effects for many of the film's vehicles and devised a new way to make CGI explosions. Joe Letteri was the film's visual effects general supervisor.

=== Music ===
James Horner – "Jake Enters His Avatar World"
Listen to a clip from the Avatar score

James Horner composed the musical score for Avatar, his third collaboration with Cameron after Aliens and Titanic. He worked with Wanda Bryant, an ethnomusicologist, to create a music culture for the Na'vi, and recorded parts of the score with a small chorus singing in the Na'vi language in March 2008. Horner promised Cameron that he would devote his attention solely to Avatar and no other projects, and he reportedly worked on the score from four in the morning until ten at night throughout the process. He stated in an interview that it was the most difficult scored he had worked on. He composed the score as two different scores merged into one. He first created a score that reflected the Na'vi way of sound and then combined it with a separate "traditional" score to drive the film. Leona Lewis sang the theme song for the film, called "I See You". An accompanying music video, directed by Jake Nava, premiered December 15, 2009, on MySpace.

== Themes and inspirations ==
Cameron said Avatar was inspired by various science fiction and adventure stories he read in his youth, including the John Carter and Tarzan stories by Edgar Rice Burroughs, as well as stories by Rudyard Kipling and H. Rider Haggard. (Note: Attributed to multiple references:) He acknowledged that Avatar shares themes with the films The Emerald Forest (1985), At Play in the Fields of the Lord (1991), and Princess Mononoke (1997), which feature clashes between cultures and civilizations, and with Dances with Wolves, in which a soldier finds himself drawn to the culture he was meant to fight against. Several other films about outsiders interacting with indigenous or foreign cultures also inspired Cameron, including Lawrence of Arabia (1962), The Jungle Book (1967), The Man Who Would Be King (1975), The Mission (1986), Medicine Man (1992), and FernGully (1992). He said Princess Mononoke influenced the ecosystem of Pandora, while the idea of a "world mind" originated in the novel Solaris by Stanislaw Lem. (Note: Attributed to multiple references:) Cameron was also influenced by 2001: A Space Odyssey (1968).

Cameron said he learned the term "avatar" by reading the cyberpunk novels Neuromancer by William Gibson and Islands in the Net by Bruce Sterling. The remotely-controlled avatars in Avatar were influenced by the manga series Ghost in the Shell, the short story "In the Imagicon" by George Henry Smith, and the novel The City and the Stars by Arthur C. Clarke. (Note: Attributed to multiple references:) Cameron intended for Jake and Neytiri to have a star-crossed love story in the tradition of Romeo and Juliet. He acknowledged similarities between the pairing of Jake and Neytiri to the pairing of Jack and Rose in his film Titanic (1997). Cameron said Neytiri was inspired by the Native American woman Pocahontas.

While Cameron wanted Avatar to be entertaining, he also hoped it would invite viewers to think about how they relate to nature and to other people. He said the Na'vi represent the "higher selves" or "aspirational selves" of viewers, while the humans in the film are an allegory to humanity's short-sighted destruction of the Earth. Cameron acknowledged that Avatar implicitly criticizes the role of the United States in the Iraq War and the impersonal nature of mechanized warfare. He stated that the fiery destruction of the Na'vi Hometree bears a resemblance to the September 11 attacks on the World Trade Center.

In 2012, in response to several lawsuits alleging that Cameron based Avatar on other people's ideas, Cameron filed a 45-page legal declaration describing the origins of the ideas, themes, storylines, and characters of Avatar. He drew connections between Avatar and his own life experiences, his previous films, several of his unproduced projects, and historical events, such as European colonization of the Americas. He said the script and concept art for Xenogenesis—a feature film project of his which was never produced as a feature, but which was partially produced as a short film—were the basis for many of the ideas and visual designs in Avatar.

== Marketing ==
=== Promotions ===
In July 2009, Cameron, producer Jon Landau, Zoe Saldaña, Stephen Lang, and Sigourney Weaver promoted Avatar at San Diego Comic-Con, where 25 minutes of the film was screened in Dolby 3D. (Note: Attributed to multiple references:) On August 21, which was dubbed "Avatar Day", the first trailer was released; toys related to the film and a trailer for an Avatar video game were also unveiled. (Note: Attributed to multiple references:) The Avatar film trailer was viewed four million times the first day it was available online, a record at the time. On October 30, to celebrate the opening of Megastar Cinema, the first 3D cinema in Vietnam, Fox allowed the theater to screen an exclusive 16 minutes of Avatar for selected journalists. Two days later, a new trailer premiered live during a Dallas Cowboys football game at Cowboys Stadium in Arlington, Texas, on the Diamond Vision screen, one of the world's largest video displays, and to television audiences viewing the game on Fox. It was the largest live motion picture trailer viewing in history at the time.

The Coca-Cola Company collaborated with Fox to launch a global marketing campaign for the film. The centerpiece of the campaign was the website AVTR.com. Specially marked bottles and cans of Coca-Cola Zero, when held in front of a webcam, enabled users to interact with the website's 3D features using augmented reality (AR) technology. The film was also promoted in the Fox series Bones during the episode "The Gamer In The Grease". McDonald's had a promotion mentioned in television commercials in Europe called "Avatarize yourself", which directed viewers to a website where they could create a Na'vi version of themselves. A week prior to the US release, Zoe Saldaña promoted the film on Adult Swim.

=== Books ===
Several Avatar-related books were published ahead of the film's release. Harper Entertainment released a field guide to Pandora titled Avatar: A Confidential Report on the Biological and Social History of Pandora. HarperFestival published James Cameron's Avatar: The Reusable Scrapbook for children, and Abrams Books released The Art of Avatar and The Making of Avatar. (Note: Attributed to multiple references:) Following the release of the film, Cameron and producer Jon Landau stated in interviews that Cameron planned to write a novelization of Avatar and also a prequel novel. (Note: Attributed to multiple references:) In 2013, Cameron hired Steven Gould to write four standalone novels to expand the Avatar universe. None of the announced novels have been published.

=== Other merchandise ===
France Post released a limited edition Avatar postage stamp in December 2009, the month of the film's release. Mattel released a line of Avatar action figures, each of which had an "i-TAG", which customers could scan using a webcam to reveal bonus content. (Note: Attributed to multiple references:)

== Release ==
Avatar premiered in London on December 10, 2009, and was released theatrically worldwide from December 16 to 18. The film was originally set for release on May 22, 2009, but the date was pushed back to allow more time for post-production and to give theaters more time to install 3D projectors. Avatar was released in a total of 3,457 theaters in the United States, of which 2,032 theaters showed it in 3D. In total, 90% of all advance ticket sales for Avatar were for 3D screenings. Internationally, Avatar opened on a total of 14,604 screens in 106 territories (of which 3,671 were showing the film in 3D) producing 56% of the first weekend gross. The film opened in the IMAX 3D format in 178 US theaters. The international IMAX release included 58 theaters beginning on December 16, with 25 more theaters added in the following weeks. With a total of 261 theaters worldwide, it was the widest IMAX release at the time. In Korea, Avatar was released in 4D, which included "moving seats, smells of explosives, sprinkling water, laser lights and wind".

A theatrical re-release of an extended version of the film, titled Avatar: Special Edition, was launched exclusively in 3D and IMAX 3D on August 27, 2010. During its 12-week re-release, Avatar: Special Edition grossed $10.74 million in the US and Canada and $22.46 million in other countries for a worldwide total of $33.2 million. The film was re-released in China in March 2021, which allowed it to surpass Avengers: Endgame to become the highest-grossing film.

Avatar was re-released in theaters for two weeks starting on September 23, 2022, ahead of the December 2022 release of its first sequel, Avatar: The Way of Water. Avatar was remastered for the re-release in 4K high-dynamic range, with certain scenes at 48 frames per second.

== Box office ==
Avatar was released internationally on more than 14,000 screens. It grossed $3.5 million from midnight screenings in the United States and Canada, with the initial 3D release limited to 2,200 screens. It grossed $26.8 million on its opening day, and $77 million over its opening weekend, making it the second-largest December opening ever behind I Am Legend, and the largest domestic opening weekend for a non-franchise film. Avatar also set an IMAX opening weekend record, with 178 theaters generating approximately $9.5 million.

International markets generating opening weekend tallies of at least $10 million were Russia ($19.7 million), France ($17.4 million), the United Kingdom ($13.8 million), Germany ($13.3 million), South Korea ($11.7 million), Australia ($11.5 million), and Spain ($11.0 million). The film's worldwide gross was $241.6 million after five days, the ninth-largest opening-weekend gross in history, and the largest for a non-franchise, non-sequel and original film. Outside the US and Canada, 58 IMAX screens generated an estimated $4.1 million during the opening weekend.

During its second weekend, the film saw a decline of 1.8% in the US and Canada, but remained at the top of the box office with a gross of $75.6 million, the biggest second weekend in history at the time. (Note: Attributed to multiple references:) Avatar saw another marginal decrease in revenue in its third weekend, dropping 9.4% to $68.5 million domestically, remaining in first place at the box office and setting a third-weekend record. Avatar crossed the $1 billion mark on the 19th day of its international release, making it the fastest film to reach the mark, and became the fifth film to gross more than $1 billion worldwide. In its fourth weekend, Avatar continued to lead the box office in the US and Canada, setting a fourth-weekend record of $50.3 million and becoming the highest-grossing 2009 release in the United States, ahead of Transformers: Revenge of the Fallen. In the film's fifth weekend, it set a Martin Luther King Day weekend record, grossing $54.4 million, and set a fifth-weekend record with $42.8 million. It continued to hold the top spot at the box office while setting sixth and seventh weekend records of $34.9 million and $31.3 million respectively. It was the fastest film to gross $600 million in the US and Canada, on its 47th day in theaters.

In January 2010, Avatar surpassed Titanic to become the highest-grossing film worldwide. (Note: Attributed to multiple references:) It also became the highest-grossing film in 30 countries; (Note: Attributed to multiple references:) the first film to gross over $700 million in the United States and Canada; nd the first film to gross over $2 billion outside the United States and Canada. It remained number one at the US and Canadian box office for seven consecutive weeks, the most consecutive No. 1 weekends since Titanic spent 15 weekends at No.1 in 1997 and 1998. It also spent 11 consecutive weekends at No. 1 outside the United States and Canada, breaking the record of nine consecutive weekends set by Pirates of the Caribbean: Dead Man's Chest. On February 2, it became the highest-grossing film in the United States and Canada, again surpassing Titanic. IMAX ticket sales have accounted for a record $268.6 million of its worldwide gross. (Note: Attributed to multiple references:)

By the end of its first theatrical release, Avatar had grossed a worldwide total of $2.75 billion. When revenue from the Avatar: Special Edition re-release in 2010 is included, the film grossed a total of $785.2 million in the US and Canada and $2.1 billion in other countries, for a worldwide total of $2.9 billion. The Hollywood Reporter estimated that Avatar turned a net profit of $1.2 billion from its theatrical run. Avatar remained the highest-grossing film of all time until it was surpassed in 2019 by Avengers: Endgame. Further re-releases between 2021 and 2022 led the film to regain the record, which it held until October 2026, when Endgame broke the record after it was re-released under the title Avengers Endgame: Encore.

Box Office Mojo estimates that after adjusting for the rise in average ticket prices, Avatar would be the 14th-highest-grossing film in history. On a worldwide basis, when Avatar's gross stood at $2 billion after 35 days in theaters, The Daily Telegraph estimated its inflation-adjusted gross was surpassed only by Gone with the Wind ($3.0 billion), Titanic ($2.9 billion), and Star Wars ($2.2 billion). Reuters and the 2015 edition of Guinness World Records placed Avatar ahead of Titanic after adjusting for inflation. (Note: Attributed to multiple references:)

=== Commercial analysis ===
After the film's unusually strong box office performance during its first two weeks, some analysts felt it was the one film capable of surpassing the worldwide gross of Titanic, due in part to higher ticket prices for Avatar's 3D screenings. However, Avatar's continued strength week-over-week perplexed some box office analysts. Paul Dergarabedian, president of box office analysis for Hollywood.com, said that most films are considered healthy if they record less than a 50% revenue drop from their first weekend to their second. He said that Avatar's 11% drop between its first and third weekends was unprecedented.

Various explanations have been offered for Avatar's success. One factor is that Cameron chose a December release date to avoid competition, as January has historically been when studios release their weakest films. Titanic capitalized on the same January predictability, releasing in December 1997 and earning most of its gross in 1998. Another factor is that Fox positioned Avatar as a cinematic event that should be seen in theaters, and the "Oscar buzz" surrounding the film helped. High grosses from international viewings also contributed to Avatar's success; two-thirds of Titanic's gross was earned outside the United States and Canada, and Avatar had similar success in international markets. Additionally, films in 3D accumulated $1.3 billion in 2009, a threefold increase from 2008 and more than 10% of the total 2009 box office gross, according to Variety. The increased ticket price—an average of $2 to $3 per ticket in most markets—added to Avatar's revenue. Entertainment Weekly attributed the film's success in part to "astronomic" word-of-mouth. Cameron suggested that Avatar's success was due in part to its immersive fantasy world.

== Home media ==
20th Century Fox Home Entertainment released Avatar on DVD and Blu-ray in major markets between April 22 and May 6, 2010. It set a first-day launch record in the United States for Blu-ray sales at 1.5 million units sold, breaking the record previously held by The Dark Knight (600,000 units sold). First-day DVD and Blu-ray sales combined were over four million units sold. In its first four days of release, sales of Avatar on Blu-ray reached 2.7 million in the United States and Canada—overtaking The Dark Knight to become the best selling Blu-ray release in the region. Avatar broke the Blu-ray sales record in the United Kingdom the following week. In its first three weeks of release, the film sold a total of 19.7 million DVD and Blu-ray discs combined, a new record for sales in that period. As of July 18, 2012, DVD sales totaled over 10.5 million units. Avatar retained its record as the top-selling Blu-ray in the US until January 2015, when it was surpassed by Frozen.

The Avatar three-disc Extended Collector's Edition on DVD and Blu-ray was released on November 16, 2010. Three different versions of the film are present on the discs: the original theatrical cut (162 minutes), the special edition cut (170 minutes), and a collector's extended cut (178 minutes). The DVD set spreads the film across two discs, while the Blu-ray set presents it on a single disc. The release also includes 45 minutes of deleted scenes and other extras.

On December 24, 2010, Avatar had its 3D television world premiere on Sky. (Note: Attributed to multiple references:) In February 2024, the film became available to stream in variable high frame rate in 3D 4K Dolby Vision on the Disney+ app for the Apple Vision Pro.

In 2007, Cameron chose Ubisoft Montreal to develop an Avatar video game; he would later use some of the game's vehicle and creature designs in the film. Avatar: The Game was released in December 2009.

== Reception ==
=== Critical response ===
On the review aggregator Rotten Tomatoes, 81% of 335 reviews are positive, and the average audience score is 4.1 out of 5. The site's critical consensus reads: "It might be more impressive on a technical level than as a piece of storytelling, but Avatar reaffirms James Cameron's singular gift for imaginative, absorbing filmmaking." On Metacritic, which assigns a weighted average, the film has a score of 83 out of 100 based on 38 critics. Audiences polled by CinemaScore gave the film an average grade of "A" on an A+ to F scale. The poll also indicated that 3D was the main draw of the film.

Writing in Rolling Stone, Peter Travers thought Avatar "extends the possibilities of what movies can do. Cameron's talent may just be as big as his dreams." Richard Corliss of Time thought the film was "the most vivid and convincing creation of a fantasy world ever seen in the history of moving pictures." Roger Ebert of the Chicago Sun-Times compared his experience watching Avatar to his first time viewing Star Wars in 1977. He described Avatar as "sensational entertainment" and "a technical breakthrough". Todd McCarthy of Variety wrote, "The King of the World sets his sights on creating another world entirely in Avatar, and it's very much a place worth visiting." Kirk Honeycutt of The Hollywood Reporter said the "screen is alive with more action and the soundtrack pops with more robust music than any dozen sci-fi shoot-'em-ups you care to mention". Kenneth Turan of the Los Angeles Times thought the film had "powerful" visual accomplishments but "flat dialogue" and "obvious characterization". James Berardinelli of ReelViews called the film "engrossing". Manohla Dargis of The New York Times called Avatar "glorious and goofy and blissfully deranged", and said it brought awe and wonder to the movie-going experience.

=== Thematic analysis ===
Armond White of the New York Press felt that Cameron used "villainous American characters" to "misrepresent facets of militarism, capitalism, and imperialism". Russell D. Moore of The Christian Post thought the film contained propaganda. He wrote, "If you can get a theater full of people in Kentucky to stand and applaud the defeat of their country in war, then you've got some amazing special effects." Adam Cohen of The New York Times called the film's anti-imperialist message "a 22nd-century version of the American colonists vs. the British, India vs. the Raj, or Latin America vs. United Fruit". Michael Phillips of the Chicago Tribune felt that Avatar contains an anti-American, anti-military and anti-colonialist message.

Ross Douthat of The New York Times described the film as an "apologia for pantheism", while Saritha Prabhu of The Tennessean called the film a "misportrayal of pantheism and Eastern spirituality in general". Conversely, Maxim Osipov of The Hindustan Times commended the film's message for its overall consistency with the teachings of Hinduism in the Bhagavad Gita. Annalee Newitz of io9 concluded that Avatar is another film with a recurring "fantasy about race" wherein "some white guy" becomes the "most awesome" member of a non-white culture. Miranda Devine of The Sydney Morning Herald thought Cameron used the film to promote heavy-handed ideology. Scholar Nidesh Lawtoo observed in Avatar a contemporary fascination with virtual avatars.

Critics have pointed out similarities between Avatar and other works of fiction, describing the perceived connections in ways ranging from simple "borrowing" to outright plagiarism. Ty Burr of The Boston Globe called it "the same movie" as Dances with Wolves. Like Dances with Wolves, Avatar has been characterized as being a "white savior" movie, in which a "backwards" native people is helpless without the leadership of a member of the invading white culture. Parallels have been drawn between Avatar and Poul Anderson's 1957 novelette "Call Me Joe", in which a paralyzed man uses his mind to control an artificial body on Jupiter.

Cinema audiences in Russia have noted that Avatar has elements in common with the 1960s Noon Universe novels by Arkady and Boris Strugatsky, which are set in the 22nd century on a forested world called Pandora with a sentient indigenous species called the Nave. Reviews have compared Avatar to FernGully: The Last Rainforest, Pocahontas, Midworld, and The Word for World Is Forest. Ulabi Neda of NPR's Morning Edition described the film as a montage of tropes, created by "mixing a bunch of film scripts in a blender". Writers for Vanity Fair and Gizmodo found similarities in Avatar to the artwork of Roger Dean, which features dragons and floating rock formations. In 2013, Dean sued Cameron and Fox. He claimed that Pandora was inspired by 14 of his images, and he sought damages of $50 million. Dean's case was dismissed the following year, with The Hollywood Reporter noting that Cameron had won multiple Avatar idea theft cases.

=== Accolades ===
Avatar was nominated for nine awards at the 82nd Academy Awards, including Best Picture and Best Director. It won the awards for Best Art Direction, Best Cinematography, and Best Visual Effects. It was nominated for four Golden Globe Awards, winning Best Motion Picture – Drama and Best Director. At the 36th Saturn Awards, Avatar won all ten awards it was nominated for, including Best Science Fiction Film, Best Director, Best Writing, and Best Special Effects. Avatar won Best Picture from the New York Film Critics Online and Best Action Film at the Critics' Choice Awards. It won the BAFTA award for Production Design and Special Visual Effects, as well as two awards from the St. Louis Film Critics: Best Visual Effects and Most Original, Innovative or Creative Film. Avatar has also received many other awards, nominations and honors.

== Sequels and legacy ==
Avatar's success has led to two sequels, with two more planned. Avatar: The Way of Water (2022) grossed over $2.3 billion, becoming the highest-grossing film of 2022, and received a similarly positive critical and audience response. The second sequel, Avatar: Fire and Ash, was released in 2025. Two more sequels are scheduled to be released in 2029 and 2031.

Despite the financial and critical success of Avatar, some journalists have questioned its cultural impact. (Note: Attributed to multiple references:) Writing for The Escapist, Darren Mooney thought the film had not been broadly remembered in the popular consciousness, and felt it did not have a fandom. In 2014, Scott Mendelson of Forbes said the film had been "all but forgotten", citing the lack of fandom, merchandising, and any enduring media franchise. He thought Avatar's only notable achievement was its popularization of 3D cinema. After the box office success of the Avatar re-release in 2022, Mendelson reversed his stance, stating that audiences do in fact care about Avatar. Some of the same writers felt there would not be an audience for the film's sequels. (Note: Attributed to multiple references:)

In 2022, in response to Avatar's re-release and the trailer for its upcoming sequel, journalists again questioned its cultural relevance. Patrick Ryan of USA Today said the film had "curiously left almost no pop-culture footprint". Bilge Ebiri of Vulture disagreed, believing that the film had held up well over the years. A detailed overview of the Avatar franchise was published in The New York Times in December of that year.

In 2016, the Directors Guild of America ranked Avatar 55th on its list of The 80 Best-Directed Films since the Guild’s founding in 1936.

== Adaptations ==
=== Stage adaptation ===
Toruk – The First Flight is an original stage production by Cirque du Soleil which ran between December 2015 and June 2019. Inspired by Avatar, the story is set in Pandora's past, and involves a prophecy about a threat to the Tree of Souls. Audience members could download a mobile app to participate in show effects. On January 18, 2016, it was announced via the Toruk Facebook page that filming for a DVD release had been completed and was undergoing editing.

=== Theme park attraction ===
In 2011, Cameron, Lightstorm, and Fox entered an exclusive licensing agreement with Disney to feature Avatar-themed attractions at Walt Disney Parks and Resorts worldwide, including a themed land for Disney's Animal Kingdom in Lake Buena Vista, Florida. The area, known as Pandora – The World of Avatar, opened on May 27, 2017.
