= Dirge (disambiguation) =

A dirge is a somber song expressing mourning or grief.

Dirge may also refer to:

== People ==
- Roman Dirge (born 1972), American artist

== Arts, entertainment, and media ==
=== Fictional entities ===
- Dirge (Transformers), a character in the Transformers franchise
- Dirge, a character in the Xombie franchise
- The 10th Colossus in Shadow of the Colossus

=== Literature ===
- Dirge (novel), by Alan Dean Foster
- "A Dirge", an 1824 poem composed by Percy Bysshe Shelley
- "A Dirge", an 1884 poem composed by Amy Levy

=== Music ===
- Dirge (band), a French post-metal band
- Dirge (album), by Wormrot
- "Dirge" (Alien Faktor song)
- "Dirge" (Bob Dylan song)
- "Dirge", a song by Death in Vegas from The Contino Sessions
