= Quofum =

2008 novel by Alan Dean Foster

- First edition
- Author: Alan Dean Foster
- Cover artist: Todd Lockwood
- Language: English
- Genre: Science fiction
- Publisher: Del Rey Books
- Publication date: 2008
- Publication place: United States
- Media type: Print (hardback)
- Pages: 286
- ISBN: 978-0-345-49605-8
- OCLC: 192080542
- Dewey Decimal: 813/.54 22
- LC Class: PS3556.O756 Q64 2008

Quofum (2008) is a science fiction novel by American writer Alan Dean Foster.

== Plot ==
Sent by the Humanx Commonwealth Science Council, a team of explorers manage to find the planet Quofum—which only occasionally appears on long range scans. Since the planet is outside of the Commonwealth territory their mission is deemed minor and unimportant. The team's four scientists—two human males, one human female and one male thranx—initially discover four separate, unique sentient species. Combined with Quofum's nine percent alcohol oceans, its unstable appearance is seemingly part of the nature of Quofum: every species on Quofum is seemingly unrelated—casting well-established scientific notions of evolution into doubt.

When the team's mechanic, Salvador Araza murders the ship's captain—revealing himself to be a member of the assassin clan, the Qwarm—the scientific exploration nearly ends. Before stranding the scientists on Quofum, Araza kills one member of the team who tries to stop him from stealing the ship's shuttle. Upon returning to the ship Araza leaves Quofum but quickly discovers he is not in any part of the known universe. Unknowingly he left the planet while it was in an alternate universe where it periodically hides. Upon realizing his mistake, Araza tries to re-locate Quofum, but fails—stranding himself in the alternate universe.

The three remaining scientists fall into a survivor's depression realizing their small expedition won't be missed while also lacking a means to return home on their own. They continue to explore and document Quofum's flora and fauna, documenting upwards of ten different sentient species of various degrees of technological development. Eventually they happen upon an entrance to the inner workings of the planet. The ancient race (unnamed, but obviously the Xunca) that once inhabited Quofum altered their planet when they realized the inter-galactic Great Evil was eventually coming to their corner of the universe. The main alternation was to give Quofum the ability to shift to a different universe to protect itself. They also started multiple experiments to create different diverse races in an attempt to find a species that could trigger the "Great Attractor device" they set up in the Norma Cluster to fight the Great Evil.

The solution to the problem, and the conclusion to the storyline is actually revealed in Flinx Transcendent.

== Continuity ==
Although supposedly starting in 555 A.A. in the Commonwealth timeline, and before the events to be revealed in Flinx Transcendent, the actual amount of time spent by the scientists exploring inside Quofum is unclear. While implied that the trio spent years investigating the extent of Quofum's mysterious inner workings, this would seemingly contradict the established Commonwealth timeline.
