= Running from the Deity =

2005 novel by Alan Dean Foster

- Paperback cover
- Author: Alan Dean Foster
- Cover artist: Robert Hunt
- Language: English
- Genre: Science fiction
- Publisher: Del Rey Books
- Publication date: 2005
- Publication place: United States
- Media type: Print (Paperback)
- Pages: 272
- ISBN: 0-345-46159-2
- OCLC: 57682523
- Dewey Decimal: 813/.54 22
- LC Class: PS3556.O756 R85 2005
- Preceded by: Sliding Scales
- Followed by: Bloodhype

Running from the Deity (2005) is a science fiction novel by American writer Alan Dean Foster. The book is the tenth chronologically in the Pip and Flinx series.

== Plot summary ==
Continuing his pursuit of the alien weapon's platform, the Krang, Flinx finds himself heading into the Blight—where the Krang has presumably gone—but is informed by his ship, Teacher, that repairs are necessary before they can continue. The repairs can be simply done by Teacher’s autonomic controls, but the need for raw materials force Flinx to land the entire KK-drive ship on the world of Arrawd.

Arrawd is classified by the Humanx Commonwealth as a Class IVB world, placing it technologically at 19th century Earth levels, the initial development of the steam engine. Because the planet is at such a low technology level, first contact with aliens is forbidden, a rule that Flinx once again ignores.

On an excursion from his ship while it is repairing itself, Flinx falls and injures his ankle, leading to his discovery by married couple Storra and Ebbanai, two members of the Dwarra. They assist the human to their home where he is able to heal himself with some simple Commonwealth technology. His use of such magical technology and his physical prowess—the gravity of Arrawd is much lower than Terran standard—quickly leads Storra to spread stories of his abilities. The couple takes advantage of Flinx's good will and begin to profit from the human's agreement to help heal those who come to the couple's farm. When this is discovered by Flinx he resolves to leave the planet, but too late it seems for his presence has started a war between three of the local governments, all seeking to control the new god that has come to their world.

Flinx, despite his troubles on Arrawd considers staying there for the rest of his natural life simply to be away from his troubles with the rest of humanity and the Humanx Commonwealth. Part of his reasoning is that during his time on the planet he doesn't have any of the headaches that have plagued him most of his post-adolescent life. The reason for the headaches disappearing is unclear, though it is indicated that the empathic ability innate in each Dwarra might be the reason. In the end, he knows staying is an impossibility because of his responsibility to track down the Krang.

Despite his protestations that he is as mortal and common as the Dwarra, the members of the native race pay Flinx little attention. A three-way war erupts and ends only when Flinx brings Teacher to the stronghold where the battle is raging and uses his ship's weapons to separate the combatants. During a conference after the war, Flinx attempts to convince the various political leaders he is not a deity, to limited success. Before the conference can be concluded Flinx is the target of an assassination attempt. His Talent once again saves him, but kills the assassin and several co-conspirators in the process. Flinx's headaches return after the assassination attempt. Disgusted at his poor choice of actions in dealing with the Dwarra, and the alien race's insistence at seeing him as a god, Flinx finally leaves Arrawd.

As he leaves the system Flinx is contacted by an alien intelligence that pulls him away from his search for the Krang.

In the epilogue, Clarity Held has been taken to the safety of the thranx homeworld, Hivehom where she is shown the interstellar devastation known as The Great Emptiness. Thranx galactographic astronomers have been able to track the destruction of a galaxy known as Poltebet-MH438A. The destruction is accelerating and headed directly for the heart of the Humanx Commonwealth.
