= The Tar-Aiym Krang =

1972 novel by Alan Dean Foster

- Cover of the first edition
- Author: Alan Dean Foster
- Cover artist: Dean Ellis
- Language: English
- Genre: Science fiction
- Publisher: Ballantine Books
- Publication date: 1972
- Publication place: United States
- Media type: Print (Paperback)
- Pages: 251 pp
- ISBN: 0-345-02547-4
- OCLC: 18914467
- Preceded by: For Love of Mother-Not
- Followed by: Orphan Star

The Tar-Aiym Krang (1972) is a science fiction novel by American writer Alan Dean Foster. It is Foster's first published novel and started both his Humanx Commonwealth universe and his two most popular recurring characters, Pip and Philip Lynx ("Flinx"). The book is second chronologically in the Pip and Flinx series.

The story follows Flinx, an orphan and a thief, as he loots a starmap from a dead body, that leads to a strange alien artifact on an abandoned world. This simple, chance adventure is the beginning of Flinx's quest to discover the identities of his parents and the source of his strange mental abilities.

== In popular culture ==
The members of Pink and Brown and Brian Gibson of Lightning Bolt formed a side project called Tar-Aiym Krang.
