= Reunion (Foster novel) =

2001 novel by Alan Dean Foster

- Author: Alan Dean Foster
- Cover artist: Robert Hunt
- Language: English
- Genre: Science fiction
- Publisher: Del Rey Books
- Publication date: 2001
- Publication place: United States
- Media type: Print (hardcover)
- Pages: 326
- ISBN: 0-345-41867-0
- OCLC: 45784280
- Dewey Decimal: 813/.54 21
- LC Class: PS3556.O756 R4 2001
- Preceded by: Mid-Flinx
- Followed by: Flinx's Folly

Reunion (2001) is a science fiction novel by American writer Alan Dean Foster. The book is the seventh chronologically in the Pip and Flinx series.

== Plot summary ==
Flinx has returned to Earth for only the second time in his life to search out the records of the extensive computer network known as the Shell that is maintained by the Unified Church. To do so he uses his empathic Talent to seduce Elena Carolles, a security guard in the Shell, and convinces her to allow him direct access to the most secure databanks. In the Shell he discovers a new bit of data about his mysterious past, information about the Meliorare Society, but the file containing this data has already been stolen by an operative hiding behind the front company Larnaca Nutrition.

The agent has absconded with the file to the bleak desert planet Pyrassis deep in AAnn held territory. Flinx has no recourse but to pursue in his own space ship, Teacher, leaving Elena in an emotional lurch. Once he reaches Pyrassis he finds the agent's ship, the Crotase, in orbit and apparently abandoned. A search of the ship for the missing file turns up nothing, so Flinx must pursue the ship's crew to the planet surface. On his trip down to confront the thief, he discovers that his shuttle has been sabotaged by the Crotase's AI. He crash lands far from his target, the camp of the ship's crew. Now forced to march across the desert with few supplies and only Pip, his minidrag, for company Flinx discovers the strange flora and fauna that exist on the harsh world.

The difficulty of his journey results in Flinx losing most of his supplies and being captured by a mated pair of AAnn scientists. They inadvertently reveal to him that the strange terrain over which he had been traveling wasn't just the broken lands of a desert, but was in fact an ancient alien transmitter. During Flinx's struggle to escape the reptilian scientist before members of the AAnn military take him into custody, they accidentally activate the transmitter revealing a secret on the outermost planet of the Pyrassis system, a brown dwarf star.

After escaping on a shuttle thoughtfully provided by Teacher's AI, Flinx follows both the Crotase and the transmitter's signal to the brown dwarf where an alien construct is found. He pursues the missing file into the construct where he finds the other ship's crew and his long lost sister Mahnahmi Lynx who is intent on killing him.

Flinx manages to use his mental Talent to defend himself when the Qwarm that Mahnahmi has hired attacks him. After binding the Qwarm and holding Mahnahmi at bay with a weapon, the two siblings exchange information confirming to Flinx's satisfaction and surprise, that Mahnahmi is indeed his sister and she was the one who stole the sybfile. Their reunion is broken up by a troop of AAnn soldiers hunting for the humans who had infiltrated their territory. The Qwarm is killed aiding in the siblings' flight while Mahnahmi breaks the tentative truce the pair had struck up, attacking him and stealing the transport Flinx had used to reach the alien construct.

His only means of returning to Teacher now gone, Flinx flees from the AAnn back into the depths of the construct which he discovers to be another Krang apparently also made by the Tar-Aiym, a long dead alien race. Using the Krang he fights off the AAnn and takes the shuttle that had belonged to Mahnahmi's ship, Crotase to return to Teacher.

It is revealed to the reader that the Krang wasn't communicating directly with Flinx, but with the plants that he had been given from the planet Midworld, plants that have achieved sentience and had been assisting Flinx in his adventure.

== Characters ==
- Flinx – protagonist
- Elena Carolles – a security guard in the Shell
- Krang – a self-aware doomsday device left behind by the Tar-Aiym race
- Qwarm – a society of assassins
- Pip – his minidrag
