= Icerigger =

1974 science fiction novel by Alan Dean Foster

- Cover of the first edition
- Author: Alan Dean Foster
- Cover artist: Dean Ellis
- Language: English
- Genre: Science fiction
- Publisher: Ballantine Books
- Publication date: 1974
- Publication place: United States
- Media type: Print (Paperback)
- Pages: 304
- ISBN: 0-345-23836-2
- OCLC: 1956381
- Followed by: Mission to Moulokin

Icerigger is a 1974 science fiction novel by American writer Alan Dean Foster. Like many of Foster's science-fiction novels, Icerigger takes place within his Humanx Commonwealth fictional universe. The book's two sequels are Mission to Moulokin and The Deluge Drivers.

== Plot ==
Following a criminal kidnapping gone wrong, Ethan Frome Fortune, a simple salesman and sophisticated interstellar traveler, finds himself stranded on the alien, deadly frozen world of Tran-Ky-Ky. With him are professional adventurer/soldier of fortune Skua September, the interstellar tycoon and his daughter who were the targets of the kidnapping, a vacationing schoolteacher, and the sole surviving kidnapper.

They survive the freezing conditions and the native flora and fauna in their wrecked lifeboat long enough to be rescued by representatives of the local feudal government, who are facing a crisis of their own. The survivors' arrival, along with the valuable worked metal of their lifeboat, coincides with an upcoming visit from the Horde. This nomadic group raids various city-states every one to two years, demanding tribute in exchange for sparing the community, and attacks it when tribute is not paid. This time, the locals have decided to fight back.

Fortune and his companions soon realize that their only hope of reaching the planet's sole interstellar outpost—a year's perilous journey away by local wind-driven ice-rafts—lies in actively supporting their hosts in their fight for survival.
