= Mid-Flinx =

1995 novel by Alan Dean Foster

- First edition
- Author: Alan Dean Foster
- Cover artist: Bob Eggleton
- Language: English
- Genre: Science fiction
- Publisher: Del Rey Books
- Publication date: 1995
- Publication place: United States
- Media type: Print (Paperback)
- Pages: 352
- ISBN: 0-345-40644-3
- OCLC: 35827933
- Preceded by: Flinx in Flux
- Followed by: Reunion

Mid-Flinx (1995) is a science fiction novel by American writer Alan Dean Foster. The book is the sixth chronologically in the Pip and Flinx series.

== Plot introduction ==
As the story opens, Flinx is at loose ends, looking for peace and quiet on a backwater world. But the local bully takes a shine to Flinx's longtime companion, an empathic and poisonous flying snake, or minidrag, and insists on buying it.

When the situation becomes life-threatening, Flinx and his snake, Pip, flee the planet, instructing the space ship to fly into random uncharted space. The ship takes them to a supposedly undiscovered planet, covered with jungle a mile thick. (An earlier Commonwealth venture there appears in Foster's 1975 novel Midworld.) Flinx exits his lander - and is nearly killed by a huge, transparent flying creature.

But something draws him on to explore this lush and beautiful world where the flowers have hidden teeth and even the water may reach up and grab you; for the first time in years, his headaches are gone. Risking death with every cautious step, he is finally rescued from a most ingenious botanical predator by a band of humans - descendants of a lost colony ship long forgotten. Flinx has a liaison with one of them.

These humans have companions, not pets, but apparently native creatures whose lives are bound inextricably (unto death) with their particular human. And they and the humans have some sort of peculiar empathic relationship with the planet - more significantly, with the plant life. While it does not become obvious until future novels, the empathic nature of Midworld is vital to allowing Flinx to accomplish his ultimate task.

Meanwhile, Flinx's enemies are hot on his trail—no sooner is one set apparently neutralized than another appears.

== Reception ==
Steve Faragher reviewed Mid-Flinx for Arcane magazine, rating it a 6 out of 10 overall, and stated that "I was a little disappointed with this book. Foster keeps a tidy pace going, and the adventures and mis-adventures of the hero are all professionally related, but this story seems to lack some of the imagination and innovation so present in his Spellsinger series. I found the characters a little too thin to get involved with and the plot (including special surprise twist) just a little too predictable - it was not so much that I knew what was going to happen, just that I knew when it would happen. A pleasant book, but not a great one."

== Reviews ==
- Review by Carolyn Cushman (1995) in Locus, #417 October 1995
- Review by Don D'Ammassa (1995) in Science Fiction Chronicle, #187 December 1995-January 1996
