= Voyage to the City of the Dead =

1984 novel by Alan Dean Foster

- Author: Alan Dean Foster
- Cover artist: Barclay Shaw
- Language: English
- Series: Humanx Commonwealth
- Genre: Science fiction
- Publisher: Del Rey Books
- Publication date: July 1984
- Publication place: United States
- Media type: Print (paperback)
- ISBN: 0-345-31215-5

Voyage to the City of the Dead (1984) is a science fiction novel by American writer Alan Dean Foster.

== Plot ==
Scientists Etienne and Lyra Redowl travel to the planet Horseye to study the Skar River and its river chasm, described as the largest in the Humanx Commonwealth. Horseye is inhabited by three sentient species, each with distinct perspectives on the planet. The Mai, traders from the river delta, agree to assist the Redowls for their own purposes, as rumors suggest the City of the Dead and a treasure are located at the river's source.

This treasure is eventually revealed to not be material wealth, but an ancient artifact that is used to monitor the depths of space for an approaching evil.

== Reception ==
Dave Langford reviewed Voyage to the City of the Dead for White Dwarf #84, and stated that "Alan Dean Foster [...] offers page-turning hokum as two bickering, married scientists make their way by hydrofoil up an alien river, overcoming with ease such obstacles as the theft of their boat by hostile tribes, or attacks by ravening abominable snowmen. Just to make sure, the author has an emergency deus ex machina waiting to save them from the final peril..."

== Reviews ==
- Review by Gene DeWeese (1984) in Science Fiction Review, Winter 1984
- Review by Don D'Ammassa (1984) in Science Fiction Chronicle, #62 November 1984
- Review by Keith Soltys (1984) in Fantasy Review, December 1984
- Review by Thomas A. Easton [as by Tom Easton] (1985) in Analog Science Fiction/Science Fact, January 1985
