= The Deluge Drivers =

1987 novel by Alan Dean Foster

- Author: Alan Dean Foster
- Cover artist: Michael Herring
- Language: English
- Genre: Science fiction
- Publisher: Del Rey Books
- Publication date: 1987
- Publication place: United States
- Media type: Print (paperback)
- Pages: 302
- ISBN: 0-345-33330-6
- OCLC: 15987142
- Preceded by: Mission to Moulokin

The Deluge Drivers is a science fiction novel by American writer Alan Dean Foster. It is the final entry in Foster's Icerigger Trilogy of books taking place in the Humanx Commonwealth book series. The two earlier books in the series are Icerigger and Mission to Moulokin.

== Plot introduction ==
After resigning himself to perhaps being trapped on Tran-Ky-Ky for the rest of his life, Ethan Fortune learns that scientists at the outpost of Brass Monkey have detected a steady warming in the planet’s atmosphere. This has caused something not seen in generations on the planet: open water on the ice oceans. Taking the giant icerigger Slanderscree with a crew of Tran to investigate, Fortune learns that the warming of the oceans is not an accidental or natural event.

== Critical reception ==
Jerry Petryshyn of The Daily Herald Tribune gave the book a negative review, saying that it "adds very little" to the trilogy.
