= Flinx's Folly =

2003 novel by Alan Dean Foster

- Author: Alan Dean Foster
- Cover artist: Robert Hunt
- Language: English
- Series: Adventures of Pip & Flinx
- Release number: 9
- Genre: Science fiction
- Publisher: Del Rey Books
- Publication date: September 26, 2003
- Publication place: United States
- Media type: Print (hardback & paperback)
- Pages: 268
- ISBN: 9780345450388
- OCLC: 52341763
- Dewey Decimal: 813/.54 21
- LC Class: PS3556.O756 F57 2003
- Preceded by: Reunion
- Followed by: Sliding Scales

Flinx's Folly (2003) is a science fiction novel by American writer Alan Dean Foster. The book is the eighth chronologically in the Pip and Flinx series.

== Plot summary ==
While on Goldin IV looking for new experiences, Flinx accidentally renders unconscious a group of twenty innocent bystanders when his Talent starts projecting to others in his immediate vicinity. He and the others are hospitalized but unhurt; knowing he is still wanted by the Commonwealth for his past crimes, Flinx gives a false name and slips out of the hospital, but to no less danger. He is now being pursued by the Order of Null, a quasi-religious group that worships death itself as expressed in the great evil that is approaching the Commonwealth—the same great evil that Flinx is able to sense and communicate with through his Talent.

After escaping from the Order of Null and the planetary authorities, Flinx decides he needs to reflect on his life and talk over his difficulties with someone who understands him. Since that particular type of person is extremely rare in the universe, he settles on finding Clarity Held, the woman he fell in love with on Longtunnel, who is now a gengineer on New Riviera, a paradise world.

Finding Clarity proves easy, the difficult part is dealing with her boyfriend Bill Ormann, a vice-president of the gengineering firm for whom she now works. He is eager to make Clarity his wife but she is more reluctant to marry. After tolerating a growing attraction between the two, Ormann decides he is losing Clarity to Flinx and sets out to remove the young man from the relationship. After a pair of failed attempts to warn his rival off with use of violence, Ormann is forced to act himself with the intention of killing Flinx.

Ormann first kidnaps Clarity and imprisons her in a remote cabin with the intention of luring Flinx to rescue her there, where he will spring his trap. Flinx manages to bypass the deadly mechanical traps set by Ormann, but is overcome by the particularly clever bio-engineered trap hidden in a most unlikely vector.

Captured by Ormann's minions, Flinx and Clarity are at the mercy of the thugs but their lives are saved by the timely intervention of Flinx's old friend Truzenzuzex. The wily thranx had come looking for Flinx to get the young man's insight on the disappearing weapons platform full of Krangs the Tar-Aiym had left behind on the tenth planet of the Pyrassis system (see events in Reunion). The old warrior inside Tru manages to kill the four thugs threatening Flinx and Clarity while his partner Bran Tse-Mallory confronts Ormann. When the corporate executive threatens Bran with a weapon, Bran kills Ormann with a voltchuk.

The four attempt to escape from New Riviera via Flinx's shuttle, but before they can even approach the ship, they are trapped between two groups both seeking to capture Flinx: a squad of Commonwealth Peaceforcers and yet another group from the Order of Null. In the process of trying to flee the fighting, Clarity is critically wounded. To save her and remain free himself, Flinx is forced to allow Bran and Tru to take the woman he loves to a hospital while he slips aboard the shuttle and back to his starship, the Teacher. They agree to meet up again when Flinx locates the Tar-Aiym weapons platform

Back on board Teacher Flinx is so distracted by the seriousness of Clarity's wounds that he misses the presence of two members of the Order of Null already on board. They manage to capture the preoccupied Flinx and set Teacher on a suicide course with New Riviera's sun. Once again Flinx is saved at the last minute by the sentient plants from Midworld on board his ship; they strangle the two initiates in the Order of Null allowing Flinx to escape his drug-induced bondage.

Flinx plots his next move as a return to his adopted home world of Moth.
