= Mission to Moulokin =

1979 novel by Alan Dean Foster

- First edition
- Author: Alan Dean Foster
- Cover artist: D. K. Stone
- Language: English
- Genre: Science fiction
- Publisher: Nelson Doubleday
- Publication date: 1979
- Publication place: United States
- Media type: Print (Paperback)
- ISBN: 0-345-33322-5
- OCLC: 123104526
- Preceded by: Icerigger
- Followed by: The Deluge Drivers

Mission to Moulokin (1979) is a science fiction novel by American writer Alan Dean Foster. It is the second entry in Foster's Icerigger Trilogy. The first book in the series is Icerigger, and the third is The Deluge Drivers.

== Plot summary ==
The novel follows the continuing adventures of Skua September, Ethan Fortune and Milliken Williams on the frozen world of Tran-Ky-Ky as they try to help the native race, the Tran, win admission to the Commonwealth. During their struggle they deal with corrupt Commonwealth officials and an insane Tran leader, find the fabled city of Moulokin and learn of the history of the Tran.
