= Azania (disambiguation) =

Azania may refer to:

== Places ==
- Azania, a historical region in East Africa
- Azania (Greece), a historical region of ancient Arcadia, Greece
- Azania (Somalia), an autonomous region in southern Somalia; incumbent name of the former Jubaland region
- Azania, a microcontinent that consisted of parts of modern Madagascar, East Africa, Arabia and south India
- Azania, proposed name for South Africa
- Azania, rejected name for South Sudan

== Fiction ==
- Azania, a fictional island in Evelyn Waugh's novel Black Mischief
- Azania, a black-ruled South Africa extending far northwards in Bruce Sterling's novel Islands in the Net
- Azania, a new name for South Africa in Kim Stanley Robinson's Mars trilogy of novels
- Azania, a province in the novels Lion's Blood and Zulu Heart by Steven Barnes

== People ==
- Malcolm Azania (born 1969), Canadian teacher, writer, community activist
- Azania Stewart (born 1989), British basketball player

== Other uses ==
- Azania Bank, a commercial bank in Tanzania
- Azania: Archaeological Research in Africa, the peer-reviewed journal of the British Institute in Eastern Africa
- "Azania (Soon Come)", a song by New Zealand reggae group Herbs

== See also ==
- Pan Africanist Congress of Azania, a South African liberation movement
- Socialist Party of Azania, a Trotskyist, pan-Africanist political party in South Africa
- Azania Liberation Front, an armed faction in the First Sudanese Civil War
