= The Art of Avatar =

Book by Peter Jackson

- Author: Lisa Fitzpatrick, Peter Jackson (preface), Jon Landau (foreword), James Cameron (epilogue)
- Language: English
- Genre: Non-fiction
- Published: 2009 (Abrams Books)
- Publication place: United States
- Media type: Hardcover
- Pages: 108 pp.
- ISBN: 978-0-8109-8286-4
- OCLC: 317927266

The Art of Avatar is a film production art book released on November 30, 2009, by Abrams Books.

== Overview ==
The book is an official movie tie-in for the film Avatar and features some of the concept artwork used in the production of the film. The main author is Lisa Fitzpatrick. Producer Jon Landau wrote the foreword, James Cameron wrote the epilogue, and director Peter Jackson wrote the preface. It also contains illustrations from and interviews with the movie's artists, including Robert Stromberg, Wayne Barlowe, Yuri Bartoli, Jordu Schell, and John Rosengrant.

The book contains over 200 full-color images including sketches, matte paintings, drawings, and film stills. The book details the production phase of set designs for the vistas, landscapes, aerial battle scenes, bioluminescent nights, and creatures featured in the film. Throughout the book are different interviews with the various art directors, visual effects designers, animators, costume designers, and creature designers about their roles in the production and insight as to how the pre-production artwork process worked for the film.

== Reception ==
In December 2009, USA Today chose the book as their #1 gift book in the Pop Culture category for 2009.
