= Sliding Scales =

2004 novel by Alan Dean Foster

- Paperback cover
- Author: Alan Dean Foster
- Cover artist: Robert Hunt
- Language: English
- Genre: Science fiction
- Publisher: Del Rey Books
- Publication date: 2004
- Publication place: United States
- Media type: Print (Paperback)
- Pages: 288
- ISBN: 0-345-46158-4
- OCLC: 62119520
- Preceded by: Flinx's Folly
- Followed by: Running from the Deity

Sliding Scales (2004) is a science fiction novel by American writer Alan Dean Foster. The book is the ninth chronologically in the Pip and Flinx series.

== Plot summary ==
In Sliding Scales Flinx is confounded by how to proceed with his life. He abandoned his injured girlfriend, Clarity Held, on the planet New Riviera under the protection of his friends Truzenzuzex and Bran Tse-Mallory (see events in Flinx's Folly) with the understanding he would search the galaxy for the Tar-Aiym weapons platform that has once been in the system Pyrassis. Not knowing where to go to start the search, Flinx first visits his homeworld of Moth, then broods as his ship, Teacher takes him aimlessly through the galaxy. Teacher’s AI suggests something unusual to take him out of his funk: a vacation. This is followed another surprising suggestion: that he take the vacation in an isolated world that lies within an area of space that is claimed by both the AAnn Empire and The Humanx Commonwealth; a near-desert planet named Jast.

The native sentient species of Jast is the Vssey, a single-sex species that resembles and acts much like a giant mobile mushroom. The Vssey are loosely allied with the AAnn, though not yet a part of their empire. Some members of the Vssey are strongly opposed to a closer alliance, though the ruling government seeks to bring the two worlds closer together. Flinx enters this unsettled atmosphere and is immediately suspected of being a spy for the Humanx Commonwealth. Taken by Secondary Administrator Takuuna VBXLLW on what is to be a sightseeing tour of a canyon. Either through accident or fortune Takunna’s tail knocks Flinx over the edge of the canyon and to his death.

Flinx manages to survive the fall, but with a head injury causing amnesia. He wanders the Jast desert for several days before being rescued by a Chraluuc, a member of a most unusual organization: an AAnn artist colony known as the Tier of Ssaiinn. Considered outcasts by AAnn society, Flinx is safe among these aliens, so safe that he is actually adopted by the Tier under the name Flinx LLVVRXX once he proves to them he has the soul of an artist.

Meanwhile, back in the cities of Jast, an insurrection is ongoing as a faction of Vssey start a bombing campaign against the AAnn. Based on his success in getting rid of the supposed Commonwealth spy Flinx, Takuuna is given the assignment of tracking down this disruptive element. Although he uses the best of AAnn intimidation and hunting techniques, his mission is a failure until a bit of luck and a low-level functionary delivers the name of the one and only terrorist. Fortune also provides him with the location of Flinx, the human he thought he had killed.

Takuuna travels to the Tier to arrest Flinx, but finds his efforts thwarted by the Tier’s unusual Imperial charter. Nevertheless, he manages to get special authorization to arrest one of their members and forces Flinx into hiding in canyon where the artist group is creating a group project. Cornered, Flinx and Chraluuc seek safety in a Tier built shelter, but circumstances arise allowing one of Takuuna’s soldiers to kill Chraluuc. The shock of seeing his friend killed allows Flinx to respond, instinctively, with his empathic Talent, knocking out Takuuna and driving the soldier permanently insane.

His memory restored, Flinx is able to contact Teacher and leave the troubled world of Jast. Takuuna is airlifted from the Tier, but his transport is sabotaged by the singular Vssey terrorist killing him and destroying the AAnn Authority’s transportation annex. Flinx decides he has had enough of a vacation—from the Commonwealth and himself—and heads back to his home territory.
