= Sentenced to Prism =

1985 novel by Alan Dean Foster

- Author: Alan Dean Foster
- Cover artist: Barclay Shaw
- Language: English
- Genre: Science fiction
- Publisher: Del Rey Books
- Publication date: 1985
- Publication place: United States
- Media type: Print (paperback)
- Pages: 273
- ISBN: 0-345-31980-X
- OCLC: 12410674
- LC Class: 85-90718

Sentenced to Prism (1985) is a science fiction novel by American writer Alan Dean Foster, a stand-alone entry in his Humanx Commonwealth series of books. Like many of his books, Foster creates an extraordinary world that he tries to make unlike anything ever seen by his readers by creating a primarily silicon-based planet with almost everything seeming to be made from crystals, glass, and reflective surfaces.

== Plot ==
Set in the Humanx Commonwealth, Prism is a unique planet because its ecosystem contains both silicon-based and carbon-based life. Evan Orgell, a management troubleshooter sent to Prism to investigate the disappearance of a research group, finds himself fighting for his survival in this strange crystalline environment after his specialized environment suit succumbs to the local elements. Leaving behind his mechanized suit, Evan is for the first time in his life exposed to a hostile environment without the protection of his suit and must rely on the unexpected help of the native sentient life to survive.

With the help of a caterpillar-like creature named A Surface of Fine Azure-Tinted Reflection With Pyroxin Dendritic Inclusions (which Evan chooses to call simply "Azure"), he must overcome his prejudices, his assumptions, and his preoccupations to relearn what life, communication, companionship, government, and even his own bodily form mean to him. He and his friends must overcome multiple treacherous acts by his own race in order to survive and thrive on the planet.
