= Orphan Star =

1977 novel by Alan Dean Foster

- First edition
- Author: Alan Dean Foster
- Cover artist: Darrell K. Sweet
- Language: English
- Genre: Science fiction
- Publisher: Del Rey Books
- Publication date: 1977
- Publication place: United States
- Media type: Print (paperback)
- Pages: 240
- ISBN: 0-345-46104-5
- OCLC: 53936118
- Preceded by: The Tar-Aiym Krang
- Followed by: The End of the Matter

Orphan Star (1977) is a science fiction novel by American writer Alan Dean Foster. The book is Foster's eighteenth published book, his fifth original novel, and is chronologically the third entry in the Pip and Flinx series. Bloodhype (1973) was the second novel to include Pip and Flinx, but it is eleventh chronologically in the series and the two characters had a relatively small part in that novel's plot.

== Plot summary ==
The novel takes place in 550 A.A. (After Amalgamation in Foster’s timeline, 2950 AD). Flinx, no longer a poor orphan, is chasing a merchant to Hivehom and Terra in search of information about his parentage. Along the way Flinx is joined by Sylzenzuzex, a female Thranx member of the Commonwealth Church. His chase leads him to Ulru-Ujurr, a planet under Edict from the United Church, ostensibly because it contains a highly intelligent telepathic race. On Ulru-Ujurr, he discovers the mystery of his parentage and jump-starts the childlike Ulru-Ujurrians on their "Game of Civilization".
