= The End of the Matter =

1977 science fiction novel by Alan Dean Foster

- Author: Alan Dean Foster
- Cover artist: Darrell K. Sweet
- Language: English
- Genre: Science fiction
- Publisher: Del Rey Books
- Publication date: 1977
- Publication place: United States
- Media type: Print (paperback)
- ISBN: 0-345-29594-3
- Preceded by: Orphan Star
- Followed by: Flinx in Flux

The End of the Matter (1977) is a science fiction novel by American writer Alan Dean Foster. The book is fourth chronologically in the Pip and Flinx series.

== Plot summary ==
The novel takes place immediately after Orphan Star with Flinx taking his new space ship, the Teacher, built by the Ulru-Ujurrians, to Alaspin, the home planet of his minidrag Pip, in search of the man who bid on him when Flinx was a child in a slave auction.

He not only finds this man, Skua September, but also acquires a strange new alien pet, Abalamahalamatandra (Ab for short), and is pursued by an assassin squad called the Qwarm. Flinx's friends Bran Tse-Mallory and Truzenzuzex show up looking for Ab in the hope of finding an ancient weapon, thought to possibly be capable of stopping a rogue black hole, before the three inhabited planets on the black hole's course are sucked in.
