= The Howling Stones =

1997 novel by Alan Dean Foster

- Author: Alan Dean Foster
- Cover artist: Bob Eggleton
- Language: English
- Genre: Science fiction
- Publisher: Del Rey Books
- Publication date: January 1997
- Publication place: United States
- Media type: Print (hardcover)
- Pages: 331 pp
- ISBN: 0-345-40645-1
- OCLC: 38116558

The Howling Stones is a 1997 science fiction novel by American writer Alan Dean Foster.

== Plot summary ==
Two scientists race against their vicious alien nemesis, the AAnn, to secure a treaty for mining rights on the newly discovered planet Senisran, an oddity of mostly ocean dotted with thousands of islands. The aboriginal natives' sacred stones are found to have an immense power that the humans and the AAnn will do almost anything to obtain.
