= Cachalot (novel) =

1980 novel by Alan Dean Foster

- Author: Alan Dean Foster
- Cover artist: Darrell K. Sweet
- Language: English
- Series: Humanx Commonwealth
- Genre: Science fiction
- Publisher: Del Rey Books
- Publication date: April 1980
- Publication place: United States
- Media type: Print (paperback)
- Pages: 275 pp
- ISBN: 0-345-28066-0
- OCLC: 6456510
- LC Class: CPB Box no. 1874 vol. 6

Cachalot (1980) is a science fiction novel by American writer Alan Dean Foster.

== Plot summary ==
Cachalot is an ocean planet where humans have begun building floating cities. It is also the same planet where all of Earth's cetaceans were transplanted six hundred years ago after the Covenant of Peace was enacted with all intelligence-enhanced ocean dwellers. Four of these cities have been destroyed when a middle-aged scientist and her late-teen daughter are dispatched to the planet to discover the source of the attacks.

The novel title comes from the French word cachalot, meaning sperm whale. This word was applied to the sperm whale when the mammals were actively hunted in Earth's oceans.

The novel features a new musical instrument called "neurophon" producing not only tunes but also nerve sensations on human skin and irritating alien creatures found on the planet.
