= Flinx in Flux =

1988 novel by Alan Dean Foster

- First edition
- Author: Alan Dean Foster
- Cover artist: Darrell K. Sweet
- Language: English
- Genre: Science fiction
- Publisher: Del Rey Books
- Publication date: 1988
- Publication place: United States
- Media type: Print (paperback)
- Pages: 324
- ISBN: 0-345-34363-8
- OCLC: 18211748
- LC Class: CPB Box no. 1744 vol. 10
- Preceded by: The End of the Matter
- Followed by: Mid-Flinx

Flinx in Flux (1988) is a science fiction novel by American writer Alan Dean Foster. The book is fifth chronologically in the Pip and Flinx series.

Flinx finds a woman unconscious on a riverbank deep in the jungles of Alaspin where he has gone to release Pip's offspring. The woman, Clarity Held, turns out to be a research scientist last working on the inhospitable world of Longtunnel. He returns Clarity to her research station, only to encounter his old friends, the Ulru-Ujurrians, who help him psychically touch the threat that drove the ancient alien race, the Xunca, from the known universe.

== Synopsis ==
The book opens upon a meeting of ecological fanatics plotting against operations on Longtunnel. Lifeforms are being modified by gengineers, and they intend to stop the perversion of nature. The scene switches to Alaspin. Flinx has returned to the planet to release Pip's offspring into the wild. The minidrag became pregnant in The End of the Matter. While returning to town, Flinx's empathic abilities detect someone hurt nearby. Flinx discovers a woman, badly hurt, and with bruises that suggest interrogation of some sort. He returns to town, but no one seems to know of a missing woman. He takes her to his hotel and she regains consciousness and reveals herself to be Clarity Held. She explains that she is a gengineer working for Coldstripe on Longtunnel. Fanatics attempting to stop the work kidnapped her. This sparks uncertainty in Flinx, due to his past of genetic alteration by the Meliorare Society.

Later, while sleeping, people in chameleon suits attack them in the hotel. Flinx and Clarity escape and return to Alaspinport, where Flinx smuggles Clarity onto the Teacher, his personal ship in order to return her to Longtunnel. On the voyage, their relationship becomes romantic.

They land on Longtunnel and Clarity begins showing Flinx around the facilities. All structures are contained in an extensive cavern system since the surface is inhospitable. The caverns are home to a wide variety of flora and fauna that redefine the preconceived Humanx notions of evolution and possible lifeforms. Clarity introduces Flinx to Alynasmolia Vandervort, the leader of the Coldstripe compound.

Flinx stays to learn more about the operation. Clarity and Flinx begin to fall in love, but Flinx is not used to this kind of attachment. Flinx attempts to push Clarity away by confiding in her that the Meliorare Society has manipulated him. During the discussion, an explosion rocks the facility. The fanatics have somehow found the facilities and are destroying everything in sight. Flinx and Clarity flee deeper into the cave with minimal supplies to wait out the attack. However, more explosions rock the facility, and they discover that the fanatics have collapsed the tunnels.

Flinx and Clarity have no choice but to continue through the caves in hope of discovering a way out. In the tunnels, they meet an injured thranx, Sowelmanu, and help him recover enough to go with them. Flinx trips after they take an unexpected slide to another level of the caves, and breaks their last light. In the darkness, Flinx detects a sentient creature in the blackness that feels nothing but peaceful intentions. The aliens turn out to be empathic like Flinx and identify themselves as the Sumacrea. They communicate with Flinx through complex descriptive emotions, allowing Flinx to hone his skills. Eventually, the aliens lead them back to the Humanx settlement.

Clarity and Sowelmanu reunite with their fellow scientists, and Flinx discusses the ordeal with Alynasmolia Vandervort. Clarity discloses Flinx's special abilities to Vandervort. Vandervort cautions Clarity about becoming too close to Flinx due to his unpredictable and possibly dangerous gene modifications. Meanwhile, Flinx is asked to take wounded survivors to a nearby planet, Gorisa, which has better medical facilities. Clarity begins distancing herself from Flinx, and he realizes she fears him.

Clarity and Vandervort accompany Flinx on the journey to Gorisa. Later, Clarity visits Vandervort only to find that Flinx and Pip have been rendered unconscious by sleeping gas and are in a container. Vandervort intends to study Flinx and convinces Clarity that she has no choice but to help. As they begin to leave, fanatics arrive to "save" Flinx and return him to true normal form. A firefight ensues and Flinx's container is damaged. He begins having strange dreams. He regains consciousness and escapes the container. While in the container, Flinx's powers have developed again. He projects intense fear into the combatants, rendering them unconscious.

Clarity and Flinx reunite, but suddenly the ground beneath them erupts. Several of Flinx's old friends, the Ulru-Ujurrians, emerge and ask for Flinx's assistance in understanding a new threat that could end all life. They have discovered an alarm on Horseye that warns of impending danger, but all else is unknown. They project Flinx's consciousness across space, and he finds something terrible and incomprehensible. He returns to his body and decides his mission in life is to do something about this horrible threat. He promises the Ujurrians that he will learn more about the danger, and then they will meet again. He extends an invitation to Clarity to accompany him on his journey to understand himself and this new threat, but she declines, needing a break.
