= Drowning World =

2003 novel by Alan Dean Foster

- Author: Alan Dean Foster
- Language: English
- Genre: Science fiction
- Publisher: Del Rey Books
- Publication date: 2003
- Publication place: United States
- Media type: Print (Paperback)
- Pages: 336
- ISBN: 0-345-45036-1
- OCLC: 53378699

Drowning World (2003) is a science fiction novel by American writer Alan Dean Foster.

== Plot summary ==
On the planet Fluva, rains that leave the planet uninhabitable also make it a hotspot rare botanical specimens. When the human bio-prospector Shadrach Hasselemoga crashes in the remote and deadliest place on Fluva; the Viisiiviisii. The only crew available to search for him is the warrior Jemunu-jah, one of the native Sakuntala, and the immigrant Deyzara trader and pilot, Masurathoo. The couple promptly crash. While the rescuers and the rescued are all moving out of the ultimate rain forest, the reptilian AAnn empire is making trouble between the Sakuntula and the Deyzara. This leaves Commonwealth administrator Lauren Matthias in difficulty, with refugees swarming into its limited facilities and the bodies of civilians piling up, with few resources to help. But it's the survivors of the rain forest who bring new knowledge that helps save Fluva, along with work by Matthias.

== Literary significance and reception ==
Regina Schroeder in her review for Booklist said "Driven by political intrigue and wilderness adventure, this is SF of noble vintage." Kirkus Reviews summarized this novel as "a Cold War-style superpower confrontation-by-proxy, tricked out in weird-alien garb: no prizes for style, but satisfyingly substantial." Peter Cannon gave this book a mixed review in Publishers Weekly saying "the human characters are notably less developed than the aliens, and the AAn Empire is something of a straw foe these days, but the author's mastery of his exotic setting cannot be denied."
