= Islands in the Net =

1988 novel by Bruce Sterling

- Cover of first edition (hardcover)
- Author: Bruce Sterling
- Language: English
- Genre: Science fiction
- Publisher: Arbor House
- Publication date: 1988
- Publication place: United States
- Media type: Print (Hardcover & Paperback)
- Pages: 348
- ISBN: 0-87795-952-8
- OCLC: 17442235
- Dewey Decimal: 813/.54 19
- LC Class: PS3569.T3876 I8 1988

Islands in the Net is a 1988 science fiction novel by American writer Bruce Sterling. It won the John W. Campbell Memorial Award for Best Science Fiction Novel in 1989, and was nominated for both the Hugo and Locus Awards that same year. It offers a view of an early 21st century world, apparently peaceful, with delocalised, networking corporations. The protagonist, swept up in events beyond her control, finds herself in places that are off the net, from a datahaven in Grenada, to a Singapore under terrorist attack, to the poorest and most disaster-struck parts of Africa.

In the story, the fictional book The Lawrence Doctrine and Postindustrial Insurgency, named after Lawrence of Arabia, is banned because it deals directly with methods and tactics of an insurgent rebellion.

== Plot summary ==
The action takes place in 2023–2025 in Galveston, Texas; Atlanta, Georgia; Grenada, an island on the northeast coast of South America; Singapore; and Africa. Protagonist Laura Webster, mother of three-month-old Loretta, works as a public relations employee for Rizome, a global corporation of economic democrats. Together with her husband David they run the Lodge, a resort for Rizome workers on the island of Galveston.

The action sets off when Rizome organizes a conference between itself and three data havens – EFT Commerzbank of Luxembourg, The Young Soo Chim Islamic Bank and Grenada United Bank – in the Lodge. After the first day of the conference Winston Stubbs, the Grenadan representative, is assassinated. The organization which admits to killing him calls itself "F.A.C.T." (Free Army of Counter-Terrorism). Rizome decides to send Laura with her husband and baby to Grenada on a diplomatic mission to prove that Rizome had nothing to do with the murder.

While in Grenada, Laura and David learn about its tragic history and the advanced technology flourishing on the island thanks to “mad-doctors” like the American Brian Prentis. Grenada is ruled by one party, the New Millennium Movement, with Prime Minister Eric Louison who uses voodoo tradition as a means of keeping order in the country. Food is plentiful and cheaply produced on one of the huge tankers adapted for factories and housing. Drugs, in the form of a pure synthetic THC, are also cheap and widely accessible. Laura and David manage to escape Grenada after Singapore attacks it. They return to Atlanta and separate. David takes the baby to one of Rizome’s Retreats and Laura sets off to Singapore to continue her mission to improve the world.

In Singapore, Laura witnesses the launching of the first Singaporean space rocket, celebrated by a speech by Singapore’s prime minister and leader of the People’s Innovation Party, Kim Sue Lok. The celebration ends in chaos as the prime minister spits fire and explodes, a victim, as it turns out, of Grenada’s pseudo-voodoo tricks. This event triggers national panic and riots. Grenada invades Singapore in reaction to Singapore’s previous attack. In addition, Singapore’s opposition party Anti-Labour Party tries to use the situation to get into power. The last group to invade Singapore is the Red Cross.

Ace Books 1989 paperback edition of Islands in the Net

Cut off from the Net, Laura cannot contact her husband or Rizome’s headquarters. Together with other Rizome’s workers in Singapore, she decides to get herself arrested and wait in prison for the end of war. Unfortunately, Laura gets separated from her companions and ends up on the roof of The Young Soo Chim Islamic Bank. From there a chopper takes her and other survivors of the riots to a cargo ship somewhere mid-ocean. The ship is bombed by F.A.C.T., and Laura is taken to one of F.A.C.T.’s submarines, where she learns more about the organization. She is then taken by plane to a prison in Bamako, the capital of Mali; F.A.C.T. had taken over the Malian government to provide themselves a military base. After a conversation with the Inspector of Prisons, she finds out that she poses a threat to the organization because they think she knows they have an atomic bomb, which they keep on board of Thermopylae, the submarine she has been kept on.

She spends two years in the prison. When a South African country supported by European authority of the Vienna convention attacks Mali, she is taken in a convoy to the atomic site to be shot on camera as a hostage. She is miraculously freed when the convoy is attacked by a group of Inadin Cultural Revolutionists. Their leader is Jonathan Gresham, an American journalist and radical, who helps Inadin people (also called Tuaregs, the nomadic tribes of the Sahara) fight against any forms of outside interference in their traditional way of life.

Gresham takes Laura to an Azanian relief camp in order to save the life of her convoy companion, Azanian doctor Katje Selous, who was wounded in the action. Outside of the relief camp Gresham records Laura’s statement on all that happened to her and sends it on the Net. Laura and Gresham get romantically involved, but this feeling has no future as she has to go back to the States while Gresham will continue to help Inadins.

Laura arrives at Galveston and takes part in an official Rizome party organized for her. Her husband David had lost hope that she was alive and gotten involved with Emily Donato, her closest friend, and Laura and David’s daughter Loretta is raised by Laura’s mother Margaret. Laura continues to work for Rizome and tries to improve the world by doing so. The last scene in the novel describes Hiroshima being bombed by F.A.C.T. Fortunately, this time the bomb did not explode.

=== Lawrence’s doctrine ===
In the fictional world of Islands there exists a book titled The Lawrence Doctrine and Postindustrial Insurgency by Colonel Jonathan Gresham. It is banned by Vienna and widely read in the political underground. It draws on the example of T. E. Lawrence, who during the First World War helped the Arabs, who were fighting the Ottoman Turks. Lawrence convinced them, instead, to block the Ottomans' expansion by destroying their communication lines, which at the time were railway tracks and telegraphs. Although the Arabs were successful in fighting the Turks, they became dependent on the British Empire to provide them with industrial products such as explosives and canned food. Gresham calls the First World War “a proto-Net civil war”. In Sterling's 21st century, the Tuaregs' enemy is the Net. But whereas the Arabs were colonized by the British with industrial products such as guns, cotton, dynamite, and canned food, for Sterling's Tuaregs the necessary products of the Networld are solar power, plastique, and single-cell protein.

Gresham’s book shows a pessimistic view of globalization and its mechanisms. It takes the view that it is impossible for small and economically weaker nations to stay completely independent; global influence will always be present with its positive and negative aspects.

=== Political order of the world in Islands ===
In the world of the novel the USA and the Soviet Union are still the world powers. The international political order, which is guarded by the Vienna Convention and uses censorship as a means of keeping the world order, is weak and divided, and to avoid world panic protects the terrorists from F.A.C.T. Countries that grow in power are Grenada, Singapore and Luxembourg, the so-called data havens where data piracy is legitimate. Organizations that feel threatened by the growing influence of havens are Rizome Industries Group, an economic democracy global corporation which suffers losses because of the data piracy and wants to negotiate with the pirates, and the Free Army of Counter-Terrorism (F.A.C.T.) which calls itself “the real world police” and plans to deal with any signs of attacks on “doctrines of national sovereignty”. This is the main reason why F.A.C.T. assassinates Winston Stubbs and bombs the ship on which Laura was sailing with Singaporean pirates.

The novel shows a new phenomenon emerging in the political world. The global organizations start realizing that they no longer need governments to successfully run their affairs; “Let us cut out the middleman,” says a worker for another corporation. The F.A.C.T. seems to be fighting signs of such thinking, while at the same time it is itself a global corporation which took over the government of Mali in order to have its own military base. Africa is still “a mess”. The only problem which has been solved is famine, thanks to "the scop", a single-cell protein. The countries still suffer from poverty and political instability. People die from retroviruses and have no perspectives, and developed countries are not interested in what is going on there.

== Hightech inventions ==
The Net
Similar to today’s Internet.
Electronically enhanced running shoes
Used by Laura with indicators of mileage covered by the runner similar to the latest product of the Nike and iPod companies.
Electronically enhanced Trash cans
On Galveston beach, these move towards the person who calls them. After one puts refuse into them, they respond by saying “Thank you!”
Watchphone
A device used as a watch, a phone and an organizer.
Videoglasses
Sunglasses with a video camera. Used by Laura and David on Grenada in conjunction with custom made earphones. Rather heavy and awkward.
Scop
A single cell protein that is mass produced cheaply in “protein vats swarming with bacteria.”
Sticky
Michael Thompson/Nesta Stubbs – a man whose digestive system has been modified to contain special bacteria which, after he eats a carton of yogurt, produces drugs turning him into a professional hitman who feels no pain or empathy.
Suntan lotion
Changes the structure of a person's skin and turns it black. Invented by Brain Prentis; used by David and later mass-produced by Rizome.
Romance
Red capsules containing hormones similar to those produced naturally by the brain of a person in love; produced by gene-spliced bacteria and used by prostitutes from The Church of Ishtar, a religious organization providing sexual services to men.
Synthetic THC
Produced legally in Grenada in the form of small paper plasters stuck to the skin and releasing THC, the active substance in marijuana.

== Successful predictions ==
- The Net as a means of worldwide communication and the omnipresence of computers. B. Sterling: “I think it was a grand success to realize that big, dorky geek computers were going to become incredibly fashionable.”
- The institution of data havens; there has been an attempt to establish a data haven by HavenCo. The haven was established on the Sealand in the North Sea. “...the Sealand data haven in the North Sea is similar to the data havens described in my 1988 novel Islands in the Net." It's not clear that this has been a successful attempt as Sealand has not successfully established sovereignty.
- End of the Cold War - though how it ended in the novel is quite different than how it ended in reality.
- Wearable, personal computers (the watchphone).
- Assassination by drone.
- "Drugs, in the form of a pure synthetic THC, are also cheap and widely accessible."
- The end of apartheid in South Africa, which achieves Black majority rule.

== Failed predictions ==
- Islands anticipates that the Soviet Union will still be in existence in 2023 - in reality, the USSR was officially dissolved on December 8, 1991, just three years after the book was published.
- In Islands, communication on the Network relies on one-way messaging: pre-recorded video messages and telex. It misses both the interactive nature of the WWW and effects of Moore's Law on prices. Excerpt, p 16-17: "The Lodge did most of its business as telex, straight print sent by wire ... it was cheapest and simplest... Fax was good for graphics and still photos; the fax machine was essentially a Xerox with a phone ... Rizome favored one-way prerecorded calls because they were more efficient. There was less chance of expensive screwup in a one-way recorded call... Teleconferencing was the expensive borderland where phones blurred into television."
- South Africa having its name changed to Azania after the fall of apartheid and expanding greatly in size northward.

== Source material ==
- Sterling, Bruce (1989). Islands in the Net. New York: Ace Books. ISBN 0-441-37423-9.
- Bernstein, Rob; Gordon Bass (December 2000). "Tomorrow Never Knows". Internet Life. 6 (12). Yahoo: 108.
