= For Love of Mother-Not =

1983 novel by Alan Dean Foster

- Author: Alan Dean Foster
- Cover artist: Michael Whelan
- Language: English
- Genre: Science fiction
- Publisher: Del Rey Books
- Publication date: 1983
- Publication place: United States
- Media type: Print (paperback)
- Pages: 256
- ISBN: 0-345-34689-0
- OCLC: 44853088
- Followed by: The Tar-Aiym Krang

For Love of Mother-Not is a science fiction novel by American writer Alan Dean Foster, first published in 1983. The book is chronologically the first in the Pip and Flinx series, though it was written fourth, as a prequel to help flesh out Flinx’s early history.

== Plot introduction ==
The story of Flinx is begun in this novel, exploring his early years growing up with Mother Mastiff on the planet Moth. Young Philip Lynx is purchased in a slave auction by Mother Mastiff for one hundred credits. After years of raising the boy, whose full origins are unknown to his adoptive mother, she suddenly disappears. Flinx pursues her across the rainy world of Moth and discovers she has been kidnapped by the mysterious Meliorare Society, a group known to have experimented with eugenics that might very well be the source of Flinx’s unusual talents.

Flinx is gifted with empathic powers and able to project emotions and read the emotions of others. Mother Mastiff also realizes later on that it was not her desire to buy the boy but his desire to be bought that was intentionally pushed on to her by Flinx.
