= Bloodhype =

1973 novel by Alan Dean Foster

- First edition
- Author: Alan Dean Foster
- Cover artist: Jerome Podwil
- Language: English
- Genre: Science fiction
- Publisher: Ballantine
- Publication date: 1973
- Publication place: United States
- Media type: Print (paperback)
- Pages: 249
- ISBN: 0-345-03163-6
- OCLC: 19121889
- Preceded by: Running from the Deity
- Followed by: Trouble Magnet

Bloodhype (1973) is a science fiction novel by American writer Alan Dean Foster. The book is eleventh chronologically in the Pip and Flinx series, though it was written second; the main characters only appear in the last third of the book. In the series, it falls after Orphan Star, where Flinx meets the aliens who build him his ship, the Teacher. The novel takes its title from a deadly and addictive drug, for which there is no known antidote, and which causes instant addiction followed by a long, slow, painful death unless the user continues to take increasingly greater doses.

== Plot ==
The Vom is an intergalactic intelligence described as a large black blob resembling a gigantic amoeba (although it is established to be multi-cellular), impervious to almost all energy and physical attack. Long before humans became space-faring, and following centuries of battle with the Tar-Aiym, it sheltered on a planet where the Tar-Ayim were able to trap it. By the time the Tar-Ayim empire crumbled, leaving a single Guardian orbiting the planet, the Vom was too weak to escape. After 500,000 years of dormancy waiting for an opportunity to escape, it is discovered by Carmot MMYM, a commander of the AAnn Empire. The AAnn bring it to the planet Repler for study at an AAnn base that had been conceded to the reptilians as part of a negotiated settlement of ownership of the planet; the AAnn base is sovereign territory, allowing them to conceal the nature of their work.

During this time, Lieutenants Kitten Kai-sung, a female human, and Porsupah-al, a male Tolian, have been sent to Repler by the Intelligence Arm of the United Church to investigate the newly re-established trade in the drug bloodhype (also known as "jaster", "silly salt", "brain-up", and "phinto"); it is known across sentience as the most deadly and addictive drug. Once on Repler, they make contact with the drug trader Dominick Rose, who had used an unwitting Captain Malcolm "Mal" Hammurabi and his ship, the Umbra, as unwilling transporters of bloodhype. Mal discovers the drug accidentally, and determines that Rose caused it to be included with the shipment that Mal brought to Repler; angry, Mal secures the drug on board his ship and goes to confront Rose, proposing to exchange his silence (and the destruction of the drug) for Rose avoiding arrest and mind-wipe by ceasing all production and distribution.

Meanwhile, Kitten's and Porsupah's covers are blown, and they are captured by Rose. Mal's arrival interrupts Rose's plans to torture Kitten to death by vivisection, and Mal is forced to trade the drug for the release of the Church agents (and himself). While awaiting the trade, they encounter Flinx, currently in Rose's employ as an "assistant sanitation engineer". Flinx, who has only been working for Rose's organization a short time, finds out who they are and that they are being held against their will; Flinx helps them escape.

After the agents report Rose's activities to the United Church, Rose escapes to the AAnn base, where he blackmails the base commander into promising safe passage off-world lest Rose release his entire supply of bloodhype via an over-pressurized container with a "dead-man" trigger (which would result in a horrible death for everyone on the base). Led by Mal, the agents enlist the help of another wealthy (but legitimate) Replerian merchant, Chatham Kingsley, who has discovered the Tar-Aiym Guardian (named Peot) and his machine now orbiting above Repler. Awoken by Flinx's psychic abilities, the Guardian prepares to fight the Vom again, while Kitten, Porsupah, and Mal prepare a raid on the AAnn base to capture Rose. Alerted to the presence of the Guardian, the Vom escapes the AAnn base, destroying the installation and also the surface ships of the local Commonwealth constabulary. The Vom and Guardian engage in a psychic battle as an AAnn fleet arrives to evacuate their survivors, and the fleet commander tricks the greedy Rose into returning (alone) to the base to retrieve data that could damage the reputation of the base commander. Flinx joins Peot against the Vom, but despite their combined efforts, the Vom slowly gains the advantage.

Left behind by the AAnn, Rose desperately attempts to negotiate with the Vom while it is still engaged in the life-or-death battle; instead, the Vom consumes him, and his bloodhype supply. The drug is devastatingly effective against the creature, which had proven immune to both conventional explosives and energy weapons. As its physical being is ravaged by the drug's effects, the Vom weakens and finally succumbs to the Tar-Aiym Guardian.

After the battle, the Guardian self-destructs; Flinx leaves Repler on his ship Teacher. Porsupah gets drunk, while Mal and Kitten start a romantic relationship.
