= Dirge (novel) =

2005 novel by Alan Dean Foster

- American First Edition Hardcover
- Author: Alan Dean Foster
- Cover artist: Mark Harrison
- Language: English
- Genre: Science fiction
- Publisher: Del Rey Books
- Publication date: 2000
- Publication place: United States
- Media type: Print (hardcover)
- Pages: 310
- ISBN: 0-345-41864-6
- OCLC: 44176957
- Dewey Decimal: 813/.54 21
- LC Class: PS3556.O756 D57 2000
- Preceded by: Phylogenesis
- Followed by: Diurnity's Dawn

Dirge (2000) is a science fiction novel by American writer Alan Dean Foster. The full title is sometimes shown as Dirge: Book Two of The Founding of the Commonwealth.

== Plot summary ==
It has been twenty years since the chance meeting of street thug Cheelo Montoya and thranx poet Desvendapur revealed the insectoid alien colony hidden deep within the Amazon Basin, and not much has changed.

Humanity has recently discovered the planet Argus V, better known as Treetrunk, with the intention of colonizing the planet when their survey team is visited by a new alien race, the Pitar. At first the humans worry that the Pitar will want to lay claim to the planet, but instead of wanting to claim territory, the aliens instead simply want to observe the humans.

The Pitar are a close human analog to humans, appearing to be perfectly human except for a wider variety of hair and eye colors (including blue and violet among them) along with nearly god-like physiques. Most humans almost immediately view the Pitar as perfect. This complicated matters for the insectoid Thranx who wish to form a closer alliance with the humans. Some xenophobic humans go so far as to invade the small Thranx colony in the Amazon, killing many of the insect colonists. While this causes a political nightmare for both humans and Thranx, it also brings together the human chaplain and Thranx spiritual advisor who form the United Church.

While the three races continue their political dance, a genocide occurs on Treetrunk. All 600,000 humans are killed by unknown attackers who then leave the planet. After an extensive search for the murderers turns up no clue, a single survivor is found hiding in a lifeboat on the smaller of Treetrunk's moons. Allwyn Mallory claims to have witnessed the massacre and has proof of the attacker's identity, a memory sphere that recorded the Pitar not only killing the humans on Treetrunk, but also eviscerating the females for the reproductive organs.

At first the Pitar deny the accusation, claiming that a single man's accusations are groundless, but presented with the video proof the few Pitar on Terra at first flee, then either commit suicide when confronted or attack the humans attempting to place them under arrest resulting in their deaths.

The humans form a space armada with the intention of bringing war and destruction to the Pitar's twin homeworlds. As humanity has spent its resources on offensive technology in order to support an expansionist policy, the Pitar have focused their energies on defensive technology. Their twin planets and the two asteroid belts nearby are bristling with hidden armaments. The war quickly becomes a stalemate for the humans who, even with their new Thranx allies, cannot break through the heavily concentrated and well-backed Pitarian defenses.

After some cooperation between species, Thranx scientists develop a new weapon - the SCCAM missile — and a clever delivery platform called a "stingship." Both vehicles possess small Kurita-Kita drives - the same that enable interstellar travel. These are not large enough for interstellar flight, but certainly powerful enough to evade interception. A starship's defensive screens are powered by its KK drive. If two KK drive fields intersect, the result is that the vehicles containing those drives are ripped apart. The SCCAM is designed to do just this - as soon as the drive is activated, the laws of physics cause it to automatically dive into the closest active KK field, destroying whatever is generating it. In cases where a starship deactivates its KK drive in order to avoid being ripped apart, the SCCAM has a backup plan - it has already locked onto its target, and the nuclear warhead it carries is sufficiently powerful to complete the missile's work. Although individual stingships might be blasted out of the sky, they are deployed in such massive numbers that it would be impossible to stop them all; and so a small, two-person craft - one human and one Thranx - could take out an entire warship by itself.

This proves to be the tipping point of the war, though when a ground invasion of the Pitar's homeworld was begun, the arrogant aliens refuse to surrender, fighting even when the obvious result would be death. None would willingly be taken alive, and those who were trapped either fought to the death or retreated into a voluntary, terminal madness. This results in the eventual extinction of the Pitar. Only after the Pitar are exterminated is it discovered why they had eviscerated the women on Treetrunk: they were an incredibly narcissistic people, and couldn't stand the thought of other life forms. They wished to exterminate humanity and all of the other races, who they viewed as inferior and undeserving of life. However, they were unable to produce enough offspring to mount such an attack. Their birth rate being the lowest of any sentient species in that area of the galaxy, they decided to use genetically modified human embryos to create Pitar fetuses. These would be gestated in the stolen uteri until they could be transplanted to suitable Pitar women. This would give them the strength needed to bring their genocidal plans to fruition.
