= Patrimony (novel) =

2007 novel by Alan Dean Foster

- Author: Alan Dean Foster
- Cover artist: Robert Hunt
- Language: English
- Genre: Science fiction
- Publisher: Del Rey Books
- Publication date: October 30, 2007
- Publication place: United States
- Media type: Print (hardback)
- Pages: 240
- ISBN: 0-345-48507-6
- OCLC: 136782072
- Dewey Decimal: 813/.54 22
- LC Class: PS3556.O756 P38 2007
- Preceded by: Trouble Magnet
- Followed by: Flinx Transcendent

Patrimony (2007) is a science fiction novel by American writer Alan Dean Foster. The book is the thirteenth chronologically in the Pip and Flinx series.

== Plot ==
Once again diverting from his assigned task of finding the ancient Tar-Aiym weapon that will help save the galaxy from the approaching evil, Flinx lands on the planet Gestalt, known as Tlel to its natives, looking for his father.

In the previous volume of the series, Flinx was told his male parent, a former member of the Meliorare Society, was now living on an obscure minor planet that was part of the Commonwealth. Though the information was suspect, coming from a dying member of the Meliorares, Flinx jumped at the opportunity.

Following a series of adventures, including his attempted murder at the hands of a local hit man hired by the Order of Null, Flinx finds his father. Or rather, he finds the last man associated with his creation. Since Flinx is a semi-successful experiment in eugenics, the man he finds is just another Meliorare in hiding. However, the man reveals to him that Flinx was the product of so much DNA splicing that he has no real parents; no father who donated sperm, and his dead mother was nothing more than a surrogate womb for hire.

Upset that Flinx, who does not reveal the true extent of his talents, was hardly the super-genetic success they had hoped for, Flinx's creator attempts to kill him, but only wounds the minidrag Pip before Flinx's erratic yet powerful mental gifts save his life, but destroy all traces of the scientist.
