= Flinx Transcendent =

2009 science fiction novel by Alan Dean Foster

- First edition cover
- Author: Alan Dean Foster
- Cover artist: Robert Hunt
- Language: English
- Genre: Science fiction
- Publisher: Del Rey Books
- Publication date: April 2009
- Publication place: United States
- Media type: Print (hardback)
- Pages: 398
- ISBN: 978-0-345-49607-2
- OCLC: 251202934
- LC Class: PS3556.O756 F575 2009
- Preceded by: Patrimony

Flinx Transcendent is a science fiction novel by American writer Alan Dean Foster. The book is the fourteenth in the chronology of the Pip and Flinx series. It was published in April 2009. The novel is the final volume in the "Great Evil" story arc, but not the final Humanx Commonwealth novel, or even the final Flinx novel.

== Plot ==
In yet another attempt to avoid his destiny, Flinx sets out to become the first human to live on the AAnn homeworld Blasusarr. Disguised in a sim-suit to perfectly take on the appearance of a common AAnn, Flinx successfully lives on the desert planet until his cover story unravels. In his escape attempt, he befriends a juvenile AAnn from a prominent family. He manages to parlay this friendship into an audience with an AAnn lord who has influence with the AAnn emperor. After slipping into the center of the AAnn government and confronting the emperor, Flinx projects himself and nearly a hundred AAnn lords into the vicinity of the Great Evil. This convinces the emperor to release Flinx, and grant him safe-passage to fight off the Evil.

Flinx travels to New Riveria to gather his companion Clarity Held. Clarity decides to accompany Flinx on his quest along with his old friends and mentors Truzenzuzex and Bran Tse-Mallory. Before the group can depart Nur, they are attacked by the Order of Null, who are still bent on killing Flinx to prevent his interference with the Great Evil.

Traveling into the Blight, Flinx and his group find the ancient Tar-Aiym weapons platform. After they activate the entire platform and focus its weapons at the approaching Great Evil, the wave created does little more than superficial damage.

Flinx is told that the ancient warning and alert system, created by the Xunca a billion years previously, might be the only other option available to save the Milky Way. The warning system leads them to a transport system, which in turn leads into an unknown dimension or location in space to what might be a weapon to turn away the Great Evil. Flinx and his allies turn on the ancient Xuncan device, which makes the Great Evil disappear. Clarity and Flinx decide to marry, doing so on the planet Alaspin before deciding to settle on the planet Cachalot.

== Reception ==
The novel received mostly positive reviews. Fantasy-magazine.com said, "the last book of the series does not leave one 'lost in space,' but rather with a satisfying end to the story and a thirst for the previous books."
