= Diuturnity's Dawn =

2002 novel by Alan Dean Foster

- American first edition hardcover.
- Author: Alan Dean Foster
- Language: English
- Series: The Founding of the Commonwealth
- Genre: Science fiction
- Publisher: Del Rey Books
- Publication date: 2002
- Publication place: United States
- Media type: Print (hardback & paperback)
- Pages: 336 (first edition, hardcover)
- ISBN: 0-345-41865-4 (first edition, hardcover)
- OCLC: 49058980
- Dewey Decimal: 813/.54 21
- LC Class: PS3556.O756 D58 2002
- Preceded by: Dirge

Diuturnity's Dawn (2002) is a science fiction novel by American writer Alan Dean Foster. The full title is sometimes shown as Diuturnity's Dawn: Book Three of The Founding of the Commonwealth.

== Plot summary ==
In the third and concluding novel of this trilogy, an uncomfortable archaeological alliance of Thranx, humans, and AAnn explores the well-kept secrets of the lost civilization of the Sauun on the frontier world Comagrave. After a series of accidents that occur where the AAnn are convenient for helping an injured or stranded human, the chief Thranx scientist starts suspecting an anti-Thranx conspiracy. Meanwhile, on the planet Dawn, such a conspiracy seems to be up and running, for terrorists there plan vicious destruction to crush the infant commonwealth. Unexpected players in this engrossing drama are the padres, human and Thranx, of the anything but dogmatic United Church, which ministers to both species with a decidedly untraditional religious outlook.

== Literary significance and reception ==
Don D'Ammassa, in his review for Science Fiction Chronicle, wrote that Foster "shows us a convincing array of motives and schemes, self sacrifice and obsession, before winding everything up. Another fine novel set in one of my favorite created universes." Jeff Zaleski in his review for Publishers Weekly said "If the idea of big bugs (the thranx) and human-sized snakes (the AAnn) makes you squirm, you'll have fun with bestseller Foster's latest installment (after 2000's Dirge) in his saga of interspecies conflict set in the far reaches of the galaxy."
