= Phylogenesis (novel) =

1999 novel by Alan Dean Foster

- Author: Alan Dean Foster
- Cover artist: Mark Harrison
- Language: English
- Genre: Science fiction
- Publisher: Del Rey Books
- Publication date: 1999
- Publication place: United States
- Media type: Print (Paperback)
- Pages: 289
- ISBN: 0-345-41861-1
- OCLC: 44704949
- Followed by: Dirge

Phylogenesis (1999) is a science fiction novel by American writer Alan Dean Foster. It is the first novel in Foster's Founding of the Commonwealth Trilogy.

In Phylogenesis, Foster begins to further expand the history of the founding of the Humanx Commonwealth, which began in his 1982 novel Nor Crystal Tears. While Nor Crystal Tears was a first contact novel between human and thranx, and set the foundation for the eventual Humanx Commonwealth, starting with Phylogenesis, Foster's trilogy set out to detail the events that led to the union between the two races.

== Plot ==
Desvendapur is an anti-social Thranx poet native to the colony on Willow-Wane who believes he can find new inspiration for his poetry by coming in contact with the physically repulsive humans, an intelligent mammal race that is unlike the insectoid Thranx. Desvendapur's aspirations lead him to a secret Thranx colony in the Amazon Basin on Earth where he meets a petty human thief turned murderer, Cheelo Montoya. Desvendapur is fascinated by the first native human he comes across so, with great resistance on the part of Montoya, chooses to follow the human, using him as the basis of a series of poems. The mismatched pair flee from the authorities and from a pair of poachers who wish to sell Desvendapur to a private zoo, and ultimately demonstrate how the two races can get along and work together on common challenges.

By the end, the unlikely pair find a mutual understanding. The Thranx colony in the Amazon Basin is revealed to the Earth community and the diplomatic beginnings of the Humanx Commonwealth are greatly accelerated. Montoya becomes a celebrity despite his unwillingness to be in the spotlight and Desvendapur's poems he composed during his time on Earth become wildly popular amongst the Thranx.

== Characters ==
- Desvendapur - The primary thranx protagonist of the novel. Desvendapur (or simply "Des" when in very relaxed situation) is a young, anti-social, unmated, reclusive thranx poet who is both rejected and pitied by his peers despite his intelligence. When he hears word that there may be a small human settlement on his homeworld of Willow-Wane he eagerly seeks entry, feeling that the monstrous humans will provide an untapped source of poetic inspiration that will lead to his masterpiece. In his enthusiasm he unintentionally leads to the death of a thranx pilot and takes the job of assistant food preparator for the human colony under the name Desvenbapur. Under his new identification he comes is invited to take-part in what he believes to be a journey to the human colony on Hivehom, but turns out to be an assignment on a secret Thranx colony on Terra meant as a plan to integrate thranx and human cultures. Des is the student of infamous Willow-Wane thranx poet Wuuzelansem, who was a primary character in Alan Dean Foster's human-thranx first contact novel Nor Crystal Tears. Much like his teacher, Desvendapur is willing to go to extremes in order to find inspiration for his poetry.
- Cheelo Montoya - A common thief who dreams big, Cheelo flees deep into the Amazon Rainforest after a mugging goes sour and he becomes wanted for murder. By chance he stumbles upon the curious Thranx poet Desvendapur and the two eventually form a friendship. Unwittingly, by the end of the novel he becomes an infamous figure in the founding of the Humanx Commonwealth, becoming somewhat of a mockery of fame.

== Reception ==
Phylogenesis received positive reviews from several separate sources. Most commonly praise was given for Foster's likable characters, and the vivid descriptions, and clear understanding of Latin American culture given in his descriptions of the Amazon rain forest.

Publishers Weekly gave the novel a positive review, stating "The novel will be a treat for those who have followed Foster's tales of the Humanx Commonwealth, to which this is a kind of prelude and which began way back in 1972 with The Tar-Aiym Krang, and can also serve as a splendid introduction to both the Commonwealth and its creator." Don D'Ammassa wrote that "Foster has a gift for free-flowing storytelling and likable characters, and the human-alien interplay in this one is particularly rewarding."
