= Robert Hunt (illustrator) =

American artist (born 1952)

- Born: 1952 (age 73–74); Berkeley, California, U.S.
- Education: UC Davis (BFA); Academy of Art University (MFA)
- Known for: illustration, fine artist
- Awards: Hamilton King Award, 2015; Gold Medals, Society of Illustrators

Robert Hunt (born 1952) is an American illustrator and painter. His works have been commissioned by a variety of clients, including Bank of America, CBS Records, Criterion Collection, DreamWorks Pictures, Disney, Federal Express, MGM, The New Republic, Paramount, Random House, and Rolling Stone, among others.

== Early life and education ==
Robert Hunt was born in 1952 in Berkeley, California, and attended High School at San Rafael High School in San Rafael, California. Growing up, Hunt frequently visited his grandfather, who, after a stroke, was able to use only one arm. During visits, he often emphasized the importance of appreciating the ability to do things with one's hands.

Hunt found early inspiration growing up in the late 1960s, including films by Stanley Kubrick and David Lean.

Hunt attended UC Davis, where he initially sought a degree in fine art and film making. With the encouragement of UC Davis professor Wayne Thiebaud, he later switched his undergraduate major to art history.

After graduating from UC Davis with a degree in art history in 1976, Hunt briefly taught mathematics at Esparto Middle School in Esparto, California.

In 1978, Hunt went on to attend The Academy of Art in San Francisco where he was one of two students in the graduate illustration program. The other student was Kazuhiko Sano, who would go on to illustrate the movie poster for Star Wars Episode VI: Return of the Jedi. The director of the illustration program at the Academy of Art during Hunt's enrollment was Barbara Bradley, one of the first women to pursue and succeed in commercial illustration. Hunt credits her with teaching him to turn off his ego while drawing. Hunt graduated with an MFA from the Academy of Art in 1980.

== Illustration career ==
Although the majority of work in illustration came from magazines and book publishers based in New York City in the early 1980s, delivering art from Hunt's home in San Francisco became a viable option in 1980. David Grove had forged a successful career in illustration from the West Coast and Hunt, along with Sano decided that they could as well.

Hunt's first published work appeared in 1980 for Listen magazine. His first appearance in the Society of Illustrators Annual came in 1983, with a piece titled Hidden Victims for Listen magazine. His first book cover assignment was with Bantam Books in 1984, under the art direction of Jerry Counihan, for the book The Walking Drum by Louis L'Amour.

== Notable works ==
=== DreamWorks logo ===
In 1994, Hunt was commissioned by Steven Spielberg to create the DreamWorks logo. Spielberg originally imagined a CGI generated image of a man fishing from the moon. On Dennis Muren's recommendation that the image instead be an original painting, Hunt was called in to execute the final image on which the motion version was based. The final motion logo took Hunt three months to complete and features a boy fishing from the moon. The model Hunt used for the child was his own son, William Hunt.

=== New Republic covers ===
Hunt was featured in an 11-year retrospective of New Republic covers by The Society of Publication Designers for his December 2, 2009 cover titled Trial By Fire picturing the back of President Barack Obama's head, art directed by Christine Car and Joseph Heroun.

New Republic listed Hunt's October 20, 2011 cover portrait of US Presidential contender Rick Perry as an art director pick of the year.

=== Motion graphics ===
In addition to Hunt's motion logo for DreamWorks, he has created motion logos for Random House Worlds and Broad Green Pictures.

=== Book cover illustrations ===
Some of Hunt's book covers include:

- A Million Ways to Die in the West by Seth MacFarlane
- Coming Out by Danielle Steel
- Hidden Cities by Daniel Fox
- Jade Man's Skin by Daniel Fox
- Medusa's Country by Larissa Shmailo
- Outlander by Diana Gabaldon (20th Anniversary Edition)
- SuperFreakonomics by Steven Levitt and Stephen J. Dubner
- The Outlaws of Sherwood by Robin McKinley
- The Jungle by Upton Sinclair
- Victore or, Who Died And Made You Boss? by James Victore, and Michael Bierut

== Teaching ==
Hunt is an associate professor of illustration at the California College of the Arts. Since 2008, Hunt has led an annual New York City trip to introduce students to top art directors and working illustrators as a way to introduce students to professional practices.

== Honors and awards ==
- Hamilton King Award, Society of Illustrators, 2015
- Distinguished Educator in the Arts Honoree, Society of Illustrators, 2016

== Personal life ==
Hunt is a member of the New York Society of Illustrators and is a member and past president of the San Francisco Society of Illustrators. He lives and works in San Anselmo, California, with his wife Lynn. Hunt has two children: William, who is a music composer, and a daughter who is an animal biologist.
