= Star Wars fandom =

Fans of the Star Wars film series

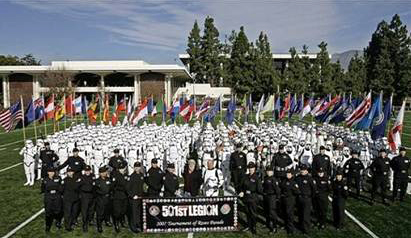
Members of the 501st Legion with George Lucas at the 2007 Tournament of Roses Parade

The Star Wars fandom comprises the community of fans of the Star Wars film series and related media. In some cases, there have been instances of "toxic fandom" within the fan community. Authors Steve Perry and K. W. Jeter have both said they began receiving death threats after contributing works to the franchise. According to Daisy Ridley, when she was being cast for the sequel trilogy, J. J. Abrams warned her that the franchise "is a religion for people." Fan backlash has evidently increased since the release of the Disney films. The fandom is known to pay close attention to obscure characters, and the Internet meme of "Glup Shitto" jokingly refers to eyecatching, but generally poorly known background characters as Wat Tambor, Max Rebo, and Klaud which have gained fan recognition.

== History ==
The Star Wars fandom has grown, changed, and expanded since the first film released in 1977, going beyond a "cultural phenomenon" and a complex major transmedia franchise, with some fans being more vocal than others. Some scholars said that the franchise faltered after Return of the Jedi showed in theaters in 1983, ending the original trilogy, with the fandom entering a "dark ages", from 1985 to 1991. It became successful, and large again, when Bantam Books published Star Wars novels, and gained an "organic and authentic cultural significance" as it brought in more generations than just Generation X. Over time, the franchise became "beloved", popular, and a "very stormy murky ocean" for fans. Online spaces created new narratives and sustained social ties and "creative energy," with some gaining communal links to characters like Luke Skywalker. Younger fans discussed the franchise on Tumblr rather than TheForce.Net, connecting with those who were familiar, and know, the franchise, attracting a different kind of fan than "legacy fan[s]."

The Star Wars saga has inspired many fans to create their own non-canon material set in the Star Wars galaxy, ranging from writing fan-fiction to creating fan films. In 2002, Lucasfilm sponsored the first annual Official Star Wars Fan Film Awards, officially recognizing filmmakers and the genre. Because of concerns over potential copyright and trademark issues, however, the contest was initially open only to parodies, mockumentaries, and documentaries. Fan-fiction films set in the Star Wars universe were originally ineligible, but in 2007 Lucasfilm changed the submission standards to allow in-universe fiction entries. Lucasfilm, for the most part, has allowed but not endorsed the creation of these derivative fan-fiction works, so long as no such work attempts to make a profit from or tarnish the Star Wars franchise in any way.

A documentary released in 2010, entitled The People vs. George Lucas, examined the issues of filmmaking and fanaticism pertaining to the franchise and its creator, George Lucas. Some scholars noted that although Lucasfilm states that it has the authority to determine the "single valid truth" for the franchise, certain fans resist this control, recutting films on their own, with the original trilogy said to socialize members of Generation X, with fans emotionally and psychologically tied to the franchise.

== Parodies ==
Star Wars parodies include:

- Star Wars Kid
- The Force (advertisement)
- Chewbacca Mask Lady
- Broken Allegiance
- Chad Vader
- Crazy Watto
- The Dark Redemption
- Dark Resurrection
- Darth Maul: Apprentice
- Darth Vader's Psychic Hotline
- Duality
- The Formula
- George Lucas in Love
- Han Solo: A Smuggler's Trade
- Hardware Wars
- How the Sith Stole Christmas
- The Jedi Hunter
- Knightquest: This 2001 internet-published film by Joe Monroe pits a Jedi Master and his two students against Darth Vader in his "ongoing quest to seek out and destroy any Jedi who may have escaped the great purge years ago." Reviewer M.E. Russell from The Weekly Standard was unimpressed with the delivered dialogue of the movie, which was shot on film, but found the opening space chase "kinetic", praised that "fights and flights are great" and that "the ending evokes The Empire Strikes Back's melancholy so well".
- Pink Five, Pink Five Strikes Back, Return of Pink Five: While many fan films have used elements from the licensed Expanded Universe to tell their story, they are not considered an official part of the Star Wars canon. However, the lead character from the Pink Five series was incorporated into Timothy Zahn's 2007 novel Allegiance, marking the first time a fan-created Star Wars character has ever crossed into the official canon.
- Rebel Scum
- Ryan vs. Dorkman
- Saving Star Wars
- Sith Apprentice
- Star Dudes
- Star Wars: Revelations
- Star Wars: The Emperor's New Clones
- Star Wars: Threads of Destiny
- Star Wars Uncut
- Thumb Wars
- TIE Fighter
- Troops
- Blue Milk Special
- Vader Episode I: Shards of the Past

== Fan edits/restorations ==
The franchise has inspired many fan edits, such as Harmy's Despecialized Edition and The Phantom Edit, which circulated on the Internet thanks to the advance of social media platforms Facebook, Twitter and YouTube. Like Harmy's Despecialized Edition, there have been various memes related to specific moments in the movies themselves, like a mistranslated Chinese bootleg of Star Wars: Episode III – Revenge of the Sith and 'TR-8R' from Star Wars: The Force Awakens. A fan-edit to visually incorporate the ghosts of Anakin Skywalker, Obi-Wan, Luke and Yoda, into a scene from Star Wars: The Rise of Skywalker was positively received for its technical execution. In contrast, a 46-minute fan-edits of the previous film Star Wars: The Last Jedi, which removed all the female characters, was criticized for sexism. A YouTuber who attempted to improve the original VFX effects of Luke Skywalker's de-aged appearance on The Mandalorian Season 2 finale was later hired by Lucasfilm. Other The Mandalorian fan-edits that were made included Grogu fighting against Darth Sidious in Revenge of the Sith, while Tommy Wisseau's character, Johnny, from The Room was edited in a crossover set within the entire saga.

== Cosplay ==
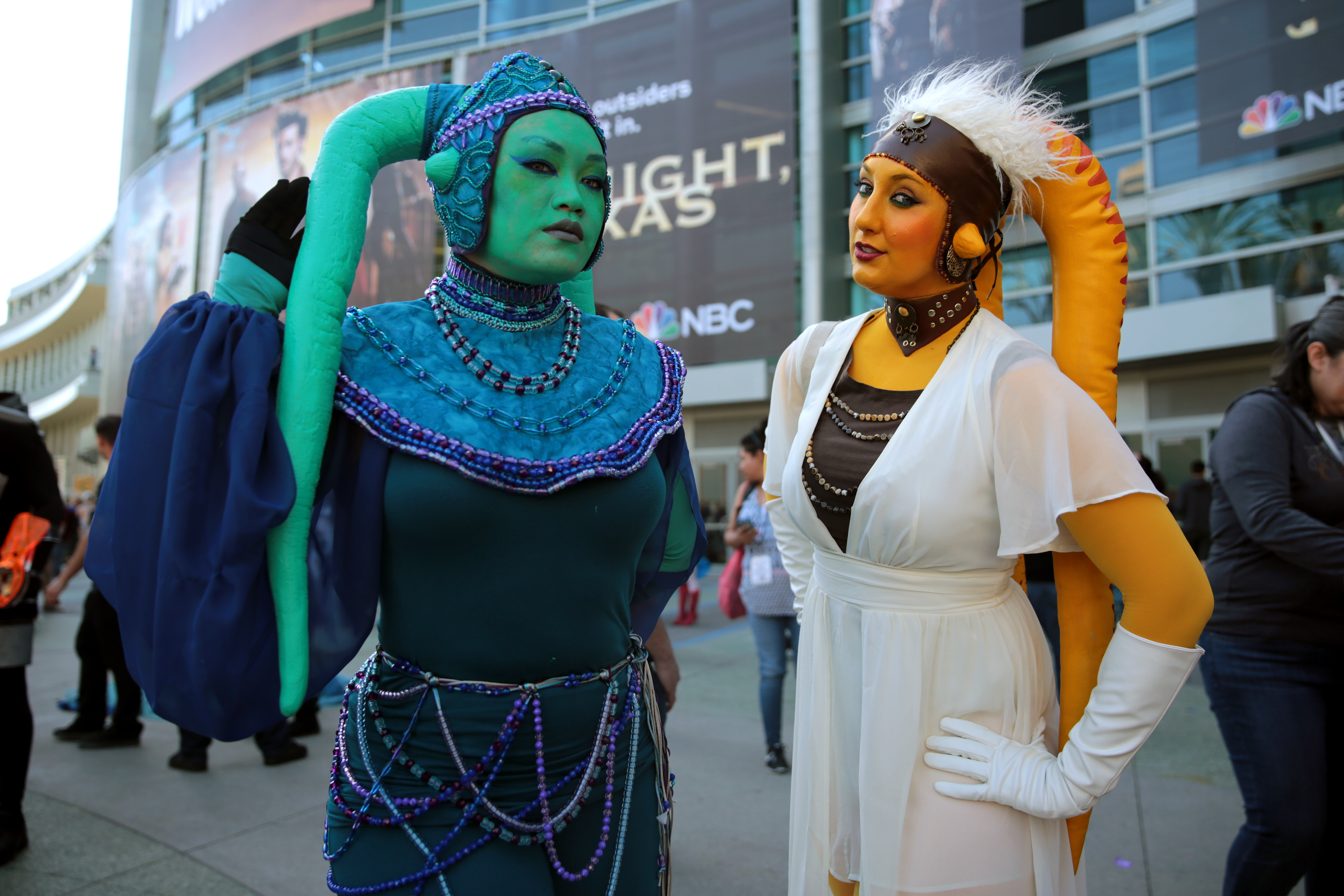
Fans cosplaying as Twi'leks during WonderCon in 2017

- 501st Legion
- Rebel Legion
- Princess Leia's bikini

== Websites ==
- Wookieepedia
- TheForce.Net

== Theater ==
In December 1978, an onstage Star Wars parody appeared in the form of a Broadway musical, The Force and I—the Mad Star Wars Musical. A similar fan-made musical of the original 1977 film was made in 1999 in anticipation of the release of The Phantom Menace and another parody musical was announced for a March 2020 Off-Broadway production.

During the winter of 2015, Chicago based theater company, Under the Gun Theater developed a parody revue which recapped all six of the Star Wars films as a lead up to the release of Star Wars: The Force Awakens.

In November 2019, Ichikawa Ebizō XI supervised production of and played Kylo Ren in a kabuki adaptation of scenes from the sequel trilogy, which was entitled Star Wars Kabuki: Kairennosuke and the Three Shining Swords (スター・ウォーズ歌舞伎〜煉之介光刃三本〜, Sutā Uōzu Kabuki ~Rennosuke Kōjin San-pon~). In addition, his son Kangen Horikoshi portrayed a younger version of Ren in the play's third act.

== Music ==
In 1993, Mexican pop singer Paulina Rubio said that for the concept of her second studio album, 24 Kilates, she has been inspired by the Star Wars movies.

Coldplay's lead singer Chris Martin said that the band's ninth studio album Music of the Spheres had been inspired by the alien Mos Eisley cantina band from the first Star Wars film.

=== Parody songs ===
- "Weird Al" Yankovic recorded two parodies: "Yoda", a parody of "Lola" by The Kinks; and "The Saga Begins", a parody of Don McLean's song "American Pie" that retells the events of The Phantom Menace from Obi-Wan Kenobi's perspective.
- Dan Amrich and Jude Kelley recorded Princess Leia's Stolen Death Star Plans, an adaptation of the Beatles album Sgt. Pepper's Lonely Hearts Club Band which retells the story of the original Star Wars film.
- "Natalie's Rap 2.0"
- "Star Wars Gangsta Rap"
- Multiple episodes of Epic Rap Battles of History feature Star Wars, notably including "Adolf Hitler vs. Darth Vader".

== See also ==
- Cultural impact of Star Wars
- Disney adult
