= Trey Stokes =

American filmmaker and puppeteer (born 1960)

- Born: 1960 (age 65–66); Nashville, Tennessee, United States
- Occupation: Filmmaker

Trey Stokes (born 1960 in Nashville, Tennessee) is an American filmmaker and puppeteer, best known for his Star Wars parody series Pink Five, and his puppeteering work on various movie, TV, and motion-ride projects.

== Early career ==
Stokes majored in Cinema Production at the University of Southern California. After working as a puppeteer for several years, he was hired as the head puppeteer on the 1988 remake of The Blob. This led to many other film puppeteering jobs, including Species, RoboCop 2, and eventually head puppeteer on The Abyss.

In 1990, he programmed the motion simulator for The Funtastic World of Hanna-Barbera at Universal Studios Florida.

In 1995, Stokes was hired as the animation department supervisor for Tippett Studio, and worked on the films Starship Troopers and My Favorite Martian (film).

Stokes gained some notoriety for helping debunk Fox Network's Alien Autopsy: Fact or Fiction? as a hoax with his article "How to Build an Alien". Stokes published the opinions of 15 of his movie industry colleagues about the claimed alien autopsy footage, and all 15 felt the film was a fake. Many, according to Stokes, found the footage so laughable that they couldn't believe that anyone in the business would take it seriously enough to even do a survey about it.

== Star Wars fan films ==
After meeting and teaming up with actress Amy Earhart in 2000 for the now-defunct Aliendog web series, Stokes began directing short films of his own, often in 48-hour film competitions. His 48-hour films, all featuring Earhart, include The Untitled Russian Film, Land of Many Uses, Fish Guys, and Double Shot.

One of the many shorts Stokes and Earhart collaborated on was a 2002 Star Wars spoof entitled Pink Five. Originally intended as a bluescreen test project, the film became an internet hit beyond their expectations. The film was featured on CNN, and became one of the most popular downloads on Ifilm and TheForce.net. In 2003, Pink Five moved to AtomFilms as part of The Official Star Wars Fan Film Awards, where the film was picked by George Lucas as the grand prize winner of that year's competition. As part of the prize, Stokes travelled to Skywalker Ranch, where the film was remixed at Skywalker Sound.

== Recent work ==
In 2003, Stokes programmed the motion simulators for Jimmy Neutron's Nicktoon Blast! at Universal Studios Orlando, and also served as an animation supervisor for the film that accompanied the ride. Later that year, Stokes directed Hooves of Destiny for the National Film Challenge, and the film won three awards, and was named one of the competition's ten best films of 2003.

In 2004, Stokes worked as a lead motion capture integrator for The Polar Express and also worked as a puppeteer on Team America: World Police. Also that year, his short film Woody Burns: A Life won the Grand Prize in the National Film Challenge, and the Pink Five sequel (Pink Five Strikes Back) was picked as the Audience Choice winner in that year's official Star Wars fan film contest.

In 2005, Stokes worked with filmmaker John E. Hudgens on his films Sith Apprentice and American Scary. He also appeared as a Tellarite in two of the final episodes of Star Trek: Enterprise because members of the Trek production crew were fans of the Pink Five films, and invited Stokes and Earhart to appear on the show.

Stokes reteamed with Earhart to complete the Pink Five saga with the eagerly awaited Return of Pink Five, which was released in 2013.

Most recently, Stokes was a consultant on Universal Studios' The Simpsons Ride and directed the webseries Ark, and the feature film 2010: Moby Dick, both starring Renee O'Connor.
