= Watto =

Fictional character in Star Wars

- Star Wars character
- Watto as he appears in Star Wars: Episode I – The Phantom Menace
- First appearance: The Phantom Menace (1999)
- Created by: George Lucas
- Voiced by: Andy Secombe (Episode I–II); Brian Drummond (Droid Tales); Danny Jacobs (Lego Star Wars Terrifying Tales)

In-universe information
- Species: Toydarian
- Gender: Male
- Occupation: Junk store proprietor
- Homeworld: Toydaria

Watto is a fictional character in the Star Wars franchise, featured in the films The Phantom Menace and Attack of the Clones. He is computer-generated and is voiced by voice actor Andy Secombe. He is a mean-tempered, greedy Toydarian, and owner of a second-hand goods store in Mos Espa on the planet Tatooine. Among Watto's belongings are the slaves Shmi Skywalker and her son, Anakin. He acquires them after winning a podracing bet with Gardulla the Hutt, and he puts them both to work in his store. Anakin demonstrates an incredible aptitude for equipment repair, and Watto decides to profit from it by having the boy fix various broken equipment in the store. He eventually loses Anakin in a podracing bet with Qui-Gon Jinn when he bets on a competitor, Sebulba, who is defeated by Anakin.

== Concept and creation ==
George Lucas was specific with the concept art team about what features he envisioned for Watto. Design director Doug Chiang described the character's design as "this conglomeration of odd things that really didn't fit, but that in the end gave him a very unique and powerful personality". Lucas dismissed concepts including a pudgy parrot by Terryl Whitlatch (though Whitlatch recalls one of her designs influencing the direction for the character) and a four-armed beast with a cigar by Iain Craig. Chiang repurposed the head from one of his early Neimoidian designs, featuring a hooked trunk and crooked teeth, and added hummingbird wings, meeting Lucas's approval. Additionally, Chiang gave Watto a vest and a tool belt, only asking for webbed feet and pants. Modeling supervisor Geoff Campell was skeptical of having a chubby alien with wings, so it was imagined that the Toydarians are filled with gas, with the wings propelling them instead of supporting their weight. Animation supervisor Rob Coleman realized that the alien's teeth would need some modification, as the craggy teeth made lip-syncing difficult. To solve the problem, Coleman broke off one of Watto's incisors, giving him a "corner-of-the-mouth" vernacular. His expressions were based on video footage of voice actor Andy Secombe, photographs of Coleman imitating the character, and modeler Steve Alpin saying Watto's lines to a mirror. Alec Guinness performing as Fagin in Oliver Twist was used as an influence in the character's demeanor. The sound of his wings flapping is a looped recording of sound designer Ben Burtt opening and closing an umbrella.

== Appearances ==
Watto first appears in Star Wars: Episode I – The Phantom Menace, the first title chronologically in the Star Wars series. He has both an ability for haggling and a resistance to the "Jedi mind trick", a technique used to persuade people. He is both a junk dealer and slave owner on the planet Tatooine, possessing both Shmi Skywalker and her son Anakin. When challenged to a bet for Anakin's freedom by Qui-Gon Jinn along with what he needs to repair his damaged ship while letting him keep the rest of the winnings, and should Watto win the bet, he can keep Qui-Gon's ship. Watto agrees due to him refusing to take Republic change. After Anakin beats Sebulba (whom Watto bets on), a competing racer that he challenged throughout the race he participated in, he was let go. However, Watto (who thinks Qui-Gon scammed him) at first considers calling off the bet, but gives in when Qui-Gon threatens to tell the Hutts of his double-crossing. Watto makes a final appearance in the sequel Episode II – Attack of the Clones, which takes place 10 years after The Phantom Menace. The now-adult Anakin returns to Tatooine to find his mother. Searching Mos Espa, he finds Watto sitting outside the shop at a small stall. They reunite on somewhat amicable terms and Watto tells Anakin that he sold Shmi some years ago to a moisture farmer named Cliegg Lars, who freed and married her. Watto then takes Anakin and Padmé to look through his records to find her.

Watto makes multiple further appearances in the Star Wars Expanded Universe; one such appearance details his time on his home planet before he came to Tatooine during a war. It also tells how he sustained his broken tusk and disabled leg. He later learns his business savvy from the Jawas, native to the planet Tatooine. In the non-canonical Star Wars comic book Star Wars: Visionaries, Watto is shown to have been killed by Darth Maul (whose appearance here predates the canonical revelation of his survival of the events of The Phantom Menace) during Maul's process of tracking down his nemesis Obi-Wan Kenobi, to gain vengeance for his defeat during the Battle of Naboo.

His son, Blatto, makes an appearance in the non-canonical television special Phineas and Ferb: Star Wars.

There has been an uncommon amount of Watto merchandise made over the years since 1999. In 2019, the Watto Funko Pop was first realized at the 2019 Galactic Con as an Exclusive. Watto has also been produced as a Lego figure and featured in the Lego Star Wars video games, in addition to numerous other appearances in the form of collectibles and other merchandising.

== Reception ==
Editors for IGN ranked Watto 78th in their list of Top 100 Star Wars characters. They wrote that he was "one of the most confusing scientific anomalies" due to "the idea that a creature so potbellied is able to stay afloat for so long". They added that he was "no prince" for his unscrupulous deals. In the book The Holy Family and Its Legacy, author Albrecht Koschorke discusses the presence of "The Holy Family" in The Phantom Menace, stating that while there was no "solicitous guardian watching over the mother and the holy child," Watto acts in a similar position as a "man who possesses patriarchal powers without being the father."

=== Comparisons to antisemitic caricatures ===
It has been suggested that the character is offensive because of his perceived similarities to negative stereotypes, such as an accent, as reported by the Los Angeles Times when The Phantom of Menace was released in summer 1999: "Audience members have complained, that Watto, young slave Anakin Skywalker’s sleazy owner, strikes some viewers as an offensive caricature". George Lucas defended his choice of Watto's accent in an interview for an American Cinematographer magazine:

It's the same with Watto or the Neimodians. The Neimoidians have a Transylvanian accent. And Watto's accent is more like an Italian accent - it's not a real Italian accent, but it certainly isn't anything anti-Semitic. It's not even close to being an Israeli or Arab accent or anything else! It's so absurd! We were building characters. ALL characters are built that way, in all of cinema.

J. Hoberman of The Village Voice called him "the most blatant ethnic stereotype" and a "merchant insect who owns young Anakin". Bruce Gottlieb of Slate magazine criticized him as well when he said: "At the end of the desert planet sequence, Anakin is emancipated but separated from his mother, who still belongs to Watto. Even in the galaxy far away, Jews are apparently behind the slave trade". Patricia J. Williams of The Nation stated that Watto was also described as a stereotype of Arabs, but that he was "more comprehensively anti-Semitic—both anti-Arab and anti-Jew." She added that Watto reminded her of an "anti-Semitic caricature published in Vienna at the turn of the 20th century."

Jane Prettyman of American Review noted that after leaving the theater, she heard two young boys describe him as "that weird little Jew guy with wings". Prettyman described Watto's depiction as "not at all subtle", and said that "it can be counted on to flush out already-formed Jew-haters among young audiences and give them permission to continue their hatred out loud."

Others have disagreed with this interpretation. Andrew Howe states that Watto's "nose seems less a cultural referent to Shylock or Fagin than to an elephant's trunk". Others have described Watto's accent as Italian, and not Jewish. Andy Secombe himself, who provided the voice of Watto, when asked about the similarities between the character and Fagin, stated that Watto is not Jewish, and the accent he used for voicing the character is Italian. He also cited Michael Ripper's performance in Hammer films as inspiration.

George Lucas in a 1999 interview with American Cinematographer magazine, defending Star Wars: Episode I – The Phantom of Menace against widespread media accusations of racism, directly blamed the press for manufacturing the controversy.

Well, this whole issue of racial stereotyping in Episode 1 is completely absurd. That was started by the Los Angeles Times, and they had their own agenda that didn't have anything to do with the movie.

=== Appearances in other media ===
Crazy Watto is a two-minute-long fan film that made its debut on the Internet in 2000. The film is a spoof of used car deal ads shown on television, featuring Watto. He offers up for sale familiar objects such as an X-wing. The film played at the 2005 Cannes Film Festival, and is a popular fan film at many science fiction conventions. The film was originally hosted by TheForce.Net, but is now part of The Official Star Wars Fan Film Awards on AtomFilms.

Actor Griffin Newman portrays a version of the character as the co-host on The George Lucas Talk Show, where he is the cantankerous, somewhat prankish sidekick to Connor Ratliff's George Lucas. Newman has performed the character onstage and over numerous streaming performances, often clad in a tight blue spandex costume.
