= Pink Five =

- Directed by: Trey Stokes
- Written by: Trey Stokes
- Starring: Amy Earhart
- Music by: Smartsound
- Production company: The Truly Dangerous Company
- Distributed by: AtomFilms
- Release date: May 15, 2002
- Running time: 4 minutes
- Country: United States
- Language: English

Pink Five is a Star Wars fan film that made its debut on the Internet in 2002 and was written and directed by Trey Stokes and stars Amy Earhart as Stacey (a.k.a. Pink Five), a fast-talking Valley Girl-type dropped into an X-wing cockpit during the Battle of Yavin, and presents familiar events and story points from Episode IV from a very different point of view.

== Reception ==
The film has proven popular with Star Wars fans, winning rave reviews and the George Lucas Selects Award in the AtomFilms- and Lucasfilm-sponsored 2003 Official Star Wars Fan Film Awards, and even played at the 2005 Cannes Film Festival. In August 2010, Time magazine listed it as one of the Top 10 Star Wars fanfilms.

== Sequels and other appearances ==
The success of the first short film inspired sequels: Pink Five Strikes Back (2004), Return of Pink Five, Vol. 1 (2006) and Return of Pink Five, Vol. 2 (2007). With each successive installment, the chapters grew in length and in sophisticated visuals. Unfortunately, the increased expense meant that funding to complete the final chapter (and resolve the cliffhanger at the end of Vol.2) was unavailable for nearly a decade.

Finally, after a successful Kickstarter campaign in 2012, Return of Pink Five, Vol. 3 was finished, and the complete 59-minute Pink Five Saga was screened at conventions around the country in 2013. Later, the saga was released online in 2016. Originally available on Vimeo, the saga has been available on Amazon Video since July 2016.

Stacey appears in Timothy Zahn's 2007 Star Wars novel Allegiance, making her one of the few fan-created Star Wars characters ever to become part of the Star Wars expanded universe.

Stacey also has a brief cameo in the fan film Sith Apprentice, directed by John E. Hudgens.

Additionally, Stacey has now been immortalized on a Topps 30th Anniversary Trading Card. Card #117 ("Fan Films") details the exploits of the Valley Girl X-wing Pilot and her faithful droid, R5-DD.

An original Pink 5 poster also appears in The Star Wars Vault by Steve Sansweet.
