= Kevin Rubio =

American filmmaker (born 1967)

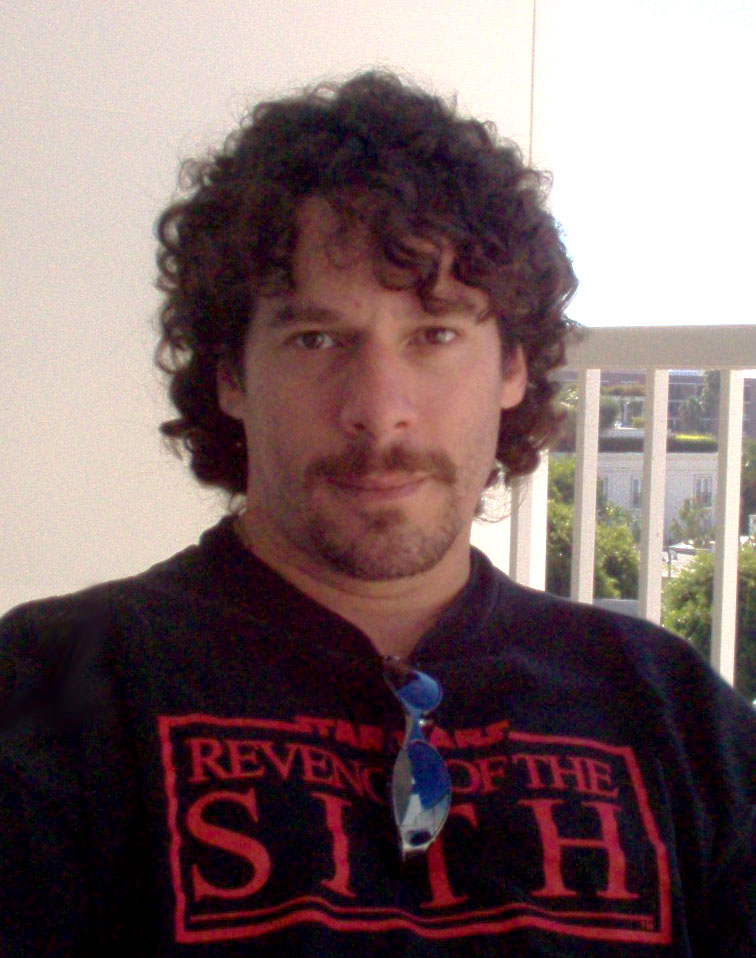

Kevin Rubio (born December 20, 1967) is an American filmmaker who is best known for his Star Wars parody film Troops.

== Education and early career ==
Rubio studied theater and photography throughout his high school years in California, and made his directorial debut at the age of 17 with a stage adaptation of Robert Redford’s Ordinary People. He spent the next two years directing musical theater in such productions as You’re a Good Man Charlie Brown and Joseph and the Amazing Technicolor Dream Coat, earning several awards for these productions. From 1984 - 1988, he apprenticed in the field of lighting, set design, and directing under George Costa, director of the San Jose Civic Light Opera House.

In 1988, Rubio attended Long Beach State University with a major in film. He almost graduated in 1991 and spent the next three years doing various production jobs.

== Film career ==
In 1992, Rubio wrote and directed Re-Animation, an animated Frankenstein short that attracted the attention of the Fox Kids Network. Based on the strength of the short, Rubio was hired to design animated characters for their Saturday morning line-up, and eventually headed up their cel animation art department.

In 1996, Rubio produced his first feature film, the low-budget Movies ‘til Dawn, but his biggest success to date came in 1997 with the internet release of Troops, a Star Wars/COPS parody that has been credited with starting the Internet short film craze. The film was later recognized by Lucasfilm with the Pioneer Award at the 2002 Official Star Wars Fan Film Awards.

Rubio has made a living since as a freelance writer and award-winning promotion producer, and has written comic books for Dark Horse's successful Star Wars Tales line. In 2001, Lucasfilm asked Rubio to create a two-part original comedic story for the Star Wars comic line, and he delivered "Tag and Bink Are Dead", which has gone on to critical and financial success. His compilation trade paperback: "Tag and Bink Were Here" was named one of the top trade paperback books of 2006 by The American Library Association.

His list of writer/director credits includes a pilot presentation for the Sci-Fi Channel (Alien Hunter - a sort of Crocodile Hunter in space), Colossor (a pilot for MTV), Action Man for Fox Kids, and Storm Watch, a pilot for the USA Network.

In 2006, Rubio was inducted into the 501st Legion as an honorary member during the 501st dinner at San Diego Comic-Con.

In 2007, Rubio was contracted by G4 to help integrate Attack of the Show with an online webcam from the site Stickam. He can be seen on the aots webcam talking to fans.

In 2015, Rubio released a Star Wars fan film titled Ackbar's Eleven.

== Personal life ==
Rubio lives in Los Angeles.

== Screenwriting credits ==
=== Television ===
| Year | Title | Notes |
|---|---|---|
| 2008 | Star Wars: The Clone Wars | Episode: "Bombad Jedi" |
| 2012 | Power Rangers Samurai | Episode: "He Ain't Heavy Metal, He's My Brother" |
| 2012–2014 | Ben 10: Omniverse | 7 episodes |
| 2013 | Green Lantern: The Animated Series | Episode: "Babel" |
| 2015 | Avengers Assemble | Episode: "The New Guy" |
| 2015 | Thunderbirds Are Go | Episode: "The Hexpert" |
| 2017 | Justice League Action | Episode: "The Goddess Must Be Crazy" |

=== Film ===
| Year | Title | Notes |
|---|---|---|
| 1996 | Movies 'til Dawn | Producer |
| 1997 | Troops | Also voiced Trooper HK-888 and Radio Dispatcher |

== Bibliography ==
=== Dark Horse Comics ===
- Tag and Bink Are Dead #1-2 (2001)
- The Return of Tag and Bink: Special Edition (2006)
- Tag and Bink: Revenge of the Clone Menace (2006)

=== Red 5 Comics ===
- Abyss vol.1 #1-4 (2007-2008)
- Abyss: Family Issues #1-4 (2011)
