= Crazy Watto =

- Directed by: John E. Hudgens
- Written by: John E. Hudgens; Sandy Clark; Lowell Cunningham; Heather Harris
- Produced by: John E. Hudgens
- Starring: Sandy Clark
- Cinematography: John E. Hudgens
- Edited by: John E. Hudgens
- Production company: Z-Team Productions
- Distributed by: AtomFilms
- Release date: November 30, 2000
- Running time: 2 minutes
- Country: United States
- Language: English

Crazy Watto is a two-minute-long fan film that made its debut on the Internet in 2000. The film is a spoof of used car deal ads shown on television, featuring Watto from Star Wars: Episode I – The Phantom Menace. Watto offers up for sale familiar ships (and objects) such as an X-wing with "genuine battle marks used in the Battle of Yavin" for $599.99 and an AT-AT for $999.99. Fans of other sci-fi shows notice that he auctions a Borg cube for $899.99, and also puts up ships from Star Trek and Captain Power and the Soldiers of the Future for $29.99 each.

The film played at the 2005 Cannes Film Festival, and is a popular fan film at many science fiction conventions. The film was originally hosted by TheForce.Net, but is now part of The Official Star Wars Fan Film Awards on AtomFilms.
