= Tag and Bink =

Star Wars parody comic series

- Cover of Star Wars: Tag & Bink Are Dead #1. Art by Lucas Marangon.

Publication information
- Publisher: Dark Horse Comics
- Publication date: 2001–2006
- No. of issues: 4 issues and 1 short story
- Main character(s): Tag Greenley; Bink Otauna

Creative team
- Written by: Kevin Rubio
- Penciller(s): Lucas Marangon; Rick Zombo
- Inker(s): Howard M. Shum; Lucas Marangon; Randy Emberlin

Tag and Bink is a series of Star Wars parody comics written by Kevin Rubio and principally illustrated by Lucas Marangon. Published by Dark Horse Comics between 2001 and 2006, the stories follow Rebel soldiers Tag Greenley and Bink Otauna, two inept peripheral characters who repeatedly wander through the margins of events depicted in the Star Wars films. Rubio modeled the premise on Tom Stoppard's play Rosencrantz and Guildenstern Are Dead, using minor figures to retell familiar events from an off-centre perspective.

The series began with the two-issue Star Wars: Tag & Bink Are Dead in 2001. A short sequel appeared in Star Wars Tales in 2002, followed by the two-issue Star Wars: Tag & Bink II in 2006. Dark Horse collected the stories as Star Wars: Tag & Bink Were Here later that year; Marvel Comics issued a more complete collection under the same title in 2018. The Dark Horse collection was selected for the Young Adult Library Services Association's inaugural Great Graphic Novels for Teens list in 2007. Contemporary and retrospective critics have particularly noted the series' use of background events from the films as setups for parody, as well as Marangon's visual comedy.

== Development and publication ==
Rubio had previously attracted attention for Troops, a fan film that reworked scenes from Star Wars from the perspective of Imperial stormtroopers. He later said that Dark Horse had asked him to develop a Troops comic, but he did not want simply to repeat the same idea. Remembering that one of his writing partners had compared Troops to Rosencrantz and Guildenstern Are Dead, Rubio instead pitched what he described as the Stoppard play transplanted into the Star Wars universe. In 2017, Rubio told The Verge that after earlier work for Dark Horse's Star Wars Tales, Lucasfilm asked whether he wanted to produce additional comics; those stories became the principal Tag and Bink issues.

The first two-issue miniseries, Star Wars: Tag & Bink Are Dead, was released by Dark Horse in 2001, written by Rubio and pencilled by Marangon. The title itself evokes Rosencrantz and Guildenstern Are Dead, and the comic similarly places two marginal figures alongside a much better-known story. Marvel later described the conceit as showing supposed background explanations for incidents in Star Wars and The Empire Strikes Back. Rubio returned to the characters in the short story "The Revenge of Tag & Bink", published in Star Wars Tales #12 in 2002.

Dark Horse revived the feature in 2006 as the two-issue Star Wars: Tag & Bink II, again written by Rubio and drawn by Marangon. The second issue shifts the parody back to the prequel era, portraying the pair as unsuccessful prospective Jedi whose path intersects with Anakin Skywalker's. Dark Horse collected the four principal issues as Star Wars: Tag & Bink Were Here in 2006. Marvel's 2018 edition added the material from Star Wars Tales #12 to the four Dark Horse issues, with Marangon and Rick Zombo credited as pencillers.

== Premise ==
Tag Greenley and Bink Otauna are introduced as Rebel soldiers aboard Princess Leia's ship during the opening events of Star Wars. To survive an Imperial boarding action they disguise themselves as stormtroopers, beginning a sequence in which they repeatedly pass through the unseen edges of scenes from the original trilogy. Their mistakes and coincidences are used to provide comic alternative explanations for familiar events, including incidents surrounding the Death Star, Cloud City, Boba Fett and the Rebels' preparations for Endor.

The later stories extend the device across the rest of the film saga. Tag & Bink II revisits their childhoods and depicts them as marginal Jedi trainees during the prequel era, allowing Rubio to insert them into scenes involving Yoda, Obi-Wan Kenobi, Padmé Amidala and Anakin Skywalker. Rather than treating them as consequential heroes, the stories generally derive their humour from the pair's failure to understand the importance of the events around them.

== Reception ==
Reviewing Star Wars Tales #12 for Ain't It Cool News, Aaron Button singled out "The Revenge of Tag & Bink" as the anthology's strongest story. He praised Rubio's density of background jokes and regarded the final exchange involving Boba Fett as the issue's comic high point.

In a 2007 review of the German collected edition, media scholar Andreas Rauscher described Tag and Bink as one of the more original Star Wars comics of the preceding years. He connected Rubio's method to both Troops and Stoppard, arguing that the characters operate in the off-screen spaces of the films and make incidental moments look different by placing them inside a parallel narrative. Rauscher praised the series' wordplay, situational humour and inventiveness, and considered its approach an example of how Star Wars stories could find new creative directions without abandoning the films as a frame of reference.

Ian Keogh of The Slings & Arrows Graphic Novel Guide characterised Tag and Bink as a conventional pair of likeable comic incompetents, but found that the premise remained accessible even to readers with only basic familiarity with Star Wars. He thought some of the jokes were predictable while still effective, and praised Marangon's cartooning for keeping established film characters recognizable while reserving greater exaggeration for the two protagonists and the visual gags.

The 2006 collection was included on YALSA's first Great Graphic Novels for Teens list, which selected 67 titles from 141 nominations on the basis of literary quality and appeal to readers aged 12 to 18. In the direct market, ICv2 estimated that Tag & Bink Were Here sold 4,416 copies through Diamond U.S. to comic specialty stores in November 2006, making it the month's ninth-highest-selling graphic novel by units in that channel. Marvel's 2018 reissue later led ICv2's May 2018 graphic-novel chart by units shipped; the publication estimated 16,656 copies through Diamond U.S. for the month.

== Legacy ==
The characters received renewed attention during production of the 2018 film Solo: A Star Wars Story. In October 2017, director Ron Howard posted an image from the production referring to Tag and Bink; screenwriter Jonathan Kasdan subsequently confirmed that he and first assistant director Toby Hefferman had played the pair. Kasdan said that their appearance formed part of a roughly 80-second Imperial Academy sequence in which Han Solo disobeyed orders and was reassigned; Howard ultimately removed the sequence from the finished film.

A version of the deleted material survived in Mur Lafferty's expanded novelization of Solo. In an excerpt published by StarWars.com, Tag Greenley and Bink Otauna appear as Imperial lieutenants attending the tribunal that sends Han to the infantry, recasting the parody characters in a more conventional continuity role. The renewed attention coincided with Marvel's republication of the comics in May 2018, which became the highest-selling graphic novel by units in Diamond's U.S. specialty-store channel that month.
