= Return of Pink Five =

- Directed by: Trey Stokes
- Written by: Trey Stokes; Chris Hanel
- Starring: Amy Earhart; Stephen Stanton; Cherise Bangs; Chris Hanel; George Manley
- Music by: Mike Verta
- Distributed by: AtomFilms
- Release dates: April 25, 2006 (Volume One); July 20, 2006 (Volume Two; San Diego Comic-Con); May 25, 2007 (Volume Two); August 1, 2013 (Volume Three)
- Running time: Vol. 1 13 minutes Vol. 2 14 minutes Vol. 3 18 minutes
- Language: English

Return of Pink Five is a sequel to the fan films Pink Five and Pink Five Strikes Back. It continues the adventures of Stacey (Pink Five) around the edges of the original Star Wars trilogy. The film was directed by series creator Trey Stokes, who co-wrote the film with Chris Hanel (The Formula). The film has been released in multiple parts. Volume One debuted online at AtomFilms on April 25, 2006. Volume Two premiered July 20, 2006 at the Official Star Wars Fan Film Awards ceremony at San Diego Comic-Con, and was released online on May 25, 2007, the 30th anniversary of the release of Star Wars.

While Volume One was not eligible for the Official Star Wars Fan Film Awards due to combination of a longer running time and the use of union actors, it was presented as "out of competition feature" due to the long connection of the cast and crew with Atomfilms. Due to a loosening of rules and the change of the Atomfilms contest to a freeform "challenge", Volume Two, filmed at Henry Cowell Redwoods State Park in Felton, CA, was entered in the 2007 competition at the Star Wars convention Celebration 4, where it failed to win an award. It did inspire a model railroad exhibit in the Henry Cowell Redwoods Nature Store.

In September 2012, funds for Return of Pink Five: Volume Three were successfully raised via Kickstarter and the completed saga was screened at several conventions in 2013. The complete five-episode saga was released on Amazon Video in July 2016.

== Storyline ==
Volume One opens with Stacey serving in the court of Jabba the Hutt on Tatooine, where she dons the famous metal bikini to rescue Han Solo from carbonite. However, Princess Leia, Solo's new girlfriend, manages to rescue him first. Disgusted by Han's affection towards Leia, Stacey abandons the rebels and travels to the second Death Star. While waiting for the Emperor, she duels with Darth Vader before letting slip the Rebels plans to attack the station, and the fact that Leia is actually Vader's daughter. Volume One ends on a cliffhanger, with Stacey apparently signing on as the Emperor's new apprentice.

Volume Two opens with the arrival of the Rebel fleet at the Death Star. After a brief entreaty from the ghost of Obi-Wan Kenobi, Stacey heads to the surface to "rescue" Han again. She enlists C-3PO, R2-D2 and the Ewoks as a diversion, but abandons the rescue attempt after overhearing Solo tell the princess of his love. Afterward, she learns from the spirit of Yoda that the rebels are unaware of a second shield around the Death Star reactor. The film ends on yet another cliffhanger as she is manipulated by Yoda into returning to the Death Star to deactivate the second shield.

Volume Three opens with Stacey and her new droid R5-DD (who she first met in Volume One) flying in Stacey's X-Wing back to the Death Star, deactivating the second shield while fending off stormtroopers. Later, she finds Palpatine still clinging to a ledge for life (after having been thrown down a pit by Vader) and fails to hold on to him (possibly intentionally). After barely escaping the Death Star before it blew up, a singed Stacey and R5-DD crash-land on Endor, where she sees Han and Leia once more embracing and confessing their love for one another. Finally accepting the loss and moving on, Stacey finds Luke at Vader's funeral pyre and starts making romantic overtures toward him. A nearby ghostly Obi-Wan and Yoda place bets on how long the relationship will last, with Obi-Wan thinking that the rebound relationship will last less than six months.
