= The Formula (2002 film) =

- Directed by: Chris Hanel; Stephen Phelan
- Written by: Stephen Phelan; Chris Hanel
- Produced by: Chris Anderson; Gordie Felger; Jason Handley; Brian Hanel; Chris Hanel; Joan Hanel; Loren Hanel; Marie Hanel; Mark Hogge; Justin Whitlock; Al Willet
- Starring: Chris Hanel; Abe Peterka; Justin Whitlock; Rebecca Peterka
- Cinematography: L.P. Stephen Phelan
- Edited by: Steve Phelan
- Production company: Digital Llama Productions
- Distributed by: TheForce.net
- Release date: June 1, 2002
- Running time: 53 minutes
- Country: United States
- Language: English
- Budget: $2,000

The Formula is a fan film that premiered online in 2002. Made in Iowa by a group of friends over 18 months, the movie documents a Star Wars fan's attempt to make an epic fan film of his own, only to become disillusioned by the process and turn on his friends. The movie centers on the motivations of fan filmmakers, and proved popular for encouraging other would-be filmmakers to not give up their own projects and enjoy the process.

The Formula has been featured as a leading representative of the fanfilm genre, with print references in The Weekly Standard and The Times. It eventually screened theatrically, showing as an official selection at the 2003 Cedar Rapids Film Festival. Film Threat gave it a five-star (out of five) review, calling it "a great surprise to those seeking out a good Star Wars fanfilm that's not made up exclusively of angst-filled Jedi, stormtroopers, over the top villains, or whatever the norm is nowadays.".

The Formula was the first film for directors Chris Hanel and Stephen Phelan, and both have gone on to filmmaking careers. Besides working as a video game designer, Chris Hanel also co-wrote and served as the VFX Supervisor for the series Return of Pink Five.

The film is also notable because it was the first visual effects collaboration of Ryan Wieber and Michael Scott, who went on to create the popular lightsaber fight Ryan vs. Dorkman.

== Plot ==
The film begins with the opening credits of a typical Star Wars fanfilm entitled "Bond of the Force". Gregory (Abe Peterka) plays Jacen Solo, and Jennifer (Rebecca Peterka) plays the offscreen voice of Jaina Solo. Jacen is on a forest planet searching for Anakin Solo, but only encountering a Sith Lord named Darth Katai, played by Zarth (Justin Whitlock). The two begin to duel, and it is an intense battle...until Greg misses his cue, incurring the wrath of writer-director Tom "Servo" Harrison (Chris Hanel). Tom gets into a fight with his friends, and they walk out on him. After a monologue based on High Fidelity, with Star Wars in the place of rock music, Tom reflects back a few months to the genesis of the fanfilm project.

Tom, Greg, Jenny, and Zarth are seen hanging out at Excalibur Games, a hobby shop, playing the Star Wars pants game. Tom is revealed to be an employee at the store, working for store credit while he has his money saved up for film school. He claims the only downside to the job is the trekkies—specifically, two irate, Star Wars-hating ones named James (James Kropa) and Stewart (Michael Mulherin). The two enter the store, arguing over a discrepancy between the film Star Trek Generations and the Technical Manual. While waiting for Tom to get their new Star Trek cards, Stewart accidentally spills soda on a set of comics that Greg's boss ordered. Tom demands they pay for the damaged goods, and the Trekkies overpay him before leaving the store in a rush. Tom realizes that they can sell the undamaged books to Greg's boss for full price and pocket the money from the Trekkies. At Greg's suggestion, Tom combines the money with his remaining store credit and buys model lightsabers, which prompts the idea in his mind of making a Star Wars fanfilm.

Tom, Greg, Jenny, and Zarth sit around discussing ideas for a plot for their fanfilm, deciding against a story about a mischievous not-good-but-not-evil Jedi, a story about a post-Return of the Jedi Boba Fett (sitting on his butt watching Jerry Springer all day), a story about all the sith in the galaxy competing for the master-and-apprentice positions, and a rock musical. Tom doesn't want to do just another lightsaber duel film, which had become a cliche in Star Wars fan films by that point, but because no one can agree on any of the other ideas, they decide to do a duel after all, much to Tom's frustration. Tom approaches the reluctant Trekkies to do the visual effects, offering them ten percent of his store credit (which was all already spent on the lightsabers). Tom ends up spending all his money on preproduction for the film, and finds himself no longer able to afford film school. He has a nightmare about his film being terrible, with poorly-rotoscoped lightsabers and a soundtrack by Meco.

Back in the present, Zarth tells Tom he needs to "pull his head out". An irate Tom grabs a prop lightsaber, and the two enter a Matrix-inspired lightsaber duel fantasy sequence. When Zarth beats Tom, he asks him, "Do you think that's a real lightsaber you're holding?" Tom realizes he's been taking himself and the film too seriously, and has lost any sense of fun.

On their way back to Excalibur Games, Tom and Zarth are stopped by Greedo. Greedo and Tom begin to play out a homage to Greedo's scene in A New Hope, until Zarth interrupts and points out that the gag has already been done—in Crapisode One. Back at Excalibur, the gang shows Greedo the scene in question. He flips out, complaining that a lightsaber fight is so overdone, but one Greedo scene is done before and suddenly it's off-limits. Jenny explains that a lightsaber duel is a formula, and can be personalized, but they can't add anything to a Greedo scene, because "in the end, you always wind up dead," which Greg then proves by shooting Greedo in the head.

Later that night, the gang is eating pizza, and Tom apologizes to the others for his behavior. When it is revealed that Tom had dressed up as Darth Maul for the midnight showing of Star Wars: Episode I – The Phantom Menace, Tom recounts the story in a soliloquy reminiscent of Jaws. Tom then reveals how much he hated the movie, and how mad he was at George Lucas. Later, when he met his friends, he realized that no movie would have met his expectations. Now, he just wants to finish his fanfilm.

The gang finishes shooting the duel, and holds the premiere in the store. Everybody is excited watching the film. After everybody else goes home, Tom reflects on the point of making a Star Wars fanfilm—to have fun.

== Cast ==
- Chris Hanel as Thomas Harrison
- Abe Peterka as Greg
- Justin Whitlock as Zarth
- Rebecca Peterka as Jenny
- James Kropa as James / Greedo
- Michael Mulherin as Stewart
- Chad Canfield as Boba Fatt
