= Palpatine (disambiguation) =

Sheev Palpatine is a fictional character in the Star Wars franchise, the main antagonist of the Skywalker saga.

Palpatine may also refer to:

- Palpatine family is a fictional family in the Star Wars series, specifically the Skywalker saga
  - Supreme Leader Snoke (character), clone of Sheev
  - Rey Palpatine (character), scavenger, Jedi, honorary Skywalker and paternal granddaughter of Sheev
  - Palpatine saga, alternative name for the Skywalker saga, the nine central canon films that comprise the rise and fall of the Palpatines
  - "Palpatine", a Star Wars short story set before the Battle of Yavin, collected in the 2017 anthology From a Certain Point of View; see List of Star Wars books

== See also ==
- Eye of Palpatine, fictional warship in Star Wars
- "Peev Shalpatine", 2017 song by Jarrod Allonge, off the album Awkward & Depressed
- Silent Palpatine, nickname of Darth Jay from the 2003 animated Star Wars parody film Trooper Clerks
