= Mika Salmi =

Finnish-American entrepreneur

- Born: November 16, 1965 (age 60); Finland
- Citizenship: Finland; United States
- Occupation: Entrepreneur

Mika Salmi (born 16 November 1965) is a Finnish-American entrepreneur in technology and media.

== Biography ==
A dual citizen of Finland and the United States, Salmi was born in Finland, but he moved to the U.S. with his family when he was two years old. He is a pioneer in the creative and technology industries, founding AtomFilms – a forerunner in short-form, user-created content – in 1998, preceding YouTube by several years. He also ran the internet's most popular casual games web sites, Addicting Games, and Shockwave and built one of the first sports tracking apps. He has discovered Grammy, Oscar, and Emmy recognized artists, and has been profiled in dozens of trade, business and lifestyle publications and is a voting member of the Academy of Television Arts & Sciences.

At AtomFilms, he provided the first online video platform for Oscar winners Jason Reitman, Aardman Animation, and David Lynch. He was also the first to work with a major intellectual property rights owner to allow derivative works by the general public when AtomFilms created a partnership with George Lucas and LucasFilm for The Official Star Wars Fan Film Awards in November 2000.

Prior to founding Atom, Salmi worked in the music business at Sony Music and TVT Records, discovering and bringing Grammy-winning artists Nine Inch Nails and Presidents of the United States of America to the labels.

Salmi was CEO and founder of Atom Entertainment, AtomFilms, Shockwave, and Addicting Games – which together were ranked in the top 20 most popular entertainment websites and had over 28 million monthly active users. Sequoia Capital, led by Michael Moritz, was the lead investor in Atom Entertainment, which was purchased by Viacom for $200 million in 2006. From 2006 to 2009, Salmi promoted new media as president of global digital media for MTV Networks/Viacom. At a time of change for the media industry, Salmi is credited with helping MTV transition to digital.

For his role in the tech transformation of entertainment, the Wall Street Journal featured a front-page feature on Salmi; Vanity Fair named Salmi part of The Next Establishment, on a 2008 list that included Elon Musk and Tina Fey; and a 2000 Bloomberg Businessweek profile of Salmi stated he was almost 'the Man'. USA Today placed Salmi on a list of tech people to watch in 2001, in an article stating that Salmi's biggest challenge might be to get people to watch content on their computer screens. In addition to dozens of print publications, like those noted above and The New York Times, Salmi has appeared on multiple television news programs and morning talk shows, both in the US and overseas.

Salmi also created MadRaces in 2010, one of the first sports gaming apps, which he sold to Betaworks. Later, he became CEO of CreativeLive, a live video education company. Following that, he served as senior advisor to The Raine Group. Today Salmi is Managing Partner at the European venture capital firm Lakestar, known for investments in Airbnb, Blockchain, Glovo, Public, Revolut, and Spotify. He served on the board of international business school INSEAD, where he earned his MBA, and spearheaded the opening of its first location in the United States.
