= The Jedi Hunter =

- Directed by: John E. Hudgens
- Written by: John E. Hudgens; Lowell Cunningham; Denny Humbard
- Produced by: John E. Hudgens
- Starring: Brian Boling; Heather Harris; Jimmy Burns
- Distributed by: Z-Team Productions; Atomfilms
- Release date: August 30, 2002
- Running time: 8 minutes
- Country: United States
- Language: English

The Jedi Hunter is a fan film that made its debut on the internet on August 30, 2002, created by fans of the Star Wars franchise. It is a spoof of Star Wars and The Crocodile Hunter, with Boba Fett sliding into the Steve Irwin role, hunting Jedi along with his wife "Terri Fett".

While the film primarily spoofs the Star Wars universe in the format of a Crocodile Hunter special, there are several other notable targets, including swipes at Army of Darkness, "Crocodile" Dundee, Star Trek, Shaft, The Princess Bride, and Aliens. The film starts with a quick series of faux channel changes, opening with a cameo appearance by Crazy Watto and continuing with Star Wars versions of Cheers and The Six Million Dollar Man.

The film bears the odd credit "Special Thanks to Peter Mayhew for giving us the inspiration – that's right, blame the Wookiee!" According to Star Wars Insider, this credit is due to a missed dinner engagement with the Star Wars actor, which led the filmmakers to amuse themselves while waiting for him, eventually hitting upon the idea that became this film. They good-naturedly credit his not appearing at dinner with kick-starting the film.

The film has played at many film festivals, and proven popular with Star Wars fans, winning several awards, including Best Visual Effects at the 2003 Dahlonega International Film Festival, and the Audience Choice Award in the Lucasfilm-sponsored 2003 Official Star Wars Fan Film Awards. In August 2010, Time magazine listed it as one of the Top 10 Star Wars fanfilms.
