= Ryan Wieber =

American film director

Ryan Wieber (born May 24, 1984) is a visual effects compositor and former amateur filmmaker, best known for creating short Star Wars-related fan films featuring lightsaber duels, Ryan vs. Dorkman and its sequels, which he co-created with Michael Scott.

== Early life and career ==
Ryan Wieber was born May 24, 1984. He started playing with his grandmother's Panasonic VHS video camera at age 7. At age 12, he won a national filmmaking award for a sequel to Jurassic Park that he filmed called Paleolithic Park. He was eventually contacted by HBO to create short films for the HBO Family. At age 15, the Children's Discovery Museum asked him to make a short feature to be shown at the presentation of the Legacy for Children Award to Mr. Rogers. The four-minute film, which encourages parents to spend more time with their children, brought Rogers to tears.

Wieber graduated from Del Mar High School in San Jose, California. By 2003 he was attending a few classes at De Anza College and working part-time at Blockbuster Video.

== Fan film work ==
Wieber became enamored of the Star Wars franchise when he saw the visual effects in the film Star Wars: Episode I – The Phantom Menace, which he characterizes as "spectacular". He began mimicking the Star Wars visual effects using his Canon GL-1 camcorder and a PC that he built using two AMD microprocessors, each of which ran at 1.67 GHz in clock speed. His portfolio grew to include a number of different lightsaber battles, including a short clip of showing Wieber fighting himself. He also managed has his friends star in videos in which they would shoot "force lightning" from their hands.

=== Ryan vs. Dorkman ===
Ryan vs. Dorkman was first released to the internet on March 1, 2003. It was produced as an entry in a lightsaber choreography competition hosted by TheForce.net, a prominent Star Wars fan site noted for its fan film-making community. According to the official TFN entry for the film, the backstory involves Ryan and Michael, or "Ryan_W" and "DorkmanScott", as they are known on TheForce.net's forums, meeting after their friendly online rivalry over who is the better saber artist, and fighting to the death with actual lightsabers.

In early 2006, the short became a viral video after being posted on such websites as eBaumsworld, CollegeHumor, and the front page of YouTube as a "Featured Video." There was also a notable version uploaded to Google Video.

=== Ryan vs Dorkman 2 ===
Wieber and Scott announced in May 2006 that they would be producing a sequel. Ryan vs. Dorkman 2 (RvD2) was shot in Atlanta, Georgia in August 2006. They released a sneak peek of the film online in December 2006.

The film's score was recorded with a 60 piece orchestra at Capitol Studios in Hollywood. To accomplish this goal, film composers Gordy Haab and Kyle Newmaster donated their time and talents to the project. The film's creators solicited donations from fans in order to pay the musicians. M.B Gordy (lead percussionist from Battlestar Galactica) provided the percussion.

The film premiered in February 2007 at the Wilshire Fine Arts Theatre in Los Angeles before being released on the internet on March 1, 2007. Because of the viral popularity of RvD and RvD2, Ryan and Michael were invited to appear alongside many other internet celebrities in the music video "Pork and Beans" by Weezer. In August 2010, Time magazine listed it as one of the Top 10 Star Wars fanfilms.

=== Other films ===
Ryan vs Brandon is another lightsaber project in the vein of Ryan vs Dorkman; in this case, Wieber's opponent is Brandon Flyte, another fan film effects artist. Like RvD, RvB was created for one of the Lightsaber Choreography Competitions on TheForce.net/FanFilms.com forums, which it won. A sequel duel, Ryan vs. Brandon 2, was released in 2011.

Wieber and Michael "Dorkman" Scott served as visual effects supervisors for the Star Wars fanfilm The Formula, directed by Chris Hanel and Steve Phelan. This was Wieber and Scott's first visual effects collaboration and led to them becoming friends.

As of 2014, a duel called Ryan vs Nate was shooting but production was placed on-hold after Ryan's finger was broken.

== Professional career ==
According to a May 30, 2004 San Francisco Chronicle, Wieber had been contacted approximately a year prior by Clint Young, a senior effects artist at LucasArts in San Rafael, California, who had seen his light-saber fan films and was impressed. Upon calling Wieber's house and speaking to Wieber's mother, Young was surprised to learn that Wieber was a 19-year-old working at Blockbuster Video, commenting, "I just assumed that he was already working at an effects office." Young eventually spoke with Wieber, and by that September, Wieber was working at LucasArts as an associate effects artist. Young sees Wieber's transition from fan filmmaker to professional as a result of video cameras and PCs becoming more affordable to the masses. Alex Dunne, executive director of the International Game Developers Association, concurs, saying, "It's a natural progression in the industry to see kids younger and younger filling the ranks". Wieber stayed with LucasArts until October 2004. He went to work for Stargate Digital as a compositor in April 2005.

His contributions to primetime television effects work include the NBC TV drama Heroes.

On September 8, 2007, Wieber won an Emmy Award in the category "Outstanding Special Visual Effects For A Miniseries, Movie Or A Special" for his work as Lead Visual Effects Compositor on the TNT anthology TV series Nightmares and Dreamscapes: From the Stories of Stephen King.

On September 12, 2009, Wieber won his second Emmy Award in the category "Outstanding Special Visual Effects for a Series" for his work as Lead Visual Effects Compositor on the Heroes episodes "The Second Coming" and "The Butterfly Effect".

Due in part to recognition from Ryan vs. Dorkman, Wieber was offered a job at LucasArts, where he worked from September 2003 to October 2004 in the visual effects department. During his employment, he worked on the video games Star Wars: Episode III: Revenge of the Sith, Star Wars: Knights of the Old Republic II: The Sith Lords, and Star Wars: Republic Commando.

== Filmography ==
- Star Wars: Episode III – Revenge of the Sith (video game) (2005) (effects artist)
- Star Wars: Republic Commando (2005) (effects artist)
- Star Wars: Knights of the Old Republic II: The Sith Lords (2004) (visual effects artist: cinematic cutscenes)
- Heroes (NBC Television Series) 2006–2010 (effects artist)
- Star Wars: The Force Awakens 2015 (effects artist)
