= Pink Five Strikes Back =

- Directed by: Trey Stokes
- Written by: Trey Stokes
- Produced by: Christopher Reed
- Starring: Amy Earhart; Stephen Stanton
- Cinematography: John F.K. Parenteau; Keith Matz
- Music by: Doug Legacy
- Production company: The Truly Dangerous Company
- Distributed by: AtomFilms
- Release date: June 29, 2004
- Running time: 9 minutes
- Country: United States
- Language: English

Pink Five Strikes Back is a fan film that made its debut on the internet in 2004, created by fans of the Star Wars franchise. The sequel to the popular Pink Five, it is a comedy set in the Star Wars universe. Amy Earhart returns as Stacey (a.k.a. Pink Five), a fast-talking Valley Girl-type pilot.

In this installment, Stacey follows Luke Skywalker to Dagobah, and eventually ends up being trained by Yoda as well. As Pink Five did with Episode IV, the film presents familiar events, story points, and now characters from Episode V from a very different point of view.

The film proved popular with Star Wars fans, winning rave reviews and the Audience Choice Award in the 2004 Official Star Wars Fan Film Awards, sponsored by Lucasfilm and AtomFilms.

The next chapter of the Pink Five saga, Return of Pink Five was released in April 2006. The end of Pink Five Strikes Back promoted the final installment of the trilogy as The Revenge of Pink Five, though the third film was finally named Return of Pink Five which follows the Star Wars trilogy where the Episode VI's working title was Revenge of the Jedi but was ultimately named Return of the Jedi.
