= Darth Vader's Psychic Hotline =

2002 Star Wars fan film

- Directed by: John E. Hudgens
- Written by: John E. Hudgens; Lowell Cunningham
- Produced by: John E. Hudgens
- Starring: Robert E. Bean; Heather Harris
- Distributed by: Z-Team Productions; Atomfilms
- Release date: April 16, 2002
- Running time: 4 min.
- Language: English

Darth Vader's Psychic Hotline is a fan film that made its debut on the Internet on April 16, 2002, created by fans of the Star Wars franchise. It is a spoof of Star Wars and Miss Cleo-type psychic hotline infomercials, with Darth Vader taking calls and giving advice to various Star Wars characters.

While the film primarily spoofs the Star Wars universe in the format of an infomercial, there are several other notable targets, including subtle references to Star Trek, Babylon 5, Back to the Future, Battlestar Galactica, and Close Encounters of the Third Kind.

The film also uses a similar concept as the television show Frasier, where many of the guest callers are voiced by celebrities. This film features the voices of Kevin J. Anderson as Luke Skywalker, Claudia Christian as Princess Leia, Peter David as an Imperial officer, and Mike Jittlov as Han Solo.

The film has played at many film festivals, and proven popular with Star Wars fans, winning several awards, including Best Visual Effects and a Special Award for Merit at the 2003 Dahlonega International Film Festival. It was the second runner-up for the Audience Choice Award in the Lucasfilm-sponsored 2002 Official Star Wars Fan Film Awards.

== List of film references ==
- Babylon 5
- Back to the Future Part II
- Battlestar Galactica
- Close Encounters of the Third Kind
- Star Trek
- Star Wars
