= Star Wars: Revelations =

- Directed by: Shane Felux
- Written by: Dawn Cowings; Sarah Yaworsky
- Produced by: Dawn Cowings; Shane Felux
- Starring: Gina Hernandez; Karen Hammang; Holland Gedney; Frank Hernandez; Shane Felux
- Music by: Chris Bouchard
- Distributed by: Panic Struck Productions
- Release date: April 17, 2005
- Running time: 47 min.
- Country: United States
- Language: English
- Budget: $15,000 - $20,000+?

Star Wars: Revelations is a fan film released on April 17, 2005, created by fans of George Lucas's Star Wars saga. The film takes place between Revenge of the Sith and A New Hope, and explains why the Jedi Order was extinct in the original trilogy.

Compared to an average Star Wars feature film, Revelations runs shorter with a length of 47 minutes and 13 seconds (though many fan films run shorter). The film was made with a final budget between $15,000 and $20,000.

== Plot ==
=== Summary ===
The destruction of the Jedi Temple was devastating. Accusing the now-defunct Confederacy of Independent Systems of the attack, Emperor Palpatine declares martial law on Coruscant. As the Imperial presence spreads to most systems, Palpatine calls the scattered Jedi order ineffective. Their protests are denounced as treason, all Jedi are declared traitors, and are now fugitives of the Empire.

The film centers on Zhanna—one of the Emperor's Hands—and Taryn Anwar, a Seer who had helped Zhanna hunt down the Jedi without knowing that Zhanna had turned to the dark side. Taryn seeks to redeem herself; her visions lead her to a dangerous ancient Jedi artifact said to give the bearer great power.

=== Canonicity ===
Fan films by definition are not considered canonical. Revelations was written and produced before the premiere of Revenge of the Sith, and inevitably there were discrepancies between what the filmmakers hypothesized would transpire in Revenge of the Sith, and what was eventually depicted in Lucas's finished film. Many of these inconsistencies revolve around the chronology of the destruction of the Jedi order.

== Production ==
Production on the film began in 2003, with a cast and crew of nearly 200. While the production relied much on special effects, and most scenes—especially urban and space scenes—are composited, several scenes were shot on location, including the lengthy climactic sequence, filmed in Shenandoah Caverns over three nights. The special effects were done by a scattered group of artists around the world, working on different platforms and pieced together in post-production. The film was released on April 17, 2005—just over a month before Revenge of the Sith.

Revelations earned critical acclaim for the quality of its computer graphics and high production value for a fan film. It was produced by Panic Struck Productions and is available for download on TheForce.net, iFilm, and Panic Struck's website.

Though it was generally considered an excellent fan film, it could not be entered into The Official Star Wars Fan Film Awards because it was much longer than the contest's upper time limit, and because Lucasfilm only accepts parodies or documentaries as part of the competition. For legal reasons, they cannot allow serious fan fiction works into the contest. Despite this, director Shane Felux attended the fan film awards.

== Cast ==
- Gina Hernandez - Taryn Anwar
- Karen Hammang - Zhanna 'The Emperor's Hand'
- Holland Gedney - Raux Anwar
- Frank Hernandez - Declan
- Shane Felux - Cade / Boushh / Additional
- Joe Lancaster - Zhanna's Aide
- Kevin Zabawa - Darth Vader / Keishing Officer
- Jack Foley - Darth Vader (voice)
- Errol Spat Oktan - Emperor Palpatine/Annoying Drunk/Biker Scout/Tie Pilot #3
- Jonathan Thorpe - Emperor Palpatine (voice)
- Ayisha Cottontail - Go-go Dancer 3
- Nick Jamilla - Rogue 1/Sword Fight Choreographer

== Reception ==
=== Praise and criticism ===
Shortly after the film's premiere in April 2005, the director, Shane Felux, appeared on many news and talk shows promoting the film, notably CNN's Anderson Cooper 360° and MSNBC's Connected: Coast to Coast with Ron Reagan and Monica Crowley. The film was made available free for downloading online starting April 19, 2005, and in fact the volume was so heavy that Star Wars fan site TheForce.Net was forced to temporarily discontinue offering it after two days because it overloaded their bandwidth. Independent online film site iFilm also made Revelations available for download starting April 23, 2005. Within two weeks of the film being made available online, it was downloaded nearly one million times.

For the most part, the media praised the film, especially for its special effects and story. Others noted that the film was quite ambitious for a production of its kind. Some even compared the production and ambition of the film to that of the original Star Wars film, A New Hope.

George Lucas, though he admits he has yet to see Revelations, has said how much he appreciates the work and ideas of his fans on fan films in general, and enjoys watching them. He encourages productions such as these, which is something relatively rare for an owner and creator of such a series to do.

=== Awards ===
- 2005 Balticon Film Festival: Best Film
- 2005 Star Walking Film Festival (Australia): Best Live Action, Production Design, Editing, Visual Effects, Best Actress (Gina Hernandez)
- 2005 MassBay Film Festival: Best Fan Film

== Soundtrack ==
Chris Bouchard composed an original soundtrack for Revelations, which utilizes certain Star Wars themes.

== Home media ==
A downloadable DVD image of Revelations was released not long after its debut on the internet. Originally, the film was released via QuickTime, Windows Media Player, and several other file formats. For the DVD release, the DVD image was distributed from the official site, free of charge, just as the film was. Users can download the entire movie, plus a second disc of bonus features. The download is offered through the BitTorrent file sharing program, due to the large size of the files. Along with the disc files, users can download case art for their DVD case. A DIVX 6 version is also available to provide the same features as the DVD, such as chapter selections, subtitles, director's commentary and such, without the large file size.

== See also ==
- The Official Star Wars Fan Film Awards
