= Lowell Cunningham =

American comic book writer

- Born: 1958 or 1959 (age 67–68)
- Education: University of Tennessee (PhB)
- Occupations: Writer, comic book author
- Writing career
- Genres: Science fiction, action
- Notable work: The Men in Black

Lowell Cunningham (born c. 1958/1959) is an American comic book author. He is best known for creating the comic book The Men in Black, which later became the basis for a media franchise.

== Early life ==
Lowell Cunningham was raised in Franklin, Tennessee, the son of farmers Ralph and Ruby Cunningham, the latter of whom was also an office worker for the state government. A fan of science-fiction and espionage fiction spy-fiction TV shows in his youth, he went on to a bachelor's degree in philosophy from The University of Tennessee in 1985.

== Career ==
Following college, Cunningham worked for nearly three years in the circulation department of the Knox County Library in Knoxville, Tennessee. After his 1990 comic-book series The Men in Black from Aircel Comics finished its run, Cunningham worked as a factory security guard. When his comic became the basis for the 1997 film Men in Black, Cunningham earned what he said in an interview that year was an initial "six-figure sum. In the low six figures. I've been living off it for five years."

This launched a media franchise that has included the sequels Men in Black II (2002) and Men in Black 3 (2012), a 2019 spin-off Men in Black: International, and an animated television program, Men in Black: The Series, which ran from October 1997 to June 2001. Cunningham went on to co-write four Star Wars parody short films with director John E. Hudgens, released from 2000 to 2005, and in 2012 returned to comics with About Comics' Jack Ooze, starring a district attorney turned semi-liquid superhero.

== Personal life ==
As of 2008, Cunningham lived in West Knoxville, Tennessee.

== Bibliography ==
=== Comics ===
Comics work includes:

- The Men in Black (with Sandy Carruthers, three-issue miniseries, Aircel Comics, January–March 1990, trade paperback, June 1990, ISBN 0944735606)
- Alien Nation: The Skin Trade (with Leonard Kirk, four-issue miniseries, Malibu Comics, March–June 1991)
- The Men in Black Book II (with Sandy Carruthers & Scott Dutton, three-issue miniseries, Aircel Comics, May–July 1991)
- Alien Nation: The Public Enemy (with Sandy Carruthers, three-issue miniseries, Malibu Comics, Dec. 1991 - March 1992)
- Men In Black: Far Cry (with Dietrich Smith, one-shot, Marvel Comics, Aug. 1997)
- Men in Black: Movie Adaptation (with Rod Whigham, one-shot, Marvel Comics, Oct. 1997)
- Men In Black: Retribution (with Rod Whigham, one-shot, Marvel Comics, Dec. 1997)
- Jack Ooze (About Comics, 2012)

=== Short films ===
Star Wars parodies with John Hudgens include:

- Crazy Watto (2000)
- Darth Vader's Psychic Hotline (April 2002)
- The Jedi Hunter (August 2002)
- Sith Apprentice (March 2005)
