= Allegiance (novel) =

2007 novel by Timothy Zahn

- Author: Timothy Zahn
- Language: English
- Series: Star Wars
- Genre: Military science fiction
- Publisher: Del Rey
- Publication date: January 30, 2007
- Publication place: United States
- Media type: Hardcover
- Preceded by: Star Wars: A New Hope
- Followed by: Choices of One

Allegiance is a Star Wars novel released in January 2007 by Del Rey. The book was written by Timothy Zahn, and was followed in 2011 with Choices of One.

== Story ==
The story is set just after Star Wars: Episode IV – A New Hope. The book's subject is, according to Zahn, "...three different people and groups with allegiance issues."

== Synopsis ==
The story is told in three parallel threads which intertwine in the latter part of the book.

Five members of the Imperial Stormtroopers attached to the Imperial Star Destroyer Reprisal begin to have doubts about their work after being made to participate in a massacre of innocents on the planet Teardrop. After this massacre, an Imperial Security Bureau (ISB) officer, Major Dreflin, pushes one of these stormtroopers, Daric LaRone, too far in a power trip. LaRone defends himself, and the ISB officer is killed by his own weapon in the scuffle. The five stormtroopers realize official channels will only blame them for the death, and escape the Reprisal aboard a stolen ISB ship. While on the run, their sense of honor and duty lead them to intervene in seemingly unrelated incidents where they rescue local populace. These incidents are later revealed to be linked, and the group begins to actively pursue the perpetrators, a pirate group named the Bloodscars operating in the Shelsha Sector.

Meanwhile, Leia Organa is dispatched to the Shelsha Sector to mediate a conflict between three local representatives of the Rebellion, and Luke Skywalker, Han Solo, and Chewbacca are sent along as her escorts. They separate to pursue different leads: the men investigate pirate attacks on the Rebel supply line, and Leia begins a negotiation that could lead to the governor of Shelsha sector to declaring independence and publicly joining the Rebellion.

Mara Jade simultaneously engages in an investigation of corrupt Imperial Moffs. Tracking down clues from a series of stolen artworks, she is led to the pirates operating out of Shelsha Sector.

The three plotlines intertwine when Leia Organa is recognized by Chief Administrator Vilim Disra, a politician who has been playing the Rebels, pirates, and governor off each other in order to publicly denounce all of them and rise in the political ranks. Disra orders Shelsha's capitol planet of Shelkonwa shut down, and begins a manhunt for Leia.

Mara Jade, still investigating pirates, is mistakenly believed by the captain of the Reprisal to be investigating the stormtrooper deserters. He attempts to kill her to hide this indiscretion, an action she mistakenly attributes to the governor of Shelsha Sector, causing her to head to Shelkonwa. There, she bumps into the stormtrooper deserters, whose own investigation of the pirates led them to Han, Luke, and Chewie, whom they have agreed to help in smuggling Leia off the planet.

Mara orders the stormtroopers to help her in apprehending the governor, which they nervously agree to. Ultimately, Mara realizes that the stormtroopers are deserters, but deserters with noble intent (though she does not discover their key role in rescuing Leia from the manhunt), and decides not to turn them in.

== Continuity ==
- The book includes a cameo appearance of a character based on Stacey, the heroine of the Pink Five series of fanfilms, marking the first time a fan-created Star Wars character has ever crossed into the Expanded Universe.
- The first hardcover printing has the time period mislabeled as taking place during the Rise of the Empire/Prequel Trilogy period instead of the correct time period, Rebellion Era/Classic Trilogy.
- It was indicated in the original Thrawn trilogy novels that the Rebels (Luke Skywalker, Han Solo, Chewbacca, and Leia Organa) met Mara Jade for the first time during the events of that same trilogy. As such, despite being in the same place at the same time on more than one occasion, the Rebels and Mara Jade do not actually see each other.

== Reception ==
David Maddox on SF Site wrote that "although the pirates and corrupt royalty of the story do seem rather flat, fans will get a smile seeing the classic characters as when they were first introduced 30 years ago". A review on Publishers Weekly mentioned that "this episode will please fans wondering about events between the first and second movies in the original Star Wars trilogy". School Library Journal said the book is "[t]ightly plotted and fast paced".

== Sequel ==
Choices of One
- Author: Timothy Zahn
- Cover artist: John Van Fleet
- Publisher: Del Rey
- Publication date: July 19, 2011
- Media type: Hardcover
- Pages: 384
- ISBN: 978-0-345-51125-6
- Preceded by: Allegiance

Choices of One is a Star Wars novel written by Zahn, released by Del Rey on July 19, 2011. The sequel to Zahn's 2007 novel Allegiance, it is set between the events of the films Star Wars: A New Hope and The Empire Strikes Back and features Luke Skywalker, Princess Leia, Han Solo, Mara Jade, and the villain Nuso Esva.
