= Trooper Clerks =

2003 animated film

Trooper Clerks is an American animated parody film produced by Studio Creations that depicts Dante Hicks and Randall Graves, the titular convenience store clerks from writer/director Kevin Smith's Clerks films, as Stormtroopers in the Star Wars media franchise, in a satire of both properties.

The film was nominated for the 2003 Official Star Wars Fan Film Awards, and won the Animation category.

== Plot ==
According to the official web site, "Trooper Clerks is a parody mixing the characters from Kevin Smith's Clerks universe with the settings and characters in George Lucas's Star Wars universe."

== Cartoons ==
- Trooper Clerks: The Live-Action Trailer - This 1998 shot-for-shot recreation of the 1994 Clerks movie trailer was the first Trooper Clerks project produced by Studio Creations. Clerks director Kevin Smith, wrote the creators an e-mail after watching the trailer online, encouraging them to do more with the parody if they chose.
- Trooper Clerks: The Animated One-Shot - Part I - Being told that their jobs are in peril due to cutbacks, Stormtroopers Dante and Randal embark on a quest to steal the Death Star plans by hiring the station's Sith duo in training, Darth Jay and Darth Bob. Darth Jay is portrayed as Darth Maul from Episode I, with the black stripes on his face in the shape of a cannabis leaf. Darth Bob is based on Darth Sidious, and is referred to as "Silent Palpatine".
- Trooper Clerks: The Animated One-Shot - Part II - Dante and Randal continue their quest for gainful employment while Darth Jay and Darth Bob pull every trick in the book trying to snatch the plans from its ultra-secure location.
