= Forced Alliance =

1997 action simulation video game

- Developer: Orbital Studios
- Publisher: Ripcord Games
- Platform: Windows
- Release: September 24, 1997
- Genres: Action, Simulation
- Mode: Single-player

Forced Alliance: The Glarious Mandate is an action simulation video game, developed by American studio Orbital Studios and published by Ripcord Games.

== Gameplay ==
Forced Alliance is an action simulation video game.

== Development ==
Forced Alliance was developed by Orbital Studios, a company founded in 1994.

Orbital Studios originally had a working project codenamed Alien Alliance around 1995, that looked similar in visual and interface designs to Forced Alliance. It was also planned to come on the PlayStation. That former game was likely reworked and released as the latter game, exclusively for the PC.

== Reception ==
Reception

Review scores
Publication	Score
Computer Gaming World	3.5/5
GameRevolution	1.5/5
GameSpot	7.2/10
Gamezilla	53/100

Forced Alliance received mixed reception from video game critics.
