= Ryan vs. Dorkman =

Ryan vs. Dorkman, often abbreviated by fans as RvD, is a series of Star Wars fan films, created by Ryan Wieber and Michael "Dorkman" Scott, and first released to the internet on March 1, 2003.

== Ryan vs. Dorkman ==
Ryan vs. Dorkman
- Directed by: Michael Scott; Ryan Wieber
- Written by: Michael Scott; Ryan Wieber
- Starring: Michael Scott; Ryan Wieber
- Cinematography: Colin Waledisch
- Edited by: Michael Scott; Ryan Wieber
- Production companies: Blinding Light Productions; Ryan W Films
- Distributed by: TheForce.Net
- Release date: March 1, 2003
- Running time: 5 minutes
- Country: United States

Ryan vs. Dorkman was produced as an entry in a lightsaber choreography competition hosted by TheForce.net, a prominent Star Wars fan site noted for its fan film-making community. According to the official TFN entry for the film, the backstory involves Ryan and Michael, or "Ryan_W" and "DorkmanScott" as they are known on TheForce.net's forums, meeting after their friendly online rivalry over who is the better saber artist escalates too far. The fight to the death will determine once and for all who is the most skilled with a saber.

In mid-2006, the short became a viral video after being posted on such websites as eBaumsworld, CollegeHumor, and the front page of YouTube as a "Featured Video." The YouTube video, which passed one million views by January 30 had over five million views as of March 2010. There were also versions uploaded to Google Video and other sites.

In early 2008 Wieber and Scott re-mastered "RvD" and made it available for download on the official site. The re-mastering involved removing the "greenish-yellow wash," re-doing some effects, fixing rotoscoping errors, reversing the effects from the de-interlacing (which gave diagonal lines a "jagged" look), re-framing certain cuts and upgrading the audio track from a loud mono track to a softer stereo track. A more detailed explanation of the remastering process was also posted on the site.

Both Ryan and 'Dorkman' were featured in the music video for Weezer's 2008 song "Pork and Beans" which included many other internet video stars.

== Ryan vs. Dorkman 2 ==
Ryan vs. Dorkman 2
- Directed by: Michael Scott; Ryan Wieber
- Written by: Michael Scott; Ryan Wieber
- Starring: Michael Scott; Ryan Wieber
- Cinematography: Travis Boles
- Edited by: Michael Scott; Ryan Wieber
- Music by: Gordy Haab; Kyle Newmaster
- Production company: Blinding Light Productions
- Release dates: February 24, 2007 (Wilshire Fine Arts Theatre); March 1, 2007 (United States)
- Running time: 9 minutes
- Country: United States

Wieber and Scott announced in May 2006 that they would be producing a sequel. Ryan vs. Dorkman 2 (RvD2) was shot in Atlanta, Georgia in August 2006, and featured several technical improvements over the original RvD, such as the fact that it was shot in 24p high-definition, as opposed to the original's 30p standard definition. The lightsaber blades also interact with the environment in the form of sparks, burns and other effects which were not present in the original. These were made in collaboration with Bob Forward.

The film's score was recorded with a 57 piece orchestra at Capitol Studios in Hollywood. To accomplish this goal, film composers Gordy Haab and Kyle Newmaster donated their time and talents to the project. The film's creators solicited donations from fans in order to pay the musicians. M.B Gordy (lead percussionist from Battlestar Galactica) provided the percussion.

The film premiered February 24, 2007 at the Wilshire Fine Arts Theatre in Los Angeles, with a screening at the New York Comic Con the following day. The film was released on the internet on March 1, 2007, with a soundtrack DC release later that summer. Within one year, it acquired over 2 million YouTube views and underwent a re-release in full HD.

The film was entered into the 2008 Star Wars Fan Movie Challenge, where it won Best Visual Effects.

In August 2010, Time magazine listed it as one of the Top 10 Star Wars fanfilms.

== Ryan vs. Dorkman 3 ==
In a behind-the-scenes video from Wieber and Scott, they commented in a May 2007 video on possible plans to do a Ryan vs. Dorkman 3 sometime in the future. No official timetable was set, but Wieber and Scott stated that they would produce it when they conceived more ideas on how to structure and film that installment, as they did not wish to simply create a rehash of RvD2 that exhibited no substantial advancements in special effects or filmmaking.
