= Dark Resurrection =

- Directed by: Angelo Licata
- Produced by: Angelo Licata
- Starring: Giuseppe Licata; Marcella Braga; Maurizio Zuppa
- Cinematography: Angelo Licata
- Edited by: Federico Lagna
- Music by: Aldo De Scalzi; Pivio
- Production companies: Guerre Stellari Net; RCL Sound FX; Lords of Illusion
- Distributed by: Machiavelli Music Publishing
- Release date: 7 June 2007
- Running time: 61 minutes
- Country: Italy
- Language: Italian
- Budget: €7,000

Dark Resurrection is a 2007 Italian Star Wars fan film written and directed by Angelo Licata and produced by Davide Bigazzi and Licata. It was followed by a second episode, titled Dark Resurrection vol. 0 in 2011, and Dark Resurrection vol. 2, subtitled Keepers of the Force, in 2019.

== Plot ==
The story begins a few centuries after Return of the Jedi. Jedi Master Organa has foreseen the destruction of the Jedi, and send young Hope and her master, Zui Mar-Lee, to attempt to reach Eron first, before the dark Lord Sorran.

In the prequel vol. 0, Lord Sorran, a dark Jedi, searches for Eron, a mythical source of great power and finds the spaceship Resurrection, belonging to the Second Guardian of Eron. His crew gets killed on the ship, but Lord Sorran escapes with the secret of immortality.

== Cast ==
- Marcella Braga as Hope
- Riccardo Leto as Leto
- Giuseppe Licata as Lord Sorran
- Sergio Múñiz as Muniza
- Grazia Ogulin as Nemer
- Fabrizio Rizzolo as Zorol
- Sara Ronco as His
- Elisa Werneck as Organa
- Giorgia Würth as Meres
- Maurizio Zuppa as Zui Mar Lee

== Production ==
Movie scenes were shot in Italian Riviera in Liguria and further enhanced by special effects.

== Reception ==
The film was acclaimed by critics. In a short time it had an unexpected success, with over 15,000 downloads per day, and was broadcast on television.

== Episodes ==
The first episode was released on 2007, June 7. Its production cost about €7,000.

A second episode, called Dark Resurrection Vol. 0, was released on September 8, 2011 and is currently available on YouTube.

A third episode was called Dark Resurrection Vol. 2. On the heels of Dark Resurrection Vol. 0 and Vol. 1, Dark Resurrection Vol. 2 was launched on Fansflock.com, a new USA fanfunding platform. They were seeking help to fanfund the new epic finale. Angelo Licata, Director, had lined up some unique rewards for the film's contributors, from the lightsaber props used in the movie to meeting the cast, even to producer credits.
