= Rebel Legion =

Media franchise fan-based organization

The Rebel Legion
- Founded: December 2000
- Founder: Tony Troxell and Richard Fairbrother
- Region served: Worldwide
- Members: 5200 (as of November 2019)
- Key people: Anthony Wilson, Legion Commanding Officer; Amber Martin Sotelo, Legion Executive Officer
- Website: http://www.rebellegion.com/

The Rebel Legion is an international fan-based volunteer organization dedicated to the construction and wearing of screen-accurate replicas of the Rebel Alliance, the Galactic Republic, the New Republic, the Resistance, the Jedi Order, and other heroes from the Star Wars universe. Founded in 2000, the group was formed in response to the decision of sister organization the 501st Legion to remain dedicated to Galactic Empire costumes. The Rebel Legion makes appearances at private and public events, including charitable events and official Star Wars promotional events. The organization does not charge a fee for appearances, instead encouraging a donation to a charity.

It is divided into "bases" located throughout the world, and as of November 2019, the Rebel Legion membership is approximately 8,000 members.

== History ==
In early 2000, the 501st Legion Star Wars costuming group chose to remain "Imperials only". This prompted 501st members Tony Troxell, Richard Fairbrother, Ed O'Connell, Ken Ograyensek, and Doug Fesko to create a separate "Rebels only" costuming group, officially announced to the 501st Legion forums in December 2000. Though not affiliated with Lucasfilm, the Rebel Legion is officially sanctioned by Lucasfilm.

== Structure ==
The Rebel Legion is divided into detachments determined by the type of character costumes represent. The organization is also divided into bases or outposts determined by geographical region; bases can be further divided into variably named detachment units. The leadership consists of a Commanding Officer and 5 Council members. Additional leadership roles are assigned as needed per the LCO (LPRO, LMO, etc.)

== Charitable work ==
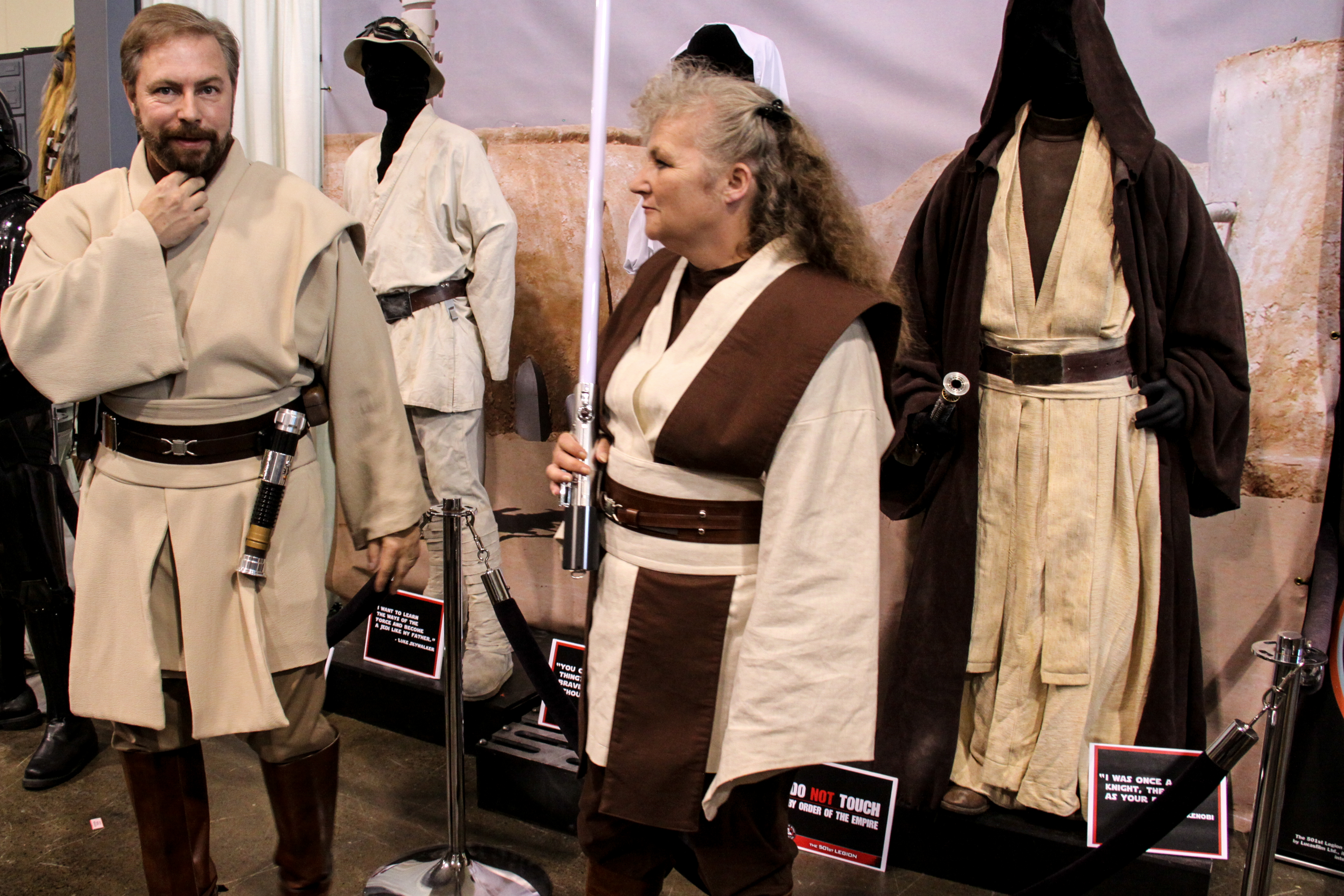
Rebel Legion at Fan Expo Canada 2013

Giving back to the community is one of the Rebel Legion's highest priorities. Members regularly participate in events to raise awareness of charitable causes, from walk-a-thons to blood drives. Because of this, the Rebel Legion proudly refers to themselves as "the good guys." For public and private gatherings, the Legion never charges a fee for an appearance, but they do welcome donations made to an event host's favorite charity in the name of the Legion or the local Legion unit. If an event host does not have a charity of choice, Legion members usually provide a suggestion, sometimes tied to a fundraising effort that is already underway. In cases where the event host is itself a charitable organization, a donation is usually not accepted by the Rebel Legion as they volunteer their time for that charitable organization.

Some of the events where the member of the Rebel Legion were guests, supporters, artists or exhibitors to support charity projects:

- Star Wars Celebration /
- Salt Lake Comic-Con
- Philadelphia Comic-Con
- Dallas Comic-Con
- Pensacon
- Oz Comic-Con
- Motor City Comic-Con
- Galactic Con
- Wizardworld
- San Diego Comic-Con
- Dutch Comic-Con
- Indy Pop-Con
- Cherry City Comic-Con
- Twin Tiers Comic-Con
- MCM - Comic-Con
