= Troops (film) =

- Directed by: Kevin Rubio
- Written by: Kevin Rubio
- Story by: Steven Melching; David Hargrove; David McDermott
- Based on: Star Wars by George Lucas; Cops by John Langley and Malcolm Barbour
- Produced by: Kevin Rubio; Shant Jordan; Patrick Pérez
- Starring: Cameron Clarke; Jess Harnell; Bill Farmer; Eric Hilleary; Caleb Skinner
- Cinematography: Cricket Peters
- Edited by: David Foster
- Distributed by: TheForce.Net
- Release date: July 18, 1997
- Running time: 10 minutes
- Language: English

Troops is a 1997 short mockumentary film directed by Kevin Rubio that debuted at San Diego Comic-Con on July 18, 1997 and was subsequently distributed via the internet. The film is a parody of COPS, set in the Star Wars universe. In the film, Imperial stormtroopers from the infamous Black Sheep Squadron patrolling the Dune Sea on the planet Tatooine run into familiar characters while being filmed for the hit Imperial TV show Troops. In a Reddit AMA in January 2018, Rubio stated that Troops is acknowledged by George Lucas as a canonical installment in the Star Wars franchise.

The film jump-started the modern fan film movement, as it was one of the first short films to bring fan films into the digital age, taking advantage of internet distribution and affordable production and special effects equipment, as well as fans with movie-quality costumes. Rubio shot the film on location on the El Mirage Dry Lake.

Rubio finished the film while working at the Fox Kids Network, and was able to use well-known voice talent in his cast, including Jess Harnell, Cam Clarke, and announcer Bill Farmer.

== Plot ==
The film's opening monologue spoofs the opening of COPS: "TROOPS is filmed on location with the men of the Imperial Forces. All suspects are GUILTY, period! Otherwise, they wouldn't be suspects, would they?" Adding to the comic tone are the accents from the stormtroopers which is very reminiscent to the accents in the film Fargo.

TROOPS contains an alternate tongue-in-cheek take on the deaths of Luke Skywalker's Uncle Owen and Aunt Beru, presenting their fate as the result of a domestic dispute rather than execution at the hands of Imperial forces. The spotlighted members of Black Sheep Squadron attempt to mediate the dispute before Beru makes a disastrous move with a thermal detonator.

The film ends with an incoming message about a possible disturbance in Mos Eisley Cantina.

== Cast ==
- Eric Hilleary as Captain Jyanix Bauch, Captain Reh Taeh and Boba Fett
  - Cam Clarke as the voice of Captain Jyanix Bauch
  - Paul Pistore as the voice of Captain Reh Taeh
- David Max as Officer Daemon Mott
  - Jess Harnell as the voice of Officer Daemon Mott
- Kenar Yegyayan as Officer Ayches Ram and Trooper HK-883
  - Drew Massey as the voice of Officer Ayches Ram
  - Dave Fouquette as the voice of Trooper HK-883
- Caleb Skinner as Trooper HK-888
  - Kevin Rubio as the voice of Trooper HK-888
- David Myers and Matthew Myers as the Jawas
  - Steven Melching and Paul Pistore as the voice of the Jawas
- Neil Elliott as Owen Lars
- Susan Hindshaw as Beru Lars
- Paul Pistore and Kevin Rubio as Radio Dispatchers
- Bill Farmer as the Announcer

== Reception ==
The film has proven popular with Star Wars fans, and was awarded the inaugural Pioneer Award in the Lucasfilm-sponsored 2002 Official Star Wars Fan Film Awards.

Fan Films Quarterly listed Troops as one of the 10 most pivotal moments in fan film history in its Summer 2006 issue. In August 2010, Time magazine listed it as one of the Top 10 Star Wars fanfilms.

In 2005, a new film called I.M.P.S. was released, made by several of the actors from TROOPS. Originally planned as a sequel, the film was first billed as TROOPS 2, but was renamed after fans learned that not only was Rubio not involved with the project, but that over the course of writing and production, the film had evolved into something entirely different (with a serious tone as opposed to the comedic one in TROOPS).

== Availability ==
Troops was released on the free DVD given away with the inaugural edition of Total Movie magazine, complete with commentary track by Rubio. It was also included as a bonus feature on the 20th anniversary DVD of the TV series COPS.
