= TIE Fighter (film) =

2015 American fan film

- Film poster
- Directed by: Paul Johnson
- Written by: Paul Johnson
- Based on: Star Wars: TIE Fighter by Lucasarts
- Produced by: Paul Johnson
- Edited by: Paul Johnson
- Music by: Zakir Rahman
- Release date: 24 March 2015 (YouTube)
- Running time: 7 minutes

TIE Fighter is a 2015 short Star Wars animated fan film set during the original trilogy. It was created by Paul Johnson (known as "OtaKing77077" on YouTube) over the course of four years. It depicts a space battle between the Empire and the Rebel Alliance from the Imperial TIE pilots' point of view. Johnson stated that the film is an homage to not only the anime style of the 1980s, but also the 1994 Star Wars: TIE Fighter video game, which the film uses sound effects from and borrows the logo design of. A remastered version, using sound effects and theme music from Star Wars Battlefront and Rogue One, was released in 2017 from "J Ramseier", with Johnson's approval.

== Reception ==
Nolan Feeney of Time.com described the film as, "...incredibly detailed..." Christopher Curley of The A.V. Club praised the detail of and animation itself and the soundtrack, and called it "a great could've been" for adult-oriented Star Wars cartoons. Rich McCormick of The Verge described the film as, "...action-packed, beautifully drawn, smoothly animated, and — most importantly — impressively accurate to Star Wars' fiction." Luke Plunkett of Kotaku described the film as, "...one of the most laborious letters of love to a video game I've ever seen." Ryan Lambie of Den of Geek praised Johnson's "hard work", and said, "...if a full series of this suddenly appeared somewhere, we'd happily watch it." Peter Sciretta of SlashFilm described the film as, "amazing," "incredible," and "beautiful."

== See also ==
- Alien: Monday, a 2024 Alien fan film also by OtaKing Animation
