= John E. Hudgens =

American actor

- Hudgens at Dragon Con in 2026
- Born: April 6, 1967 (age 59); Memphis, Tennessee, United States
- Occupations: Film director, producer

John E. Hudgens (born April 6, 1967) is an American independent director, producer, and editor noted for his short Star Wars fan films and for many Babylon 5 promotional videos.

On his own, Hudgens began editing Babylon 5 videos cut to popular music beginning in 1994. Babylon 5 creator and writer J. Michael Straczynski saw these early efforts and hired Hudgens to officially produce B5 promotional music videos for science fiction fan conventions and other events. Eight official videos were produced, plus more unofficial videos shown at conventions and distributed on the Internet.

Hudgens had also dabbled in fan films, producing The Empire Strikes Quack in the late 1980s. Beginning in 2000, Hudgens made the first of a series of noted Star Wars fan films, Crazy Watto, a two-minute parody of Star Wars and used car commercials. The film proved very popular and would go on to be an official selection at Lucasfilm's Official Star Wars Fan Film Awards and screen at the Cannes Film Festival. His second film, Darth Vader's Psychic Hotline, is a fast-paced four-minute parody of many science fiction shows and films, and features Kevin J. Anderson, Claudia Christian and Peter David among others. This effort was the second runner-up for the Audience Choice Award at the 2002 Official Star Wars Fan Film Awards, an award he would win the next year for The Jedi Hunter, a parody of Star Wars and The Crocodile Hunter. He would win the Audience Choice Award once more in 2005 for Sith Apprentice, his longest fan film to date, at twelve minutes. All of Hudgens fan films were produced, directed, shot, and edited by him, were made in collaboration with The Men in Black creator Lowell Cunningham, and were produced and released by Hudgens' Z-Team Productions company.

Hudgens went on to create American Scary, a feature-length documentary about television horror hosts. The film premiered in October 2006 at the Hollywood Film Festival, and was released on DVD in February 2009.

Hudgens' most recent effort was Backyard Blockbusters, a 2012 documentary about the fan film genre and the people behind it.
