= 501st Legion =

Fan club

The 501st Legion
- Founded: August 1997
- Founder: Albin Johnson and Tom Crews
- Type: 501(c)(7) non-profit organization
- Region served: Worldwide
- Members: 15,600+
- Key people: Justin Sonfield, Legion Commanding Officer
- Website: http://www.501st.com/

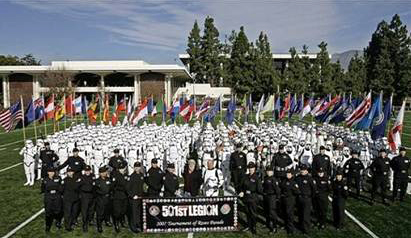
Members of the 501st Legion with George Lucas at the 2007 Tournament of Roses Parade

The 501st Legion is an international fan-based organization dedicated to the construction and wearing of screen-accurate replicas of Imperial stormtrooper armor, Sith Lords, clone troopers, bounty hunters, and other villains from the Star Wars universe. The 501st Legion, called by its nickname Vader's Fist, is made up entirely of volunteers.

Formed in South Carolina by residents Albin Johnson and Tom Crews in August 1997, the Legion now has over 14,000 active members worldwide, with over 26,000 approved costumes. The Legion is active on 6 continents, with local units known as "Garrisons" and "Outposts" in over 60 countries. Legion members make appearances at casual, promotional, and charitable events, often at the request of Lucasfilm's Fan Events department. Although not officially affiliated with the Walt Disney Company or Lucasfilm LLC., the 501st Legion is Lucasfilm's preferred Imperial costuming organization, and its members were featured as extras in the official series The Mandalorian.

== Origins ==
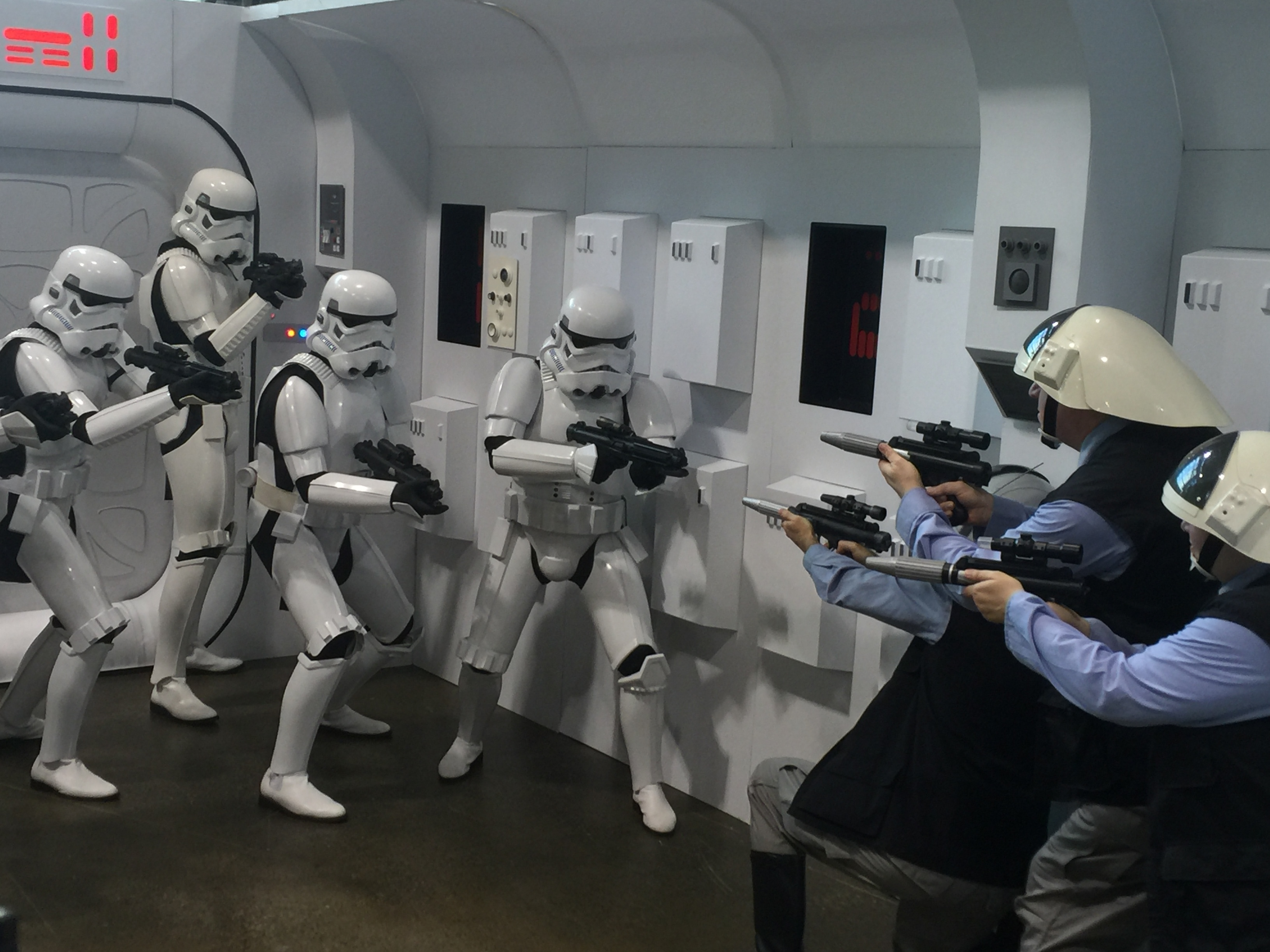
501st at the Fan Expo Canada 2016 in Toronto

In 1997, Albin Johnson set up a GeoCities website called "Detention Block 2551" as a place to post photos of himself and his friend Tom Crews in their homemade Stormtrooper costumes. Arnie DeHerrera started "Stormtrooperland" at the same time in 1997 and started email conversation with Johnson and Crews. Shortly after that, Scott McArthur of Canada became involved and developed the original logo with the words, "The Fighting 501st!" as its catch phrase with a stormtrooper helmet with red eyes in front of a purple Imperial logo. This evolved quickly into the current red, black, and white logo with the phrase, "Vader's Fist" to express the force with which the 501st led. Within weeks of launching the sites, Albin was fielding email requests from people across the country and around the world looking to be featured on his website in their own homemade Stormtrooper armor. The Legion ranks swelled, and regional subdivisions called Garrisons, Squads, and Outposts were created to facilitate the organization of events and appearances on a local level.

While the Legion was initially based only on the white-armored stormtroopers stationed aboard the Death Star, as the group expanded, it grew to encompass every other canon trooper variation, and other villains from the Star Wars saga, such as Sith Lords and bounty hunters. Custom creations are generally not eligible for membership, and all applicants are reviewed by their local units and Legion Membership Officers prior to approval into the member database.

Early events attended (or "trooped") by the Legion were mostly science-fiction and comic book conventions or related to the release of the Star Wars movies in theaters and on video. But members were looking for more frequent reasons to meet up with their new-found Legion friends and show off their costumes together. The Legion expanded into a charitable organization.

A decade after Johnson and Crews founded the Legion, on January 1, 2007, two hundred members of the Legion marched in the annual Tournament of Roses Parade in Pasadena, California, with George Lucas himself as the grand marshal. At this watershed moment for the club, Lucas and Johnson discussed the future of the rapidly growing Legion, and an unofficial partnership was born. Lucasfilm would grant the Legion a limited use of their copyrighted characters, as long as members of the 501st promised never to use their costumes for personal profit and that they represent the franchise in a positive and respectful manner.

=== The 501st Legion name ===
Johnson and Tom chose the club's name in 1997 to represent a fictional unit of Imperial stormtroopers. He wanted to ground the group in a "realistic" world and to pay homage to the fighting units of true military heroes, like his World War II airman father.

In 2004, author Timothy Zahn, with Lucasfilm's approval, honored the costuming group by incorporating the 501st Legion Elite Stormtrooper Unit into his Star Wars novel Survivor's Quest. Several other authors have since followed suit and solidified the Legion's name in the official Star Wars universe. In 2005, the 501st Legion finally hit "mainstream" Star Wars canon with its inclusion in the novelization of Star Wars: Episode III: Revenge of the Sith. The blue clone troopers led into the Jedi Temple by Darth Vader in Revenge of the Sith are officially designated as the 501st Legion, with the nickname "Vader's Fist" because of his exclusive use of the unit. Although not mentioned in the film itself, all of the licensed support material and merchandising for the film make this reference, including Hasbro's 501st Legion action figures, the DK Publishing Star Wars Visual Dictionary books, and the Star Wars: Battlefront II game. The story-driven campaign mode of Battlefront II even expanded the role of the 501st Legion to the main fighting force in almost every battle in the "Clone Wars" and "Galactic Civil War" eras of Star Wars, from the Battle of Geonosis to the Battle of Hoth.

When the Star Wars: The Clone Wars feature film (2008) and television series were released in 2008, the 501st Legion was given the charismatic clone Captain Rex, a popular character, to lead them into battle.

The 501st name continued to appear in various Star Wars expanded universe media until its suspension and rebranding to Star Wars Legends in 2014.

== Mission statement ==
The 501st Legion is an all-volunteer organization formed for the purpose of bringing together costume enthusiasts from around the world under a collective identity. The 501st Legion seeks to promote interest in Star Wars through the building and wearing of high quality costumes, to facilitate the use of these costumes for Star Wars-related events, and to contribute to the local community through costumed charity and volunteer work.

== Membership ==
Membership requirements for applicants include being at least 18 years of age and have a documented ownership of at least one qualifying high-quality costume of a Star Wars villain. To maintain membership they must troop at least one local unit or Legion-level event per year and abide by the 501st Legion Code of Conduct.

The Legion's costuming standards are listed online in the 501st Legion Costume Reference Library (CRL). All costumes must meet the base requirements listed there in order to be considered for approval.

=== Legion identification numbers ===
Members of the 501st Legion refer to themselves by a letter-number combination, such as TK-899, TR-3774, or DZ-40201. This tradition originates from a line in Star Wars, "TK-421, why aren't you at your post?". The founder of the 501st Legion, Albin Johnson, decided that "Desert Troopers would be labeled "TD" and came from specialized training schools for their missions, Snowtroopers would be "TS", Biker Scouts would [become] "TB." as each group of costumes carries a specific letter designation.

Members of the Legion are issued with individual identification numbers upon joining. It becomes their number for life, and will never be given to anyone else, even after they die. Because of that, many members pick a number that has a significant meaning to them.

Combining a costume code with a member's identification number creates a unique in-universe designation for each Legion member and each one of their costumes. Member 8968 might be known as TK-8968, IG-8968, or TB-8968, depending on whether they are wearing a Stormtrooper, Imperial Gunner, or Biker Scout costume at the time.

=== The Galactic Academy ===
For Star Wars costumers who are under 18 years of age, the 501st Legion has partnered with its sister club, the Rebel Legion, to form a joint group for children called the Galactic Academy. The Galactic Academy deals with both "bad guy" and "good guy" costumes, has no member age requirement, and has no strict costume standards. It provides a safe environment for children of different age groups who share a love of Star Wars and costuming to connect with one another online.

== Organization ==
The Legion helps members to connect with fellow Star Wars costumers through two organizational networks: one based on geographical location and one based on costume types.

=== Local units ===
As a worldwide organization that fields dozens of appearance requests daily, the Legion has set up local units to better handle tasks like event coordination, promotion, recruitment, and discipline.

There are three kinds of local units.

- Garrisons are the largest type of local unit. One must have at least 25 active members, but there is no upward limit to how many members can belong to a garrison. There are 76 Garrisons worldwide, the largest of which is the German Garrison, with over 1000 members.
  - Squads are subdivisions of Garrisons, established to better serve members in distinct regions within a Garrison's territory. Squads are formed of at least 10 members of a Garrison, residing within a reasonably close, clearly defined geographic region. There is no requirement for a Garrison to have any squads, and many do not. Other Garrisons, especially those that cover large geographic areas, have several Squads to better serve their members. There are 78 squads amongst the Legion's Garrisons.
    - Outposts are the smallest Legion unit, and one can have as few as one Legion member. They are most often established when a new member joins the Legion and lives in an area that lies outside the borders of an existing Garrison. There are 30 Outposts in the Legion worldwide.

=== Detachments ===
While Garrisons, Squads, and Outposts contain members with all varieties of Legion costumes, bound by a common geographic region, Legion Detachments contain members who are tied together by a common costume, but who live all over the world.

There are sixteen Legion costume Detachments. Each is dedicated to researching, constructing, and promoting a distinct group of costumes in the 501st. The Legion's costume references are stored on the Detachment websites, and their message boards contain tutorials on how to build the costumes that they have domain over.

- Armored Cavalry Detachment: AT-AT Drivers, AT-ST Drivers and Armor Assault Commanders
- Blizzard Force: Snowtroopers, Galactic Marines, Snow Scouts, Wampas
- Bounty Hunters Guild: Bounty Hunters
- Clone Trooper Detachment: Clone Troopers from Episodes II and III, and the Star Wars: The Clone Wars television series
- First Imperial Stormtrooper Detachment: Stormtroopers
- Flagship Eclipse Detachment: Expanded Universe Characters (non-troopers)
- Imperial Gunnery Corps: Imperial Gunners
- Imperial Officer Corps: Imperial Officers, Imperial Crew, and Imperial Navy/Death Star Troopers
- Jolly Roger Squadron: T.I.E. Fighter Pilots
- Krayt Clan: Tusken Raiders, Jawas, Gamorrean Guards, and several denizens of Jabba's palace
- Mos Eisley Police Department: Sandtroopers
- Pathfinders Detachment: Biker Scouts, Kashyyyk Clone Scout Troopers, Shore Troopers
- Sith Lord Detachment: The Film-Canon Sith Lords: Darth Vader, Darth Sidious, Darth Maul, Darth Tyranus and Kylo Ren
- Sovereign Protectors: Emperor's Royal Guards
- Spec Ops Detachment: Expanded Universe Characters (troopers)
- Underworld Detachment: Pirates, Gangsters, Henchmen, Thieves, Smugglers, Thugs, Scum and Villiany

== Command structure ==
To supervise the Legion at the worldwide and local levels, the membership elects leaders every year, who in turn appoint command staffs to administrate day-to-day operations for the Legion as a whole, Garrisons, Squads, Outposts, and Detachments.

=== Legion officers ===
The following officers are collectively called Legion Command.

Legion Commanding Officer (LCO): The LCO is the top administrator and president of the club. The LCO appoints an administrative staff to assist with club operations, which may include but are not limited to formulating policies, moderating the Legion Council, and organizing partnerships with outside parties.

Legion Executive Officer (LXO): The LXO assists the LCO in club operations as vice-president. The LXO may perform duties as assigned by the LCO, and will act as club president in the absence of the LCO.

Legion Captain of the Guard (LCotG): The office of the LCotG interprets and enforces club rules. This officer serves as an impartial mediator for disputes among members or officers, oversees disciplinary hearings, moderates Legion elections, and maintains the Legion map of units.

Legion Membership Officer (LMO): The office of the LMO is responsible for reviewing and processing applications for membership and maintaining member information in the Legion database. The LMO drives costume policies, including acceptable costume types for membership and quality control of costume submissions. The LMO is the final arbiter of member costume issues and approvals. The LMO supervises and advises Detachments, Garrison Membership Liaisons, and Garrison Web Liaisons.

Legion Webmaster (LWM): The office of the LWM manages all Legion Web resources and advises unit Webmasters.

Legion Merchandising and Branding Officer (LMBO): The office of the LMBO oversees all Legion merchandise operations, including those of local units. The LMBO ensures that all merchandise projects adhere to rules and guidelines that govern the use of images, pricing, and distribution.

Legion Public Relations Officer (LPRO): The office of the LPRO serves as the Legion's advocate and primary point of contact with the public and outside parties. The LPRO serves as the executive editor of all Legion publications and multimedia productions. The office of the LPRO also serves as the primary point of contact for celebrities and VIPs.

Legion Charity Representative (LCR): The office of the LCR serves as the Legion's primary point of contact with outside charitable organizations. The LCR manages documentation of Legion charitable activities and may publish and promote the Legion's charity efforts to the membership and the public.

=== Unit officers ===
==== Garrison officers ====
Garrison Commanding Officer (CO or GCO): The CO is elected by the Garrison membership. The CO is the chief administrator of the Garrison and is responsible for the operations of the Garrison and the coordination of events that occur within the Garrison's boundaries. The CO is responsible for maintaining communications with the Legion Council and Legion Command. The CO also appoints the Garrison officers and staff, and administers local forum rules. The CO is the principal representative of the Garrison membership on the Legion Council, and is responsible for assigning additional required Council representatives from the Garrison.

Garrison Executive Officer (XO or GXO): The XO is appointed by the CO. The XO may perform duties as assigned by the CO, and will assume leadership of the Garrison in the absence of the CO.

Garrison Membership Liaison (GML): The GML is appointed by the CO. The GML is responsible for reviewing and processing applications for membership and maintaining Garrison member information in the Legion database. The GML reports to the CO and the LMO.

Garrison Public Relations Officer (GPRO): The GPRO is appointed by the Garrison Commanding Officer. The GPRO assists the CO in promoting the Unit to the public and also may be called upon by the Legion PRO to assist in the public promotion of the Legion.

Garrison Web Liaison (GWL): The GWL is appointed by the Garrison Commanding Officer. The GWL assists the GML in the preparation and management of the Garrison Membership Profiles and is directly responsible for the processing and management of the Garrison Members' profile images.

==== Squad officers ====
Squad Leader (SL): The SL is elected by the Squad's membership. The SL is the event coordinator for the local area in which the Squad operates. The SL reports directly to the parent Garrison's leadership.

==== Outpost officers ====
Outpost Leader (OL): The OL of an Outpost is elected by the Outpost membership. The OL is the chief administrator of the Outpost and is responsible for the operations of the Outpost and the coordination of events that occur within the Outpost's boundaries. The OL is responsible for maintaining communications with the Legion Council and Legion Command. The OL also appoints any necessary Outpost officers and staff, and administers local forum rules. The OL is the principal representative of the Outpost membership on the Legion Council.

=== Detachment officers ===
Detachment Leader (DL): The DL is elected by the Detachment membership. The DL is the chief administrator of the Detachment and is responsible for the operations of the Detachment and managing research and information about costume creation and construction. The DL also appoints any necessary Detachment officers and staff. DLs are supervised and represented on the Council by the LMO. A DL has the following responsibilities: Verify membership status in the Legion with the approved costume, and grant the appropriate access for active Legion members in good standing to detachments areas; monitor and moderate the Detachment forums, appointing additional moderators as needed; ensure that the Detachment Web site is properly maintained and the content therein is accurate and up to date; participate on the Legion forums and advise other DLs and GMLs as needed; maintain contact with the LMO and report any issue or controversy related to costuming.

== Appearances ==
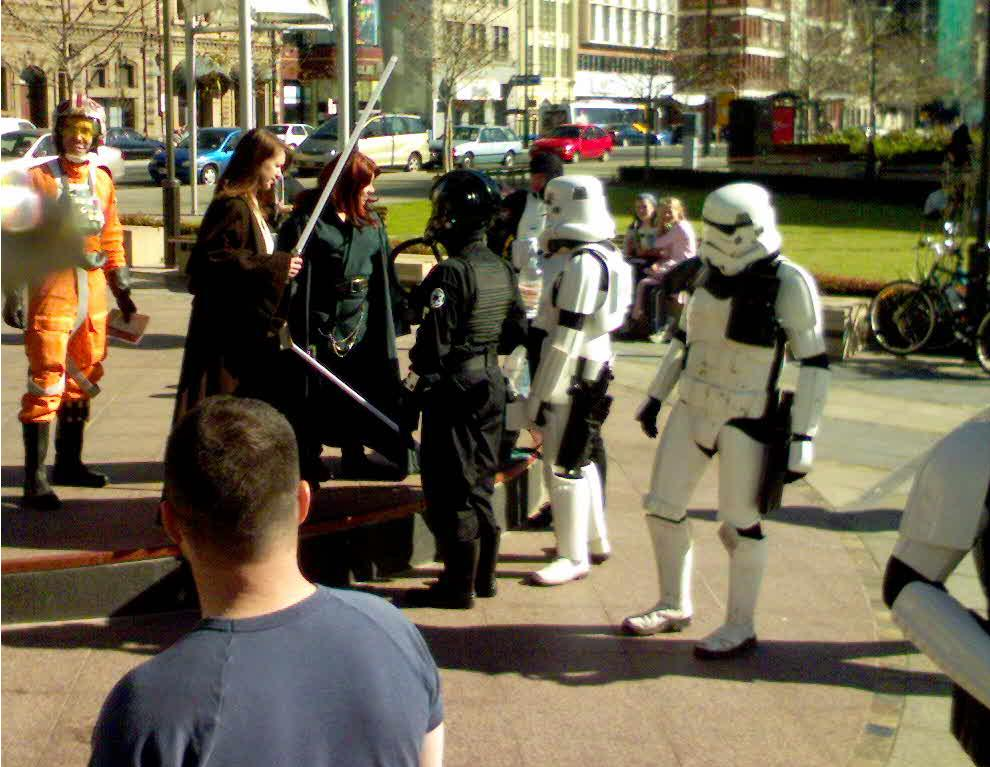
The Legion entertains the public during a science fair at the Adelaide public museum.

The 501st Legion appears at several different venues for myriad reasons.

=== Community events ===
Members of the 501st Legion participate in parades, school fairs, and community festivals.

=== Libraries ===
The 501st Legion has been called in frequently to support many Star Wars events at public libraries, aimed at encouraging literacy among younger fans of the franchise. Library "Star Wars days" (including events for the official "Star Wars Reads Day") are routinely among the most popular events on a library's calendar. Activities like Stormtrooper Story Time, Jedi training games, trivia contests, coloring and drawing activity stations, and appearances by the 501st Legion help make these events successful.

=== Hospitals ===
Members of the 501st Legion get frequently invited to appear at pediatric wards. When the 501st Legion appears in a hospital, they brighten the lives of children going through difficult trials and serious medical treatment.

Over the years, the 501st Legion has also been instrumental in granting the wishes of several Make-A-Wish children. Occasions such as these can make a difference for patients by providing them with some joy and comfort to them and their families during their treatments.

Scott Loxley of the 501st Legion was raising money for Monash Children's Hospital when he claims he was saved by stormtrooper armor from a bite on the shin by a deadly King Brown serpent near Yalboroo, Australia on January 14, 2015 as he walked down a road while walking entirely around the Australian continent.

=== Promotions ===
Although the 501st Legion is not sponsored by Disney or Lucasfilm, they often call, together with their partners, upon members of the Legion to help promote the commercial release of new Star Wars products and tie-ins.

Legion members have become an established attraction at Disney World's annual Star Wars Weekends, the Star Wars: Where Science Meets Imagination museum exhibit, and Free Comic Book Day events across the United States.

=== Professional sports ===
The 501st Legion has also partnered with various minor and major league sports franchises such as the National Hockey League, Major League Baseball, and National Basketball Association in recent years for special "Star Wars Nights". These events have brought record attendance numbers to games. Members of the 501st Legion have participated in games at the minor league hockey and baseball levels, college sports, the Arena Football League, and the National Football League.

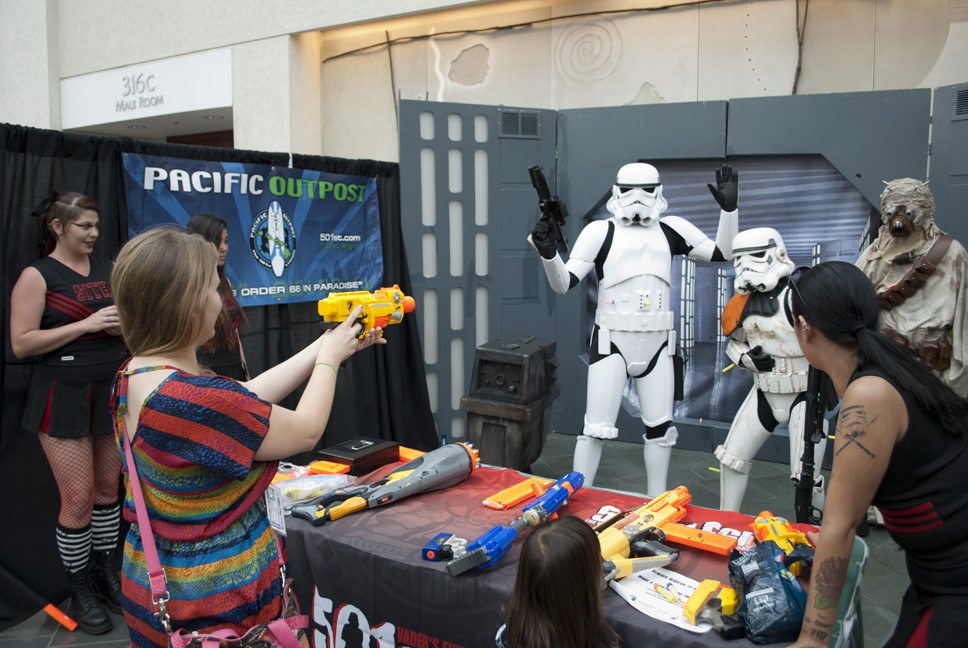
Troopers of the 501st Legion getting 'shot' with Nerf Blasters (foam darts) for charity during a convention

=== Conventions ===
At formal events, members typically appear to have walked off the screen when portraying characters. At informal events (such as local science fiction conventions), members often display their creativity with genre mash-ups of their costumes.

Members of the 501st Legion frequently attend fandom's larger conventions including Dragon Con, San Diego Comic-Con, MCM London Comic Con, the Wizard World Comic Cons, and Megacon (among scores of other Sci-Fi conventions) where they often host a fan table or booth where the public can learn more about the Legion, see costumes and props on display, and speak directly with members. At HeroesCon, their table is generally set up near the similarly-themed, Star Trek-based Klingon Assault Group, and the two have a friendly rivalry to see who can solicit the most donations for charity.

Some larger units of the Legion also sometimes conduct activities like the Droid Hunt and Blast-a-Trooper at conventions.

The Droid Hunt is a give-away game where convention attendees become "the droids we're looking for." After the "droids" are "captured" by Legion members, the game concludes with a drawing for dozens of prizes from sponsors like Sideshow Collectibles, DK Publishing, Hasbro, Del Rey Publishers, Hallmark, Kotobukiya, and many other Star Wars merchandise partners.

In the Blast-a-Trooper game, fans fire foam darts at Imperial characters in exchange for a donation to charity. Blast-a-Trooper ranges have raised thousands of dollars for worthy causes around the world.

=== Concerts ===
Legion units are often invited to appear on stage with symphonies and school bands who perform the music of John Williams.

Musician and comedian "Weird Al" Yankovic has invited members of the 501st Legion on stage during performances of his Star Wars-themed songs "Yoda" and "The Saga Begins", recruiting members of local garrisons while on tour. In appreciation, the 501st inducted Yankovic as a "Friend of the Legion", in September 2007.

Rock band No Doubt and country music band Sugarland have also invited 501st members up on stage during their performances in the past.

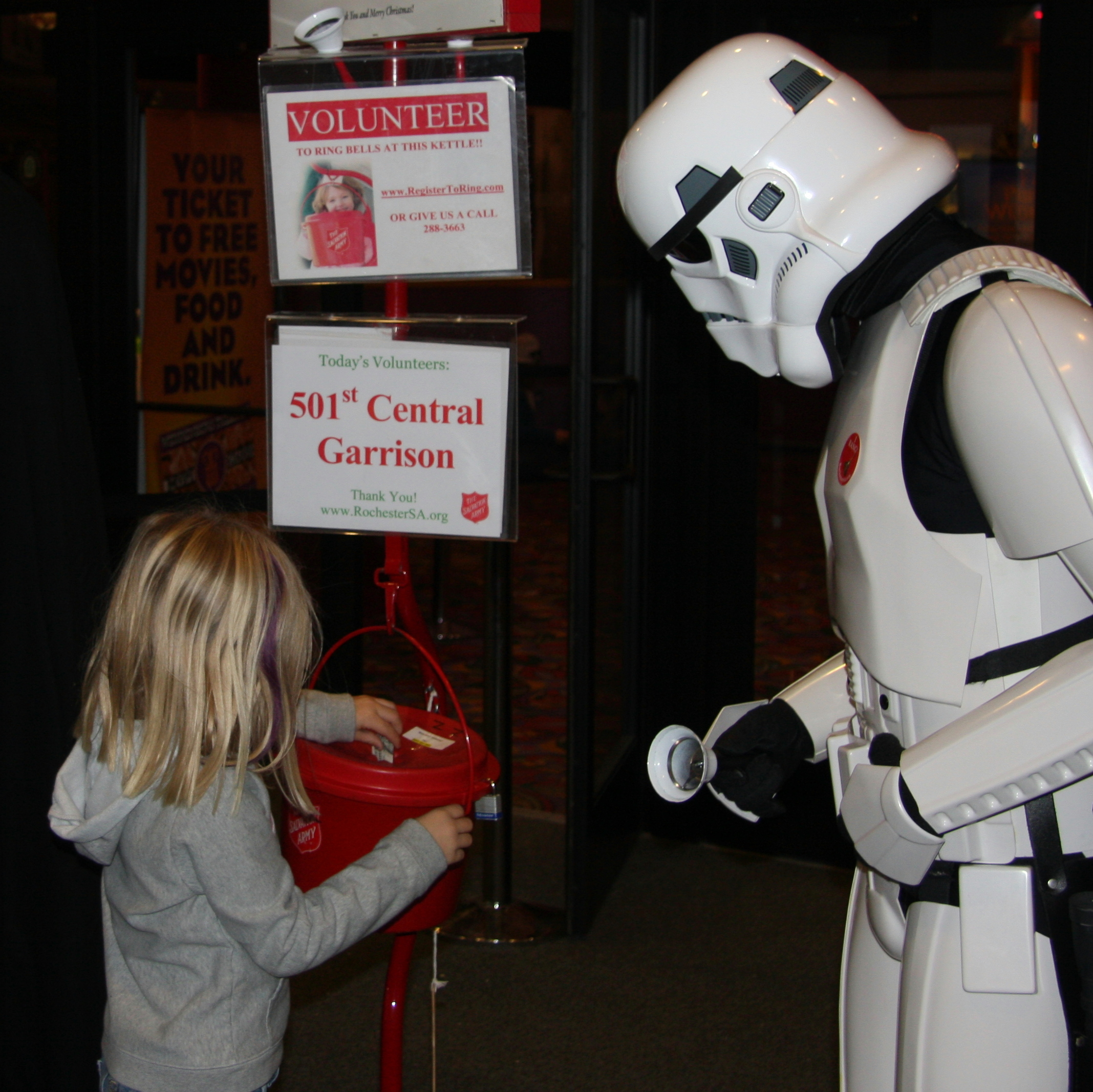
501st volunteer dressed as a stormtrooper soliciting donations for the Salvation Army

=== Television ===
For the MythBusters Star Wars special, entitled Revenge of the Myth and the 2014 season premiere, the Legion's Golden Gate Garrison joined Adam Savage, who is an honorary Legion member after working with ILM during the prequel trilogy, on the show. They featured in the tests of the myths of Luke's swing while carrying Leia across the Death Star chasm in A New Hope as they shot at Luke and Leia - played by Jamie Hyneman (inducted into the New England chapter of the 501st in 2014) and Sophia Bush - as they attempted the swing. They also chased after Jamie, Adam (as Han) and Sophia as the myth concluded for cinematic effect. A couple of them also featured in the background in a redwood forest similar to one on the Endor moon during tests of the Ewok log swing from Return of the Jedi alongside another ILM alumnus and honorary 501st member, Grant Imahara, as Han and Kari Byron as Leia.

Members were also featured on the Christmas 2012 episode of Extreme Makeover: Home Edition.

The Legion was called in to play stormtrooper extras for the official Star Wars series The Mandalorian after the pilot's directors realized that they did not have enough stormtrooper armor to complete a shot.

== Charitable works ==
Giving back to the community is one of the 501st Legion's highest priorities. Because of this, the 501st Legion proudly refers to themselves as the "Bad Guys Doing Good". Members regularly participate in events to raise awareness for charitable causes, from walk-a-thons to blood drives, and provide opportunities for fundraising through events such as their "Blast-A-Trooper" game, where donations are collected from the public to target armored characters with Nerf blasters.

In September 2016, the 501st Legion announced their commitment to a first-of-its kind international endowment in a unique partnership with Make-A-Wish. The 501st Legion Make-A-Wish Endowment Fund will allow Make-A-Wish America and Make-A-Wish International to grant more Star Wars-related wishes to children diagnosed with life-threatening medical conditions. The endowment fund allows Make-A-Wish to grant wishes, alternating between the United States and international locations every other year – a first for an endowment of this kind. The Endowment relies on contributions from its members, as well as the public. With a goal of $150,000 in the fund by 2021, the Endowment fund will grant wishes from the interest accrued; as the fund continues to grow, so will the number of wishes granted by the endowment.

The 501st Legion never charges a fee for an appearance, but they do welcome donations to a charity in honor of the Legion or the local Legion unit. If an event host does not have a charity of choice, Legion members frequently direct the donations to the Endowment Fund. In cases where the event host is itself a charitable organization, a donation is usually not accepted by the 501st Legion as they volunteer their time for that charitable organization.

In 2016, the members of the 501st donated over 182,000 hours of community service, raising over $889,000 USD in direct donations, and participated in events that helped raise over $46 million for charities worldwide.

== See also ==
- Rebel Legion
