= Sith Apprentice =

- Directed by: John E. Hudgens
- Written by: John E. Hudgens; Lowell Cunningham; Denny Humbard
- Produced by: John E. Hudgens
- Starring: Robert Alley; Robert E. Bean; Kristen Caron; Patrick McCray
- Distributed by: Z-Team Productions; Atomfilms
- Release date: March 29, 2005
- Running time: 12 minutes
- Language: English
- Budget: $1,000

Sith Apprentice is a Star Wars fan film that made its debut on the internet on March 29, 2005, directed by John E. Hudgens and co-written by Hudgens, Denny Humbard, and Men in Black creator Lowell Cunningham. Made for around $1000, it is a spoof of Star Wars and The Apprentice, with Emperor Palpatine filling the Donald Trump role in his search for a new apprentice. The final candidates in the film are Darth Vader, Darth Maul, Count Dooku, and Jar Jar Binks.

While the film primarily spoofs the Star Wars universe in the format of The Apprentice, there are several other notable targets, including swipes at The Princess Bride, Monty Python and the Holy Grail, Dracula, and The Lord of the Rings. In the film's standout sequence, Darth Vader takes to the stage, dancing Riverdance-style with a squad of stormtroopers.

At one point in the film, Vader cuts off Dooku's head and hands in a scene staged similarly to one in Revenge of the Sith where Anakin, not yet Vader, cuts off Dooku's hands and then proceeds to cut off his head. However, Sith Apprentice was written and filmed months before Revenge of the Sith premiered.

The film has proven popular with Star Wars fans, and won the Audience Choice Award in the Lucasfilm-sponsored 2005 Official Star Wars Fan Film Awards. In August 2010, Time magazine listed it as one of the Top 10 Star Wars fanfilms.

== Cast ==
- Robert Alley ... Darth Sidious
- Robert E. Bean ... Darth Vader
- Kristen Caron ... Darth Maul
- Patrick McCray ... Count Dooku
- Brandon Alley and James W. Williams... JarJar Binks
- Brian Boling ... Boba Fett
- Uncredited actor ... Jango Fett
- Amy Earhart ... Pink Five
- Heather Harris ... The FemTrooper
- John E. Hudgens ... The voice of Darth Vader
- Denny Humbard ... The Reluctant Jedi
- John Mailen ... The voice of JarJar Binks
- Sarah Mailen ... Emperor's Advisor #1
- Jeff McClure ... Emperor's Advisor #2
- Ziggy McMillan ... Darth Maul (voice)
- Tom Ott ... Imperial Admiral
- Christine Papalexis ... Yoda
- Stephen Stanton ... The voice of Yoda
