= The Official Star Wars Fan Film Awards =

Annual contest

The Official Star Wars Fan Film Awards logo

The Official Star Wars Fan Film Awards was an annual contest put forth by Lucasfilm and AtomFilms to showcase and acknowledge the growing genre of fan films made by, for, and about fans of the Star Wars saga. The inaugural contest in 2002 was the first time Lucasfilm had officially sanctioned the genre. In 2007, the contest was renamed the Star Wars Fan Movie Challenge. In 2012, Lucasfilm announced that the contest was being discontinued, and that the company was looking for "new ways for fans to share their creativity".

Lucasfilm later announced, via the official Star Wars website, that the Fan Film Awards would return in 2014, for the first time in three years, welcoming different genres and styles. The best short films of that year were screened at Star Wars Celebration 2015 in Anaheim, California. The awards were last held in 2018.

== Awards ==
The Official Star Wars Fan Film Awards trophy.

=== Rules ===
A number of guidelines ensure that entries are produced by amateurs and do not infringe on Lucasfilm properties. The contest limits the content of entries to short film and video parodies, mockumentaries, and documentaries of the Star Wars universe and fan experience. Until 2007, In-universe fan fiction-type stories were not allowed. Rules changed in 2007 after all Star Wars movies have been released and fan fiction is now allowed. The contest imposes a time limit on entries - for the inaugural contest, it was 30 minutes, but this was lowered to 15 for the 2003-2005 contests. For 2006 and 2007, the time limit was lowered again to 10 minutes. Entries must not contain nudity, excessive swearing, explicit sexual themes or graphic violence. In addition, no unlicensed copyrighted material may be used in the entries, with the exception of a collection of approved images, music and sound effects. For 2006 onward, the contest rules were revised to prohibit contributions that are subject to or under the "jurisdiction of any guild or union collective bargaining agreement." (This does not, however, prevent a contestant from submitting an entry if they happen to belong to a union. For example, an amateur film-maker who is also a truck driver that is a member of the Teamsters.)

=== Presentation ===
The awards have been presented at ceremonies held at either Comic-Con International or Lucas' Star Wars Celebration conventions. For the first contest in 2002, Kevin Smith hosted a special on the SciFi Channel to showcase the winners and some finalists. Winning films have been shown online at starwars.com, atom.com, and some have appeared on SpikeTV. In October 2008, a selection of winning films was shown in a special Star Wars Fan Movie Challenge-themed episode of Atom TV on Comedy Central.

=== Categories ===
The contest's grand prize is the George Lucas Selects Award, which is presented to the film Lucas himself selects as his favorite. The Audience Choice Award is selected by the worldwide internet audience, as all contest finalists are available to view online at Atom.com. The Pioneer Award is given to a film that either defined, changed, or influenced the genre. Other awards are given by a jury of people selected from employees of Atom.com and Lucasfilm. Beginning in 2004, some of the major awards were sponsored by Lucasfilm licensees.

== Winners ==
=== 2002 ===
- George Lucas Selects Award – Christmas Tauntauns; Matt Bagshaw, director
- Audience Choice Award – Star Wars Gangsta Rap; Thomas Lee, director
- Best Animation – Jar Jar's Walking Papers; Joe Fournier, director
- Best Documentary – Waiting for Jar Jar; Meredith Bragg, director
- Best Mockumentary – SW Project; Gregory Hiltz, director
- Spirit of Fandom Award – Figure Club; Matt Petrilla, director
- Young Jedi Award – Sparring Program; David Tomaszewski, director
- Best Comedy – Stargeeks; Marc A. Samson, director
- Best Short Subject – A New Dope; Chris Gortz, director
- Pioneer Award – Troops; Kevin Rubio, director

=== 2003 ===
- George Lucas Selects Award – Pink Five; Trey Stokes, director
- Audience Choice Award – The Jedi Hunter; John E. Hudgens, director
- Skywalker Sound Award – Carbonite; Mark Rusciano, director
- Best Animation – Trooper Clerks; Jeff Allen, director
- Spirit of Fandom Award – Silent But Deadly#2; Lou Tambone, Jeff Cioletti, directors
- Best Commercial Parody – Dark Side Switch Campaign; Daniel Johnson, director
- Pioneer Award – Hardware Wars; Ernie Fosselius, director

=== 2004 ===
- George Lucas Selects Award – Escape from Tatooine; David Tomaszewski, director
- Audience Choice Award – Pink Five Strikes Back; Trey Stokes, director
- Best Comedy – Recruitment; Scott Zier, director
- Best Animation – Wampa; Andreas Peterson, director
- Spirit of Fandom Award – 8 Minutes; Wendy Woody, director
- Best Crossover Spoof – Carbonite Confusion; Ryan Simmons, director
- Pioneer Award – George Lucas in Love; Joe Nussbaum, director

=== 2005 ===
- George Lucas Selects Award – For the Love of the Film; Barry Curtis & Troy Metcalf, directors
- Audience Choice Award – Sith Apprentice; John E. Hudgens, director
- Spirit of Fandom Award – Boba; Mark Rusciano, director
- Best Animation – Walk in a Bamboo Bush; Tetsuro Sakai, director
- Best Comedy – Cheap Seats; Robert Reeves, director
- Best Crossover Spoof – Anakin Dynamite; Wayne Barnes, director
- Best Original Concept – Star Wars: Elements; Robert Bunch, director
- Best Original Song – One Season More; Timothy Edward Smith, director
- Pioneer Award – Return of the Ewok; David Tomblin, director

=== 2006 ===
- George Lucas Selects Award – Pitching Lucas; Shane Felux, director
- Audience Choice Award – Pitching Lucas; Shane Felux, director
- Spirit of Fandom Award – Memoirs of a Padawan; Michael Q. Yowhan, director
- Best Comedy – Sith'd; Brian Silva, director
- Best Commercial Parody – Blue Milk; William Grammer, director

=== 2007 ===
- George Lucas Selects Award – Chad Vader - Day Shift Manager; Blame Society Productions, director
- Audience Choice Award – Forced Alliance; Randolph Bookman & Gerry Santos, directors
- Best Short Subject – Incident at Toshi Station; Tyler Soper, director
- Best Animation – IG-88: The Dancing Robot; Anton Bogaty, director
- Best Action – Essence of the Force; Pat Kerby, director
- Best Comedy – The Eyes of Darth Tater; Lee Vehe, director
- Best Fan Fiction – Forced Alliance; Randolph Bookman & Gerry Santos, directors

=== 2008 ===
- George Lucas Selects Award – Padmé; Robert Reeves, director
- Audience Choice Award – George Lucas Hip-Hop Awards; Kay Minckiewicz & Mark Minckiewicz, directors
- Best Comedy – Paraphrase Theater; Will Carlough, director
- Best Visual Effects – Ryan vs. Dorkman 2; Ryan Wieber & Michael Scott, directors
- Best Creature / Character Makeup – Contract of Evil; Lou Klein, director
- Best Short Subject – The Empire Strikes Back in 60 Seconds; Oliver Jones, director
- Best Parody – Star Wars Grindhouse: Don’t Go In The Endor Woods; Michael Ramova, director
- Best Animation – George Lucas Hip-Hop Awards; Kay Minckiewicz & Mark Minckiewicz, directors

=== 2009 ===
- George Lucas Selects Award - Star Wars Retold; Joseph Nicolosi, director
- Audience Choice Award - Saber; Clare Grant, Rileah Vanderbilt, Adam Green and Mike Civitano
- Best Action Award - Saber; Clare Grant, Rileah Vanderbilt, Adam Green and Mike Civitano
- Spirit of Fandom Award - Star Wars: Cinemagic; Joe Presswood, director
- Best Comedy Award - ''Star Wars: Episode XVI - Family Dysfuction'; Rich Scheirmann, director
- Best Animation Award - Star Wars in a Notebook; Oscar Triana, director
- Best Parody Award - Star Sports: Episode M - Theatrical Trailer; Jeff Capone, director

=== 2010 ===
- George Lucas Selects Award - The Unconscious Sith; Adam White
- Audience Choice Award - Renaissance (Redux);
- Best Action Heroes Award - Chronicles of Young Skywalker;
- Spirit of Fandom Award - Star Wars 70s Animation;
- Best Animation Award - The Solo Adventures;
- Best Sequel Award - The Notebook Strikes Back; Oscar Triana, director
- Best Cinematography Award - Makazie One;

=== 2011 ===
- George Lucas Selects Award – Star Wars: Unlimited Power; Eliot Sirota, director
- Audience Choice Award – A Light in the Darkness; Fed Wetherbee, director
- Spirit of Fandom – The Tentacle Trap; James Austen, director
- Best Acting – Star Wars: Hunter; Sash Nixon, director
- Best Animated Feature – Bounty Hunter II: Pit of Carkoon; Jim Mehsling, director
- Best Comedy – Solo Forever; Trey Albright, director
- Best Fan Fiction – A Light in the Darkness; Fed Wetherbee, director
- Best Sequel – The Unconscious Sith Strikes Back; Adam White, director

=== 2015 ===
- Filmmaker Select Award – Star Wars: The Lesser Evil; Sy Cody White & Andrew Kin, directors
- Audience Choice Award – Journey of a Fan Film"; Alexander Watson, director
- Best Non-Fiction Award – "Journey of a Fan Film; Alexander Watson, director
- Best Comedy Award – Bounty Buddies; Jordan & Cody Gustafson, directors
- Best Animation Award – "Star Wars: A New Employee Orientation; Collin Murphy & Jared Hundley, directors
- Spirit of Fandom Award – Force-Full Imagination; Jim Eimmerman, director
- Best Visual Effects – Knights of the Old Republic: Broken Souls; Jared Seaich, director

=== 2016 ===
- Filmmaker Select Award - "TK-436: A Stormtrooper Story"; Samgoma Edwards & Samtubia Edwards, directors
- Audience Choice Award - "The Sable Corsair"; Nick Finch & Jeffrey Henderson, directors
- Best Non-Fiction Award – "Force or Faith"
- Best Comedy Award – "Ben in the Desert - Jawas are Bad Neighbors"; Kevin Kelly, director
- Best Animation Award - "The Big Question"; Stefan Binter & Fabian Carl, directors
- Spirit of Fandom Award – "Star Wars: Generations"; Don Bitters III, director
- Best Visual Effects – "Star Malice Wars"

=== 2018 ===
==== Long Form ====
- Filmmaker Select Award - "More Machine Than Man"
- Audience Choice Award - "Like My Father Before Me"
- Best Animation Award - "The Kessel Run"
- Best Choreography Award - "Exile"
- Best Comedy Award – "More Machine Than Man"
- Spirit of Fandom Award – "Star Wars: The Toys Awaken"; Raymond Montemayor, director
- Best Stop Motion Award – "Star Wars: The Toys Awaken"; Raymond Montemayor, director
- Best Visual Effects Award – "Exile"

==== Short Form ====
- Filmmaker Select Award - "Ice Cream To Go"
- Audience Choice Award - "Vader: Misquoted"
- Best Animation Award - "Grievious versus Praetorians"
- Best Choreography Award - "Grievious versus Praetorians"
- Best Comedy Award – "Ice Cream To Go"
- Spirit of Fandom Award – "Simple Tricks and Nonsense"
- Best Stop Motion Award – "Ice Cream To Go"
- Best Visual Effects – "A Close Call"

== See also ==
- Star Wars Mini Movie Awards
