= TheForce.Net =

Star Wars news website

- The top of TFN's front page on December 25, 2013
- Website type: Star Wars news web site
- Owner: part-owned by Philip Wise
- Creators: Scott Chitwood and Darin Smith
- Website: www.theforce.net
- Commercial: Yes
- Registration: Optional
- Launched: 1996; 30 years ago

TheForce.Net ("TFN") is a Star Wars news website that provides updates on the Star Wars media franchise. The web site launched in 1996 as the "Star Wars Site At Texas A & M." It was founded by Scott Chitwood and Darin Smith. TFN is officially "TheForce.Net, LLC," and is currently part-owned by Philip Wise, who also runs the Star Wars collecting news site Rebelscum.com.

== Content ==
The main page of TheForce.Net features the site's news coverage. There are categories for movies, television, literature, games, and the fan community. Several categories also have special sections. For example, the television category hosts reviews of the TV show Star Wars: The Clone Wars, and the literature category hosts TFN's book release schedule and its literature reviews.

In addition to its function as a news site, TFN also archives a variety of media and resources. In the summer of 2000, the site hosted a fake movie trailer for Star Wars: Episode II – Attack of the Clones that included actors Leonardo DiCaprio and Hayden Christensen. The trailer surpassed one million downloads and generated favorable publicity for the movie itself.

TFN hosts astrophysicist Dr. Curtis Saxton's Star Wars Technical Commentaries, a set of documents exploring the nature and limits of the technology in Star Wars. Dr. Saxton has also written Incredible Cross Sections of Star Wars: Attack of the Clones and Incredible Cross-sections of Star Wars: Revenge of the Sith, two publications by Dorling Kindersley which draw on material from the SWTC.
