= Men in Black (franchise) =

Science fiction media franchise

- Created by: Lowell Cunningham
- Original work: The Men in Black
- Owners: Sony Pictures Entertainment; Amblin Entertainment (films); Marvel Comics (publication)
- Years: 1990–present

Print publications
- Comics: The Men in Black

Films and television
- Film(s): Men in Black; Men in Black II; Men in Black 3; Men in Black: International
- Animated series: Men in Black: The Series

Games
- Role-playing: Men in Black: The Roleplaying Game
- Video game(s): Men in Black: The Game; Men in Black: The Series; Men in Black 2: The Series; Men in Black: The Series – Crashdown; Men in Black II: Alien Escape; MIB: Alien Crisis

Audio
- Soundtrack(s): Men in Black: The Album; Men in Black II; Men in Black 3

Miscellaneous
- Theme park attraction(s): Men in Black: Alien Attack

Men in Black is an American science fiction comedy media franchise that originated with the Malibu/Marvel comic book of the same name created by American author Lowell Cunningham. The franchise focuses on the titular non-governmental organization which monitors and regulates paranormal and alien activity on Earth while preventing civilians from finding out about it. The most notable agents within the organization are J, K, and Zed. The franchise has been adapted into other media including a series of four films, an animated television series, video games, and a theme park attraction.

== Premise ==
The Men in Black as shown in the movies is a secret organization devoted to policing and monitoring extraterrestrial activity on Earth. The Men in Black, founded in the U.S. in the mid-1950s, began as a small and poorly funded government organization devoted to making contact with extraterrestrial life known as the Baltians. They were initially seen as a joke, but did make contact on March 2, 1961, outside New York City.

It was decided to make Earth an apolitical zone for aliens without a planet, and the organization broke its government ties to become the Men in Black, which became the force to conceal and police the aliens that came to Earth, no longer answerable to the government and therefore not obligated to answer any questions or respond to outside demands. The founding members were the seven agents present at the landing, plus an amateur astronomer and a teenager who got lost going to see his girlfriend. This last became Agent K, who later came to be regarded as the agency's best agent, and one of the agents became his partner D. The MIB has continued since then, with Zed as its chief, to protect the normal citizens of Earth from alien threats and police extraterrestrial immigrants. Other notable members include Agents B, J, and L.

MIB agents sever all ties with their former lives and have all traces of their previous identities erased. They dress in black suits specifically chosen to avoid creating any lasting impression on civilians who see them. Their fingerprints and any other unique identifying features are erased, and they are issued neuralyzers to use in erasing the memories of civilian witnesses and Ray-Ban sunglasses to protect themselves against the device's effects. They have access to a wide array of alien weaponry and other technologies for use during missions. Retiring agents are neuralyzed to wipe their memories of working for MIB and may have their previous identities restored. The agency possesses a "deneuralyzer" that can restore retired agents' memories in emergency situations.

No longer receiving federal funding from the government, the MIB are supported by the patents they hold on various confiscated alien innovations, including liposuction, the microwave oven, and velcro. Their standard operating day is based on Centaurian time, which lasts 37 hours, 16 of which an agent must spend on duty. Their main base is located at 504 Battery Drive in New York City.

The Men in Black have bases in other locations, including one in the western United States (Zone 16), one mobile undersea base, and a Los Angeles division (dubbed "The Agency"). The three other founding members became Agent T, H and Q. In the animated series, an agent known as Alpha was said to be the first chief of the MIB; after he went rogue, Zed became the chief. With the release of the films Men in Black II and Men in Black 3, most if not all elements of the Men in Black animated series have been verified as non-canon and taking place in an alternate continuity.

== Comics ==
The story and show franchise originated in the medium of comic books.

The original The Men in Black comic books were published in 1990 and 1991.

The Men in Black are a secret organization that monitors and suppresses paranormal activity on Earth (including aliens, demons, monsters, and mutants), while keeping the populace ignorant of its happenings.

== Films ==
The series was adapted into a film in 1997, titled Men in Black, starring Tommy Lee Jones as Agent K and Will Smith as Agent J, with Barry Sonnenfeld as director. The film went on to become a commercial success, grossing US$587 million worldwide on a $90 million budget and earning a 91% rating from review aggregation website Rotten Tomatoes. A sequel, Men in Black II, was released in 2002 which saw both Jones and Smith reprising their roles. The film was a box office success, earning $441 million worldwide. Despite its success, the film was less critically acclaimed than its predecessor and received average reviews from critics with a score of 39% on Rotten Tomatoes. A third installment, Men in Black 3, was released ten years after the second film on May 25, 2012. It was also the first film in the series to be released in 3D. The film saw Smith and Jones reprise their roles, with Josh Brolin and Jemaine Clement joining the cast. It scored a 70% on Rotten Tomatoes. Despite talks with James Bobin to direct, the idea was dropped in May 2016.

A spin-off film, Men in Black: International was released in 2019. The film stars Chris Hemsworth, Tessa Thompson, Liam Neeson and Emma Thompson.

== Television ==
An animated television series, Men in Black: The Series, aired from 1997 to 2001. The show was based on the films, taking place after the events of the first film. There are a few changes, such as Agent K apparently not having his memory erased.

== Video games ==
The first Men in Black video game, Men in Black: The Game, was released for Windows 95 in 1997, followed by a release for the PlayStation. The game, developed by Gigawatt Studios and published by SouthPeak Interactive, is loosely based on the 1997 film.

Another game, titled Men in Black: The Series, was released for the Game Boy Color in 1999, and is based on the animated television series.

It was followed by a sequel in 2000, titled Men in Black 2: The Series and also for the Game Boy Color. In 2001, a version of Men in Black: The Series was released for the Game Boy Advance.

Men in Black: The Series – Crashdown was released later in 2001, for the PlayStation.

In 2002, a video game partially based on the second film was released, titled Men in Black II: Alien Escape.

A video game published by Activision entitled MIB: Alien Crisis was released in May 2012, around the time when the third movie was released.

== Novels ==
Bantam Books made a series of novels consisting of two movie tie-ins and two original novels. The first film was written by Steve Perry while the second film was written by Esther Freisner. Two original novels were written by Dean Wesley Smith and both take place after the events of the first film where Agent J recruits Agent L as his new partner while Agent K, who was absent, though mentioned, on both novels, resigns. In "The Green Saliva Blues", released in June 1999, J and L team up as they fight off the Zahurians from planting the entire atmosphere. And in "The Grazer Conspiracy", released in January 2000, J and L are back as thousands of extraterrestrial warships are currently massing over the globe. The most despised aliens in the cosmos, the Grazers, were invited for dinner by someone on Earth.

A junior novelization of the first film was written by J. J. Gardner and was published by Scholastic.

The novelization for the third film was not adapted.

In 2019, Titan Books released a novelization for MIB International and was written by R. S. Belcher. It also includes a short story prequel.

== Other ==
Will Smith, who played Agent J in the films, released two rap singles based on the films: "Men in Black" (from Men in Black: The Album) and "Black Suits Comin' (Nod Ya Head)" (from Men in Black II: The Soundtrack).

Men in Black: The Roleplaying Game was published by West End Games in 1997.

The theme park ride Men in Black: Alien Attack at the Universal Studios Florida theme park is based on the film Men in Black, as is the parody film Men in White.

In August 2015, Air New Zealand released a Men in Black themed safety video featuring members of the All Blacks, Rip Torn (reprising his role as Zed), and Frank the Pug.
