= Men in Black: The Game =

1997 video game

- North American Windows cover art
- Developers: Gigawatt Studios; The Collective (PS1)
- Publishers: NA: SouthPeak Interactive; EU: Gremlin Interactive
- Producer: David Koenig
- Programmers: Robert Knaack; Dan Cotton
- Artist: Yoni Koenig
- Composer: Ira Cord Rubnitz
- Series: Men in Black
- Platforms: Microsoft Windows; PlayStation
- Release: Windows: NA: November 18, 1997; EU: 1997; PlayStation: EU: April 4, 1998
- Genre: Survival horror
- Mode: Single-player

Men in Black: The Game is an adventure video game developed by Gigawatt Studios for Microsoft Windows in 1997. Though it is a licensed game based on the 1997 film Men in Black, the plot is unrelated and it is a survival horror game as opposed to being a comedy. It is most likely a homage to the original The Men In Black comic book created by Lowell Cunningham with its dark aesthetics and 2D cinematics that resemble comic book panels. The game was ported to the PlayStation in 1998 by The Collective.

== Gameplay ==
Men in Black: The Game is a survival horror game played from a third-person perspective, with fixed camera angles and pre-rendered backgrounds much like Resident Evil. The game is divided across four levels and each one includes puzzles that must be solved in order to progress. Aside from the first level where the only playable character is Agent J, Agents J, K, and L are selectable in the other three levels. The dialogue changes based on which Agent the player chooses, but the mission and game progression stays the same.

The player character can jump, kick, punch, examine items, and dodge attacks. The player must find key cards, deactivate security systems, and read messages to proceed through each level, while fighting enemies that include grey aliens, large bugs, and spore frogs. There are nine weapons featured in the game. Two are earthling weapons, including an M1911 pistol (only used by J.) and Sawed-off Shotgun. The other seven are alien weapons, including the neuralyzer. De-Atomizer Pistol, Series 4 De-Atomizer, Noisy Cricket, Carbonizer, Single-barrel Plasma Gun and Tri-barrel Plasma Gun. Only one weapon can be used for each level. Fist fights against enemies occur frequently due to a limited amount of ammunition. The Windows version does not support the use of a gamepad.

All cutscenes are shown in 2D animation in the style of a comic book. Both the PC and PlayStation versions are identical except for the saving system; the former allows the player to save manually at any point in the game whereas the latter can only be saved when accomplishing mission objectives.

== Story ==
NYPD undercover officer James Darrell Edwards III is sent to investigate a robbery in an apartment. After successfully defusing a bomb and discovering the burglar is an alien, he is approached by Agent K, a member of the Men In Black organization, which monitors extraterrestrials living on Earth. Seeing how skillful Edwards is, Agent K recruits him and he subsequently becomes Agent J.

In his first MIB meeting, Chief Zed briefs Agent J alongside K and L that they have lost contact with the MIB division located in the Arctic and are sending one of the agents to investigate (the player can choose to be Agents J, K or L). After realizing the people there are suffering from delusions and a strange flu, the player locates a secret alien lab underneath the Arctic base filled with the brains of the missing MIB agents, as well as their suits in preservation tanks. A self-destruct sequence is initiated and the player manages to escape in time.

Back in the MIB HQ, Zed sends the player to the Amazon, where there has been a report of bizarre occurrences. The mine workers claim to have been attacked by non-humanoid beings. Upon arrival, the player finds an informer who confirms the report is true and that several workers have lost their sanity due to the shock. The player enters the mine and discovers several aliens inhabiting the area, including an alien bug that acts as their leader. After eliminating the threat, the player returns to base.

In a new briefing, the player learns the mining company is connected to Skip Frales, a computer mogul who lives on a remote island. Agent H was sent there to investigate, but has not been heard from since. On the island, the player finds a secret alien underground base where Frales is hiding. Using alien technology, he builds a mech suit to eliminate the player, but is unsuccessful.

After rescuing Agent H, Zed grants all agents who are involved in the operation a well-deserved 48 hour R&R.

== Development and release ==
Gigawatt Studios had been interested in creating a Men in Black video game before the film was completed. SouthPeak Interactive announced the game in 1997, with plans to release it for Windows 95 on November 25 of that year, to coincide with the home video release of the film. Actors who appeared in the film had their faces texture mapped onto the character models. The game uses more than 200 backgrounds that were pre-rendered, while the model characters are made up of 500 polygons. The Windows version was released in the United States on November 18, 1997.

== Reception ==
Reception

Aggregate score
Aggregator	Score
GameRankings	PC: 43% PS: 64%

Review scores
Publication	Score
Computer Games Magazine	2.5/5
Computer Gaming World	2/5
Computer and Video Games	1/10
GameRevolution	C+
GameSpot	3.4/10

SouthPeak launched the game with a shipment of 100,000 units. In the United States alone, the computer version of Men in Black: The Game sold 4,883 copies and earned $200,989 by November 30, 1997. Between January 1998 and July 1998, it sold another 49,520 copies in the region, which drew an additional $1,423,382 in revenues.

Steve Poole of Computer Gaming World criticized the Windows version for its short length, its "strained attempts to duplicate the film's humor", and its lack of gamepad support. Poole wrote, "Serious gamers will be dissatisfied with the lack of depth, and casual gamers lured by the movie tie-in will be left cold by the game's average graphics and lethargic voice-acting."

Lauren Fielder of GameSpot criticized the artificial intelligence and poor controls, and wrote that the game might have been more fun if "you could at least run quickly." Fielder also criticized problems involving the player's ability to perform certain actions: "Unless you are lined up directly in front of your object, you can't act. And jumps are quite improbable even once you align yourself; for example, you can't hop up on a box unless you're right in front of it." Fielder concluded that "it's quite obvious the time and energy went into set design and mediocre character animations, not into actually making the game work." Fielder noted that the sound effects in the first level were "fairly interesting", but "it too goes downhill, with your character's insistent one-liners and the endlessly looped 'climactic moment' music churning in the background."

Calvin Hubble of Game Revolution noted the poor artificial intelligence, but praised the character animations for bearing resemblance to their film counterparts, and wrote that the graphics were "decent enough to pass." However, Hubble noted that each of the game's menus and loading screens "have an extremely simple, bold, solid-color font. [...] I could have made a better interface given Photoshop and about a day." Kim Randell of Computer and Video Games called the first level "incredibly pedantic", and wrote, "The combat system is fiddly, and the murky backgrounds sometimes make your grasp of the scene less than complete. Later on it looks and sounds cool, but with a continuing frustration factor."

John Altman of Computer Games Magazine wrote, "As an action/adventure game, MIB is a qualified success – fairly entertaining but thoroughly unoriginal. As the latest product from the Men In Black franchise, the game is a disappointment; the original spirit has been lost, replaced by occasional wit and generous doses of carnage." Altman concluded, "Hardcore fans of MIB will be disappointed to discover that the game is fairly pedestrian and generic, but gamers know that few things in life go together as well as killing aliens and making droll remarks. There's fun to be found here; it's just a matter of keeping your expectations reasonable."
