= Men in Black: The Series (video game) =

1998 video game

- Developers: Tiertex Design Studios (GBC version); David A. Palmer Productions (GBA version)
- Publisher: Crave Entertainment: EU: Ubi Soft (GBA)
- Producers: Mike Arkin (GBC version); Dave Palmer (GBA version)
- Composers: Mark Ortiz (GBC version); Mark Cooksey (GBA version)
- Series: Men in Black
- Platforms: Game Boy Color; Game Boy Advance
- Release: Game Boy Color: NA: December 14, 1998; EU: February 26, 1999; Game Boy Advance: NA: September 11, 2001; EU: September 28, 2001
- Genres: Action, platform
- Mode: Single player

Men in Black: The Series is an action platform video game developed by Tiertex Design Studios and published by Crave Entertainment for the Game Boy Color (GBC) on December 14, 1998. The game is based on the animated television series of the same name, and was followed by a sequel titled Men in Black 2: The Series, released for the Game Boy Color in 2000.

In May 2001, Crave announced plans for another game, also titled Men in Black: The Series, to be released on the Game Boy Advance (GBA). The game, developed by David A. Palmer Productions, was released in the US on September 11, 2001, while a European version was released on September 28, 2001.

== Gameplay ==
The Game Boy Color version is a side-scrolling platform video game. The player controls Agent J, a member of the Men in Black organization, a secret government agency which monitors extraterrestrials who live on Earth and prevents the human public from discovering their presence. The player's task is to kill alien enemies who plan to take over the Earth. The player faces 12 different types of aliens across six levels in Manhattan, including sewers, rooftops, an airport, and the Men in Black headquarters. Some alien enemies pop out of the ground while others can fly or camouflage themselves to imitate objects such as bicycles or road signs. The player must also battle against boss enemies, including the leader of the invasion: an alien who is hiding out deep in the Men in Black headquarters. A brief cartoon-style full motion video (FMV) appears at the end of each level. The game includes three difficulty settings, and a password feature.

The Game Boy Advance version is also a side-scrolling platform game, in which the player chooses to play as either Agent J or Agent K. The game features six levels, a password feature, and multiple weapons that must be used against aliens who are plotting an invasion of Earth. Weapons include the Noisy Cricket and the neuralyzer.

== Reception ==
Reception

Aggregate score
Aggregator	Score	
Aggregator	GBA	GBC
GameRankings	N/A	27%

Review scores
Publication	Score	
Publication	GBA	GBC
AllGame	N/A	1.5/5
Computer and Video Games	N/A	2/5
Game Informer	N/A	4.75/10
GameSpot	N/A	4.3/10
IGN	2/10	3/10
Nintendo Power	N/A	6/10

On GameRankings, the Game Boy Color version has a rating of 27%.

Alex Huntala of Computer and Video Games wrote about the Game Boy Color version, "There are some nice cutscenes and even a pretty cool intro that's very stylish for Game Boy, but at the end of the day, the game is rather simple and one from which you'll soon tire." Game Informer wrote "we'll never play this game again. MIB looks great on the GB Color, but the gameplay is complete misery."

Peer Schneider of IGN called the Game Boy Color version "a very formulaic action game with little variety and sub-par gameplay. Both the game speed and the control feel much too sluggish for a shooter, resulting in a repetitive game of walk, stop, jump, shoot. On the positive side, Men in Black does sport some nice backgrounds and cool animated FMV intro sequences. But unless you're more into watching a game than actually playing it, stay clear of this Game Boy Color bore."

Jon Thompson of AllGame, who considered the Game Boy Color version "a complete waste of potential," stated, "Featuring only the most basic gameplay possible, MIB fails to conjure up any of the fun and excitement of the film and show that inspired it, and ultimately boils down to a slow, boring experience". Thompson wrote that the levels "possess no gameplay elements that separate them from the other levels, and end up being simply window dressing for the same repetitive gameplay that grows old after level number one. Nothing changes over the course of the game. Even your weapons remain the same. From start to finish, the title is stale." Thompson concluded, "If it had come out in 1990, it might have been more acceptable."

Cameron Davis of GameSpot criticized the Game Boy Color version for its graphics: "Aliens take the form of misshapen, barely recognizable sprites, hardly worthy of fear or even base acknowledgement. Backgrounds are drab and unimaginative. They repeat far too often [...]. As far as in-game graphics go, only the slick animation of the game's main character is worthy of redemption. MIB's graphical highlights come in the form of the animated intros and cutscenes that pepper this cart. The intro scene is particularly good, although it would have been nice if these visual niceties didn't come at the expense of actual gameplay."

Craig Harris of IGN reviewed the Game Boy Advance version and wrote, "This game has everything that makes a game bad -- horrible animation, limited controls, and gameplay design that's just downright unbearable when put into action."
