= MIB: Alien Crisis =

2012 video game

- North American Xbox 360 cover art
- Developer: Fun Labs
- Publisher: Activision
- Designer: Emil Anghel
- Programmer: Daniel-Sabin Delion
- Artist: Tudor Popa
- Series: Men in Black
- Platforms: PlayStation 3, Wii, Xbox 360
- Release: NA: May 22, 2012; EU: May 25, 2012
- Genre: Rail shooter
- Modes: Single-player, multiplayer

MIB: Alien Crisis (also referred to as Men in Black: Alien Crisis) is an on-rails third-person shooter video game for the PlayStation 3, Wii, and Xbox 360. It was developed by Fun Labs and published by Activision. The game is the third installment in the Men in Black series of video games. Instead of Agent J or Agent K, the game features a new MIB agent named Agent P (Peter Delacour). The game was released on May 22, 2012. Alien Crisis is partially based on the Men in Black 3 movie and coincided with its launch in theaters. Tim Blaney reprises his role as Frank the Pug from the first two films.

== Plot ==
In 2012, Peter Delacour (voiced by Troy Baker), a master thief and alien conspiracist, is hired to steal an ancient Egyptian artifact called the Book of Khnemu for his client: network maven Emilio Chauncey (voiced by Josh Gad). However, once he gives it to him, Chauncey, wanting to use the book's power to take over the world, tells his bodyguards to get rid of any evidence, including Delacour. Peter narrowly escapes when it looks like a street gang engages Chauncey's men in a firefight with strange weapons. Chauncey gets away and shortly after, the MIB show up. Agent C (voiced by Laura Bailey), a MIB desk clerk, and Frank the Pug takes Delacour into custody and uses an MIB car in hyper drive mode to get Peter back to MIB headquarters for questioning. After interrogation, Delacour tries to stealthily escape MIB headquarters, but is caught. With the fact that J and K went missing on the same investigation and the fact that Chauncey is apparently helping the Adorians, an alien race that is part of a war that is making its way to Earth, Agent O has no choice but to deputize Peter into helping retrieve the book.

At a party in Chauncey's rooftop penthouse for his new program "C-YA", C manages to keep Chauncey occupied long enough for Peter to slip into Chauncey's study and steal the book. While there they find confirmation that Chauncey is indeed in some sort of partnership with the Adorians and that he somehow turned J and K into statues. Peter and C take the book to Professor Thurgood, a curator at the New York Museum of History who had Peter fired because of his theories. C tells Peter that Thurgood is actually an alien, which angers him due to the fact that he was holding information about himself out on him. Peter is further enraged when Thurgood pretends to know nothing about the Book of Khnemu even though evidence around his study says otherwise. However, before they can get any real answers out of him, the Adorians break in and steal the book back. The two follow them to Chauncey's New Mexico mansion where they discover a downed Adorian ship trapped in a mountain, which explains how Chauncey contacted the Adorians in the first place.

By hacking into the ships mainframe, they discover how the war began: it came about when the Adorian prince Khnemu and Netheera, the daughter of the Nakkadan prime minister, were supposed to be married, with Earth being a neutral zone for it to happen. However, their ships were sabotaged and trapped in nullspace. The book is the only thing powerful enough to free the ship, allowing whoever finds it to tip the war in their favor. Chauncey and his Adorian allies quickly capture them soon thereafter. Chauncey explains to them that his network is embedded with Adorian coding, allowing him to take control of every person's mind on Earth once he helps the Adorians win the war. He then forces Peter to read a passage from the book thinking it will power the ship. However, it backfires against him, allowing Khnemu to possess Chauncey and setting the ship to self-destruct. C and Peter manage to escape the blast, but Khnemu is right on their tail. They manage to use the car's weaponry to kill Khnemu, but the explosion caused the Nakkadan ship to be freed as well.

Out of leads, C and Peter return to the museum only to discover it to be crawling with Nakkadans. They manage to sneak around them and find Thurgood half frozen in some sort of residue. Peter pressures Thurgood into revealing the truth: he is actually an emissary of the Chtala Initiative sent to Earth to make sure the book and an Orb of Netheera didn't fall into the wrong hands. Now that the book had been captured and the Nakkadan ship exposed, Thurgood feels it's better to leave Earth and let his superiors handle the problems. However, Peter reminds him that his actions have been interfering with MIB's jurisdiction and forces him to reveal the Orb's hiding place.

With his end of the deal satisfied, C prepares to neuralyze Peter back to before he stole the book of Khnemu. However, she is immediately possessed by Netheera's spirit. Thurgood's office is then swarmed by Nakkadan soldiers and Peter has to fight his way to a fountain in Central Park. There, he finds Netheera and two Nakkadan generals using a nullspace portal to make their way to the ship and follows them through. After fighting his way through the ship, he corners Netheera at a command module. Netheera tells Peter she plans to destroy Earth for its indirect involvement in Khnemu's death and taunts Peter's romantic feelings for C before turning into a giant scorpion like creature to deal with him. Peter manages to defeat her by trapping her under one of the ships machines and escaping with a barely conscious C as the ship explodes.

Back at MIB headquarters, Peter tells C that while he cares for her, he's fully aware MIB agents aren't allowed to fraternize with each other. O congratulates the two for their success and tells Peter (who she calls Agent P) she's considering bringing him on full-time as the head of a division designated with locating alien artifacts, starting with a downed UFO in Central America.

== Reception ==
Reception

Review scores
Publication	Score
Eurogamer	2/10
GameSpot	2.5/10

MIB: Alien Crisis was universally panned with critics because of its gameplay concepts specifically criticising it for its weak story, repetitive gameplay and graphics. GameSpot's Chris Watters opined, "Ugly, boring, and brazenly priced, MIB: Alien Crisis is an absolute embarrassment," giving it a 2.5 score out of 10. Robert Workman of GameZone gave the game a score of 2.0, "Everything about Men In Black: Alien Crisis has "rush job" written all over it." Official Xbox Magazine editor Cameron Lewis gave it a score of 3.0, commenting, "There's just no way this charmless slapdash mess is worth anywhere near its asking price, much less your hard-earned recreation time."
