= Men in Black: The Series – Crashdown =

2001 video game

- Developer: Runecraft
- Publisher: Infogrames
- Producers: Tina Scholefield-Nicholson; Tony Barkley; David T. Brown
- Designers: Paul Tapper; Matthew Hardingham; Gary Edwards
- Programmer: Ben Dixon
- Series: Men in Black
- Platform: PlayStation
- Release: NA: November 20, 2001
- Genres: First-person shooter, puzzle
- Mode: Single-player

Men in Black: The Series – Crashdown is a first-person shooter video game based on the animated television series, Men in Black: The Series. The game was developed by Runecraft and published by Infogrames for the PlayStation. It was released in November 2001 to mixed reception.

== Gameplay ==
The game's story revolves around extraterrestrial terrorists causing damages to New York City. The player chooses to play as either Agent J or Agent K, who must stop the attempted alien invasion. The game is a first-person shooter consisting of 26 levels that are spread across various locations. Maps are provided to the player for each level. Agent Zed, the leader of the Men in Black, briefs the player in cutscenes that appear in between levels. In each level, players must complete various goals to advance.

The player must defend against various alien enemies that are capable of walking, crawling, flying, and hanging from ceilings. If the player kills a civilian or fails an objective, the level ends and a player is required to start a level over again. The player begins with a pistol-like weapon, with more weapons being obtained throughout the game. Rather than using ammunition clips, the player must reload weapons at charging stations that are scattered throughout each level and are disguised as objects such as payphones, automated teller machines, and vending machines.

== Plot ==
When "space rednecks" begin running amok on Coney Island, Agent J and Agent K are dispatched to deal with them, and prevent them from fleeing the Earth. After dealing with the Coney Island situation, K is sent to investigate a prison ship that crash landed in a junkyard, and rounds up most of the rioting convicts; one of the escapees is K's archenemy, the rogue MIB founder Alpha. While on routine patrol of the New York City subway, J apprehends one of the fugitives, a Crustaahl who he escorts back to the MIB headquarters.

Frank the Pug informs K that the Godfather, an alien crime lord, is undergoing emergency surgery at New York Hospital. K protects the Godfather from assassins, but the Godfather misconstrues K's actions as an attempt on his life and swears vengeance on the MIB. Elsewhere, the diminutive Fmeks have set up an outpost in preparation for an invasion of Earth, but it is infiltrated and destroyed by J.

Alpha surfaces in Chinatown, where he tries to poison New York City's water, only to be thwarted by K. Alpha escapes after telling K that he intends to wipe out humanity and rule Earth in peace. After the incident with Alpha, J is assigned to gather evidence against the Godfather, but is spotted and forced into a fight with the Godfather, who he incapacitates using a new weapon that was being tested by the Godfather.

While K is out meeting with the alien pawn broker Jack Jeebs, the Fmeks make themselves human-sized and take over the MIB. K defeats the Fmeks, rescues all of their hostages, and disables the self-destruct mechanism that the Fmeks were going to use to destroy MIB HQ. The ordeal leaves K too battered to assist J with their next assignment, which is to protect the President of the United States from Alpha and the Godfather. The two villains try to assassinate the President, first by attempting to bomb the building that she is staying in, and then by sending an army of henchmen after her, but the bombs are diffused and the minions defeated by J. J subdues the Godfather, and then fights and defeats Alpha. When the President reveals the existence of the MIB to the world in a televised address, J and K alter her memories and the memories of everyone viewing the broadcast with their Neuralyzers.

The game ends with J being congratulated for his efforts by his fellow agents and being given a coffee cake by the Worms. The celebration is cut short by an alarm signifying that an unknown alien vessel is approaching the Earth.

== Development and release ==
In May 2001, Infogrames revealed at E3 that it had obtained authorization to create a first-person shooter video game based on Men in Black: The Series, to be developed by Runecraft with a planned release for the PlayStation at the end of the year. Men in Black – The Series: Crashdown was released in the United States on November 20, 2001.

== Reception ==
Reception

Aggregate score
Aggregator	Score
Metacritic	59/100

Review scores
Publication	Score
Computer and Video Games	6/10
GameZone	6.5/10
Gamezilla	80/100

On Metacritic, the game has a score of 59/100, indicating "mixed or average reviews".

Computer and Video Games wrote that "for a bit of mindless mission-solving and alien-blasting this is worth a look," stating that, "Controls are easy, so getting stuck in isn't a problem. Good fun if a little lightweight for hardened blast freaks." Suzi Sez of GameZone considered the game and its graphics "slightly above average", but wrote, "The voice characterizations were fairly decent and the overall music was better than average." Sez stated, "I wasn't overly impressed with this particular game. It lacks pizzazz and punch and it plays more like a hack 'n slash type game".

Tina Bradley of Gamezilla praised the game's "amusing" cutscenes and its sound effects, and called it one of the few Men in Black video games to successfully capture "some of the quirky humor and neat gadgets from the movie." However, Bradley criticized the game for "stealing a lot of elements from the Alien movies/game, from the enemy designs to the radar detector." Bradley considered the gameplay exceptional but "not groundbreaking by any means". Bradley noted that the graphics were "decent, but not spectacular", stating that they "have a cartoony look to them that fits with the television series". Bradley concluded, "This game is not the best shooter out there, but it is solid. It makes good use of the MIB license, and fans of the movie and cartoon should enjoy this game if they like first-person shooters at all."
