= Men in Black 2: The Series =

2000 video game

- Developer: David A. Palmer Productions
- Publisher: Crave Entertainment
- Designer: David Garrison
- Programmer: Matthew Hopwood
- Artist: Dave Garrison
- Series: Men in Black
- Platform: Game Boy Color
- Release: June 2000
- Genres: Action, platform
- Mode: Single-player

Men in Black 2: The Series is an action video game developed by David A. Palmer Productions and published by Crave Entertainment for the Game Boy Color. It is based on the animated television series, Men in Black: The Series, and is a sequel to the 1999 video game of the same name. Crave Entertainment announced the game in March 2000, and released it in the United States in July 2000.

== Gameplay ==
Men in Black 2: The Series is a side-scrolling platform action game. The player chooses to play as either Agent J or Agent K, and must defeat aliens and cloned agents throughout eight levels set in New York City. Both characters play the same and are different only in skin color. The player can use various weapons, including the Noisy Cricket.

The player's objective in each level is to collect four pairs of Men in Black sunglasses. Five boss enemies are featured in the game. The game offers a cooperative mode in which up to seven other people can take turns playing the game using a single Game Boy Color console. During the cooperative mode, the player is given a total of 40 lives. A four-digit password is given to the player after each level is finished.

== Reception ==
Reception

Aggregate score
Aggregator	Score
GameRankings	49%

Review scores
Publication	Score
AllGame	3/5
CNET Gamecenter	4/10
GameSpot	5.3/10
IGN	5/10
Total Game Boy	42%

Tim Tracey of GameSpot praised the character animations but criticized the game's slow moving camera, and wrote, "While the game may have several glaring flaws, it ends up being a tolerable Game Boy Color title." Tracey noted that while "many experienced gamers" may find the game to be too easy, "this title is aptly suited for a younger audience, who will probably find the franchise more interesting anyway."

Marc Nix of IGN criticized the characters for their lack of unique abilities, and wrote, "Collecting four pairs of sunglasses on each level, such as is the driving force in Men In Black 2, isn't enough reason for me to even get out of bed." U.K. magazine Total Game Boy criticized the graphics, the repetitive gameplay, and the difficulty. Scott Steinberg of Gamecenter also found it difficult, and considered it an average platform game.

Nick Woods of AllGame called the sequel "one of the better side-scrolling action games on the Game Boy Color," and praised the character animations. However, Woods opined that the game was "much harder than it should be," and that, "It would have been nice if the characters had unique special moves; this would have distinguished them from one another. While the characters are somewhat disappointing, the gameplay is very entertaining."

Los Angeles Times said "There's so little to "Men in Black 2" that it's best just left alone".
