= Men in Black II: Alien Escape =

2002 video game

- Developer(s): Infogrames Melbourne House (Note: Ported to GameCube by Tantalus.)
- Publisher(s): Infogrames
- Platform(s): PlayStation 2, GameCube
- Release: PlayStation 2: NA: June 28, 2002; EU/AU: July 19, 2002; GameCube: EU: February 7, 2003; NA: April 8, 2003
- Genre(s): Action-adventure
- Mode(s): Single-player, multiplayer

Men in Black II: Alien Escape is an action-adventure video game developed by Infogrames Melbourne House and published by Infogrames in 2002 for the PlayStation 2, and was later ported to the GameCube in 2003 by Tantalus. The game is partially based on the Men in Black II movie.

== Plot ==
In Men in Black II: Alien Escape, players take on the role of one of the MIB agents Agent K or Agent J, and are required to stop aliens from blowing up the Earth with a ship based weapon called the Class 7 Ozone Demogrifier. They investigate aliens living on Earth in events similar to the film.

== Reception ==
Reception

Aggregate scores
Aggregator	Score	
Aggregator	GC	PS2
GameRankings	54%	53%
Metacritic	N/A	50/100

Review scores
Publication	Score	
Publication	GC	PS2
Game Informer	N/A	7.5/10
GamePro	N/A	2/5
GameRevolution	N/A	D
GameSpot	6.9/10	7.2/10
GameSpy	N/A	69/100
IGN	N/A	4/10
The Electric Playground	N/A	6/10

On Metacritic, the PlayStation 2 version of Men in Black II: Alien Escape has a score of 50 out of 100, indicating "mixed or average reviews". On GameRankings, the GameCube version has a rating of 54%.
