= Men in Black: The Series =

American animated television series

- Official series logo
- Genre: Action-adventure; Science fiction comedy
- Based on: The Men in Black by Lowell Cunningham Men in Black by Ed Solomon
- Developed by: Duane Capizzi; Jeff Kline; Richard Raynis
- Voices of: Ed O'Ross; Gregg Berger; Keith Diamond; Jennifer Lien; Jennifer Martin; Charles Napier; Vincent D'Onofrio; David Warner
- Theme music composer: Jim Latham
- Composer: Jim Latham
- Country of origin: United States
- Original language: English
- No. of seasons: 4
- No. of episodes: 53 (list of episodes)

Production
- Executive producers: Richard Raynis; Jeff Kline; Laurie MacDonald; Walter F. Parkes
- Producers: Duane Capizzi; Frank Paur; Rafael Rosado; Jane Wu; Michael Goguen; Dean Stefan
- Running time: 22–24 minutes
- Production companies: Adelaide Productions; Amblin Entertainment; Columbia TriStar Television

Original release
- Network: Kids' WB
- Release: October 11, 1997 – June 30, 2001

Related
- Men in Black

Men in Black: The Series is an American animated television series that originally aired on Kids' WB from October 11, 1997, to June 30, 2001. The show features characters from the science fiction film Men in Black, which was based on the comic book series The Men in Black created by Lowell Cunningham.

Originally published by Marvel / Malibu Comics. The series was produced by Adelaide Productions, a division of Columbia TriStar Television, and Amblin Entertainment as a half-hour series originally airing on Saturday mornings, and later moving to weekdays during its final run.

== Plot ==
The show is set after the first Men in Black film in an alternate timeline. The most significant differences in the series are that Agent K did not retire, and Agent J is still regarded as a rookie. Agent L, on the other hand, is depicted as a senior staff of the organization, a radical change from the first film. Some episodes do incorporate aspects of the film franchise. While the series offers internal continuity and extended plot arcs, it is primarily presented in standalone episodes. Some recurring themes include the exploration of K's origins, as well as J encountering individuals from his life prior to joining MIB. Unlike the film series, the MIB headquarters is located at what looks like a disused area under LaGuardia Airport instead of 504 Battery Drive in New York City.

== Episodes ==
Season	Episodes	Originally released	
Season	Episodes	First released	Last released
1	13	October 11, 1997	May 16, 1998
2	13	September 19, 1998	February 6, 1999
3	14	October 2, 1999	May 20, 2000
4	13	September 16, 2000	June 30, 2001

== Characters ==
=== Main characters ===
- Agent J (voiced by Keith Diamond) – Agent J (James Edwards) is one of the main agents of the organization. He is energetic, and tries to bring emotion back to the bland organization. At one point, J arrests the alien Jarra for attempting to steal the Earth's ozone layer and sell it on the Black Market. He remains somewhat of a sidekick to Agent K. He is referred as "Slick" by K. Throughout the series, most of the other agents treat J as a screw-up who should not have been allowed in the MIB.
- Agent K (voiced by Ed O'Ross in Season 1, Gregg Berger in Seasons 2–4) – Agent K (Kevin Brown) is a top agent and a founder of the organization; and after working at the organisation for nearly 40 years, he shows nearly no emotion. He and J must constantly fight off his old partner Alpha.
- Agent L (voiced by Jennifer Lien in Seasons 1–3, Jennifer Martin in Season 4) – Agent L (Laurel Weaver) is a morgue worker who joins the MIB after she helps Agent K and J stop Edgar the Bug from stealing The Galaxy. She stays in the medical section of the organization until Season 4, wherein she becomes a field agent with Agent X as her partner.
- Chief Zed (voiced by Charles Napier) – The head of the organization and K and J's boss. He is usually shown in his office, high above the main floor of the headquarters. Zed took the job of director at some point prior to the incident with Serlena and the Light of Zartha in 1978.

=== Supporting ===
- Frank the Pug (voiced by Eddie Barth) – Frank the Pug is an extraterrestrial living in New York City, in the guise of a pug. It is later revealed that the "human" at Frank's newspaper stand is a robot, and that Frank's true form resembles a pug, albeit with a dark green color, antennas, and a three-pointed tail.
- The Worm Guys (voiced by Patrick Pinney and Pat Fraley) – The Worm Guys are four insect-like aliens who love to drink coffee and relax in the organization's break room, all of their names are Neeble, Geeble, Sleeble and Mannix. They are renowned for knowing many figures of speech and the organization rulebook.
- Jack Jeebs (voiced by Tony Shalhoub in Season 1, Billy West in Seasons 2–4) – Jack Jeebs is a humanoid alien who runs a pawn shop, carrying both alien and human merchandise. Jeebs' head is frequently blasted off, but he possesses regenerative abilities that let him grow his head back within seconds, much to his annoyance.
- Idikiukup and Bob (voiced by Patrick Pinney and Pat Fraley) – A pair of alien twins (earning them the nickname of the Twins) that serve as the MIB's head scientists along with Agent L. They mostly stay at headquarters, though Bob pilots a helicopter in "It's a Fmall Fmall World".
- Dr. Zan'dozz Zeeltor (voiced by Steve Kehela) – A blue-skinned humanoid alien who replaces Elle as chief scientific officer of the organization. He is very eccentric about the simple items around Earth. Most of his inventions usually cause more harm around J, such as a sticky note pad that started to constrict him. Zeeltor has a pet named Lucy: a Futavian bacteria colony.
- Agent X (voiced by Adam Baldwin) – A big-eared, green-skinned alien from the G-Dan galaxy; recruited into the organization as Elle's partner, to smooth over human-alien relations. Though he has an impeccable record, X was suspended six times in his home galaxy.
- Agent D (voiced by John Mariano) – Agent D (Derrick Cunningham) is Agent K's former partner who is now retired after getting too old in the fight against the evil aliens. He was a founding member of the organization. Derrick is seen enjoying his retirement with his wife, before he is wiped out of existence by a time traveling alien-hating bigot. Agent D was restored by K and a Cerebro-enhanced Agent J.
- Agent H (voiced by Kurtwood Smith) – One of the founding members of the Men in Black. He was responsible for designing most of the organization's medical equipment.
- Agent Q – One of the founding members of the organization; responsible for the weapons and vehicles that the organization use.
- Aileen (voiced by Beth Broderick) – A female alien and agent of the Men in Black: a blue-skinned humanoid with extendable, tentacle-like fingers. She lost her former partner to an alien shapeshifter called an Inanimate. She is later assigned another partner named Eidi, whom she treats similarly to K's treatment of J. Like K, she is a legendary agent on her home planet.
- Eidi – Aileen's rookie partner who belongs to the same species as her and was assigned to work with her after the capture of the Inanimate. Eidi and J bond while working the case due to their shared status as novices partnered with the planet's best agents.
- Agent U – An average agent. His name before joining the organization was Upton, which J easily deduces. There is a running gag where U's agent codename and the word "you" are often confused. U is shown to be a major suck up and simply teaches alien children how to disguise themselves as humans.
- Agent E – An agent who works in Hollywood, getting work for aliens in movies and television shows.
- Troy The Symbiote (voiced by Rino Romano) – A young adventurous symbiote who has a playful relationship with J. His dream is to work for the organization, much to his mother's distress. Troy becomes an MIB intern in "The Heads You Lose Syndrome".
- Klah'Mikk – A paperwork-filing alien who works for the organisation.
- The Fmeks – The warmongering counterparts of the Arquillians. The Fmeks are the Arquillians' sworn enemy because the Arquillians' planet is bigger than their home world Fmoo.

=== Villains ===
- Alpha (voiced by David Warner) – Alpha is Agent K's former mentor, and now the sworn enemy of him and the MIB as well as the main antagonist of the series. Stealing a Verulian Cosmic Integrator, he used it to graft stolen alien body parts onto himself until he was defeated and captured. Escaping and allying himself with Vangus and the Ixions, Alpha turned himself into a cyborg. Alpha is killed in the series finale, "The Endgame Syndrome".
- Treblor / Buzzard (voiced by Sherman Howard) – A Zombarian bounty hunter who is an occasional adversary of Agents J and K.
- Drekk (voiced by Ron Perlman) – Drekk is alien who has a long criminal record: "longer than Van Allen's belt", according to Chief Zed. He is a former cell-mate of Frank the Pug, and an antagonist of the lead characters.
- The Bugs - A race of parasitic insecoids that resemble a mantis.
  - The Emperor Worm (voiced by Vincent D'Onofrio) – The Emperor Worm is the leader of the Worms. Unlike the other Worms, the Emperor is hugely fat, and almost double the height of the others. It is also revealed that only royalty are allowed to drink coffee on their home planet, resulting in the Worms to avoid drinking any of it under his presence. He usually shows up un-announced at the organisation. The Emperor is careless and defenseless, so the other Worms must watch him.
  - The Bug Queen (voiced by Mary Kay Bergman) – The queen of Edgar and Edwin's planet and mother of all bugs that resembles a praying mantis. The Bug Queen puts a bounty on Agent L's head, offering her royal jelly to any Bug that brings her Elle. She later attempted to colonize Manhattan with a new generation of offspring but was foiled by the MIB. The Bug Queen subsequently attempted to conquer Earth once more but was foiled by Agent K and Agent J who flooded the tunnel which the Bugs were using as a base. She was ultimately vanquished by K and a temporarily amnesiac J.
  - Edgar the Bug – A cockroach-like alien and the main antagonist of the feature film who was killed by Agent L. His only appearance in the series was in a flashback to his death in "The Big Bad Bug Syndrome". Edgar is revealed to have a twin brother named Edwin as well as being the Bug Queen's favorite. His death causes The Queen to put a bounty on L's head.
  - Edwin the Bug (voiced by Vincent D'Onofrio) – The twin brother of Edgar who was sent by the Bug Queen (along with his siblings Dung the dung beetle and Moe the mosquito) to capture Agent L for killing Edgar and deliver her to the queen in exchange for her royal jelly as an award. He was defeated by the Worms who tricked his siblings to use De-Atomizers to kill him.
  - Geen (voiced by Vincent D'Onofrio) – A voracious Bug who was imprisoned in M.I.B intergalactic prison. Geen and several other inmates were temporarily released by Doctor Lupo and proceeded to wreak havoc upon the MIB HQ until they were rounded up by K and J.
- Dak Jeebs (voiced by Billy West) – Jack Jeebs' criminal older brother who often picks on him and calling him squirt, especially blowing up his head just to frustrate him. Unlike his brother, he actually enjoys the sensation when getting dismembered.
- The Ixions – A race of oil-loving creatures who attempt to plunder the Earth's oil to sell it on the intergalactic market. They were ultimately defeated by MIB along with Alpha.
  - Vangus (voiced by Billy West) – The leader of the Ixions.

=== Alien races ===
- Arquillians – The Arquillians are a race of tiny humanoid aliens. Arquillians have large heads and eyes, but a small body, and hide in human-like robots. The Arquillians own the Arquillian Galaxy, a miniaturized source of sub-atomic power, and will not stand for it being lost or stolen. They are ruled by a complex monarchy.
- Baltians – A tall, slender species that vaguely resemble Grey aliens and were the first species encountered by the original Men in Black. The Baltians return to Earth every ten years to provide new alien technologies to help fund the organization.

=== Characters design ===
The aesthetics of the characters were designed by comic book artist Miguelanxo Prado.

== Home media ==
=== United States ===
In the United States, six episodes from the first half of the first season were issued on three two-episode VHS volumes, all made available on March 16, 1999.

On May 11, 2012, the entire first season was released on DVD for the first time in the United States, being made available as an exclusive product for Target stores in the country. Thus far, no plans have been announced to issue any further seasons of the show on DVD.

=== International ===
In the United Kingdom, the first season was released by Columbia TriStar Home Video on two bumper-edition VHS tapes in 1998 and 1999, alongside a tape containing the first two episodes of the season. The first volume contained the first seven episodes with the first episode included as a bonus "Pilot" episode. The second volume contained the other six episodes. They were reissued by Cinema Club in 2000, and UCA in 2002 and 2003.

On July 12, 2004, UCA released a single-disc DVD containing the first three episodes of the first season. Further releases were planned, but sales were not strong enough to warrant any other DVD releases from UCA.

Sony Pictures Home Entertainment released the complete first season on DVD in Australia on July 4, 2007. The set contained two discs, one containing seven episodes and the other containing the remaining six. On July 16, 2007, the set was made available in the United Kingdom but was split up into two separate volumes instead of a whole box set.

=== Streaming ===
Sony Pictures has uploaded episodes of the series on their Throwback Toons and Indoor Recess YouTube channels, alongside YouTube channels operated by the company's Indian branch.

It was formerly available for streaming online in Canada via CTV Television Network's streaming service CTV Throwback.

The series was available on the streaming service Tubi that added on March 25, 2025, but was removed on March 24, 2026, along with Jackie Chan Adventures, but eventually moved to Tubi's competitor The Roku Channel.

== Awards ==
Daytime Emmy Awards

- 2002 – Outstanding Sound Editing – Special Class – Roshaun Hawley, Paca Thomas, Dan Cubert and Marc S. Perlman (won)

== Video games ==
A video game based on the series, titled Men in Black: The Series, was released for the Game Boy Color in 1999, and later ported to the Game Boy Advance in 2001. A sequel, titled Men in Black 2: The Series and also based on the show, was released for the Game Boy Color in 2000. Another game based on the series, titled Men in Black: The Series – Crashdown, was released for the PlayStation in 2001.
