= The Men in Black (comics) =

Comic book

- The Men in Black #1 (Jan. 1990), cover art by Max S. Fellwalker.

Publication information
- Publisher: Marvel Comics
- Schedule: Monthly
- Format: Mini-series; One-shots
- Genre: Science fiction
- Publication date: Jan.–March 1990; May–July 1991
- No. of issues: 6

Creative team
- Created by: Lowell Cunningham
- Written by: Lowell Cunningham
- Artist: Sandy Carruthers

Collected editions
- The Men in Black: ISBN 0944735606

The Men in Black is an American science fiction comic book series based on the "men in black" conspiracy theory. It was created and written by Lowell Cunningham, illustrated by Sandy Carruthers, and originally published by Malibu Comics under its Aircel Comics imprint. Malibu was later acquired by Marvel Comics. Three issues of The Men in Black were published in 1990, with another three the following year. The comics spawned a media franchise which includes a series of four films, an animated television series, video games, and a theme park attraction, as well as several one-shot comics from Marvel.

== Publication history ==
The original three-issue series of The Men in Black was published in 1990 by Aircel Comics. After acquiring Aircel, Malibu Comics released a second three-issue series, The Men in Black Book II, in 1991.

Malibu was purchased by Marvel Comics in 1994, and when the feature film Men in Black was released, Marvel published a number of one-shots in 1997, a sequel to the original comic book line, a sequel to the film, a movie adaptation, and a reprint of the first issue of the original Aircel miniseries.

The first series was collected into a trade paperback (June 1990, ISBN 0944735606).

== Plot ==
The Men in Black is an international agency which oversees and investigates both good and evil paranormal activity on Earth, including alien life, demons, mutants, zombies, werewolves, vampires, legendary creatures and other paranormal beings. To keep their investigations secret, much of the global population is unaware of their activities and is liable to be neuralyzed to erase any memory of interaction with the agents or related phenomena.

Notable members include Zed, Jay, Kay, and Ecks. Ecks later becomes a rogue agent after learning that the MIB seeks to keep the supernatural hidden to manipulate and reshape the world in their own image.

An agent may use any means necessary, including death and destruction, to accomplish a mission. Agents sever all ties with their former lives, and (thanks to the neuralyzer) as far as the world is concerned, they do not exist.

== Adaptations ==
Beginning with the release of the film Men in Black in 1997, the comic book has been adapted across a wide variety of media, spawning an entire franchise. Starring Will Smith and Tommy Lee Jones, the film proved a huge box office success for Columbia Pictures and Amblin Entertainment, resulting in two sequels: Men in Black II and Men in Black 3. The popularity of the films subsequently led to many tie-ins and spin-offs, including an animated series, novelizations, soundtracks of each film, video games, and a theme park attraction. A spin-off was released in 2019, titled Men in Black: International. It continues the universe of the first three films, instead of adapting the original material from the comic book.

Despite sharing the same basic premise, the various adaptations differ greatly from the original comics. Some of these differences include:

- The secret organization exclusively polices extraterrestrial activity on Earth, omitting the other paranormal elements.
- The agency's main goal is to maintain order on Earth, rather than to direct it.
- Zed physically appears, rather than being an unseen character.
- Ecks is absent in the film, and is replaced by Dr. Laurel Weaver (later Agent L).
- Agent Jay is an African-American man, instead of a blonde-haired white man.
- The tone of the series was lightened, exchanging the comics' dark and bleak approach for comedy.
