= Men in Black 3 =

2012 film by Barry Sonnenfeld

- Theatrical release poster
- Directed by: Barry Sonnenfeld
- Written by: Etan Cohen
- Based on: The Men in Black by Lowell Cunningham
- Produced by: Walter F. Parkes; Laurie MacDonald
- Starring: Will Smith; Tommy Lee Jones; Josh Brolin; Jemaine Clement; Michael Stuhlbarg; Emma Thompson
- Cinematography: Bill Pope
- Edited by: Don Zimmerman
- Music by: Danny Elfman
- Production companies: Columbia Pictures; Hemisphere Media Capital; Amblin Entertainment; Parkes+MacDonald Image Nation
- Distributed by: Sony Pictures Releasing
- Release dates: May 14, 2012 (Berlin); May 25, 2012 (United States)
- Running time: 106 minutes
- Country: United States
- Language: English
- Budget: $215–250 million
- Box office: $654.2 million

Men in Black 3 (stylized as MIB³ in promotional material) is a 2012 American science fiction action comedy film based on The Men in Black comic book series. It is the third installment in the Men in Black film series, a sequel to Men in Black II (2002), and the final installment of the original trilogy. Directed by Barry Sonnenfeld and written by Etan Cohen, the film stars Will Smith, Tommy Lee Jones and Josh Brolin, with Jemaine Clement, Michael Stuhlbarg, and Emma Thompson in supporting roles. In the film, Agent J is required to go back in time to prevent the assassination of his partner Agent K, the fallout of which threatens the safety of Earth.

Development of the sequel began during filming of its predecessor, with its premise suggested by Smith to Sonnenfeld. Despite rumors of a fallout between Smith and Sonnenfeld during the filming of Men in Black II, their returns were confirmed alongside Jones by May 2010. David Koepp and Jeff Nathanson were later hired to perform uncredited rewrites to Cohen's original screenplay and principal photography began that November. Filming was split into two parts, first occurring between November and December 2010, and restarting between April and June 2011, taking place primarily in New York City. Composer Danny Elfman, who scored the previous two installments, returned to score the third. With a production budget of $215 million, it is one of the most expensive films ever made.

Men in Black 3 premiered at O2 World in Berlin on May 14, 2012, and was theatrically released in the United States on May 25. It received generally positive reviews from critics, with praise for the performances of the cast (particularly Brolin's), and was considered an improvement over its predecessor. The film grossed $654.2 million worldwide, becoming the tenth-highest grossing film of 2012 and the highest grossing film in the franchise, unadjusted for inflation. A standalone sequel, Men in Black: International, was released in 2019, without most of the original cast.

== Plot ==
In 2012, alien criminal Boris the Animal escapes from a maximum-security prison on the Moon to take revenge on Men in Black (MIB) Agent K, who shot off his arm and arrested him in 1969. He eventually confronts K and his partner Agent J, telling the former that he is "already dead" before leaving. J and K fall out over the latter's efforts to stop him from pursuing Boris and refusing to explain what happened. At MIB headquarters, J's superior, Agent O, denies his request for further information on Boris' apprehension; only revealing that around the same time, K also deployed the ArcNet, an interplanetary shield that prevented the now-extinct Boglodites from invading Earth.

Boris obtains a time machine from Jeffrey Price, the son of a fellow prisoner named Obadiah Price, and travels back in time to July 16, 1969, to kill K, altering history. Though J retains his memories, he briefly suffers from strange side effects, which O identifies as signs that the space-time continuum was fractured before Earth is threatened by a Boglodite invasion. Recalling Boris will commit murder on July 15, 1969, J seeks out Jeffrey, obtains his own time machine, and travels back in time to stop Boris. However, he is arrested by a young K, who almost neuralyzes him until J convinces him of his mission. Following a series of clues, the pair reach the Factory, where undercover MIB agent Andy Warhol directs them to an Archanan named Griffin, who can view all possible outcomes and escaped to Earth after the Boglodites destroyed his planet. Sensing the younger Boris' impending attack, Griffin flees, but alludes to his future location. K and J later find Griffin at Shea Stadium and rescue him from the younger Boris.

As the present-day Boris arrives in the past and convinces his younger self to join forces with him, Griffin gives the ArcNet to K and J. After deducing the device must be attached to the Apollo 11 rocket to send it into Earth's orbit, J reluctantly reveals K's impending death. With Griffin revealing that only K can successfully attach the device, K encourages J to take the risk. The trio use jetpacks to reach Cape Canaveral, where Griffin advises the pair to tell the truth to the military police instead of neuralyzing them. They are apprehended by the colonel, but Griffin shows him the importance of their mission. The colonel subsequently assists them in reaching the rocket while Griffin leaves, assuring J that history will be restored once K takes Boris' arm. The Borises attack the agents, but they defeat them before K attaches the ArcNet. Present-day Boris falls into the launchpad's flame trench and is incinerated by the rocket's exhaust while the ArcNet is successfully deployed.

K reunites with the colonel, but the latter sacrifices himself to save him from the younger Boris, who goads K into arresting him. K refuses, killing him instead and breaking the loop. K soon learns the colonel's son, James, was nearby and reluctantly neuralyzes him. Witnessing the events from afar, J realizes the colonel was his father and his younger self's presence kept him from forgetting K. Returning to a restored 2012, J reconciles with K while un-aged Griffin tells the viewers "this is [his] new favorite moment in human history."

== Cast ==
- Will Smith and Cayen Martin as James Darrell Edwards III / Agent J: An MIB agent and longtime friend and partner of K. Smith portrays J in the present and Martin portrays J as a child in 1969.
- Tommy Lee Jones and Josh Brolin as Kevin Brown / Agent K: A veteran MIB agent and J's longtime partner. Jones portrays K in the present and Brolin portrays K in 1969.
- Jemaine Clement as Boris the Animal: A ruthless alien with a vendetta against K, hates being called "the animal" and insists that "it's just Boris."
- Emma Thompson and Alice Eve as Agent O: The head of MIB, succeeding Zed. Thompson portrays O in the present and Eve portrays O in 1969.
- Michael Stuhlbarg as Griffin: An alien with clairvoyant abilities.
- Mike Colter as Colonel James Darrell Edwards, Jr.: A U.S. Army military officer and Agent J's father.
- Nicole Scherzinger as Lilly Poison: Boris' girlfriend.
- Michael Chernus as Jeffrey Price: An electronics store clerk in possession of time travel technology and Obadiah Price's son.
- David Rasche as Agent X: The head of MIB in 1969.
- Keone Young as Mr. Wu: An alien who owns a Chinese restaurant.
- Bill Hader as Andy Warhol / Agent W: An artist who is secretly an MIB agent.
- Lenny Venito as Bowling Ball Head: An unnamed alien with a detachable head who works at a bowling alley.
- David Pittu as Roman the Fabulist: An alien posing as a fortune teller.
- Lanny Flaherty as Obadiah Price: The inventor of the time travel technology and Jeffrey's father.

Justin Bieber, Lady Gaga, Yao Ming, and Tim Burton make uncredited cameo appearances as aliens on the television monitors. Will Arnett plays Agent J's new partner Agent AA in an uncredited role. Make-up artist Rick Baker has a cameo as the Brain Alien. Chloe Sonnenfeld, the daughter of director Barry Sonnenfeld, plays the flower child who encounters Boris at the carnival. Jared Johnston, Ken Arnold, and Jonathan Drew portray Neil Armstrong, Buzz Aldrin, and Michael Collins, respectively.

== Production ==
The film's premise was first proposed to director Barry Sonnenfeld by Will Smith during the filming of Men in Black II in 2002, with Smith suggesting that his character Agent J travel back in time to save his partner Agent K while at the same time exploring Agent K's backstory. Sonnenfeld said the idea "turned out to be a very long process of development, mainly because of the knotting [sic] issues of time travel". It was reported that Smith and executives were leery about bringing back Sonnenfeld because of conflicts on the set of Men in Black II. In a lawsuit filed against his former agents over commissions, Sonnenfeld alleged that Sony considered other directors for Men in Black 3. Sonnenfeld ultimately convinced all involved that he had a strong vision for the film.

The film was first announced on April 1, 2009, by Sony Pictures Entertainment president Rory Bruer during a Sony ShoWest presentation. By October 2009, Etan Cohen had been hired to write the screenplay. Sonnenfeld read the script and started working on it in January 2010. As of March 2010, Will Smith remained undecided whether to join the film or another, The City That Sailed. Sonnenfeld in May 2010 confirmed the return of Tommy Lee Jones and Smith. Both had expressed interest in 2008 in reprising their roles. The filmmakers also included Walter F. Parkes and Laurie MacDonald as producers, with Steven Spielberg as executive producer; all were producers of the two previous films. Sonnenfeld considered Mark Wahlberg for the role of younger Agent K, before casting Josh Brolin.

In June 2010, writer David Koepp was hired to rewrite the Cohen script. A third writer, Jeff Nathanson, was hired in November 2010 to rewrite the segment of the script that takes place in 1969. Nathanson and Koepp, along with producer Spielberg, had previously worked together on the 2008 film Indiana Jones and the Kingdom of the Crystal Skull, which Spielberg directed.

Special effects artist Rick Baker created the practical aliens and prosthetic makeup for the film, reprising his role from the previous two Men in Black films. In designing the look for the alien creatures, Baker used the time travel plot device as a reason to design "retro" looking aliens reminiscent of science fiction B movies of the era, saying, "In 2012 the aliens should look like Men in Black aliens and in 1969 they should be retro aliens. Fishbowl space helmets, guys with space suits with ribbed things on it, exposed brains, [and] bug eyes."

Principal photography began on November 16, 2010, even though, "We knew starting the movie that we didn't have a finished second or third act," director Sonnenfeld said in 2012. "Was it responsible? The answer is, if this movie does as well as I think it will, it was genius. If it's a total failure, then it was a really stupid idea." Filming was originally slated to commence on October 18, 2010, and continue until May 2011, in New York City, with shooting starting in 2010 partly in order to take advantage of a New York tax break in which the state rebates 30 percent of production costs incurred there. Filming was ultimately split into two parts, the first taking place from November until about Christmas 2010; the filmmakers announced shooting would begin again in mid-February, but it was delayed until April. Sonnenfeld initially stated he would be shooting in 3D, but later decided to film in 2D and convert to 3D during post-production.

Set photos for the film appeared online on November 17, 2010, showing Smith, Jones, Emma Thompson, and Nicole Scherzinger. Filming was done in April 2011 in the Morris Park section of The Bronx. Parts of Coney Island, in Brooklyn, had parking and filming permits posted for April 24 and May 2–4, 2011, production dates for what the permits titled MIB^{3}. Shooting also took place in Manhattan's SoHo neighborhood, and was scheduled to wrap in June.

For the film, the Ford Taurus SHO was selected as the MIB's official car, replacing the Ford LTD Crown Victoria and Mercedes-Benz E-Class from the first two films. For the 1969 scenes, a 1964 Ford Galaxie was used as the MIB's official car.

== Release ==
=== Video game ===
Activision released MIB: Alien Crisis on May 22, 2012, for Xbox 360, PlayStation 3, and Wii, featuring a never-before-seen MIB agent rather than Agent J or Agent K. Gameloft also developed a mobile phone video game based on the film, released on May 17, 2012, for iOS and Android.

=== Theatrical ===
Under distribution by Sony's Columbia Pictures division, the film was theatrically released on May 25, 2012.

=== Home media ===
The film was released on DVD, Blu-ray, and Blu-ray 3D on November 30, 2012, and additionally as part of a Men in Black trilogy box set on Blu-ray. The trilogy was released on 4K UHD Blu-ray on December 5, 2017.

== Music ==
The soundtrack for the film was composed by Danny Elfman and was released on May 29, 2012, four days after the film.

The song "Back in Time" by rapper Pitbull, which was not included on the film's soundtrack album but accompanies the end credits of the film, was released as a single on March 26, 2012. It is the first lead single released to accompany a Men in Black film not to be performed by Will Smith.

There were also many songs from the 1960s that feature, including "2000 Light Years from Home" by the Rolling Stones, "I'm Waiting for the Man" by the Velvet Underground, “I'm an old cowhand (from the rio grande)” by Roy Rogers and the sons of the pioneers, "Strange Brew" by Cream, and "Pictures of Matchstick Men" by Status Quo.

== Reception ==
=== Box office ===
MIB 3 grossed $179 million in the US and Canada, and $475.2 million in other countries, for a worldwide total of $654.2 million. It had a worldwide opening weekend of $189.9 million, and had the biggest worldwide IMAX Memorial-Day weekend ($12.7 million from 474 theaters), surpassing the previous year's record of Pirates of the Caribbean: On Stranger Tides.

In North America, MIB 3 earned $1.55 million during its midnight run from 2,233 locations. On its opening day, the film debuted at the top of the box office, grossing $17.7 million (including midnight grosses). This was slightly lower than the opening days of its predecessors. During its three-day opening weekend, it topped the box office with $54.6 million, which was higher than the opening weekends of the two previous films. The movie then earned an additional $14.7 million on Memorial Day, bringing its four-day weekend total to $69.3 million. The opening weekend audience was 54 percent male and 56 percent over the age of 25. The film received a B+ at CinemaScore. It remained in first place at the North American box office for one week.

Outside North America, MIB 3 is the highest-grossing film of the Men in Black franchise and the tenth highest-grossing 2012 film. It made $135.3 million on its opening weekend from 85 territories. Its highest-grossing openings were recorded in China ($21.7 million), and Russia and the CIS ($16.9 million). It was in first place at the box office outside North America for two consecutive weekends.

=== Critical response ===
On Rotten Tomatoes, Men in Black 3 holds an approval rating of 67% based on 250 reviews, with an average rating of 6/10. The site's critical consensus reads, "It isn't exactly a persuasive argument for the continuation of the franchise–but Men in Black III is better than its predecessor and manages to exceed expectations." On Metacritic, the film has a weighted average score of 58 out of 100, based on 38 critics, indicating "mixed or average reviews". Audiences polled by CinemaScore gave the film an average grade of "B+" on an A+ to F scale, the same score earned by the first two films.

Roger Ebert gave the film 3 out of 4 stars, in particular praising Brolin's role as the young Agent K, which he cited as an excellent example of good casting. Ebert also praised the "ingenious plot, bizarre monsters, audacious cliff-hanging" and the "virtuoso final sequence." Richard Roeper gave the film 3.5 out of 5 stars while saying, "It's that rare threequel that doesn't suck. Great special effects, surprising amount of heart." A. O. Scott of The New York Times also gave it 3.5 out of 5 stars and commented, "Men in Black 3 arrives in the multiplexes of the world with no particular agenda. Which may be part of the reason that it turns out to be so much fun." Lisa Schwarzbaum of Entertainment Weekly noted, "Sonnenfeld and Cohen move their baby along with an integrity and gait that ought to serve as a blueprint for other filmmakers faced with the particular challenges of reviving big-ticket and time-dated hunks of pop culture." Rafer Guzman of Newsday wrote, "the franchise is no longer the zenith of blockbusterism, and the gooey effects from Hollywood veteran Rick Baker look overly familiar, but Men in Black 3 remains an amiable comedy with some fondly familiar faces."

Director Paul Thomas Anderson praised the film, saying, "It was [expletive] great. [sic] ... The time-travel stuff [made me] cry my eyes out. I'm a sucker for that stuff."

Rene Rodriguez of The Miami Herald gave the film 1 out of 4 stars and stated, "Men in Black 3 is so dull and empty, it's the first movie that has ever made me think 'Thank God this is in 3D.'"

== Sequel ==
Before its production with different leads, both Will Smith and Tommy Lee Jones said that they would "consider" appearing in a fourth film. Jones said it would be "easy to pick up where we left off. We know what we are doing, we know how to do it. It's just a hell of a lot of fun."

In July 2012, Columbia chief executive Doug Belgrad said:

We're very pleased with the financial performance of Men in Black 3, and we believe it is an ongoing franchise. We're going to do [another one], but we don't have clarity yet on how it should be done.

By early 2013, Oren Uziel had begun writing a Men in Black 4 screenplay for Sony Pictures.

In September 2015, series producers Walter Parkes and Laurie MacDonald stated the series would be rebooted as a trilogy, most likely without the involvement of Will Smith.

In December 2014, it was revealed that Sony was planning a crossover between Men in Black and Jump Street. The news was leaked after Sony's system was hacked and then confirmed by the directors of the Jump Street films, Chris Miller and Phil Lord, during an interview. James Bobin was announced as director in 2016. On April 13, 2016, the movie was officially announced and revealed to be titled MIB 23. In 2016, Hill expressed doubts and said the project was unlikely to happen, and that it was too complicated to make it work.

A standalone sequel titled Men in Black: International was released in June 2019, starring Chris Hemsworth and Tessa Thompson, with Emma Thompson reprising her role.

In December 2025, it was reported that work had begun on a fifth film, with a script being written by Chris Bremner (Bad Boys For Life).

== See also ==
- Apollo 11 in popular culture
