= Men in Black (1997 film) =

1997 film by Barry Sonnenfeld

- Theatrical release poster
- Directed by: Barry Sonnenfeld
- Written by: Ed Solomon
- Based on: The Men in Black by Lowell Cunningham
- Produced by: Walter F. Parkes; Laurie MacDonald
- Starring: Tommy Lee Jones; Will Smith; Linda Fiorentino; Vincent D'Onofrio; Rip Torn
- Cinematography: Donald Peterman
- Edited by: Jim Miller
- Music by: Danny Elfman
- Production companies: Columbia Pictures; Amblin Entertainment; Parkes/MacDonald Productions
- Distributed by: Sony Pictures Releasing
- Release date: July 2, 1997 (United States)
- Running time: 98 minutes
- Country: United States
- Language: English
- Budget: $90 million
- Box office: $589.4 million

Men in Black (abbreviated as MIB) is a 1997 American science fiction action comedy film directed by Barry Sonnenfeld and written by Ed Solomon, based on the Marvel Comics series The Men in Black by Lowell Cunningham. Tommy Lee Jones and Will Smith respectively star as Agent K and Agent J, who investigate a series of seemingly unrelated criminal incidents related to the extraterrestrials who live in secret on Earth. Linda Fiorentino, Vincent D'Onofrio and Rip Torn appear in supporting roles.

Development for the film began in 1992, after producers Walter F. Parkes and Laurie MacDonald optioned the rights to the comic book series. Solomon was soon hired to write the screenplay; Sonnenfeld was the preferred directorial choice, which resulted in delays due to his commitments to other film projects and a failure to secure any alternative directors. Principal photography began in March 1996 and lasted until that June, primarily taking place in New York City. The film's visual effects were created by Industrial Light & Magic and its soundtrack contains the theme song of the same title, performed by Smith, as well as the score, composed by Danny Elfman.

Men in Black premiered at Pacific's Cinerama Dome in Hollywood on June 25, 1997 and was theatrically released in the United States on July 2 by Sony Pictures Releasing through its Columbia Pictures label. It received critical acclaim for its screenplay, humor and action sequences, as well as Jones's and Smith's performances and chemistry. The film was a box-office success, grossing more than $589.4 million worldwide and becoming the third-highest-grossing film of 1997 as well as the ninth-highest-grossing film of the decade. It won for Best Makeup and was additionally nominated for Best Art Direction and Best Original Score at the 70th Academy Awards, among numerous other accolades. A sequel was released in 2002, a third film was released in 2012 and a stand-alone sequel with Jones and Smith absent was released in 2019.

== Plot ==
In the mid-1950s, the Men in Black (MIB) organization was founded. After secretly making first contact with extraterrestrials in 1961, this small government agency, albeit underfunded, becomes fully independent and secret. The MIB designates Earth as a neutral zone for space alien refugees who live in secret among humans. Agents monitor alien activity and use "neuralyzer" devices, which erase their human targets' memories, to maintain secrecy.

In 1997, MIB agents K and D disrupt a border patrol operation at the Mexico–United States border to capture a disguised alien. When it becomes violent, K dispatches it and neuralyzes the patrol officers. D, feeling too old to continue, asks K to neuralyze him so he can retire.

Soon after, NYPD officer James Darrell Edwards III apprehends a suspect, unaware that he is an alien; the suspect warns of a coming threat before committing suicide. K, impressed by James's performance, recruits him into the MIB. After completing a series of tests, James becomes Agent J and his previous identity is erased from public records.

Meanwhile, a hostile alien known as a "Bug" crash-lands in upstate New York. It murders a farmer named Edgar and uses his deboned corpse as a disguise. K and J, tipped off by a tabloid news article, question Edgar's wife. They learn that the Bug has murdered two aliens who were living on Earth in disguise. Their bodies, along with their pet cat, are sent to a morgue overseen by Coroner Dr. Laurel Weaver.

At the morgue, the alien tells J and Laurel that "the galaxy is on Orion's Belt" before dying. After neuralyzing Laurel, K identifies the alien as Gentle Rosenberg, a prince from the Arquillian Empire. K and J visit Frank the Pug, an alien informant, who explains that Rosenberg was protecting a miniature galaxy. The galaxy is a powerful energy source that the Bug wants to use to destroy the Arquillians. An Arquillian warship soon arrives in Earth's orbit and demands that the MIB return the galaxy or they will destroy the planet.

J and the Bug both realize the galaxy is on the collar of Rosenberg's cat, Orion, which is now with Laurel; the latter captures her and seizes the galaxy. As the Arquillians prepare to destroy Earth to stop the Bug, the MIB locks down all transportation. J guesses the Bug will head to the New York State Pavilion, where the MIB hid flying saucers during the 1964–65 World's Fair.

At the site, the Bug tries to escape with Laurel, but she briefly breaks free. K and J shoot down the ship, which crash-lands in Corona Park. The Bug sheds its disguise, revealing its true appearance and swallowing the agents' weapons. K allows himself to be eaten so he can retrieve his weapon from inside. J distracts the Bug until K shoots it apart from within; Laurel uses J's gun to vanquish it.

After returning the galaxy to the Arquillians, K reveals that he was training J to take his place. J neuralyzes him so he can retire. Later, J continues his work with Laurel, who has joined the MIB as Agent L.

A long zoom-out shot reveals that the universe is contained in a marble owned by an unknown alien.

== Cast ==
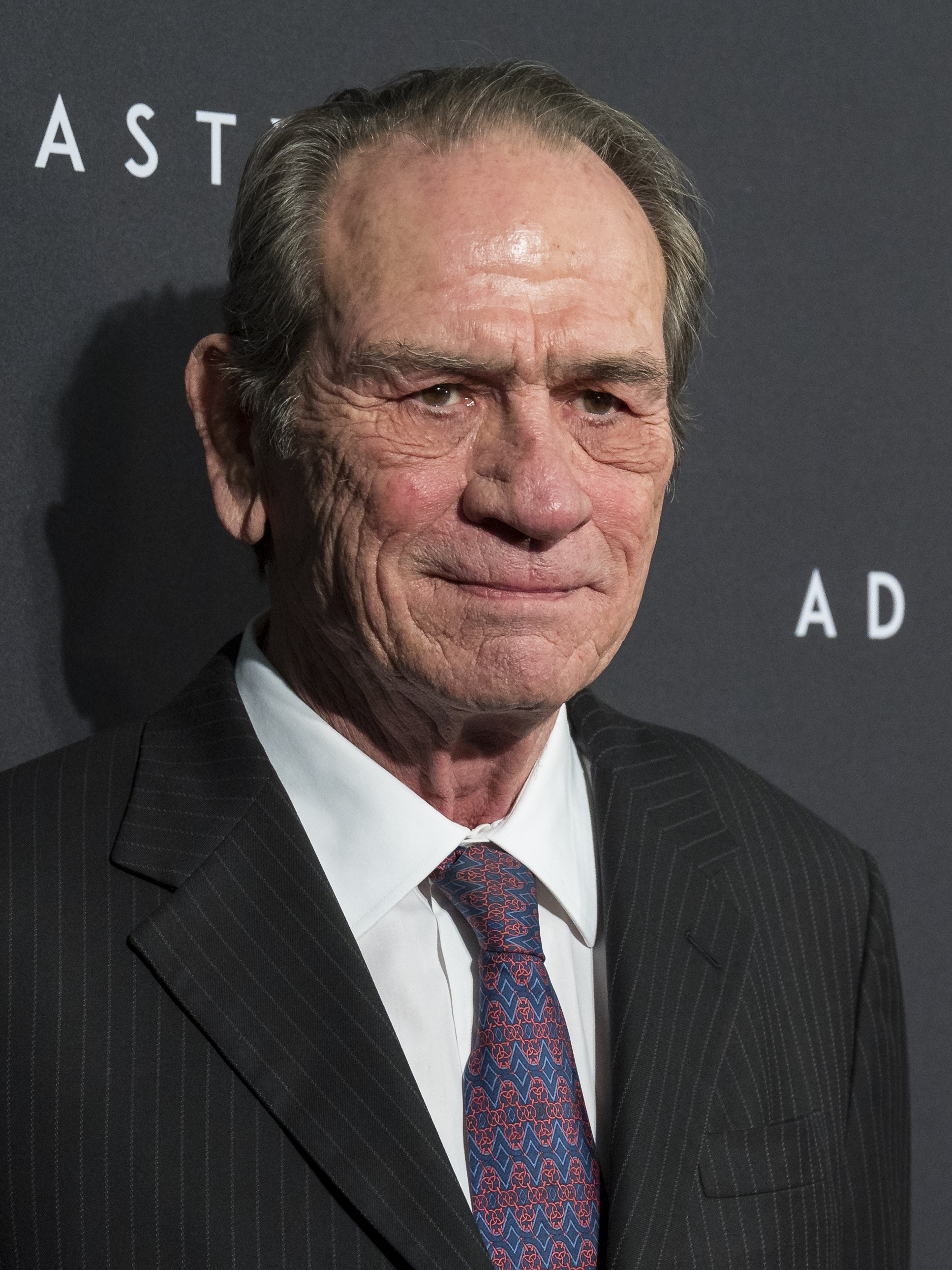
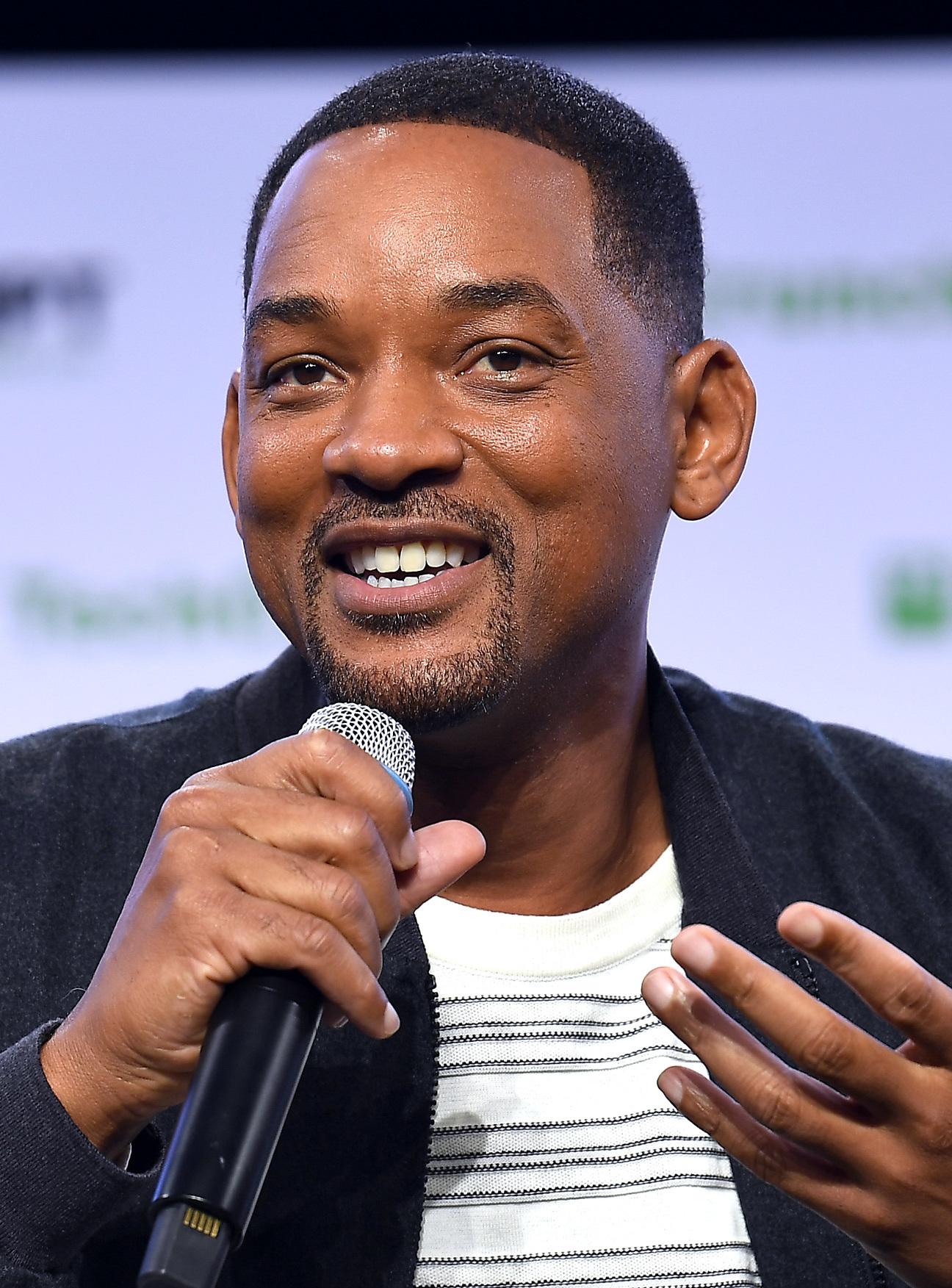
Tommy Lee Jones (top) and Will Smith in 2019
- Tommy Lee Jones as Kevin Brown / Agent K: J's grizzled mentor. The studio wanted Clint Eastwood for the part but Eastwood rejected it, instead choosing to direct and star in his own film, Absolute Power (1997). Eastwood reportedly suspected that Men in Black was not the right fit, while Jones only accepted the role after Steven Spielberg promised the script would improve, based on his respect for Spielberg's track record. He had been disappointed with the first draft, which he reportedly said "stank", feeling it did not capture the tone of the comic. Tom Selleck, Burt Reynolds, Liam Neeson (who would eventually play High-T in Men in Black: International) Sylvester Stallone, Al Pacino, Dennis Quaid, John Travolta and Robert De Niro were also reportedly considered for the role of K.
- Will Smith as James Darrell Edwards III / Agent J: A former NYPD detective, newly recruited to the MIB. Smith was cast because Barry Sonnenfeld's wife was a fan of The Fresh Prince of Bel-Air. Sonnenfeld additionally liked his performance in Six Degrees of Separation. The studio and Spielberg preferred Chris O'Donnell for the role, fresh off his portrayal of Dick Grayson, whom he played in Batman Forever and Batman & Robin, and Spielberg told Sonnenfeld to take him to dinner to convince him to do it. However, Sonnenfeld got him to not accept the role by saying that he was not a good director and that the script was one O'Donnell should skip. David Schwimmer also turned down the part, a decision he later regretted when reflecting in 2024. Like Jones, Smith said he accepted the role after meeting with Spielberg and cited his success as a producer.
- Linda Fiorentino as Doctor Laurel Weaver / Agent L: A deputy medical examiner and later J's partner.
- Vincent D'Onofrio as Edgar / The Bug: An abusive farmer who is murdered by a giant alien insect, which then uses his deboned corpse as a disguise as it searches for the Galaxy. John Turturro was offered the role, but turned it down due to scheduling conflicts. D'Onofrio based Edgar's voice on actors such as George C. Scott and John Huston.
- Rip Torn as Chief Zed: The head of the MIB.
- Tony Shalhoub as Jack Jeebs: An alien arms dealer who runs a pawn shop as a front.
- Siobhan Fallon Hogan as Beatrice: Edgar's abused wife.
- Mike Nussbaum as Gentle Rosenberg: An Arquillian royal family member, posing as a jeweler, who is the guardian of "the Galaxy".
- Jon Gries as Nick the van driver: the American smuggler who unknowingly carries a literal alien among his posse.
- Sergio Calderón as Jose
- John Alexander as Mikey: An alien who poses as a Mexican being smuggled across the border.
- Patrick Breen as Mr. Redgick
- Becky Ann Baker as Mrs. Redgick
- Carel Struycken as an Arquillian
- Fredric Lehne as Agent Janus
- Kent Faulcon as Second Lieutenant Jake Jensen
- Richard Hamilton as Agent D: K's former partner who retires after deciding he is too old for the job.
- Ken Thorley as The Zap-Em Man, a pest control official who is murdered by the Bug
- David Cross as Newton, the morgue attendant
- Sean Whalen as a passport officer
- Verne Troyer as the alien son
- Harsh Nayyar as a news vendor
- Bernard Gilkey as himself (New York Mets outfielder)

=== Voices/Puppeteers ===
- Tim Blaney as Frank the Pug: A smart-talking pug-like alien.
- Mark Setrakian as Gentle Rosenberg
- Brad Abrell, Thom Fountain, Carl J. Johnson and Drew Massey as the Worm Guys: A quartet of worm-like aliens that work for Men in Black.

== Production ==
=== Development ===
The film is loosely based on Lowell Cunningham and Sandy Carruthers's comic book The Men in Black. Producers Walter F. Parkes and Laurie MacDonald optioned the rights to The Men in Black in 1992, and hired Ed Solomon to write a very faithful script. Parkes and MacDonald wanted Barry Sonnenfeld as director because he had helmed the darkly humorous The Addams Family and its sequel Addams Family Values. However, Sonnenfeld was attached to Get Shorty (1995), so they instead approached Les Mayfield (best known for his remake of Miracle on 34th Street). Mayfield was briefly attached before it fell through. John Landis and Quentin Tarantino were asked to direct but each declined. As a result, Men in Black was delayed, allowing Sonnenfeld to make it his next project after Get Shorty.

Much of the initial script drafts were set underground, with locations ranging from Kansas to Washington, D.C., and Nevada. Sonnenfeld decided to change the location to New York City, because Sonnenfeld felt New Yorkers would be tolerant of aliens who behaved oddly while disguised, terming the movie as "The French Connection with aliens". He also felt much of the city's structures resembled flying saucers and rocket ships. One of the locations Sonnenfeld thought perfect for the movie was a giant ventilation structure for the Brooklyn–Battery Tunnel, which became the outside of the MIB headquarters.

=== Filming ===
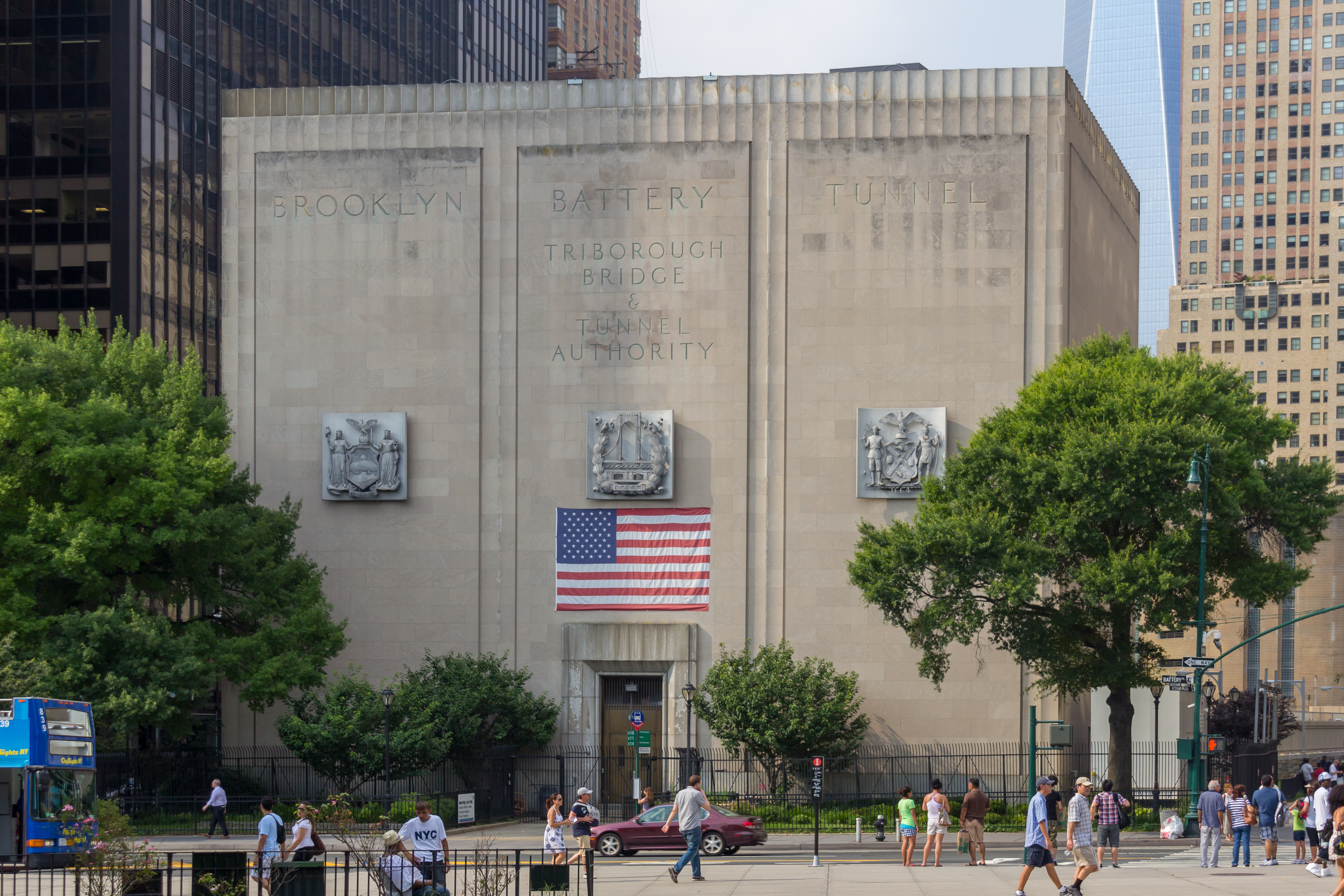
The Brooklyn-Battery Tunnel ventilation building in New York, which was used as the setting for MIB headquarters

Principal photography began in March 1996. Many last-minute changes ensued during production. First, the scene where James Edwards was chasing a disguised alien was to be filmed at Lincoln Center, but the New York Philharmonic decided to charge the filmmakers for using their buildings, prompting Sonnenfeld to film the scene at the Solomon R. Guggenheim Museum instead. Then, five months into the shoot, Sonnenfeld decided that the original ending, with a humorous existential debate between Agent J and the Bug, was unexciting and lacking the action that the rest of the film had. Five potential replacements were discussed. One of these had Laurel Weaver being neuralyzed and K remaining an agent. Eventually it boiled down to the Bug eating K and fighting J, replacing the animatronic Bug Rick Baker's crew had developed with a computer-generated Bug with an appearance closer to a cockroach. The whole action sequence cost an extra $4.5 million to the filmmakers.

Further changes were made during post-production to simplify the plotline involving the possession of the tiny galaxy. The Arquillians would hand over the galaxy to the Baltians, ending a long war. The Bugs need to feed on the casualties and steal the galaxy to continue the war. Through changing subtitles, the images on M.I.B.'s main computer and Frank the Pug's dialogue, the Baltians were eliminated from the plot. Earth goes from being potentially destroyed in the crossfire between the two races to being possibly destroyed by the Arquillians themselves to prevent the Bugs from getting the galaxy. These changes to the plot were carried out when only two weeks remained in the film's post-production, but the film's novelization still contains the Baltians.

=== Design and visual effects ===
Production designer Bo Welch designed the MIB headquarters with a 1960s tone in mind, because that was when their organization was formed. He cited influences from Finnish architect Eero Saarinen, who designed a terminal at John F. Kennedy International Airport. As the arrival point of aliens on Earth, Welch felt the headquarters had to resemble an airport.

Rick Baker was approached to provide the prosthetic and animatronic aliens, many of whom would have otherworldly designs instead of looking humanoid. For example, the reveal of Gentle Rosenberg's Arquillian nature went from a man with a light under his neck's skin to a small alien hidden inside a human head. Baker would describe Men in Black as the most complex production in his career, "requiring more sketches than all my previous movies together". Baker had to have approval from both Sonnenfeld and Spielberg: "It was like, 'Steven likes the head on this one and Barry really likes the body on this one, so why don't you do a mix and match?' And I'd say, because it wouldn't make any sense". Sonnenfeld also changed a lot of the film's aesthetic during pre-production: "I started out saying aliens shouldn't be what humans perceive them to be. Why do they need eyes? So Rick did these great designs, and I'd say, 'That's great — but how do we know where he's looking?' I ended up where everyone else did, only I took three months." The maquettes built by Baker's team were later digitized by Industrial Light & Magic, which was responsible for the visual effects and computer-generated imagery, for more mobile digital versions of the aliens.

== Music ==
Two different soundtracks for the film were released: a score soundtrack featuring music composed by Danny Elfman, and an album of songs used in and inspired by the film, featuring Will Smith's original song "Men in Black" based on the film's plot.

Elfman's music was called "rousing" by the Los Angeles Times. Variety called the film a technical marvel, giving special credit to "Elfman's always lively score." Elfman was nominated for Best Original Musical or Comedy Score at the 70th Academy Awards for his score, but lost to The Full Monty.

Elfman recalled in 2017 how he was chosen to compose the soundtrack as "strange." He was on the set of The Frighteners with Peter Jackson when D'Onofrio, who was shooting Men In Black on the other set, walked in and invited both men to watch him perform the final scene. Then on the way home, Elfman got a call from his agent saying that he was hired to compose the soundtrack, even though there was no discussion about it prior.

Elvis Presley's song "Promised Land" is featured in the scene where the MIB's car runs on the ceiling of Queens–Midtown Tunnel.

== Release ==
=== Marketing ===
In advance of the film's theatrical release, its marketing campaign included more than 30 licensees. Galoob was the first to license, in which they released various action figures of the film's characters and aliens. Ray-Ban also partnered the film with a $5–10 million television campaign. Other promotional items included Hamilton Watches and Procter & Gamble's Head & Shoulders with the tagline "Keeping the Men in Black in black".

An official comic adaptation was released by Marvel Comics. The film also received a third-person shooter Men in Black game developed by Gigawatt Studios and published by Gremlin Interactive, which was released to lackluster reviews in October 1997 for the PC and the following year for the PlayStation. Also, a very rare promotional PlayStation video game system was released in 1997 with the Men in Black logo on the CD lid. Three months after the film's release, an animated series based on Men in Black, produced by Columbia TriStar Television alongside Adelaide Productions and Amblin Television, began airing on The WB's Kids' WB programming block, and also inspired several games. A Men in Black role-playing game was also released in 1997 by West End Games.

=== Home media ===
Men in Black was first released on VHS and LaserDisc on November 25, 1997, by Columbia TriStar Home Video. The home video release was attached to a rebate offer on a pair of Ray-Ban Predator-model sunglasses. The film was re-released in a collector's series on VHS and DVD on September 5, 2000, with the DVD containing several bonus features including an interactive editing workshop for three different scenes from the film, extended storyboards, conceptual art, and a visual commentary track with Tommy Lee Jones and director Barry Sonnenfeld; an alternate two-disc Deluxe Edition was released in 2002, adding a fullscreen version and a preview for Men In Black II. A Blu-ray edition was released on June 17, 2008. The entire Men in Black trilogy was released on 4K Ultra HD Blu-ray on December 5, 2017, in conjunction with the film's 20th anniversary.

== Reception ==
=== Box office ===
In the United States and Canada, Men in Black earned $4.8 million from Tuesday night previews and went on to gross $14 million on its opening Wednesday, bringing the total gross to $18.8 million. The film grossed $84.1 million over the five-day Fourth of July weekend, and $51.1 million over the Friday through Sunday weekend, making it the third-largest opening weekend ever, behind The Lost World: Jurassic Park and Batman Forever. It surpassed Independence Day for three records: biggest three-day Fourth of July opening weekend, largest July opening weekend, and highest opening weekend for a non-sequel film. The film would hold the latter two records for three years until 2000 when X-Men took them. Two years later, its successor Men in Black II broke its record for the highest three-day Fourth of July opening weekend. Moreover, Men in Black held the record for having the highest opening weekend for an action comedy film until Rush Hour 2 surpassed it in 2001. It would remain in the number one spot at the box office for three weeks until it was overtaken by Air Force One. The film also competed against Hercules and Batman & Robin during its theatrical run.

Men in Black grossed $250.6 million in the United States and Canada, and $338.7 million in other territories, for a worldwide total of $589.3 million. It would hold the record for being Sony's highest-grossing film until it was surpassed by Spider-Man five years later in 2002. The film grossed a record $10.7 million in its opening weekend in Germany, beating the record held by Independence Day.

Despite its grosses, writer Ed Solomon has said that Sony claims the film has never turned a profit, which is attributed to Hollywood accounting.

=== Critical response ===
On review aggregation website Rotten Tomatoes, Men in Black holds an approval rating of 91% based on 92 reviews, and an average score of 7.50/10. The site's critical consensus reads, "Thanks to a smart script, spectacular set pieces, and charismatic performances from its leads, Men in Black is an entirely satisfying summer blockbuster hit." On Metacritic, the film has a weighted average score of 71 out of 100, based on 22 critics, indicating "generally favorable reviews". Audiences polled by CinemaScore gave the film an average grade of "B+" on an A+ to F scale.

Gene Siskel of the Chicago Tribune gave the film three-and-a-half stars out of four, praising the film as "a smart, funny and hip adventure film in a summer of car wrecks and explosions". Roger Ebert of the Chicago Sun-Times gave the film three stars out of four, giving particular praise to the film's self-reflective humor and Rick Baker's alien creature designs. Janet Maslin, reviewing for The New York Times, wrote the film "is actually a shade more deadpan and peculiar than such across-the-board marketing makes it sound. It's also extraordinarily ambitious, with all-star design and special-effects talent and a genuinely artful visual style. As with his Addams Family films and Get Shorty, which were more overtly funny than the sneakily subtle Men in Black, Mr. Sonnenfeld takes offbeat genre material and makes it boldly mainstream."

Writing for Variety, Todd McCarthy acknowledged the film was "witty and sometimes surreal sci-fi comedy" in which he praised the visual effects, Baker's creature designs, and Elfman's musical score. However, he felt the film "doesn't manage to sustain this level of inventiveness, delight and surprise throughout the remaining two-thirds of the picture." Owen Gleiberman of Entertainment Weekly graded the film a C+, writing "Men in Black celebrates the triumph of attitude over everything else – plausibility, passion, any sense that what we're watching actually matters. The aliens, for all their slimy visual zest, aren't particularly scary or funny (they aren't allowed to become characters), and so the joke of watching Smith and Jones crack wise in their faces quickly wears thin."

John Hartl of The Seattle Times claimed the film "is moderately amusing, well-constructed and mercifully short, but it fails to deliver on the zaniness of its first half." While he was complimentary of the film's first half, he concluded "somewhere around the midpoint they run out of energy and invention. Even the aliens, once they stop their shape-shifting ways and settle down to appear as themselves, begin to look familiar".

=== Accolades ===
Men in Black won Best Makeup at the 70th Academy Awards and was also nominated for Best Original Musical or Comedy Score and Best Art Direction, losing the latter two to The Full Monty and Titanic, respectively. The film was also nominated for Best Motion Picture – Musical or Comedy at the 55th Golden Globe Awards, losing to As Good as It Gets.

Award	Category	Recipient	Result
Academy Awards	Best Art Direction	Art Direction: Bo Welch; Set Decoration: Cheryl Carasik	Nominated
Academy Awards	Best Makeup	Rick Baker and David LeRoy Anderson	Won
Academy Awards	Best Original Musical or Comedy Score	Danny Elfman	Nominated
Golden Globe Awards	Best Comedy or Musical		Nominated
BAFTA Awards	Best Special Effects		Nominated
Saturn Awards	Best Science Fiction Film		Won
Saturn Awards	Best Director	Barry Sonnenfeld	Nominated
Saturn Awards	Best Writing	Ed Solomon	Nominated
Saturn Awards	Best Actor	Will Smith	Nominated
Saturn Awards	Best Supporting Actor	Vincent D'Onofrio	Won
Saturn Awards	Best Music	Danny Elfman	Won
Saturn Awards	Best Make-Up		Nominated
Saturn Awards	Best Special Effects		Nominated
Satellite Awards	Best Actor – Musical or Comedy	Tommy Lee Jones	Nominated
Satellite Awards	Best Animated or Mixed Media Film		Won
Satellite Awards	Best Supporting Actor – Musical or Comedy	Rip Torn	Nominated
Satellite Awards	Best Supporting Actress – Musical or Comedy	Linda Fiorentino	Nominated
Satellite Awards	Best Visual Effects		Nominated
Blockbuster Entertainment Awards	Favorite Actor – Science Fiction	Will Smith	Won
Blockbuster Entertainment Awards	Favorite Actor – Science Fiction	Tommy Lee Jones	Nominated
Blockbuster Entertainment Awards	Favorite Supporting Actor – Science Fiction	Vincent D'Onofrio	Nominated
Blockbuster Entertainment Awards	Favorite Supporting Actress – Science Fiction	Linda Fiorentino	Nominated
Blockbuster Entertainment Awards	Favorite Soundtrack		Won

On Empire magazine's list of the 500 Greatest Movies of All Time, "Men in Black" placed 409th. Following the film's release, Ray-Ban stated sales of their Predator 2 sunglasses (worn by the organization to deflect neuralyzers) tripled to $5 million.

=== Year-end lists ===
American Film Institute Lists

- AFI's 100 Years...100 Laughs - Nominated
- AFI's 100 Years...100 Heroes and Villains:
  - Agent J & Agent K - Nominated Heroes
- AFI's 100 Years...100 Songs:
  - "Men in Black" - Nominated
- AFI's 100 Years...100 Movie Quotes:
  - "You know the difference between you and me? I make this look good." - Nominated
- AFI's 10 Top 10 - Nominated Science Fiction Film

== Antecedents and influence in UFO conspiracy theories ==
The film drew inspiration from the 1956 book They Knew Too Much About Flying Saucers, which alleged UFO witnesses were being silenced by mysterious black-clad agents. While prior conspiracy films had taken the perspective of conspiracy theorists, Men in Black took the perspective of the conspirators. The film was the first time 'Men in Black" appeared in a major movie, cementing the Men in Black in popular culture. The film 'poked fun' at government debunking, with one of the Men in Black telling a witness "The flash of light you saw was not a UFO, swamp gas from a weather balloon was trapped in a thermal pocket and reflected the light from Venus"—a combination of 'official explanations' the Air Force has offered for UFO reports.

== See also ==
- List of films featuring extraterrestrials
