= Men in Black (film series) =

Film series

- Franchise logo
- Created by: Lowell Cunningham
- Original work: Men in Black (1997)
- Owners: Sony Pictures Releasing; Columbia Pictures
- Years: 1997–2019
- Based on: The Men in Black by Lowell Cunningham

Films and television
- Film(s): Men in Black; Men in Black II; Men in Black 3 Men in Black: International

Men in Black (also known as MIB) is a series of American science fiction action comedy films directed by Barry Sonnenfeld, and based on the Malibu / Marvel comic book series The Men in Black by Lowell Cunningham, which was itself based on a UFO conspiracy theory. The first film, Men in Black, was released in 1997, the second film, Men in Black II in 2002, the third film, Men in Black 3 in 2012, and the fourth film, a spin-off, Men in Black: International in 2019. Amblin Entertainment and MacDonald/Parkes Productions produced, and Sony Pictures Releasing through its Columbia Pictures label released, all four films.

== Films ==
Film	U.S. release date	Director	Screenwriter(s)	Story by	Producers
Men in Black	July 2, 1997	Barry Sonnenfeld	Ed Solomon	Ed Solomon	Walter Parkes & Laurie MacDonald
Men in Black II	July 3, 2002	Barry Sonnenfeld	Barry Fanaro & Robert Gordon	Robert Gordon	Walter Parkes & Laurie MacDonald
Men in Black 3	May 25, 2012	Barry Sonnenfeld	Etan Cohen	Etan Cohen	Walter Parkes & Laurie MacDonald
Men in Black: International	June 14, 2019	F. Gary Gray	Art Marcum & Matt Holloway	Art Marcum & Matt Holloway	Walter Parkes & Laurie MacDonald

=== Men in Black (1997) ===
Men in Black is the first film in the series. The film follows the exploits of Agent J and Agent K, members of a top-secret organization established to monitor and police alien activity on Earth. After Agent K hand-picks James D. Edwards from the NYPD and recruits him for MIB, the two Men in Black find themselves in the middle of the deadly plot by an intergalactic terrorist who has arrived on Earth to steal an energy source of unimaginable power. To prevent worlds from colliding, the MIB must track down the terrorist and prevent the destruction of Earth. It's just another typical day for the Men in Black. The film was released on July 2, 1997, to positive reviews and grossed $589 million worldwide.

=== Men in Black II (2002) ===
Men in Black II is the second film in the series, set five years after the first. For Agent J, it is another day at the office, monitoring, licensing, and policing all alien activity on Earth. Agent K retired from MIB after the events of the first film, had his memories of them wiped, and returned to his former life. One day, J receives a report of an unauthorized landing of an alien spacecraft near New York. It is an old enemy of MIB, a Kylothian named Serleena, who is searching for a powerful artifact called The Light of Zartha. J investigates and realizes that it requires knowledge of events that only K possesses. After other recruited MIB agents fail to meet J's standards as a partner, J decides to bring back K and restore K's memory as an MIB agent to try to stop Serleena. Men in Black II was released on July 3, 2002, to mixed reviews and grossed $441 million worldwide.

=== Men in Black 3 (2012) ===
Men in Black 3 is the third film in the series. When the notorious alien criminal Boris the Animal escapes LunarMax Security Prison to seek revenge on K for capturing him in 1969, he can use secret time-travel technology to go back in time and undo the events of his defeat, resulting in a new timeline where K is killed during his fight with Boris and Earth is now vulnerable to an invasion from his species. With J the only one who remembers the original history, he must go back in time to join forces with the younger K and ensure that events play out as they should. Men in Black 3 was released on May 25, 2012, to positive reviews and grossed over $624 million worldwide.

Featuring Josh Brolin as young K.

=== Men in Black: International (2019) ===
In the film, rookie MIB recruit Molly Wright and Agent H from MIB's UK branch investigate the activities of the shape-shifting alien duo Twins, who are seeking a dangerous artifact, only to discover that there is a more dangerous threat: a mole in the agency. Agent O from Men in Black 3 returns, and Frank the Pug appears in a cameo after appearing in the first two films. The film was released on June 14, 2019. Unlike its predecessors, Men in Black: International received mostly negative reviews and was a box office disappointment, grossing only $253 million worldwide, making it the lowest grossing film in the series.

=== Future ===
Both Smith and Jones have said that they would "consider" appearing in a Men in Black 4, with Jones saying that it would be fun to do it again. In July 2012, Columbia chief executive Doug Belgrad said that they are interested to continue the franchise after MIB 3's successful financial performance. Both Barry Sonnenfeld and Will Smith expressed interest on another project, also saying that they would like to see Will's son Jaden Smith in it. In early 2013, Oren Uziel was writing a Men in Black 4 screenplay for Sony Pictures. In December 2025, a new entry in the franchise was announced with Chris Bremner writing the screenplay.

== Cast and crew ==
=== Principal cast ===
List indicators

This section includes characters who will appear or have appeared in the series.

- An empty grey cell indicates the character was not in the film, or that the character's official presence has not yet been confirmed.
- ^{P} indicates an appearance in onscreen photographs.
- ^{V} indicates a voice-only role.
- ^{Y} indicates a younger version of the character.

Characters
Characters	Men in Black	Men in Black II	Men in Black 3	Men in Black: International
Characters	1997	2002	2012	2019
Agent J James Darrell Edwards III	Will Smith	Will Smith	Will Smith Cayen Martin^{Y}	Will Smith^{P}
Agent K Kevin Brown	Tommy Lee Jones	Tommy Lee Jones	Tommy Lee Jones Josh Brolin^{Y}	Tommy Lee Jones^{P}
Chief Zed	Rip Torn	Rip Torn	Kirk Larsen (Note: Larsen portrays Chief Zed as a corpse.)	
Frank the Pug Agent F	Tim Blaney^{V} Mushu the Dog	Tim Blaney^{V} Mushu the Dog	Mushu the Dog^{P}	Tim Blaney^{V}
Jack Jeebs	Tony Shalhoub	Tony Shalhoub		
Newton	David Cross	David Cross		
Agent O			Emma Thompson Alice Eve^{Y}	Emma Thompson
Worm Guys	Thom Fountain^{V}	Thom Fountain^{V}	Thom Fountain^{V}	Thom Fountain^{V}
Worm Guys	Brad Abrell^{V}	Brad Abrell^{V}	Brad Abrell^{V}	Drew Massey^{V}
Worm Guys	Carl J. Johnson^{V}	Carl J. Johnson^{V}	Carl J. Johnson^{V}	Drew Massey^{V}
Worm Guys	Drew Massey^{V}	Greg Ballora^{V}	Tim Blaney^{V}	Drew Massey^{V}
Security Guard	Alpheus Merchant	Alpheus Merchant	Woodie King Jr.	Vincent Pirillo
Diner Waitress Mom		Alexandra O'Hara	Alexandra O'Hara	
Agent T		Patrick Warburton		
Agent M		Michael Jackson		
Laurel Weaver Agent L	Linda Fiorentino			
Edgar the Bug	Vincent D'Onofrio			Vincent D'Onofrio^{P}
Derrick Cunningham Agent D	Richard Hamilton			
Beatrice	Siobhan Fallon Hogan			
Gentle Rosenberg	Mike Nussbaum			
Serleena Kylothian Queen		Lara Flynn Boyle		
Laura Vasquez The Light of Zartha		Rosario Dawson		
Scrad and Charlie		Johnny Knoxville		
Hailey		Colombe Jacobsen		
Jarra		John Alexander		
Boris the Animal			Jemaine Clement	
Griffin The Arcanian			Michael Stuhlbarg	
James Darrell Edwards II			Mike Colter	
Lilly Poison			Nicole Scherzinger	
Jeffrey Price			Michael Chernus	
Agent X			David Rasche	
Agent AA			Will Arnett	
Andy Warhol Agent W			Bill Hader	
Mr. Wu			Keone Young	
Agent M Molly Wright				Tessa Thompson Mandeiya Flory^{Y}
Agent H Henry				Chris Hemsworth
Pawny				Kumail Nanjiani^{V}
High T				Liam Neeson
Agent C				Rafe Spall
Riza Stavros				Rebecca Ferguson
The Twins				Les Twins

=== Additional crew ===
Film	Crew/Detail					
Film	Composer(s)	Cinematographer	Editor(s)	Production companies	Distributing company	Running time
Men in Black	Danny Elfman	Don Peterman	Jim Miller	Amblin Entertainment; Parkes/MacDonald Productions; Columbia Pictures Corporation	Columbia Pictures Corporation	98 minutes
Men in Black II	Danny Elfman	Greg Gardiner	Steven Weisberg; Richard Pearson	Columbia Pictures; Amblin Entertainment; MacDonald Parkes Productions	Columbia Pictures	88 minutes
Men in Black 3	Danny Elfman	Bill Pope	Don Zimmerman	P+M Image Nation; Amblin Entertainment; Imagenation Abu Dhabi; Hemisphere Media Capital; Columbia Pictures Corporation	Columbia Pictures Corporation	106 minutes
Men in Black: International	Chris Bacon; Danny Elfman	Stuart Dryburgh	Zene Baker; Christian Wagner	P+M Image Nation; Amblin Entertainment; The Hideaway Entertainment; Columbia Pictures Corporation; Sony Pictures Entertainment, Inc.	Sony Pictures Releasing	115 minutes

== Production ==
=== Development ===
==== Men in Black (1997) ====
The film is loosely based upon the comic book The Men in Black by Lowell Cunningham. Producers Walter F. Parkes and Laurie MacDonald optioned the rights to The Men in Black in 1992 and hired Ed Solomon to write a very faithful script. Parkes and MacDonald wanted Barry Sonnenfeld as director because he had helmed the darkly humorous The Addams Family and its sequel Addams Family Values. Sonnenfeld was attached to Get Shorty (1995), so they approached Les Mayfield to direct, as they had heard about the positive reception to his remake of Miracle on 34th Street. They actually saw the film later and decided it was inappropriate. Men in Black was delayed to allow Sonnenfeld to make it his next project after Get Shorty.

Much of the initial script drafts were set underground, with locations ranging from Kansas to Washington, D.C. and Nevada. Sonnenfeld decided to change the location to New York City because the director felt New Yorkers would be tolerant of aliens who behaved oddly while disguised. He also felt that many of the city's structures resembled flying saucers and rocket ships. Production designer Bo Welch designed the MIB headquarters with a 1960s tone in mind, because that was when the organization was formed. He cited influences from Finnish architect Eero Saarinen, who designed a terminal at John F. Kennedy International Airport. Being the arrival point of aliens on Earth, Welch felt MIB HQ had to resemble an airport.

ILM provided most of the special effects. Rick Baker led the special effects of the film, which was the most complex in his career to date. He had to have approval from both director Barry Sonnenfeld and executive producer Steven Spielberg: "It was like, 'Steven likes the head on this one, and Barry really likes the body on this one, so why don't you do a mix and match?' And I'd say, because it wouldn't make any sense". Sonnenfeld also changed a lot of the film's aesthetic during pre-production: "I started out saying aliens shouldn't be what humans perceive them to be. Why do they need eyes? So Rick did these great designs, and I'd say, 'That's great — but how do we know where he's looking?' I ended up where everyone else did, only I took three months".

Filming began in March 1996. Five months into the shoot, the crew realized their ending was unexciting. It was originally meant to be a humorous existential debate between Agent J and the Bug, and five potential replacements were discussed. One of these had Laurel Weaver being neuralyzed and K remaining an agent. The change to a fight sequence annoyed Rick Baker, as their animatronic Bug had to be replaced with computer-generated imagery. Further changes were made during post-production to simplify the plotline involving the possession of the tiny galaxy. The Arquillians would hand over the galaxy to the Baltians, ending a long war. The bugs need to feed on the casualties of the war and steal their remains to continue the war. Through changing subtitles, the images on MIB's main computer and Frank the Pug's dialogue, the Baltians were eliminated from the plot. Earth goes from being potentially destroyed in the crossfire between the two races to being possibly destroyed by the Arquillians to prevent the bugs from getting the galaxy.

==== Men in Black II (2002) ====
Despite some initial involvement from David Koepp (who left to work on Spider-Man), the script for Men in Black II was written by Robert Gordon and later revised by Barry Fanaro (who added pop culture references, something which Gordon had deliberately avoided). Sonnenfeld took issue with the producers' focus on the love story between Will Smith's and Rosario Dawson's characters, saying that "I learned on Wild Wild West that audiences didn't want to see Will as the straight man. And until Tommy comes back into the movie, by definition Will's the straight man". Fanaro condensed the first part of the film and brought Agent K in earlier. The climax of the second film was originally to have taken place at New York City's World Trade Center, but was changed following the destruction of the buildings in the September 11 attacks. This also led to the ending being refilmed.

Supervising sound editor Skip Lievsay used a Synclavier to recreate and improve the original recording of the neuralyzer sound effect from the first film (which was the sound of a strobe flash as it recycles) by removing some distortion. For some of the scenes with the Serleena creature, the sound crew "took tree branches, put them inside a rubber membrane and pushed that around and added some water." For the special effects scene where the subway train is attacked by Jeff the Worm, a specially designed vise was used to crush a subway car and make it look as if it had been bitten in half.

==== Men in Black 3 (2012) ====
The premise of the third film was first proposed to Sonnenfeld by Smith during the filming of Men in Black II in 2002, with Smith suggesting that his character, Agent J, travel back in time to save his partner, Agent K, while at the same time exploring Agent K's backstory. Sonnenfeld said the idea "turned out to be a very long process of development, mainly because of the knotting [sic] issues of time travel...." The film was first announced on April 1, 2009, by Sony Pictures Entertainment president Rory Bruer during a Sony ShoWest presentation. By October, Etan Cohen had been hired to write the screenplay. As of March 2010, Will Smith remained undecided whether to join this film or another, The City That Sailed. Sonnenfeld in May confirmed the return of the protagonists played by Tommy Lee Jones and Smith. Both had expressed interest in 2008 in reprising their roles. Other staff includes Walter F. Parkes and Laurie MacDonald as producers, with Steven Spielberg as executive producer; all were producers of the two previous films.

In June, writer David Koepp was hired to rewrite the Cohen script. In June, the fan site SonyInsider.com posted what it described as a "clip [that] debuted at an exclusive Sony 3D TV launch event at Sony Pictures Studios", showing Smith dressed as Agent J wearing 3-D glasses and stating: "I know what you're thinking — 'M.I.B.', 3-D, we're going to be blowing stuff up and all that. But that's not really what we're doing right now. We're here for one purpose, and for one purpose only: Just to let you know that I'm about to make 3-D look good". A teaser poster for the film was also released on September 21. A third writer, Jeff Nathanson, was hired in November to rewrite the time-travel segment of the script in which the story takes place in 1969. Nathanson and Koepp, along with producer Spielberg, had previously worked together on the 2008 film Indiana Jones and the Kingdom of the Crystal Skull.

==== Men in Black: International (2019) ====
In 2018, Chris Hemsworth was attached to star in the film, directed by F. Gary Gray. Tessa Thompson joined the cast, while Liam Neeson was cast as the head of the UK branch of the agency. The film's script was written by Art Marcum and Matt Holloway and would be produced by Laurie MacDonald and Walter Parkes. Kumail Nanjiani, Rafe Spall, and Les Twins were added to the cast of the film. Danny Elfman, who scored the first three Men in Black films, returned to compose the score for the film alongside Chris Bacon.

Principal photography on the film began on July 9, 2018, at Leavesden Studios and on location in London, and continued in Morocco, Italy, and New York City. Emma Thompson reprised her role as Agent O in the film. Rebecca Ferguson joined the cast of the film. Filming was wrapped on October 17. Visual effects for the film were provided by Double Negative and supervised by Alessandro Ongaro with the help of Rodeo FX, Sony Pictures Imageworks and Method Studios.

== Reception ==
=== Critical response ===
Men in Black won the Academy Award for Best Makeup, and was also nominated for Best Original Score and Best Art Direction. It was also nominated for the Golden Globe of Best Motion Picture - Musical or Comedy. The film received overwhelmingly positive reviews from critics, having a 91% rating on the Rotten Tomatoes film critic website. Following the film's release, Ray-Ban said that the sales of their Predator 2 sunglasses (worn by the organization to deflect neuralyzers) tripled to $5 million.

The second film received mixed reviews from critics, gaining a 38% rating on Rotten Tomatoes, as opposed to the 91% rating given for its predecessor, based on 196 reviews and a Metacritic score of 49. A. O. Scott of The New York Times said that "within the trivial, ingratiating scope of its ambition, though, the sequel is pleasant enough", and, noting the huge array of aliens designed by Rick Baker, said that the film "really belongs to Mr. Baker". A review in The Hindu called the film "worth viewing once". Another review from Digital Media FX magazine praised the spaceships as looking very realistic, but criticized many of the simpler visual effects such as the moving backgrounds composited behind the car windows using blue-screen (which it called a throwback to the special effects of earlier decades). In August 2002, Entertainment Weekly placed the Worm Guys among their list of the best CG characters, and said that the enlarged roles of both Frank the Pug and the Worm Guys in Men in Black II was beneficial for the "tiring franchise". The film earned a Razzie Award nomination for Lara Flynn Boyle as Worst Supporting Actress.

Men in Black 3 received mostly positive reviews from film critics. The film holds a 67% approval rating on the Rotten Tomatoes with an average rating of 6/10, based on an aggregation of 250 reviews. It has a score of 58 on Metacritic based on 38 reviews, indicating "mixed or average reviews". Roger Ebert gave the film 3 out of 4 stars, in particular praising Josh Brolin's role as the young Agent K, which he cites as an excellent example of good casting. Ebert also praised the "ingenious plot, bizarre monsters, audacious cliff-hanging" and the "virtuoso final sequence". Richard Roeper gave it 3.5 out of 5 stars while saying: "It's that rare threequel that doesn't suck. Great special effects, surprising amount of heart". A. O. Scott of The New York Times also gave it 3.5 out of 5 stars and commented: "Men in Black 3 arrives in the multiplexes of the world with no particular agenda. Which may be part of the reason that it turns out to be so much fun". Lisa Schwarzbaum of Entertainment Weekly noted that "Sonnenfeld and Cohen move their baby along with an integrity and gait that ought to serve as a blueprint for other filmmakers faced with the particular challenges of reviving big-ticket and time-dated hunks of pop culture". Rafer Guzman of Newsday wrote: "The franchise is no longer the zenith of blockbusterism, and the gooey effects from Hollywood veteran Rick Baker look overly familiar, but Men in Black 3 remains an amiable comedy with some fondly familiar faces".

=== Box office performance ===
Film	Release date	Box office gross			Box office ranking		Budget	Reference
Film	Release date	North America	Other territories	Worldwide	All-time North America	All time worldwide	Budget	Reference
Men in Black	July 2, 1997	$250,690,539	$338,700,000	$589,390,539	126	158	$90 million	
Men in Black II	July 3, 2002	$190,418,803	$251,400,000	$441,818,803	225	252	$140 million	
Men in Black 3	May 25, 2012	$179,020,854	$445,005,922	$624,026,776	260	143	$215 million	
Men in Black: International	June 14, 2019	$80,001,807	$173,888,894	$253,890,701	985	583	$110 million	
Total		$700,132,003	$1,208,994,816	$1,909,126,819			$555 million	

=== Critical and public response ===
Film	Rotten Tomatoes	Metacritic	CinemaScore
Men in Black	91% (92 reviews)	71 (22 reviews)	B+
Men in Black II	38% (196 reviews)	49 (37 reviews)	B+
Men in Black 3	67% (250 reviews)	58 (38 reviews)	B+
Men in Black: International	23% (317 reviews)	38 (51 reviews)	B

== Cancelled projects ==
=== MIB 23 ===
In December 2014, it was revealed that Sony was planning a crossover between Men in Black and Jump Street. The news was leaked after Sony's system was hacked and then confirmed by the directors of the Jump Street films, Chris Miller and Phil Lord during an interview about it. James Bobin was announced as director in 2016. As of January 2019, the project was no longer in development. In an interview with ComicBook.com, Channing Tatum stated that he loved the script and retains hope that he'll be able to do it someday.
