= Men in Black: International =

2019 science fiction film by F. Gary Gray

- Theatrical release poster
- Directed by: F. Gary Gray
- Written by: Art Marcum; Matt Holloway
- Based on: The Men in Black by: Lowell Cunningham; Sandy Carruthers
- Produced by: Walter F. Parkes; Laurie MacDonald
- Starring: Chris Hemsworth; Tessa Thompson; Emma Thompson; Liam Neeson; Rebecca Ferguson; Kumail Nanjiani; Rafe Spall; Les Twins
- Cinematography: Stuart Dryburgh
- Edited by: Zene Baker; Christian Wagner; Matthew Willard
- Music by: Danny Elfman; Chris Bacon
- Production companies: Columbia Pictures; Amblin Entertainment; The Hideaway Entertainment
- Distributed by: Sony Pictures Releasing
- Release dates: June 11, 2019 (New York City); June 14, 2019 (United States)
- Running time: 115 minutes
- Country: United States
- Language: English
- Budget: $94–110 million
- Box office: $254 million

Men in Black: International (stylized as MIB: International in promotional material, also known as Men in Black 4: International) is a 2019 American science fiction action comedy film directed by F. Gary Gray and written by Art Marcum and Matt Holloway. It is the fourth in the Men in Black film series, based on The Men in Black comic book series, in turn based on the conspiracy theory. It is set in the same universe as the previous three films but is the first in the series to feature neither Will Smith nor Tommy Lee Jones. It stars Chris Hemsworth, Tessa Thompson, Emma Thompson, Liam Neeson, Rebecca Ferguson, Kumail Nanjiani, Rafe Spall, and Les Twins. The film follows the Men in Black taking on its biggest threat: a mole in the agency.

Talks of a fourth Men in Black film began after the release of Men in Black 3 in 2012. In February 2018, Hemsworth signed on to lead a spin-off, Gray was hired to direct, and Thompson joined the cast the following month. Filming took place in New York City, Morocco, Italy and London from July to October 2018. Danny Elfman, who had scored the previous three films, returned to compose the reboot with Chris Bacon. The film was marred by significant production strife between producer Walter F. Parkes and director Gray during the production.

Men in Black: International premiered in New York City on June 11, 2019, and was released in the United States on June 14. The film received generally negative reviews from critics, who criticized the lackluster action and forgettable plot. It grossed $254 million against a $94–110 million production budget. A fifth film is in development.

== Plot ==
In 1996 Brooklyn, Molly Wright witnesses her parents being neuralyzed by agents of Men in Black after they see an alien in their home. Molly helps the alien escape, avoiding neuralyzation herself. Twenty-three years later, rejected from government agencies due to her "delusions" regarding alien life, Molly tracks down an alien landing and follows MIB agents to their headquarters in New York City. Caught entering the agency, Molly makes an impression on Agent O after revealing she had bypassed neuralyzation, arguing that her obsessive search for them makes her "perfect" for the job and she has no life outside her search for the agency. She is awarded probationary agent status as "Agent M" and assigned to the organization's London branch.

There, M meets High T, head of the London branch, and Agent H. M learns that H and T fought off an invasion of the Hive, a parasitic race who invade planets by merging with the DNA of the conquered species, at the Eiffel Tower in 2016, using a wormhole included in the original migration to Earth. H has since become unconcerned with his duties and only keeping his job due to High T covering for him. M arranges for herself to be assigned to assist H in his meeting with alien royalty Vungus the Ugly, H's close friend.

During their night out with Vungus, they are accosted by mysterious alien Twins able to manifest as pure energy. The Twins fatally injure Vungus, who gives M a strange crystal before he dies, claiming that H has changed since they last met and cannot be trusted. M points out that few people knew Vungus' location, and he was likely betrayed by one of the agents present when High T assigned H to guard him. Nervous at the possibility of a traitor within MIB, High T assigns Agents C and M to investigate while H is demoted to desk duty, with evidence suggesting that the Twins had DNA traces of the Hive.

H convinces M to join him in following a lead to Marrakesh, where they recover "Pawny", the last survivor of a small group of aliens attacked by the Twins. Pawny pledges loyalty to M, and they are trapped by MIB agents coordinated by C, who recovered video footage of Vungus passing the crystal to M and believes she is the traitor. With the aid of alien contacts Nasr and Bassam, H escapes with M and Pawny on a rocket-powered bike, and they learn that Vungus' crystal is a weapon powered by a compressed blue giant. As they repair the damaged bike, Bassam steals the weapon and takes it to H's ex-girlfriend Riza Stavros, an alien arms dealer. Traveling to Riza's island fortress, the trio attempts to infiltrate the base, but is caught by Riza and her bodyguard Luca Brasi. Luca, the alien M rescued as a child, returns the favor by allowing them to leave with the weapon while he keeps Riza contained. The three are cornered by the Twins, who are killed by High T and a group of agents.

Although the case appears concluded, H and M review the evidence and realize that the Twins' phrases suggest they required the weapon to use against the Hive, especially when the only evidence of Hive DNA was provided by High T. They discover High T has deleted the case file and not sent the weapon to evidence, and has gone to the Eiffel Tower with the weapon. C also realizes High T's deception and allows H and M to follow High T to the Eiffel Tower. As they travel to the reopened wormhole, M's questioning of H's memory of the Hive's defeat reveals he was neuralyzed when the Hive converted T into one of their own during the battle. The High T/Hive hybrid activates a wormhole to draw the Hive to Earth, but H draws out High T's true personality long enough for M, with the help of Pawny, to use the weapon at full capacity to destroy both the hybrid and the Hive infestation trying to reach Earth.

With the truth of T's conversion exposed, Agent O joins H and M in Paris, where she grants M full agent status and appoints H probationary head of MIB's London branch.

== Cast ==
- Chris Hemsworth as Henry / Agent H, a top agent in the MIB UK branch
- Tessa Thompson as Molly Wright / Agent M, a rookie MIB recruit assigned to the UK branch
  - Mandeiya Flory as Young Molly
- Liam Neeson as High T, the head of the MIB UK branch
- Kumail Nanjiani (voice) as Pawny, a tiny alien warrior that H and M befriend
- Rafe Spall as Agent C, a senior MIB agent in the UK branch who is skeptical of H's past
- Rebecca Ferguson as Riza Stavros, an alien intergalactic arms dealer and H's ex-girlfriend
- Les Twins as the Twins, a shapeshifting alien twin duo seeking a dangerous artifact
  - Twin Larry Bourgeois also portrays the human that the Twins kill and base their appearance on
- Emma Thompson as Agent O, the head of the MIB US branch who operates out of New York
- Kayvan Novak as Vungus the Ugly, a member of an alien royal family and friend of H
  - Kayvan Novak also portrays Nasr and voices Bassam
- Annie Burkin as Nerlene
- Tim Blaney as Frank the Pug (voice)
- Spencer Wilding as Luca Brasi, an alien mobster who acts as personal bodyguard to Riza Stavros
- Marcy Harriell and Inny Clemons cameo as Molly's parents in a flashback
- Thom Fountain and Drew Massey as the Worm Guys (voices), worm-like aliens that work for MIB
- Stephen Wight as Guy / Stupid guy in a call center next to Molly
- Stefan Kalipha as Antique Shopkeeper

Ariana Grande, Elon Musk, and Donald Glover make uncredited cameos as themselves via archival footage as extraterrestrials discovered by MIB.

== Production ==
=== Development and casting ===
In February 2018, it was reported that Chris Hemsworth would star in the film, set to be directed by F. Gary Gray. The following month, Tessa Thompson joined the cast. In May 2018, it was reported that Liam Neeson was in talks to star as the head of the agency's UK branch. The film was written by Art Marcum and Matt Holloway and produced by Laurie MacDonald and Walter Parkes. In June 2018, Kumail Nanjiani, Rafe Spall and Les Twins (Laurent and Larry Bourgeois) were added to the cast. Danny Elfman, who scored the first three Men in Black films, returned to compose the score with Chris Bacon. Steven Spielberg executive-produced, as he did for the first three MIB entries, along with Barry Sonnenfeld, who directed all the previous films.

=== Filming ===
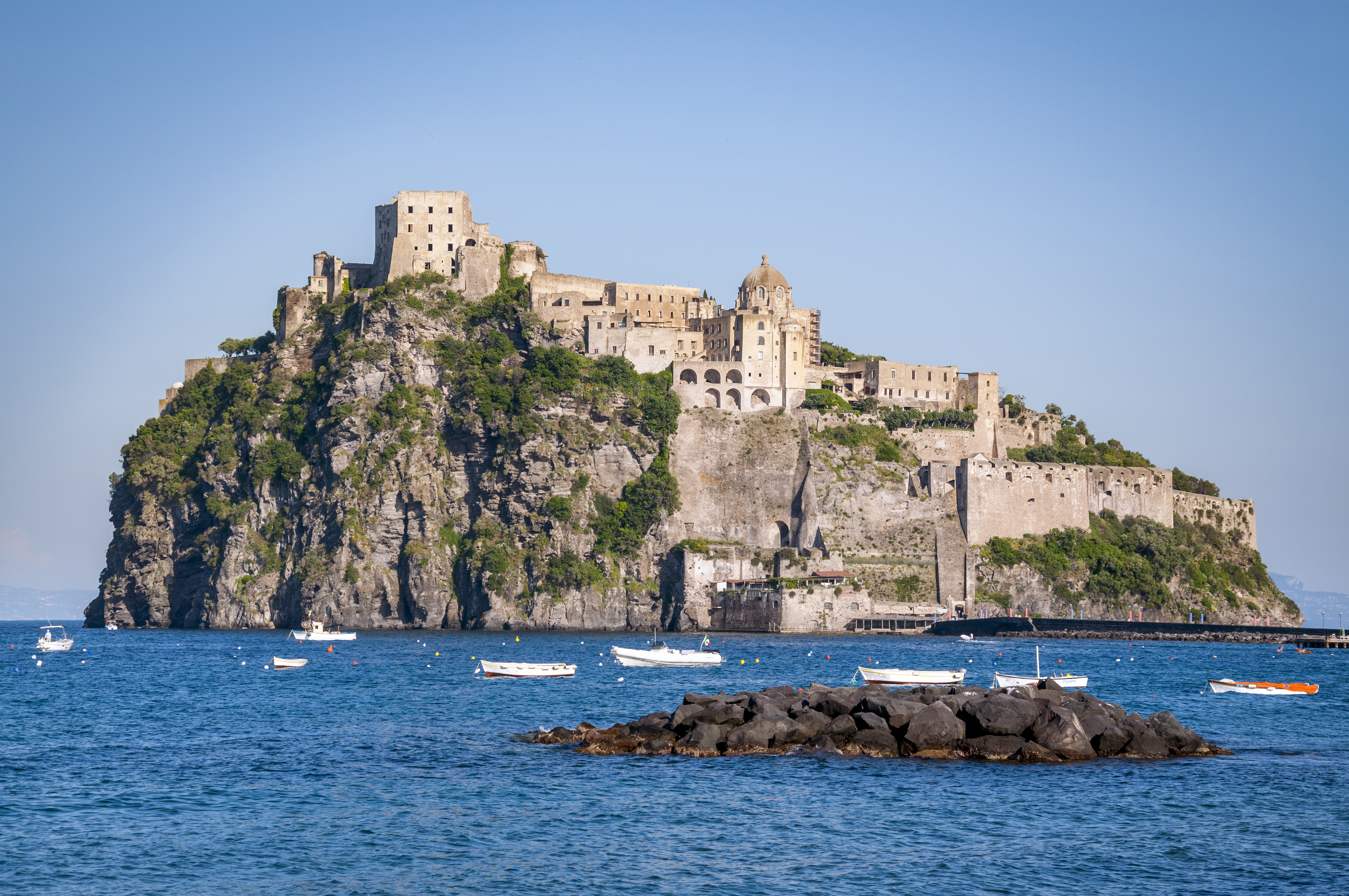
The Aragonese Castle in Ischia was one of the filming locations.

Principal photography began on July 9, 2018, at Leavesden Studios and on location in London, and continued in Marrakesh at the Jemaa el-Fnaa and El Badi Palace, Ischia and the Aragonese Castle, and New York City. Later that month, it was announced that Emma Thompson would reprise her role as Agent O. In August 2018, Rebecca Ferguson joined the cast. On October 17, Hemsworth confirmed that filming had wrapped. The vehicles used in the film were: the Lexus RC F and the Jaguar XJ 6 and the Rezvani Tank

=== Visual effects ===
Visual effects were provided by Double Negative, and supervised by Alessandro Ongaro with the help of Rodeo FX, Sony Pictures Imageworks and Method Studios.

=== Producer/director clash ===
The film experienced a troubled production due to frequent clashes between director Gray, and producer Parkes, which began when the executive overseeing the project, Sony executive vice president of production David Beaubaire, left the studio in the summer of 2018 and was not replaced.

An early draft of the script, which Sony initially praised, and which received the attention of stars Hemsworth and Thompson, had an edgier tone than the finished film, featuring sociopolitical commentary on the current debate surrounding immigration. The main antagonists were to be an alien music group inspired by the Beatles, with the four members merging into one villain during the climax.

Parkes, who had final cut on the film, had a heavy hand in overseeing rewrites during pre-production and filming, which he and MacDonald claimed were necessary because of the small prep time. The rewrites largely dealt with production/budget constraints (including changing several major locations), punch-ups for the actors, and reconceiving the villains. His new script pages stripped away the early draft's modern sensibilities, and were sent daily to Hemsworth and Thompson, who were both so confused that they hired their own dialogue writers. Parkes also stepped into traditional directing duties, although the Directors Guild of America did not get involved. Parkes and Gray also clashed over the color-correction process in post-production.

Gray tried to exit the production several times but was convinced to stay by Sony. The studio tested two cuts, one by Gray, the other by Parkes, and Parkes' was chosen as the theatrical cut.

=== Music ===
Danny Elfman returned to compose International due to having scored the three previous Men in Black films with Chris Bacon, his protégé and fellow composer, working with him on co-producing and arranging his scores as the co-composer.

== Release ==
=== Theatrical ===
The film was scheduled for theatrical release on May 17, 2019, but was pushed back to June 14. It premiered in New York City on June 11, 2019.

=== Marketing ===
Deadline Hollywood estimated that Sony would spend around $120 million on prints and advertising for the film, a figure considered on the "lower end" for a tentpole feature. They also partnered with several companies to promote it, including Lexus, Hamilton Watches, Zaxby's, Dave & Buster's and Booking.com, for an estimated $75 million worth of advertising.

Lexus partnered with Sony Pictures to feature their vehicles in the film: the RC and RX, both in their F Sport variants. They also designed an alien-looking spaceship based on the body of their RC model.

=== Home media ===
The film was released on Digital HD on August 20, 2019, and on Blu-ray, Ultra HD Blu-ray and DVD on September 3, 2019, in the United States.

== Reception ==
=== Box office ===
Men in Black: International cost $94–110 million to make plus another estimated $120 million for marketing in addition to ancillary market expenses. It was estimated that it would need to gross $220–300 million worldwide to break even. It grossed $80 million in the United States and Canada, and $174 million in other territories, for a worldwide total of $254 million.

In the United States and Canada, it was released alongside Shaft and the wide expansion of Late Night, and was projected to gross $30–40 million from 4,224 theaters in its opening weekend. It made $10.4 million on its first day, including $3.1 million from Thursday night previews. It went on to debut to $30 million, topping the weekend box office but coming in below expectations, and making it the first film in the series not to open above $50 million. The underwhelming opening was blamed on the dated franchise, poor critical reviews and audience anticipation for other, upcoming big releases Toy Story 4 and Spider-Man: Far From Home. The film fell 64% in its second weekend to $10.7 million, finishing fourth, then made $6.7 million in its third weekend, finishing sixth.

Worldwide, it was released concurrently with the United States in 56 additional countries and was projected to gross $70–85 million, for a worldwide debut of $100–115 million. It ended up making $73.7 million overseas and $102.2 million globally, finishing first in 36 of the markets. It underperformed in Asian countries like China ($26.3 million) and South Korea ($4.9 million) due to poor word-of-mouth, similar to the US, although it finished first in Mexico ($3.9 million), Brazil ($1.8 million), Russia ($5.1 million), the United Kingdom ($3.4 million), Australia ($2.6 million) and France ($2.5 million).

=== Critical response ===
On Rotten Tomatoes, Men in Black: International has an approval rating of 23% based on 316 reviews with an average rating of 4.5/10. The website's critical consensus reads, "Amiable yet forgettable, MIB International grinds its stars' substantial chemistry through the gears of a franchise running low on reasons to continue." On Metacritic, the film has a weighted average score of 38 out of 100, based on 51 critics, indicating "generally unfavorable reviews". Audiences polled by CinemaScore gave the film an average grade of "B" on an A+ to F scale, the lowest score of the franchise, while those at PostTrak gave it a 72% overall positive score and a 46% "definite recommend".

Peter Bradshaw of The Guardian called it "Men in Black, making another intensely tiresome and pointless reappearance," and gave the film 1 out of 5 stars. Peter DeBruge of Variety said that "The connection between Tessa Thompson and Hemsworth is what saves the day, not anything their characters do onscreen" and called the film itself "amusing, if uneven." Michael Phillips of the Chicago Tribune gave the film 2.5 out of 4 stars, writing: "Men in Black: International isn't bad; it's an improvement over Men in Black II (2002) and Men in Black 3 (2012), sequels that even its makers may have forgotten. As a species we appear destined to revisit this basic concept and renew the hunt for fresh variations on the zingy, disarming first picture, which brought the Lowell Cunningham comics to the screen so shrewdly and well in 1997."

== Sequel ==
Before production on International, both Will Smith and Tommy Lee Jones said that they would "consider" appearing in a fourth film. Jones said it would be "easy to pick up where we left off. We know what we are doing, we know how to do it. It's just a hell of a lot of fun."

In July 2012, Columbia chief executive Doug Belgrad said:

We're very pleased with the financial performance of Men in Black 3, and we believe it is an ongoing franchise. We're going to do [another one], but we don't have clarity yet on how it should be done.

By early 2013, Oren Uziel had begun writing a Men in Black 4 screenplay for Sony Pictures.

In September 2015, series producers Walter Parkes and Laurie MacDonald stated the series would be rebooted as a trilogy, most likely without the involvement of Will Smith.

In December 2014, it was revealed that Sony was planning a crossover between Men in Black and Jump Street. The news was leaked after Sony's system was hacked and then confirmed by the directors of the Jump Street films, Chris Miller and Phil Lord, during an interview. James Bobin was announced as director in 2016. On April 13, 2016, the movie was officially announced and revealed to be titled MIB 23. In 2016, Jonah Hill expressed doubts and said the project was unlikely to happen, and that it was too complicated to make it work.

In December 2025, it was reported that work had begun on a fifth film, with a script being written by Chris Bremner (Bad Boys For Life).
