= Agent J =

Fictional character in the Men in Black franchise

- Men in Black character
- Will Smith as Agent J
- First appearance: Comic: The Men in Black (1990); Film: Men in Black (1997)
- Last appearance: Men in Black 3 (2012)
- Created by: Lowell Cunningham
- Adapted by: Ed Solomon
- Portrayed by: Will Smith; Cayen Martin (Young)
- Voiced by: Keith Diamond

In-universe information
- Full name: James Darrel Edwards III
- Nicknames: Jay; J
- Species: Human
- Gender: Male
- Occupation: Former NYPD detective MIB agent
- Nationality: American

Agent J (usually called J), born James Darrell Edwards III, is one of the two protagonists of the Men in Black film series. Born October 19, 1965, Jay is an agent of the MIB, recruited by Agent K. He is energetic and tries to bring life and emotion back to the bland organization. He is portrayed by Will Smith in the Men in Black film franchise, as well as in the amusement park ride Men in Black: Alien Attack at Universal Studios Florida. He is voiced by Keith Diamond in the animated series.

== Biography ==
=== Early life ===
Not much is known about the life of J (or James Darrel Edwards III) prior to being recruited into MIB. According to the documents of his identity deleted as he joined MIB, James was born on the island of Manhattan, New York City. His father, United States Army Colonel James Darrell Edwards Jr, was working security at Kennedy Space Center for the Apollo 11 launch, when he was murdered by the alien Boris the Animal after assisting Agent K in stopping a chain of events that would have led to K's death and a large-scale invasion of Earth forty years later. Nothing else is known about the preceding twenty-eight years except that James became a member of the New York City Police Department sometime in or before the 1990s. J is said to be a big fan of video games and rap music. A line of dialogue from Men in Black II suggests he owned a Game Boy. He also attended a popular fitness gym chain called Gold's Gym prior to his life as an agent.

=== Men in Black ===
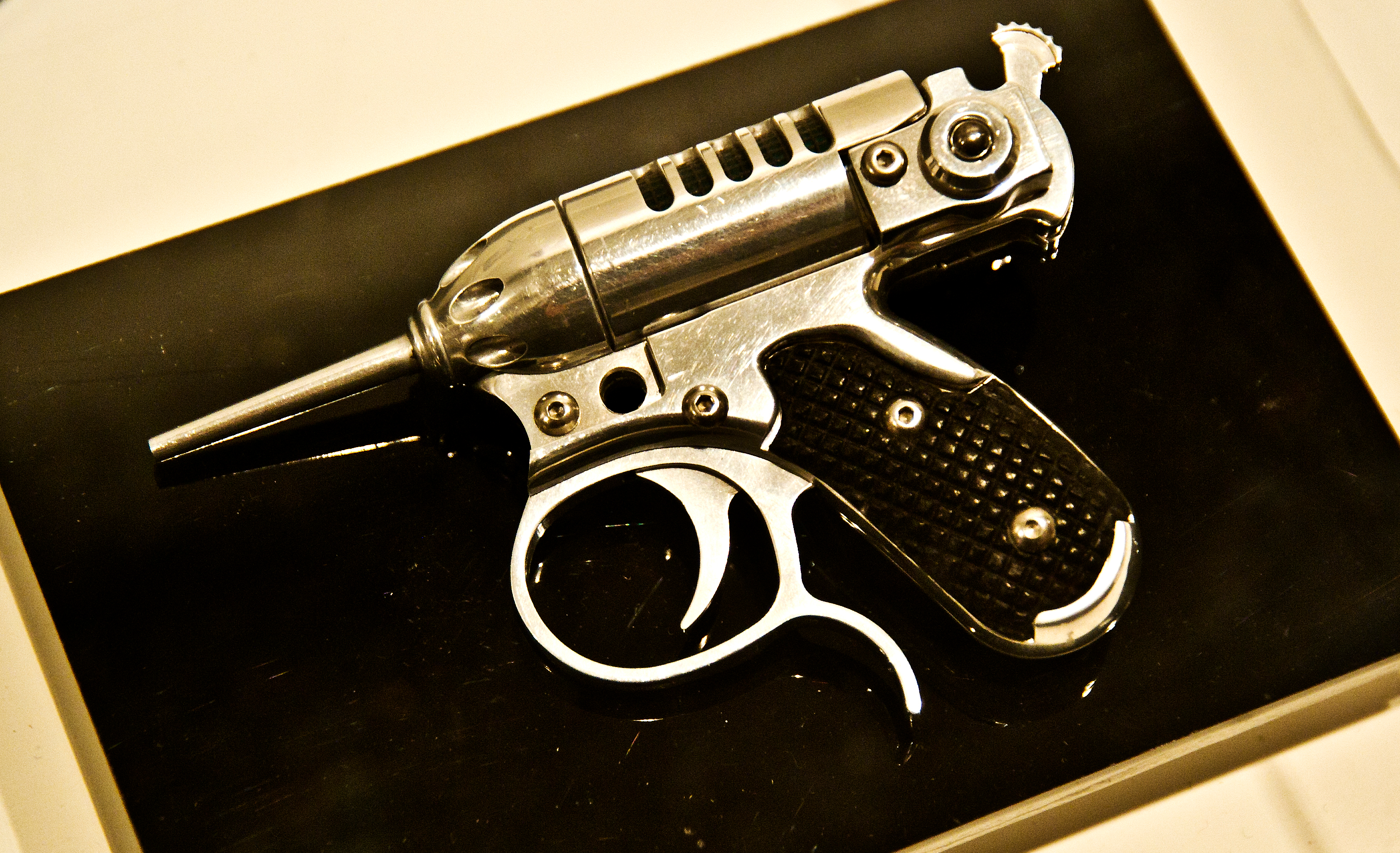
J's signature weapon, the "noisy cricket", as seen in the first film

Agent J's MIB career starts out when, as Officer Edwards III, he runs down a swift, wall-climbing alien on foot. When Men in Black Agent K notices his potential, he recruits J into the organization (within the continuity of the series, the events of Men in Black 3 imply that K recognized J from their meeting in the 60s). At first, J is suspicious, but he decides to join. He is registered as "Agent J" and his energetic, enthusiastic attitude brings humor to a bland organization. J is not fond of K's diminutive references to him (son, sport, slick, kid, etc.), but gets used to it.

In his various featured adventures, he encounters Frank the Pug, the dog who is really an alien; finds out that Jeebs, a previously shown pawn store owner, is actually an alien, not just a buyer of stolen goods from chain snatchers like he originally thought when he was a detective; and delivers a baby squid-like alien. Their first official mission is to stop an alien bug from leaving Earth with a tiny galaxy before the Arquillians (who demand the return of the galaxy) disintegrate the planet.

During the final confrontation with the bug, K is swallowed by it in an attempt to get his gun back, leaving J to keep him on Earth. When he starts squishing cockroaches, the bug confronts him, but before it can attack him, K shoots it from the inside. The bug was finally killed by Dr. Laurel Weaver (Linda Fiorentino), a morgue worker whom the bug kidnapped and J's love interest. When K requests to be neuralyzed (a memory-wiping procedure) to retire, J fulfills the request and his new partner is Laurel, who becomes known as Agent L.

=== Men in Black: The Series ===
Throughout the series, Agent J is continually treated like a rookie. For example, he is rarely allowed to drive an official Men in Black Car, many secrets are kept from him, they don't let him handle certain equipment, among other things. In addition to these things, he remains the partner of Agent K. Into the animated series, J makes his issued weapon, the "Noisy Cricket", less noisy by attaching a Silencer to it. During his short period of termination in the episode “The J Is For James Syndrome”, it is shown that J lived with an aunt of his named Rose, who's known for making meatloaf for herself and her nephew during dinner.

=== Men in Black II ===
At some point between the first and second film, L goes back to her morgue career, and J has gained a reputation for neuralyzing all of his successors for, in his opinion, unsuitability to work at Men in Black. J also saved the world from an invasion by the species known as the Krelon, who, according to K, are the "Backstreet boys of the universe". At the beginning of the film, he neuralyzes his new partner Agent T because he forces T to admit that he joined the agency to be a hero, something that is fundamentally impossible in the Men in Black due to the secretive nature of the organization. This has earned the annoyance of his superior, Zed, who confronts J and tells him he needs to stop neuralyzing his partners. Despite these shortcomings however, he has developed into one of the most highly regarded agents within MIB.

During the film, J has a particular enmity with the alien criminal known as Jarra, whom J stopped from stealing the Earth's ozone layer.

=== Men in Black 3 ===
In the third film, J has become a well-respected, Rank "Men in Black" agent in the year 2012. He continues to work with K but is frustrated by K keeping secrets from him, which is supposedly done for his own good. The escaped alien criminal Boris the Animal time-travels back to 1969 and murders a young K, which could result in the end of the world as K was no longer present to establish a force field that could permanently protect Earth from invasion by the Boglodites (Boris' species).

=== Men in Black: International ===
Agent J does not appear in Men in Black: International, but he makes a cameo in a painting in High-T's office.

=== Other ===
In Waiting in the Summer, Agent J doesn't appear, but is often referred by Ichika Takatsuki with fear of being captured by him. David Schwimmer was offered the role but rejected it.

== See also ==
- Agent K
- The Men in Black (comics), inspiration for the fictional characters and stories

== Notes ==
Chronological mistake: In Men in Black (1997 film) while Kay is deleting his identity, his date of birth is shown as October 19, 1969.
