= Agent K =

Character in the Men in Black franchise

- Men in Black character
- Tommy Lee Jones as Agent K
- First appearance: Comic: The Men in Black (1990); Film: Men in Black
- Last appearance: Men in Black 3 (2012)
- Created by: Lowell Cunningham
- Adapted by: Ed Solomon
- Portrayed by: Tommy Lee Jones; Josh Brolin (Young)
- Voiced by: Ed O'Ross (Season 1); Gregg Berger (Seasons 2-4)

In-universe information
- Full name: Kevin Brown
- Nicknames: Kay; K Mr. K
- Species: Human
- Gender: Male
- Occupation: MIB agent Postal worker (Men in Black II)
- Nationality: American

Agent K (usually called K), born Kevin Cunningham Brown, is a fictional character and one of the two main protagonists of the Men in Black franchise (the other being Agent J). Kay is portrayed by Tommy Lee Jones in the three films, with Josh Brolin portraying his younger self in the third film, and voiced by Ed O'Ross and Gregg Berger in the animated series. The film's trading card series and Men in Black: The Game give K's full name as Kevin Cunningham, a nod to Lowell Cunningham, the creator of the comic.

== Fictional character biography ==
=== Men in Black ===
In the first film, K works with Agent J (Col. Edwards' son), to stop a "Bug" (one of an alien race who feed on carnage caused by wars) from stealing a miniature galaxy before the Bug's enemies destroy Earth to prevent the theft. During the final confrontation with the Bug, it swallows the agents' guns, and K decides to let the Bug swallow him so he can get his gun back, while J distracts him from leaving Earth. Just as the Bug is about to eat J, K shoots it from the inside, and Dr. Laurel Weaver (a morgue worker whom the Bug kidnapped) finishes it off. K later requests that Agent J erase K's memories of his time with the MIB so that he can reunite with a woman he had loved before joining the MIB.

=== Men in Black: The Series ===
As the Men in Black animated series takes off from the end of the first film, but skips the plot after Dr. Weaver destroys the Bug, Agent K remains as Agent J's partner while Dr. Weaver has joined the MIB as a medical doctor at the MIB Headquarters. It is revealed early on in the series that a man known as Alpha was the founding Chief of MIB, and K's mentor, but later turned criminal.

=== Men in Black II ===
In the second film, at a post office in Truro, Massachusetts, Kevin Brown is recruited by Agent J, to recover the 'Light of Zartha'. After rescuing Laura, they fend off Serleena so they can send Laura safely off the Earth and back to her home planet.

=== Men in Black 3 ===
In the third film, Boris the Animal time-travels to 1969 and murders a young K (Josh Brolin), allowing the Boglodites to successfully invade Earth, and in response J travels back to 1969 both to save his mentor and best friend's life and to prevent the oncoming Boglodite invasion. When J arrives from the future to kill Boris at Coney Island, K arrests J and takes him to MIB headquarters, where J reveals his mission. Thereafter the precognitive alien 'Griffin the Arcanian' guides J and K to Cape Canaveral, Florida, where Col. Edwards helps them launch the ArcNet kill the future Boris but Col. Edwards dies in the process; whereupon K kills the past Boris to erase his future-self's actions. It is then revealed that Col. Edwards is J's father. K also erases young J’s memory to prevent him from being traumatized. This was observed by the older J, who now realizes that K has been watching over him all his life.

=== Men in Black: International ===
In the spin-off film, Agent K does not appear but he is seen in a painting in High-T's office.

== See also ==
- Agent J
- Men in Black (franchise)
