= Legends of Chima Vol. 2 (soundtrack) =

Soundtrack album by Anthony Lledo
- Released: April 21, 2015
- Genre: Soundtrack
- Length: 31:00
- Label: MovieScore Media
- Producer: Anthony Lledo

Anthony Lledo chronology
Legends of Chima (2013)	Legends of Chima Vol. 2 (2015)	The Purity of Vengeance (2018)

Legends of Chima Vol. 2 is the second soundtrack for the animated fantasy TV series of the same name. The orchestral score was composed by Anthony Lledo and released in 2015 on MovieScore Media.

== Track listing ==
No.	Title	Length
1.	"Return of the Heroes"	3:32
2.	"Into the Outlands"	3:16
3.	"The Dark Tribes"	4:19
4.	"Ancient Hunters"	3:02
5.	"The Phoenix"	3:27
6.	"Hills of Chima"	2:50
7.	"Lavertus"	3:28
8.	"Frozen Land"	2:21
9.	"The Tale of Tormak"	3:30
10.	"Victory"	2:13

== Credits ==
- Anthony Lledo - Composer, Orchestration, Score Producer, Album Producer
- Oleg Kondratenko - Conductor
- Orchestra - F.A.M.E.'s Macedonian Radio Symphonic Orchestra
- Sara Andon - Flute
- Ted Sugata - Oboe & Cor Anglais
- Amanda Walker - Clarinet & Bass Clarinet
- Giorgi Hristovski - Sound engineer
- Boban Apostolov - Pro Tools engineer
- Riste Trajkovski - Stage Manager
- Jeff Biggers - Music Engineer
- John Rodd - Album Mastering
- Laurent Koppitz - Orchestra Contractor
- Mikael Carlsson - Album Producer
