= Legends of Chima =

Animated television series

- Genre: Action; Adventure; Science fantasy
- Created by: Tommy Andreasen
- Based on: Lego Legends of Chima
- Developed by: Tommy Andreasen; Thomas Sørensen; Thomas Fenger
- Written by: John Derevlany
- Directed by: Peder Pedersen
- Voices of: David Attar; Bethany Brown; Bill Courage; Jesse Inocalla; Megan Kinsley; Michael Patric; Scott Shantz; Jeff Evans Todd
- Theme music composer: Finley
- Opening theme: "Unleash the Power" (Seasons 1–2) "Day of Glory" (Season 3)
- Composer: Anthony Lledo
- Countries of origin: Denmark; Canada
- Original language: English
- No. of seasons: 3
- No. of episodes: 41

Production
- Executive producers: Torsten Jacobsen; Mads Munk; Ole Holm-Christensen
- Producer: Lotte Kronborg
- Running time: 22 minutes
- Production companies: The Lego Group; M2 Entertainment

Original release
- Network: Cartoon Network
- Release: January 16, 2013 – November 22, 2014

Related
- Ninjago; Nexo Knights; Ninjago: Dragons Rising; Lego Dreamzzz

Legends of Chima, also known colloquially as Chima, is a 3D animated science fantasy television series created by Tommy Andreasen and produced by The Lego Group. It was created to coincide with the Lego Legends of Chima line of construction toys. It centers on the fictional world of Chima, a place inhabited by warring tribes of anthropomorphic animals. The series was broadcast on Cartoon Network in the United States. It began with two episodes that aired on January 16, 2013, with the Season 1 finale airing on December 5, 2013. On March 15, 2014, Season 2 premiered on Cartoon Network and ended on April 19 of the same year. Season 3 aired on August 9 and ended on November 22, 2014.

== Plot ==
The magical world of Chima is a pristine realm filled with tribes consisting of various anthropomorphic animals. It is later revealed to be part of the Wyldness, one of the 16 Realms near the realm of Ninjago. In ancient times, the Phoenixes settled on Mount Cavora, then the highest mountain in Chima. They had been sent by the sun to educate the groundborns, and so they did. Unfortunately, some chose to use their new knowledge to try and conquer Chima. There was a great war when the Hunter tribes led by the warlord sabertooth tiger Sir Fangar sought to subjugate the others. To defeat them, the phoenixes brought about a Great Illumination, condemning them to a dreamless sleep. The Great Illumination also caused Mount Cavora to ascend, becoming a floating mountain from which the Chi aters began to flow. The phoenixes took refuge with the surviving animals atop Mount Cavora, hiding from the rest of Chima. A thousand years later, new animals have drunk the waters of Chi and evolved, forming their own tribes. Only a few chose not to and left Chima, becoming known as the Legend Beasts. In Chima, everything depends on the spheres of Chi, which are the only source of energy. Inevitably civilizations suffered from regular warfare even before the present. The tribes have eventually learned that the Chi must be distributed equally among all the tribes of Chima, because if the balance were to be altered, Chima itself would revolt, causing earthquakes and storms. The protagonist of the series is the young lion prince Laval.

=== Season 1: The Power of the Chi ===
Laval and Cragger, princes of the lions and crocodiles respectively, are friends, but one day Cragger convinces Laval to break the law, triggering a chain of events that leads to a battle where Cragger's parents fall off a cliff and are presumed dead. Cragger longs for peace, but Crooler, his evil sister, uses on him a Persuader Plant, a flower that makes anyone who smells it obedient, and orders him to attack the lions and their allies the eagles and the gorillas, with the wolf and raven tribes as their allies, to steal all the Chi and take over Chima. Thus, a terrible war breaks out. In the second half of the season, Cragger reunites with Laval since the Plant withered. The wolves take advantage of this to begin stealing all the tribes' Chi, but they are defeated by Laval and Cragger. When peace seems to have returned to Chima, Crooler turns Cragger evil again using the Plant's root. The battle thus begins again, even more terrible than before, because a mysterious black cloud from the Outlands has enveloped Mount Cavora and blocked the Chi Falls. In the last episode, during the final battle, Cragger definitively turns good when Laval fakes his death. The battle ends when Laval unexpectedly appears with the Legend Crocodile and Cragger's mother, Queen Crunket, who explains that the Legend Beasts and King Crominus, Cragger's father, have been taken by new tribes, who are responsible for the black cloud, and only by joining forces can the tribes of Chima save them.

=== Season 2: Quest for the Legend Beasts ===
Laval, Cragger, Eris, Worriz, Gorzan, Razar, Rogon and Bladvic go to the Outlands to save Chima from the scorpions, spiders, and bats, who want to steal all the Chi. They also find a new ally: Lavertus, a bizarre lion who was exiled and has lived in the Outlands since. With his help, they manage to free the Legend Beasts and King Crominus. In the last episode, the scorpion king Scorm goes mad and tries to collapse all the exits of his cave to trap everyone in; Lavertus chooses to sacrifice himself to allow the others to escape, confessing to Laval to be his uncle. Back in Chima, the Legend Beasts fly to Mount Cavora and the Chi Falls begin to flow again. In the scorpion cave, Scorm blames the Chi and his sentience for his feeling of defeat and hopelessness and throws it away, thus awakening the Ice Hunter tribes.

=== Season 3: Legend of the Fire Chi ===
Chima is invaded by the saber-toothed tiger, mammoth, and vulture tribes, who freeze everything in their path. Thanks to Eris' visions, she, Laval, and Cragger are able to find the phoenix tribe, along with the tiger tribe, who aid the tribes of Chima against the Ice Hunters by providing them with Fire Chi. Laval also meets Li'Ella, a lioness with whom he falls in love. Toward the end the heroes begin their quest for the Fire Wings to stop the Hunter Tribes. The eight protagonists eventually find all 9 and, along with phoenix prince Flinx, they spark another Great Illumination, which purifies Chima and its inhabitants, including the Ice Hunters, who were joined by the ice bear tribe, turning it back into a pristine paradise. The phoenixes, since their duty is complete, leave Chima forever and the final image reveals that Chima and the Outlands are actually a massive floating mountain hovering above a much larger world: the Wyldness.

== Characters ==
=== The Lion Tribe ===
- Laval – Laval is the prince of the Lion Tribe and the main protagonist of the series. He attempts to do the right thing as the soon-to-be king, but his childish behavior and arrogance get the group into trouble.
- Lagravis – Lagravis is the gray-maned king of the Lion Tribe and the father of Laval.
- Lavertus / ShadoWind – Lavertus is Lagravis' brother and Laval's uncle and one of the greatest lion warriors. After being exiled upon Crominus using Persuader Plants on him to commit a crime, Lavertus took up the alias of ShadoWind where he sported a helmet that is shaped like the head of a common warthog. Lavertus would later be pardoned when Crominus' actions were exposed.
- Li'ella – Li'ella is the only named female lion who was raised by Tormak of the Fire Tribes and is also the girlfriend of Laval.
- Leonidas – Leonidas is a brave warrior member of the Lion Tribe and cannot do two things at a time.
- Lennox – Lennox is a brave warrior and foot soldier of the Lion Tribe.
- Longtooth – Longtooth is an older warrior of the Lion Tribe with scars and scratches.
- Lothar – Lothar is an elder lion of the Lion Tribe.

=== The Crocodile Tribe ===
- Cragger – Cragger is the prince of the Crocodile Tribe, the son of Crominus and Crunket, the twin brother of Crooler, and the best friend and former enemy of Laval due to his sister's manipulation with Persuader Plants. He ends up becoming one of the main protagonists in Seasons 2 and 3. He also has one white eye with a scar running across it.
- Crominus – Crominus is the King of the Crocodile Tribe, the husband of Queen Crunket, and the father of Cragger and Crooler.
- Crunket – Crunket is the queen of the Crocodile Tribe, the wife of Crominus, and the mother of Cragger and Crooler.
- Crooler – Crooler is the cunning princess of the Crocodile Tribe, the daughter of Crominus and Crunket, the twin sister of Cragger, and the main antagonist of Season 1.
- Crug – Crug is one of Cragger's two lead henchmen, is brown has a lower jaw of his mouth that is made of metal and is a big strong member of the Crocodile Tribe. He is known to sleep with a teddy bear.
- Crawley – Crawley is one of Cragger's two lead henchmen in the Crocodile Tribe. He is olive green in color and leads Cragger's Crocodile Warriors into battle.
- Crokenburg – Crokenburg is a Crocodile general who has a half-metal face.
- Cranvil – Cranvil is the blacksmith of the Crocodile Tribe and names weapons after the noises they make when hitting a solid surface. He is seen in the TV series.

=== The Eagle Tribe ===
- Eris – Eris is the princess of the Eagle Tribe and a close friend of Laval and Cragger.
- Ewald – Ewald is the head of the Eagle Tribe's ruling council.
- Elon – Elon is an elder of the Eagle Tribe.
- Equila – Equila is the Speedorz tournament announcer that wears red sunglasses.
- Eglor – Eglor is the inventor of the Eagle Tribe. His feathers are dark blue, and he wears a black flight suit with a red monocle.
- Ewar – Ewar is a soldier of the Eagle Tribe.
- Elkar – Elkar is a light blue member of the Eagle Tribe and is often shown with Ewald.

=== The Wolf Tribe ===
- Worriz – Worriz is the alpha male of the Wolf Tribe, formerly enemy and friend of Laval’s.
- Wilhurt – Wilhurt is a black wolf soldier and member of the Wolf Tribe and acts like Worriz's second in command.
- Winzar – Winzar is a gray wolf, who is a ferocious foot soldier member of the Wolf Tribe. He has three scars on his left eye.
- Windra – Windra is a white wolf who is a female member of the Wolf Tribe.
- Wakz – Wakz is the cunning elder of the Wolf Tribe with dark gray fur.
- Wonald – Wonald is a young child member of the Wolf Tribe. He's the only vegetarian and nice wolf pup which makes him an outsider to the tribe.

=== The Gorilla Tribe ===
- Gorzan – Gorzan is the prince of the peaceful Gorilla Tribe and close friends with Laval and Eris.
- Grumlo – Grumlo is a gray Gorilla and the leader of the Gorilla Tribe. He is also a member of the elder council.
- G'Loona – G'Loona is a member of the Gorilla Tribe who is an orphan girl that looks up to Gorzan.
- Grizzam – Grizzam is the white-furred Gorilla warrior of the Gorilla Tribe.
- Gompsy – Gompsy is a member of the Gorilla Tribe and has a weird hat.
- Gornay – Gornay are reddish-brown foot soldiers of the Gorilla Tribe.
- Gunter – Gunter is a member of the Gorilla Tribe.

=== The Raven Tribe ===
- Razar – Razar is the prince of the Raven Tribe and will ally himself with anyone with the right price tag, regardless of if it is right or wrong in morality.
- Rawzom – Rawzom is the unofficial King of the Raven Tribe.
- Razcal – Razcal is the accountant of the Raven Tribe who is very greedy, like Razar, but also seems to be conscious as well.
- Rizzo – Rizzo is the cyborg-like leader of some packs of the Raven Tribe.
- Ripnik – Ripnik is the Master Thief of the Raven Tribe.

=== The Rhino Tribe ===
- Rogon – Rogon is the strong but unintelligent prince of the Rhino Tribe, he harbors a crush on Eris which she reciprocates.
- Rinona – Rinona is a female member of the Rhino Tribe who is by far the smartest than her brother Rogon.
- Rhigor – Rhigor is a member of Chima's Elder Council which means that he is the leader of the Rhino Tribe.
- Runk – Runk is a foot soldier and brawler member of the Rhinoceros Tribe.
- Rukus – Rukus is a foot soldier and brawler member of the Rhinoceros Tribe.

=== The Bear Tribe ===
- Bladvic – Bladvic is the prince of the Bear Tribe who often sleeps, which makes him and his tribe seem a bit lazy. However, despite this they are mighty warriors when the Ice Hunters reawaken their enemy the Ice Bears.
- Balkar – Balkar is the King of the Bear Tribe with light brown fur.
- Bungey – Bungey is a member of the Bear Tribe with light brown fur and a dark brown muzzle.
- Bumpy – Bumpy is a member of the Bear Tribe.
- Bozy – Bozy is a member of the Bear Tribe.
- Buchuma – Buchuma is a member of the Bear Tribe who is very similar to Bozy.
- Bulkar – Bulkar is a member of the Bear Tribe with brown fur.

=== The Beaver Tribe ===
- Bezar – Bezar is a white beaver who is the apparent leader of the Beaver Tribe, obsessed with building or fixing things for other tribes, and will punish his subjects with vacations.
- Breezor – Breezor is a light brown beaver that resembles Bezar and is the apparent leader of the Beaver Tribe.
- Buber – Buber is a foreman worker and warrior member of the Beaver Tribe who is brown and white.
- Bubic – Bubic is a foreman worker and warrior member of the Beaver Tribe who is brown and white.
- Bunic – Bunic is a member of the Beaver Tribe.

=== The Crawler Tribes ===
The Crawler Tribes are the result of some Chi Orbs ending up underground and coming in contact with some of the creatures there.

==== The Scorpion Tribe ====
- Scorm – Scorm is the King of the Scorpion Tribe and the main antagonist of Season 2.
- Scutter – Scutter is a scorpion soldier whose appearance has him almost similar to scorpion man.
- Scolder – Scolder is a gray scorpion soldier who is the general of the Scorpion Tribe.
- Scrug – Scrug is a dim-witted dark gray scorpion similar in appearance to Scutter, except for having regular minifigure legs.

==== The Spider Tribe ====
- Spinlyn – Spinlyn is the image-obsessed queen of the Spider Tribe who has an appearance that is similar to a drider.
- Sparratus – Sparratus is a member of the Spider Tribe.
- Sparacon – Sparacon is the chief spider soldier who has six legs.
- Spindle – Spindle is a spider soldier.

==== The Bat Tribe ====
- Braptor – Braptor is the King of the Bat Tribe who commanded his army to form the "Black Cloud" to deplete Mount Cavora of its supply of Chi. Unlike Scorm and Spinlyn, Braptor does not argue about who gave Chi to the Crawlers.
- Blista – Blista is a member of the Bat Tribe.

=== The Fire Tribes ===
The Fire Tribes reside on the top of Cavora and specialize in fire-based abilities.

==== The Phoenix Tribe ====
- Fluminox – Fluminox is the 10,000-year-old king of the Phoenix Tribe.
- Flinx – Flinx is the young prince of the Phoenix Tribe and Fluminox's son.
- Foltrax – Foltrax is a member of the Phoenix Tribe and is the captain of the Blazing Bastion.
- Frax – Frax is an orange-feathered member of the Phoenix Tribe.
- Firox – Firox is an orange-feathered member of the Phoenix Tribe with aviator goggles.

==== The Tiger Tribe ====
- Tormak / Panthor – Tormak is a Tiger Cat Guide and Li'ella's adopted father after he rescued her after the Hunters burned down her native village. Tormak is a noble adviser to Fluminox, and convinces him to give the Earthborn tribes of Chima a chance to prove themselves worthy of Fire Chi. After the Phoenix Map exploded, Tormak was burned badly by its energies which he absorbed which caused him to take on a black tiger appearance and be mistaken for a panther by some characters. A symbol is on one top of his head. He was later restored to normal by the Illumination that also purified the Ice Hunter Tribes.
- Tazar – Tazar is a Tiger Cat Guide and one of the guards
- Trakkar – Trakkar is a Tiger Cat Guide. Trakkar is also one of the guards as seen in Episode 31.

=== The Ice Hunter Tribes ===
The Ice Hunter Tribes are a tribe that used ice-based abilities where their revival left them with transparent parts.

==== The Saber-Toothed Tiger Tribe ====
- Sir Fangar – Sir Fangar is the cold-hearted leader of the Saber-Tooth Tiger Tribe who has a transparent left arm and a transparent right leg. His catchphrase is "Feel my/our freeze". He serves as the main antagonist of Season 3.
- Stealthor – Stealthor is the general of the Saber-Tooth Tiger Tribe. He has dark grey fur and a transparent left arm.
- Strainor – Strainor is a member of the Saber-Tooth Tiger Tribe. He has a transparent right leg.
- Sykor – Sykor is a feral member of the Saber-Tooth Tiger Tribe chained on a leash that is owned by Strainer. He has transparent ribs. Sykor tends to run off dragging Strainer with him.
- Sibress – Sibress is a female member of the Saber-Tooth Tiger Tribe with a transparent left arm and right leg.
- Sirox – Sirox is the General of the Saber-Tooth Tiger with dark blue fur and a transparent right leg.
- Saraw – Saraw is a member of the Saber-Tooth Tiger Tribe.

==== The Mammoth Tribe ====
- Mungus – Mungus is the prince of the Mammoth Tribe with an icy trunk and transparent ribs. Mungus is the younger brother of Mottrot and the son of Maula. As the biggest of the Ice Hunters, it took three Chi Orbs to reawaken him from his frozen sleep. Mungus is prone to playing with the Rhinos.
- Mottrot – Mottrot is the prince of the Mammoth tribe who is the son of Maula and the older brother of Mungus. He has a transparent left arm and a transparent right leg.
- Maula – Maula is the queen of the Mammoth Tribe who has a transparent right leg. She is the mother of Mungus and Mottrot.

==== The Vulture Tribe ====
- Vardy – Vardy is the leader of the Vulture Tribe who has a transparent left arm. He is Sir Fangar's second-in-command and he was the one ordered to revive the feared IceBears. His strategy in battle is to wait.
- Voom Voom – Voom Voom is an upbeat member of the Vulture Tribe with a transparent right leg.
- Vornon – Vornon is a depressed vulture with a transparent left arm and a transparent right leg.
- Vultrix – Vultrix is a female member of the Vulture Tribe with a transparent right leg.

==== The Ice Bear Tribe ====
- Icebite – Icebite is the ferocious leader of the Ice Bear Tribe. He has a transparent left arm.
- Icepaw – Icepaw is an Ice Bear with a transparent right leg.
- Icerlot – Icerlot is an Ice Bear general with a transparent right leg and a transparent left arm.
- Iceklaw – Iceklaw is an Ice Bear with a transparent right leg.

=== Nomads ===
- Skinnet – Skinnet is a nomadic striped skunk who always seems to cause a stink – literally – at exactly the worst possible moment, which makes it extremely difficult for most other inhabitants of Chima to become friends with him. According to Skinnet's LEGO.com bio, it indicates that the rest of the Skunk Tribe has mysteriously disappeared. His stink turned to a more perfume-like smell after the great illumination.
- Furtivo – Furtivo is a mischievous nomadic red fox. He is one of the trophies in Sir Fanger's trophy room during season 3 and is later thawed out by Flinx.
- Dom de la Woosh – Dom de la Woosh is a nomadic peacock who is good at Speedorz racing.
- Lundor – Lundor is a Leopard Cat Guide who works for the Fire Tribes. He is a historian who keeps track of all events that have occurred in Chima and thinks that there are more leopards somewhere in the world.
- Plovar – Plovar is a small plover that is obsessed with dental hygiene and drops in to clean Cragger's teeth (and sometimes even Crooler's teeth) from time to time, He is the only animal not evolved by the Chi but is capable of speech. He is later captured and frozen in Sir Fangar's trophy room but escapes after using his mouth to free himself from the ice.
- Reegull – Reegull is a flightless Eagle/Raven hybrid as his father was an Eagle and his mother was a Raven (both kinds wouldn't accept him into their kind), he is skilled in manufacturing an artificial kind of Chi called "Chigull" which would give the same powers as regular Chi, but at the process makes them act like a chicken.

=== Legend Beasts ===
- Lion Legend Beast
- Crocodile Legend Beast
- Eagle Legend Beast – The Eagle Legend Beast is a large eagle. It also has two eggs.
- Wolf Legend Beast – The Wolf Legend Beast is believed to be the mother wolf that birthed all the existing wolves and gave them the "mother tooth" to "light the way in the darkness".
- Gorilla Legend Beast – The Gorilla Legend Beast – also known as "the legend dude" – is a brown gorilla.
- Raven Legend Beast – The Raven Legend Beast is a large raven. Like the Raven tribe residents, the Raven legend beast has a strange affinity to gold thins, and loves stealing.
- Rhinoceros Legend Beast – The Rhino Tribe males become smart when near this beast since the females are already smart.
- Bear Legend Beast – The Bear Tribe and the Bear Legend Beast can both telepathically communicate through dreams.
- Sabertooth Legend Beast – An implied existing beast from ancient Chima, believed that its fang is now Sir Fangar's sword.

== Episodes ==
=== Series overview ===
Season	Subtitle	Episodes	Originally released	
Season	Subtitle	Episodes	First released	Last released
1	The Power of the Chi	20	January 16, 2013	December 5, 2013
2	Quest for the Legend Beasts	6	March 15, 2014	April 19, 2014
3	Legend of the Fire Chi	15	August 9, 2014	November 22, 2014

=== Season 1: The Power of the Chi (2013) ===
No. overall	No. in season	Title	Directed by	Written by	Original air date	US viewers (millions)
1	1	"The Legend of Chima"	Peder Pedersen	John Derevlany	January 16, 2013	1.61
The young eagle Eris is flying peacefully when she is captured by the crocodile king Cragger who reveals to her that he is about to attack the Lion Temple to take possession of the Chi before wearing his crown as a mask. Lion prince Laval is preparing for his Age of Becoming Ceremony, where he will be able to use his Chi for the first time. When he is about to do so, however, the ceremony is interrupted by the attack of Cragger's crocodiles and their wolf and raven allies. Cragger steals Laval's Chi and runs away, chased by the latter on their Speedorz. Laval catches up and defeats him but Cragger's crown falls and Laval recognizes him. In a long flashback it is shown that Laval and Cragger used to be best friends despite their differences and that one day Cragger convinced Laval to sneak into the Lion Temple to see the Chi before their Age of Becoming. Once there, despite Laval's attempts to stop him, Cragger cannot resist the temptation to try the Chi but, being too young, he loses control and Lagravis, Laval's father and king of the lions, arrests him. This greatly enrages King Crominus and Queen Crunket, Cragger's parents; they refuse to believe what happened and accuse Laval. Both sides refuse to apologize and the crocodiles leave angrily. A few days later Cragger tries to steal Chi again but he is caught, the croc escapes and, scared, sends out a croc flair that attracts both the crocodile and lion armies. The two armies clash in the fangs, a region known for being very unstable and dangerous; in the heat of the battle a crevasse opens up right under Cragger's parents' vehicle. Cragger cuts the rope that kept Lagravis' vehicle tied to his parents' and asks for an orb of Chi to save them himself but Lagravis refuses and the king and queen fall into the Gorge of the Eternal Depth. It is shown that the king and queen of the crocodiles survived but they are stuck at the bottom of the Gorge. In the Crocodile Swamp, Cragger's sister Crooler tries to convince him that the lions are to blame for what happened and that his duty as king is to attack them.: Note –Like all season openers, this episode has no opening credits and the series logo and episode title appear at the end of the opening scene.
2	2	"The Great Story"	Peder Pedersen	John Derevlany	January 16, 2013	1.54
Continuing the flashback from the previous episode, Crooler makes Cragger smell a Persuader Plant, a hypnotizing flower, and orders him to attack the lions. At the Lion Temple Lagravis tells Laval once again the Great Story, the tale of how from simple animals the lions and other creatures of Chima drank the water of Chi, evolving, however some animals chose not to and left Chima, according to the Story these Legend Beasts will return when Chima needs them. Meanwhile, the monthly challenge for the special Golden Chi takes place, Laval wins, humiliating Worriz the wolf, who had attempted to cheat. Cragger shows up after the end of the competition and, angry for not being able to participate, attacks Eris, Laval chases him but he is trapped when Cragger lures him into the Falling Jungle. Laval is about to be defeated but the Eris and Gorzan the gorilla save him and send Cragger running. As Laval prepares for his Age of Becoming Ceremony, Cragger gathers the wolves and ravens to attack the lions, taking advantage of Worriz's anger and the Razar the raven's greed, offering his tribe trinkets and treasures. The flashback ends and the story returns to the battle at the Temple, where the eagle and gorilla tribes have arrived to help the lions. At the Forever Rock, Laval refuses to finish Cragger, who, infuriated, throws him into the water, leaving him to drown, and returns to his armies, that are still winning. Laval is saved, to his great surprise, by the Lion Legend Beast, who carries him back to the Temple. At the sight of the Legend Beast, the battle stops, only Cragger, still under the effect of the Persuader Plant, tries to attack, but he is easily defeated. Laval can finally use his Chi while Cragger and his allies are forced to run away.: Note –This episode does not begin with the summary of the previous one, unlike the following ones. It also has no opening and the series logo and episode title appear at the end of the opening scene.
3	3	"The Warrior Within"	Peder Pedersen	John Derevlany	March 27, 2013	1.45
At the Chi distribution, Cragger and Crooler show up demanding the Chi meant for their tribe, despite Laval not agreeing Lagravis insists on respecting the balance of Chima and gives Cragger their orbs. Laval is convinced that the crocodiles will use the Chi against them and decides to follow them and take it back. Surprisingly the crocodiles give up the Chi but shortly after, Cragger, still controlled by Crooler, denounces Laval in front of his tribe to convince them to attack the lions again. Meanwhile Laval meets Eris, who scolds him and convinces him to give the Chi back. Since this would derail Crooler's plan Cragger provokes Laval to the point that the lion shouts loud that the crocodile tribe will never have Chi again. The crocodiles attack Laval who is forced to run away. Cornered, Laval decides to throw the Chi into the Gorge of Eternal Depth. Before he too can be thrown in by the angry crocodiles, he is saved by Eris. However, Eris's plane is shot down by the crocodiles. Meanwhile, Gorzan found a small flower on the main road and blocked the way for everyone, including the ravens and wolves that Cragger called to help him. Gorzan even fights Worriz in order to protect the flower. Laval gets to the Outlands border, hoping that the Lion Legend Beast will come to help him, but just when he thinks he's seeing it, Cragger and his crocodiles surround him. Eris, who called for reinforcements from the lions and eagles, saves Laval once again. Cragger retreats, leaving Laval to wonder whether the Legend Beast didn't help him because he wants him to defeat Cragger with his own strength or because he threw away the Chi. Just then, an earthquake occurs, a sign that Chima's balance is disturbed. In the final scene, Eris and Laval, who decided to keep what he did with the crocodiles' Chi a secret, reunite with Gorzan, who understood that the road is not the right place for a flower and moved it to a hill.: Note –This episode is the first to contain the summary of the previous ones, made by Lagravis, and the theme song, with the series logo and the episode title presented over a blue background at the end. It is also the only episode in the entire series to contain a mid-credits scene: Rogon, Runk and Rukus get back on the road after they got lost during the events of the episode, but when they see that the flower is not there, they bellieve they are in the wrong place and get lost again.
4	4	"The Joyride"	Peder Pedersen	John Derevlany	July 17, 2013	1.01
Laval is cleaning the map room when Eris visits him and convinces him to take a tour of the most beautiful places in Chima while Lagravis is with the rhinoceros tribe to convince them to sign a treaty against the crocodiles. Once they reach the top of the Spiral Mountain, Laval forgets the parking brake and his father's tank falls from the Mountain. Meanwhile Lagravis has to deal with the stupidity of the rhinoceroses and he is forced to give up on the treaty. Eris and Laval go to the beaver tribe, famously skilled fixers, hoping to bring the tank back to the Temple before Lagravis' return. At the beavers' village, they find out that the tribe is already working on a project: a dam to divert the water of the Chi into the Crocodile Swamp. While Lagravis is intercepted on his way back by the wolves, Eris and Laval convince the beavers to go repair the tank while they battle Cragger and Crooler to break down the dam. Cragger defeats Laval but, when he Chis Up to finish him off, Cragger himself causes the collapse of the dam, already weakened by Eris. The water overwhelms Laval who wakes up in his room with Eris who explains to him that everything has been fixed but the beavers, once they finished repairing the tank, installed wings on it, thus allowing Lagravis to figure out what happened.
5	5	"Market Day"	Peder Pedersen	John Derevlany	July 24, 2013	1.19
It's the day of the Golden Chi race and the Chima tribes gather at the Lion Temple for the market. Laval and Eris take a walk around the stands, they meet Skinnet the skunk and argue with Razar because the ravens are selling stolen goods. At the end of the tour Laval discovers that his Speedorz, made of tribe stones fallen from Mount Cavora, has been stolen and so he goes to the ravens to get it back, finding out that they repainted it. The ravens refuse to admit that the Speedorz is Laval's and, after an argument, Eris convinces Laval to offer something in exchange, the two come up with a plan to pay for the Speedorz with a box of nothing, being the only thing the ravens don't have. The ravens accept, knowing that they can easily sell the box to the rhinos and Laval prepares for the race. Just before the start, however, it is revealeded that the Golden Chi has been stolen and replaced with a fake. Laval recognizes the fake Golden Chi paint as the same one on his Speedorz and sets off in pursuit of the ravens. Once he catches up, the ravens agree to return the Golden Chi and wash Laval's Speedorz, explaining that they used it as a distraction on Cragger's orders, at that moment the crocodile arrives. Cragger wants to take the Golden Chi but the arrival of the other tribes, also angry for the theft, force him to give up. The race can finally begin with Cragger who participates to try and win the Golden Chi anyway. In the final stretch Worriz throws Laval off the track, revealing that he was paid by Crooler. Cragger is convinced that he has already won, but Worriz explains that the agreement was only to not let the lion win and throws him out too, winning the race. Back in the Crocodile Swamp Crooler presents Cragger with a plan to attack Eagle Spire.
6	6	"Attack on Eagle Spire"	Peder Pedersen	John Derevlany	July 31, 2013	1.03
Eris took Laval to visit Eagle Spire, impossible to reach unless you can fly. Cragger and Crooler are preparing an attack using a bellow plant, which would allow their soldiers to reach the Spire and surprise the eagles. However, the crocodiles are afraid to use the plant because it is very unstable. Crooler then sends the raven Ripnik to steal the Mother Tooth, a fang left to the wolves by their Legend Beast and their most sacred relic, and instructs him to frame the eagles. Mad with rage, the wolves ask for Cragger's help to attack the eagles since they only have one helicopter and Cragger provides them with the bellow plant. The next morning, Eris and Laval visit the Wolf Camp to investigate the howls of the previous night but they find it empty and get attacked by the puppy Wonald, who tells them of the attack. At the Spire the eagles are taken by surprise but Laval and Eris come to their rescue and Laval calls his father for reinforcements. Since the wolves destroyed the eagles' planes, Laval pays the ravens to take the lions to the Spire. The ravens agree, but they get paid by the wolves to bring the lions in an ambush. Laval and Eris see Ripnik steal the Mother Tooth from Cragger, wanting to sell it back to the wolves, and they chase him. Meanwhile the ravens find out Cragger and Crooler's plan to pull down the Spire with their chains to eliminate the eagles, lions and wolves in one fell swoop and, worried they will lose their customers, they break the chains, saving the tribes. The wolves want to keep on fighting but Laval and Eris convince Ripnik to return the Tooth, threatening to reveal to the wolves that he was the thief. With the "miraculous" reappearance of the Tooth, the wolves retreat and the battle ends.
7	7	"The Hundred-Year Moon"	Peder Pedersen	John Derevlany	August 7, 2013	1.00
The eagles discover that the Hundred-Year Moon is approaching, an event where every one hundred years the moon turns purple and affects the wolves, making them stronger, fiercer, and wilder. Worried, the lions ask the wolves to warn the tribes of Chima to stay hidden that night. Upon learning of the Moon, Crooler kidnaps the gorilla cub G'loona and chains her to the Forever Rock, hoping that the wolves will find her and anyone who tries to save her. Meanwhile, Skinnet refuses to barricade himself with the lions, telling because a legend says the purple moon can turn his stench into a perfume that calms the wolves. The Hundred-Year Moon begins and the wolves roam Chima, destroying everything on their path. Gorzan turns up at the Lion Temple and asks Laval to help him find G'loona, they are joined by Eris. As soon as they come out the wolves attack them and destroy their vehicles. Skinnet arrives just in time to save them with his scent. Meanwhile G'loona is found by Wonald, who is a vegetarian and has been attracted by the scent of her bananas, G'loona then uses his hunger and sense of smell to have him free her and drag her to the Gorilla Forest, where the entire tribe went out to look for her, running into the wolves. G'loona is greeted by Laval, Eris and Skinnet who try to calm Wonald by giving him all the bananas they have. The gorillas are forced to retreat but luckily the wolves slip on the banana peels thrown by Wonald. Dawn arrives and the wolves return to normal. Unfortunately Skinnet does not realize in time that the Hundred-Year Moon is over and, thinking that he still smells good and has to stop the wolves, he stinks up the entire Forest.
8	8	"The Biggest Race of All"	Peder Pedersen	John Derevlany	August 14, 2013	1.22
It's once again time to compete for the Golden Chi and the orb of the month turns out to be particularly large and powerful, so much that Crooler is already planning to cheat to have her brother win. Just before the race, Laval notices that his Speedorz needs repairs, but he forgets about it when he discovers that among the racers there will be Dom de la Woosh, an old peacock and former Speedorz champion who was Laval and Cragger's childhood idol. When Laval tries to approach Cragger he denies remembering their friendship, but soon after Laval sees him whispering something to Dom de la Woosh. The race begins and Laval is left behind due to his broken Speedorz. Having no choice, Laval decides to Chi Up and quickly reaches the lead, but he loses control and ends up in a pool of water that Crooler filled with piranhas. Laval is saved by a mysterious masked racer who, without a word, easily wins the race and is nicknamed Shadowind by the announcer Equila. Cragger tries to follow Shadowind to find out who he is, being followed in turn by Laval and Eris, but the mysterious racer loses all three. Before leaving, Cragger lets out a phrase that makes Laval understand that he remembers their friendship, which fills the lion with hope. On the way back, Laval and Eris meet Dom de la Woosh who confesses that he was paid by Cragger to distract the other racers and make him win and that he is sorry. Before he leaves, the peacock tells the lion that without Shadowind Laval would have won.
9	9	"Gorillas Gone Wild"	Peder Pedersen	John Derevlany	August 28, 2013	0.93
The gorillas are celebrating the growth of the Tower Flower, a tree-sized flower that blooms only once in a gorilla's lifetime. Cragger arrives and, mistaking the flower's stem for a tree trunk, he cuts it down for practice. The enraged gorillas attack and chase him. G'loona arrives at the Lion Temple and asks Laval and his father for their and the eagles' help against the crocodiles, whom the gorillas want to attack in their own Swamp. The crocodiles are taken by surprise so Crooler takes control, scolding his brother for his mistakes. Crooler lures the gorillas into a trap by making them get stuck in the mud. Before the crocodiles can finish off the gorillas however, the lions arrive and lure the crocodiles away, but they are led into a trap themselves. Meanwhile Laval and the eagles free the gorillas and together they rescue the lionsa and send the crocodiles on the top of the very tall swamp trees. The battle seems won but Cragger shoots down Eris's plane with Laval on it and the lion falls into the Swamp. Laval avoids the water by holding on to some bellow plants but Cragger pops them one by one. Laval falls but it turns out he's on a shallow and so he defeats Cragger. The gorillas celebrate the victory with their allies while Cragger, annoyed by the way Crooler treated him, decides to leave her in the tree where she is stuck as punishment.
10	10	"Foxtrot" "Anarchy at the Races"	Peder Pedersen	John Derevlany	September 4, 2013	1.28
Laval witnesses Cragger's attempt to capture Shadowind, and its spectacular failure. Crooler, resigned to her brother's incompetence, asks for the wolves' help. Worriz explains her that the wolves are bound by the Pledge of the Pack, a document in which the wolves promised to always serve the crocodile king, created after King Crominus taught the wolves the strength of unity and convinced them to form a pack. Crooler then offers to destroy the Pledge in exchange for the wolves' help. Worriz accepts. On the day of the Golden Chi race, Furtivo the fox, hired by Worriz, tells everyone that the other tribes are planning to cheat, creating a distrustful and competitive atmosphere. Furtivo also discovers that the rhinoceros Rogon is in love with Eris. When the race begins, convinced by the gossip, the tribes cheat and accuse each other of cheating first. Soon the race turns into a collective brawl. Shadowind wins again and leaves with the Golden Chi while Lagravis orders the temple guards to restore order. With the Temple empty, Crooler and the wolves enter and start stealing all the Chi, but before they can escape through a hole they blasted in the walls they are caught by Cragger. The wolves are about to attack him, but Laval, Eris and Rogon arrive and help the crocodile. Outnumbered, Worriz calls for help from Windra, who shoots at Eris from her wolfcopter, but Rogon takes the shot instead. Cragger tries to stop Worriz from escaping, but he is thrown out of the wolfcopter. Laval is then faced with a choice between saving Cragger or stopping Crooler and the wolves from escaping with the stolen Chi, he chooses his former friend. Rogon asks for a kiss from Eris but, after receiving it, he reveals that he is not hurt, which irritates the eagle. At the Gorge of Eternal Depth, a guilt-ridden Crooler throws away the Pledge as agreed. The final scene shows a shadowy figure, apparently a crocodile, picking up the Pledge at the bottom of the Gorge.
11	11	"The Chi Jackers"	Peder Pedersen	John Derevlany	September 11, 2013	1.25
After what happened, the lions banned gatherings near their temple, forcing the tribes to come and take their Chi in turns. At the swamp, Crooler discovers that her Persuader Plant is rotten and Cragger, free from her control, kicks her out. Meanwhile, the wolves take advantage of the situation to intercept the various tribes returning home with their Chi and rob them. When the lions learn of this, they organize an escort for the ravens, but the wolves take advantage of their absence, and the breach in their walls, to attack the temple and empty the Chi pool. The lions now haven't got enough Chi to even activate their weapons, and are therefore vulnerable to another attack. Meanwhile, the imbalance brought by the wolves begins to cause earthquakes. Despite all this, Lagravis refuses his son's proposal to keep some extra Chi to fight the wolves, reiterating once again the importance of maintaining balance. Laval sees Shadowind and follows him to the wolf camp, where the mysterious racer gives Laval a Golden Chi and distracts the wolves to give the lion enough time to use it to repair the temple walls. The lions can now afford to escort the tribes, but the wolves attack the escort, stealing the bears' Chi again. Laval then comes up with the idea of transporting the Chi by air, with the help of the eagles, but the wolves attack them again using cannons and their helicopter. After a long battle, Eris shoots Windra down, but a shot from one of the cannons knocks the Chi off the plane, but fortunately it ends up in the hands of the bear Bladvic, for whom it was intended.
12	12	"Balancing Act"	Peder Pedersen	John Derevlany	September 18, 2013	1.09
Laval and the eagles keep delivering Chi to the tribes, but Chima's imbalance causes a storm that make Eris' plane crash, when the dust clears, Laval realizes that he and Eris are precariously hanging over the Gorge of Eternal Depth. Meanwhile Crooler tries to see Cragger after collecting some new Persuader Plants, but the guards deny her entry and confiscate the flowers. She then tries to join forces with Worriz, but is rejected. Laval tries to retrieve the Chi by descending into the Gorge with a gorilla rope brought by Gorzan, but when he is about to recover the Chi another storm arrives, Eris' plane falls and Gorzan loses his grip on the rope. At the wolf camp Crooler takes advantage of a storm to steal all their Chi and runs away chased by the entire pack. Laval managed not to fall in the Gorge and, having reached the Chi, he uses an orb to power up and climb to the top. Crooler sends out a croc flair, meanwhile Cragger discovers the Plants confiscated by his guards and smells one by mistake. Crooler gets to the swamp but the wolves reach her and take back the Chi. Cragger, under the effect of the Plant again, promises to punish them. Laval, Eris and Gorzan are on their way to deliver the last package of Chi when they encounter the entire wolf tribe. Luckily they escape and the wolves are forced to give up the chase when they are attacked by the crocodiles. Seeing this Laval wants to return to help Cragger but his friends do not agree and go away. After a short battle that the wolves easily win, the entire crocodile tribe is captured.
13	13	"Crocodile Tears"	Peder Pedersen	John Derevlany	September 25, 2013	0.98
The wolves imprisoned all the crocodiles except Crooler in their camp. Laval tries to convince his father to free them, but Lagravis says that they don't have enough Chi and need the other tribes support, but they probably won't want to help the crocodiles. Laval and Eris then go to the Ravens' junkyard, where they have been helding clandestine Speedorz races ever since the official ones were banned. The lion hopes to find Shadowind and convince him to help them. Razar offers to help them if they beat him in a race. Crooler shows up at wolf camp and informs the tribe that the elders of Chima instructed Skinnet to observe how the crocodiles are treated to decide whether or not to save them. Since their vehicles were damaged during the battle, the wolves cannot withstand an attack and decide to give the crocodiles whatever they ask for to show that they treat them well, at least for now. The crocodiles immediately take advantage of this by asking for fine food, cold drinks, and even puppet shows. At the junkyard, Laval wins the race and Razar, who made a lot of money thanks to the lion's victory, introduces him to a suspiciously short and shabby Shadowind, Eris thinks it might be a trick but Laval doesn't listen to her, even when "Shadowind" crashes attracting all the wolves the lion believes that he did it on purpose to provide a distraction for the other two. The wolves in the meantime can no longer stand the crocodiles' absurd demands and, when they smell Laval and Eris approaching, decide to pretend to be weak so they can free the prisoners. Laval and Eris easily reach the cages and free the crocodiles, who are not at all happy but follow them nevertheless. The next day Razar receives a visit from the "Shadowind" he had introduced to Eris and Laval, that turns out to be Furtivo, who also had never driven a Speedorz before but agreed to pretend to be the mysterious racer for a share of the profits.
14	14	"Fake Chi, Real Trouble"	Peder Pedersen	John Derevlany	October 2, 2013	0.97
Crooler has no more Plants to control her brother and tries to get one from Razar, who directs her to a half-eagle, half-raven alchemist named Reegull. Reegull says he can help her but, instead of the flower, he offers her a special artificial Chi he created in a lab. Crooler is thrilled but when Cragger finds out about it he decides to give it to the various tribes to make up for what he did, instead of using it to conquer Chima as she hoped. Cragger then begins a tour of Chima throwing Chi to the tribes he meets along the way, except for the wolves. The last stop on the tour is the ravens' junkyard, but there Razar reveals that those orbs are called "Reegul's Chigull" because after a while, those who use them begin to behave like chickens trying to fly. Cragger returns to Reegull who reveals that this was his plan all along: since he was never able to fly as a child and was excluded from all the tribes due to his hybrid condition, he created his Chi orbs to make the inhabitants of Chima like him. Meanwhile Laval is delivering the regular Chi, after defending it from the wolves' attacks, and discovers what Cragger is doing, also noticing that the tribes are behaving like chickens. Cragger tries to get rid of the remaining false Chi but is interrupted by Laval, while the crocodile tries to explain the two are captured by the wolves, who find the Chi and decide to use it to attack the lions. The lion and the crocodile, about to warn them, choose to pretend to be scared and let them do it instead. The wolves reach the temple walls just in time to start clutching, getting defeated and humiliated. In the final scene Laval and Cragger give Reegull some bellow plants to allow him to fly, initially the hybrid is happy, but almost immediately the plants explode.
15	15	"Ravens vs. Eagles"	Peder Pedersen	John Derevlany	October 9, 2013	1.12
Eris confesses in her journal that she has a crush on Rogon, and then hides the book in the great library of the eagles. At the raven junkyard, Razar learns from Eglor that on the eagle spire everything belongs to everyone and anyone can take anything. Shortly afterward, Razar and the ravens show up at the spire and begin taking everything they can. Laval and Cragger are becoming friends again, much to Crooler's displeasure. She then goes to Gorzan with a rotten Persuader Plant to ask the gorilla for help. Gorzan refuses to help her, so Crooler throws the flower into the fire in front of his eyes. This produces a strange mist that puts Crooler to sleep, and she dreams to be very powerful and that it is her destiny to rule all of Chima. At the spire the eagles try to stop the ravens, but they trick them and barricade themselves inside their library. Eris points out that they won't be able to sell anything to anyone from there, and that anyone can use their Speedorz track for free in the meantime. The ravens then decide to leave, except Razar, who refuses because he didn't make a profit. When Eris arrives, the raven reveals that he found her journal and blackmails her. Eris attacks him and the two fly away from the spire. In one of the raven shops, Ripnik realizes that no one is interested in buying the eagles' gadgets and leaves everything, at that moment Crooler arrives and finds a book about her Plant that explains that the roots are more powerful than the Plant itself if burned. During the episode, Laval and Cragger gathered all their friends from the various tribes on the top of spiral mountain. When Eris and Razar also crash there, the raven gives the eagle her journal back in exchange for the promise not to reveal to anyone that a whole day passed without him being able to earn anything. The two join the others and all together decide to sign a new peace treaty between the tribes, the Treaty of Friendship.
16	16	"Reunion Gone Wrong"	Peder Pedersen	John Derevlany	October 16, 2013	1.05
Laval, Cragger, Eris, Worriz, Gorzan, Razar, Rogon, and Bladvic gather at the Forever Rock to discuss the peace treaty, with Crooler serving drinks and Skinnet acting as a neutral mediator. Just as they are about to sign, Crooler throws the roots of the Persuader Plant into the fire, releasing the fog of destiny. The 8 representatives fall asleep and have a shared dream in which they all feel they discovered their destiny, Cragger feels that his is to dominate Chima and for this he attacks Laval. When Cragger kicks the lion away, Laval's real body also ends up in the water, fortunately Skinnet, who turns out to be immune to the fog, saves him. Skinnet is actually depressed because it seems like he has no destiny. The two try to pull the others out as well, but fail. When he feels a slight earthquake, Laval realizes that the Chi pool is producing a new Golden Chi and that this is the solution to their problem. So he goes to the temple and, knowing that the rules do not allow anyone to take a Golden Chi without winning it, he steals it, convincing his father to let him flee. Cragger is about to crash everyone else in the fog when Laval arrives and wakes everyone up just in time. Once outside the fog, Cragger's eyes have turned red and he seems to be back to how he was when Crooler controlled him. He leaves promising to fulfill his destiny. Lagravis convinces the elder lions not to punish Laval for stealing the Golden Chi but he confesses that he felt that his destiny is to be a great leader, and so decided to accept the punishment, which turns out to be exile. At the crocodile swamp, Cragger Crooler imprisons, wanting to rule Chima alone. Soon after, the swamp and much of Chima are invaded by the stench of Skinnet, who decided to accept his destiny, which is to be exactly what he is.
17	17	"Laval in Exile"	Peder Pedersen	John Derevlany	October 23, 2013	1.17
Laval has been sentenced to exile. This means that he will wander Chima without anyone being able to speak to him for the rest of his life. Before leaving, he says goodbye to his father and the friends who came to say farewell to him. After passing through the various tribes, Laval retreats to the top of spiral mountain, where he meets Skinnet and the plover Plovar, who decide to become his companions in exile. However, Laval cannot stand that the two treat it like a game and tries to walk away. Meanwhile, Cragger takes advantage of Laval's absence and kidnaps Lagravis, leaving the lion tribe without a leader. Laval arrives at the fangs where he meets Shadowind. The mysterious racer gives Laval the Pledge of the Pack. Skinnet recognizes the sap on the paper and says that it comes from the Outlands, where only he can go since his "special gift" allows him to overcome the carnivorous plants that surround Chima. Plovar goes to the crocodile swamp to clean Cragger's teeth, but the crocodile chases him away and cuts off his tail feathers. Lagravis discovers that he is imprisoned next to Crooler, who tells him that she was actually born before Cragger, but she is the only one who remembers it and everyone else therefore believes that her Brother is the heir to the throne. For this reason, her parents always neglected her, thus deciding to use her brother as a puppet to rule not only over the crocodiles but all of Chima. Laval is informed by Plovar of his father's capture and decides to save him. He then goes to Cragger and offers him in exchange the Pledge of the Pack, on which there has been added a message that seems to come from the croc's parents. For a moment, Cragger's eyes turn back and he agrees to release Lagravis. Having seen that the crocodiles are preparing to attack the lion temple again, Laval decides to accept his father's offer to come home with him, saying however that one day he will have to return to exile.: Note -The sequence of images during which Laval passes by to greet the various tribes is accompanied by the song Horizon, by the same band that composed the theme song for the series.
18	18	"The Black Cloud"	Peder Pedersen	John Derevlany	October 30, 2013	0.98
A mysterious black cloud appeared out of nowhere is flying around Mount Cavora. When the eagles try to get close, the cloud attacks them but gets distracted and goes to follow Shadowind instead. Eris lands and tells Laval that she didn't understand if the cloud was chasing the racer or if he was leading it. Cragger overhears the conversation and learns from Crug and Crawley that it was Shadowind who gave Laval the Pledge of the Pack and that the two learned about it from Plovar. Believing that Shadowind is the key to finding his parents, Cragger asks for Plovar's help but the plover, still angry about the loss of his feathers, demands a day of obedience from the crocodile in exchange. Meanwhile Laval and Eris try to investigate the black cloud, but to no avail. They then decide to follow Shadowind's tracks, which lead them to the border with the Outlands. There they meet Cragger who, after being humiliated by Plovar one too many times cut off his tail feathers again. With the arrival of the two Cragger realizes that Plovar fooled him and cannot take him to Shadowind. He then orders Crug and Crawley to go to the Outlands but the two are immediately spat back by the carnivorous plants of the border. Suddenly the black cloud reappears and heads towards Mount Cavora. Laval is increasingly worried that the cloud could damage the only source of Chi in all of Chima and gathers all the tribes in front of the lion temple to fight it. Much to Lagravis' surprise, Cragger's crocodiles, the wolves and the ravens also show up. The tribes open fire on the black cloud, which retreats towards the Outlands. While the tribes are celebrating, some waterfalls on Mount Cavora stop giving Chi water.
19	19	"Chima Falls"	Peder Pedersen	John Derevlany	November 6, 2013	0.94
The tribes of Chima are all celebrating their victory against the black cloud. Even Cragger's eyes turn back normal, but they become red again when everyone notices that the waterfalls of Mount Cavora dried up. Cragger then accuses Laval of destroying Chima, that without Chi is doomed, and turns all the tribes against the lion. A sudden earthquake, however, allows the lions to retreat in their temple while the other tribes return to their homes. After flying in search of the black cloud, the eagles inform the lions that they noticed many wolves in the crocodile swamp. Laval and Eris go spy and see Cragger showing the tribe the Pledge of the Pack as proof of his destiny. Impressed, since nothing ever returned from the Gorge of Eternal Depth, the wolves agree to help the crocodiles attack the lions. Having realized that they need allies, Laval and Eris secure the friendship of the gorillas and the bears. They also try with the rhinos, but discover that Cragger anticipated them by buying the tribe with rocks. Not even Eris' attempts to reason with Rogon can change things. The last stop of the two is the ravens' junkyard, but they are not at home, so Laval leaves them a message. Back at the lion temple, Laval and Eris see raven planes fly above them and feel the earth shaking. They think it is another earthquake and that the ravens are answering to their message but they are wrong. The ravens in fact attack them and the earth shaking is due to the tribes of crocodiles, wolves and rhinos marching towards the lion temple. The final battle for Chima has begun.
20	20	"For Chima!"	Peder Pedersen	John Derevlany	December 5, 2013	1.30
Laval and Eris are running towards the lion temple chased by Cragger's armies. They get rescued at the last minute by the lions who came to defend their prince. Laval reaches the temple and calls the allied tribes. However, Cragger foresaw this and sends the ravens and the rhinos to intercept the eagles and the gorillas respectively. Rogon instead decides to go to Eris to fight alongside her. Cragger orders the crocodiles and the wolves to use all their last Chi orbs at the same time. The result is so devastating that it wipes out the lions' defenses. At this point Cragger directly attacks Laval to prevent him from closing the drawbridge that separates the walls from the temple. After a long duel, the drawbridge retreats under the feet of the two, who fall. During the fall, Laval pushes Cragger on top of him, acting as his shield. This gesture brings Cragger back to his senses once and for all. The crocodile, repentant, cries for the loss of his friend. The lions organize a last desperate attack against the enemies. Cragger orders his armies to wait for him and sneaks into Laval's room, where he discovers a letter from his friend explaining that he faked his death because he noticed Shadowind beckoning him and so went with him. In the letter Laval recommends never losing hope, filling Cragger's heart with it. When the lions' last attack is defeated, Cragger arrives just in time to stop his armies and see Laval's arrival. To everyone's surprise, the lion shows up on the Crocodile Legend Beast, and with him is Queen Crunket, Cragger's mother. In front of the assembled tribes, Queen Crunket reveals that the black cloud is the product of new tribes from the Outlands who have only blocked the falls for now, but plan to steal all the Chi, and that they imprisoned not only King Crominus but also all the other Legend Beasts. That evening, the 8 young leaders of Chima gather to prepare for departure: they will all go together to the Outlands to free the Legend Beasts and save Chima!

=== Season 2: Quest for the Legend Beasts (2014) ===
No. overall	No. in season	Title	Directed by	Written by	Original air date	US viewers (millions)
21	1	"Into the Outlands"	Peder Pedersen	John Derevlany	March 15, 2014	0.88
Laval, Cragger, Eris, Worriz, Gorzan, Razar, Rogon, and Bladvic prepare to leave for the Outlands and say goodbye to their families. Queen Crunket tells them how, when she and King Crominus were trapped at the bottom of the Gorge of Eternal Depth, Chi fell from the sky, but it ended up among the scorpions, spiders, and bats, who evolved and captured the royal couple. The new tribes led them through caves that brought them to the Outlands. However, when the king and queen heard their plans to block the waterfalls and steal all the Chi, they tried to escape. Crominus was recaptured while Crunket was saved by the Crocodile Legend Beast and Shadowind. Laval realizes that the Chi Crunket told them about is that that he threw away in the first season, but decides not to tell the others. The group takes off but, even with the help of Skinnet's bottled stinks, they have trouble getting through the carnivorous plants surrounding Chima. Laval and Gorzan get cornered, but they are saved at the last moment by Rogon's vehicle, the rhino however says that he wasn't driving. After getting past the carnivorous plants, the 8 protagonists enter the Outlands and are immediately attacked by the black cloud, which turns out to be the bat tribe. While trying to run, they realize that they are on a Speedorz track and use their experience to escape. At the end of the track they find a mysterious house from which a figure emerges. The figure turns out to be a lion named Lavertus, who was exiled from Chima years ago and has been living in the Outlands ever since. Lavertus also seems to know the Crocodile Legend Beast. Everyone is excited to meet a native of Chima and they decide to use Lavertus' house as a base, also because the lion has a map with the locations of the Legend Beasts. Only Eris is suspicious, as Lavertus is acting strangely and does not allow anyone to look into a room from which a mysterious golden light comes. That night while everyone is asleep, Lavertus opens the mysterious door revealing a room full of Golden Chi.: Note – As in all season openings, this episode has no opening credits and the series logo and episode title appear at the end of the opening scene.
22	2	"A Tangled Web"	Peder Pedersen	John Derevlany	March 22, 2014	1.46
The black cloud returns to Chima to steal the Chi but the tribes make the thieves fall into the crocodile swamp. In the Outlands the 8 protagonists make their way through the carnivorous plants thanks to Rogon's vehicle, which once again he says he wasn't driving. Rogon explains that he left the autopilot on, but the others discover that the autopilot is just a rock. The group arrives at the spiders' lair, where the Gorilla and Rhino Legend Beasts are imprisoned. Due to the proximity of his Legend Beast, Rogon becomes very smart and he realizes that the one driving his vehicle so far is Rinona, a female Rhino who hid on his vehicle to help him. Hearing this, Eris becomes jealous. In Chima, the crocodiles led by Queen Crunket and Crooler, who was freed by her mother, are recovering the Chi when they are attacked by General Sparracon and the other spiders who fell with the orbs. The spiders tie up the crocodiles and they are about to sink them when Shadowind, who Sparracon recognizes, intervenes. The mysterious racer easily captures the spiders and frees Queen Crunket. Before he leaves, the queen tells Shadowind that she feels like she knows him. The recovered Chi is brought to the tribes, who use it to drive away the black cloud again. While Rogon makes complicated calculations to save his Legend Beast, the others disguise his vehicle as a giant fly to distract the spiders. Thanks to this trick and Rogon's idea, the two Legend Beasts are freed and Rogon also hits the spider queen Spynlin, breaking her tooth. The now 9 heroes return to Lavertus, who is once again acting very strangely. In the final scene, the Raven Legend Beast is seen flying over the house.
23	3	"The Legend Thief"	Peder Pedersen	John Derevlany	March 29, 2014	1.26
The 9 heroes are awakened by Lavertus's screams. Someone robbed him. Lavertus refuses to reveal what was stolen and threatens to kick the group out if the thief doesn't come out. Curious, Razar enters the mysterious room and to everyone's surprise they find Shadowind's helmet-mask. In Chima Crooler proposes an alliance to the captive spiders but they break free and attack her. In the Outlands the group faces Lavertus, who admits to being Shadowind and says he discovered that the thief is actually the Raven Legend Beast. Despite everything, Lavertus still refuses to help the heroes. Laval issues a challenge then, Lavertus will help them if they beat him in a Speedorz race. Lavertus is convinced he will win easily but the heroes take turns driving the Speedorz to each tackle a section of the track during the race and thus they manage to beat him. Meanwhile Sparracon and his spiders returned to the Outlands and brought with them Plovar, who Queen Spynlin wants to use for his knowledge of teeth to repair hers. Lavertus leads the group to the scorpion cave. While the others create a diversion, the two lions and Razar, carrying a mysterious secret weapon, enter and discover that the scorpion king Scorm is using his hypnotic venom to control the Raven Legend Beast. Razar then reveals that the secret weapon is a bunch of cans full of gold paint, which the three spread on all the scorpions. Seeing all that gold, the Raven Legend Beast breaks free of Scorm's control and "steals" the scorpions, defeating them. After the heroes leave, Scorm examines the Speedorz that Razar left behind and, deducing the origin of the wheel stones, he sends the spiders and bats to pickaxe Mount Cavora. Since they need to save Chi, Lagravis and the Chima tribes cannot intervene.
24	4	"The Eagle and the Bear"	Peder Pedersen	John Derevlany	April 5, 2014	1.12
Eris finds the Eagle Legend Beast and discovers that the bats stole her eggs and kidnapped the Bear Legend Beast and placed them on the opposing ends of a precariously positioned rock. Laval wakes Bladvic to explain the situation but the bear says he already knows everything and that the solution is in the secret garage. Lavertus admits that he does indeed have a garage and reveals that he built a helicopter. Laval then suggests that they replace the eggs with him and Bladvic, who can then reach the Bear Legend Beast in the center of the rock and leave together. While they put their plan into action, Worriz, frustrated by the absence of his Legend Beast, decides to stay behind and reveals to Rinona that he has the Mother Tooth with him, which according to legend should light the way to the Wolf Legend Beast, but all his attempts fail. Laval meanwhile doesn't know how to convince the Bear Legend Beast to move but Bladvic falls asleep and shows that bears are able to communicate in dreams. The plan is working but Lavertus accidentally wakes the bears and the rock falls, with the 3 animals on it. Having no other choice Rogon floods the space below. Laval nearly drowns but he is saved by Cragger. As they are about to leave, the Crawlers arrive on their new Speedorz, which they built using the eggs and the Bear Legend Beast as a distraction, and they trap Laval, Bladvic and his Legend Beast. Laval tries to power up but his Chi ends up in the hands of Bladvic, who uses it but immediately falls asleep along with the Bear Legend Beast. Fortunately, the two's enhanced snoring causes a landslide that scares the enemies away. In the last scene, Scorm orders Spynlin to gather all her forces in the scorpion cave, along with the Wolf Legend Beast and King Crominus, to lure the heroes into a trap.
25	5	"Tooth or Consequences"	Peder Pedersen	John Derevlany	April 12, 2014	1.09
During the night Cragger dreams of his father and wakes up to find Lavertus watching him. Cragger notices that Lavertus has a scarf that belonged to his mother when she was young and asks for an explanation but Lavertus avoids the question. Cragger then decides to go out to look for his father. Shortly after, Worriz also wakes up because the Mother Tooth is glowing, the wolf realizes that his Legend Beast is close and goes out to look, bumping into Cragger. The two see the Wolf Legend Beast hypnotized by Scorm's poison dragging a cage with King Crominus inside. Unfortunately Plovar sees them and reveals their presence to the Crawlers, who capture them. Cragger and his father are happy to be together again, but Crominus' mood changes as soon as he hears Lavertus' name and he says he has something to confess to his son. The next morning the rest of the group discovers what happened and they ask Lavertus to help them save their friends, but Lavertus refuses as soon as he hears Crominus' name. The others then, except Rinona, attack the scorpion cave and free Cragger, Worriz, Crominus and the Wolf Legend Beast. Worriz gives his Legend Beast its Tooth back and frees her from the poison, but as they attempt to leave the 9 and Plovar realize that they have fallen into a trap. Laval discovers that the Lion Legend Beast is in a cave nearby and wants to go and save him, but they are stuck. Cragger reveals to the Crawlers that the Chi that created them was thrown down into the Gorge of Eternal Depth by Laval hoping that they will let them pass, but the Crawlers do not believe him. The other heroes, hearing this, get mad at Laval and refuse to follow him to rescue his Legend Beast. Laval then rushes alone towards the cave from which the roars are coming and just as he reaches the entrance the Crawlers collapse it.
26	6	"This May Sting a Bit"	Peder Pedersen	John Derevlany	April 19, 2014	1.26
At Lavertus' house, the lion tells Rinona his story: when he was young, he was in love with Crunket, but Crominus used a Persuader Plant on him to make him steal some Chi, so to have him exiled and marry the princess. Lavertus understood that if he had denounced Crominus, there would have been a war between their tribes, so he accepted the exile. Rinona then convinces Lavertus to save Crominus to prove that he is better than him. Meanwhile, in the scorpion cave, Laval wakes up in a cave where his Legend Beast is imprisoned on a rock surrounded by water. The lion wants to use his Chi, but the Lion Legend Beast communicates with him telling him to use his "inner Chi". Laval then learns how to swim and he teaches it to the Legend Beast, freeing it. Just outside the cave the other heroes are fighting. Plovar tricks Spynlin and traps her in the mud along with her warriors. Rogon uses his intelligence and knowledge of rocks to defeat their enemies. Seeing this Scorm begins to collapse the exits of the cave to trap the heroes along with the Crawlers. When only one exit remains Rinona, who Rogon reveals to be his sister much to Eris' relief, and Lavertus arrive, with all of the latter's Golden Chi which he uses to stabilize the cave. Lavertus reveals to Laval that he is Lagravis' brother and therefore his uncle before sending everyone out of the cave, sacrificing himself to allow them to get out. Once outside the group sees Scorm from a crack in the rock and Laval decides to leave him a Chi "because in Chima, Chi is shared". A moment later the crack collapses. The protagonists and Crominus return to Chima where they are greeted as heroes. Crominus apologizes to Lagravis and confesses what he did to Lavertus. The Legend Beasts fly to Mount Cavora and release the Chi falls. In the scorpion cave Scorm is shocked by Laval's gesture. He then decides that the Chi is a curse and throws his orb into a ravine. The Chi falls into a cave with frozen warriors in it. The last frame shows an eye opening.

=== Season 3: Legend of the Fire Chi (2014) ===
No. overall	No. in season	Title	Directed by	Written by	Original air date	US viewers (millions)
27	1	"Fire Dreaming"	Peder Pedersen	John Derevlany	August 9, 2014	1.10
In a scene that reminds the first episode, Eris is flying peacefully when her wings catch fire. The scene turns out to be a dream of Eris herself, who wakes up and, still scared, flies to Laval and Cragger. However, the two are too busy telling their heroic feats and celebrating peace in Chima to listen to the eagle. At the bottom of the ravine seen in the previous episode, the Chi orb, wanting to be used, sends its energy to Sir Fangar, a saber-tooth tiger warrior who has been frozen for a thousand years. Shortly after, all the other Chi orbs of the Crawlers, which Scorm ordered to be thrown away, fall into the ravine. Freed from the ice, Sir Fangar uses the Chi to awaken the saber-tooth, mammoth and vulture tribes, his Ice Hunters. He declares to them that he wants to conquer Chima like he did a thousand years before. In Chima, Eris has a new dream in which she catches fire, this time while awake and in front of everyone. The other animals mock her but she can't help but feel worried. The Ice Hunters climb the ravine and discover that they can freeze everything in their path. With this power that "ices" even the enemies' shots, they easily defeat and freeze the Crawlers. When the Hunters discover that the cave has no exit, Sir Fangar leads them to the caves under Chima, where they create an ice bridge to climb up. At the Forever Rock, the 8 protagonists of the previous season make a bonfire and it is discovered that all the tribes have a different version of the Great Story, but no one can tell Eris what there was in Chima before that. In the final scene, Skinnet is wandering through the fangs when he sees snow coming out of the Gorge of Eternal Depth.: Note –As all season openings, this episode has no opening credits and the series logo and the episode title appear at the end of the opening scene. Also, the summary of the previous episodes is made by Laval and Cragger when they tell their adventures instead of Lagravis' voiceover at the beginning of the episode.
28	2	"Attack of the Ice Clan"	Peder Pedersen	John Derevlany	August 16, 2014	0.92
Eris has another dream where she is on fire and this time she also sees Mount Cavora burning. As soon as she wakes up she climbs onto the roof of the eagle library to check and from there she sees the ice that from the Outlands is approaching Chima. The Ice Hunters have in fact arrived and they invade the crocodile swamp first. The tribe is taken by surprise and only Cragger and Crooler escape, taking a frozen Crug with them. The two crocodiles arrive at the lion temple where they also find Eris, who came to voice her worries, and they confirm that Chima is under attack. At the crocodile swamp the Ice Hunters take possession of the tribe's Chi to awaken their companions who remained in the ice and Sir Fangar says he has plans for the frozen crocodiles. The tribes of Chima march together into the crocodile swamp where they clash with the Ice Hunters. Unfortunately, the ice makes the Chima animals and their vehicles slip, except for the wolves', and the only weapon that seems to work against these enemies is Rogon's rock catapult. The battle quickly turns for the worse and if that wasn't enough, during the fight Sir Fangar accidentally swallows a Chi, discovering how to power up. The tribes of Chima are forced to retreat, taking their frozen fallen with them and using a barrier created by their frozen shots to cover their escape.: Note –This is the first episode with the new theme song Day of Glory.
29	3	"The Call of Cavora"	Peder Pedersen	John Derevlany	August 23, 2014	1.08
The tribes of Chima ambush the Hunters by dropping rocks on them, as those were the only weapon that worked against them. The Hunters reveal that they have flying vehicles, which they use to force the Chima animals to flee again. Eris is forced to crash-land at the Crescent Hill, where she has another vision of a fiery temple and a phoenix. When Sir Fangar catches up to her and tries to freeze her, a mysterious fire barrier protects her, allowing her to escape. At the Eagle Library, Eris is told that the answers to her questions may be in the completely ridiculous section. Meanwhile, Laval and Cragger set a new trap for the Hunters, this time in the falling jungle. Eris tries to convince her friends that the answers to their problems are on Mount Cavora, as indicated by one of the completely ridiculous books, but the others prefer to continue with the trap. During the battle Eris is chased by two vultures and she decides to lure them to the Cavora Falls, causing them to freeze them. Eris proposes to Cragger and Laval to climb the frozen waterfalls and the two accept, since they have no other ideas on how to beat the Hunters. Once at the top the three enter the waterfall duct finding themselves in the Heart of Cavora: a room with 8 doors, one for each waterfall and tribe of Chima. The Legend Beasts come out of the doors, but they do not seem happy to see the heroes again and reveal that they can breathe fire. The flames do not burn them but lift them into the air and transport them to a new room that Eris recognizes as part of the phoenix temple. While from the outside Mount Cavora seems to be on fire Laval, Eris and Cragger are greeted by a red figure who says "we were expecting you".
30	4	"Trial by Fire"	Peder Pedersen	John Derevlany	August 30, 2014	1.20
Laval, Eris and Cragger are welcomed into the Phoenix Temple by their king Fluminox, who tells them the Story Before the Great Story: in ancient times the phoenixes were sent by the sun to take care of the ground born and they did so, teaching them everything they knew. A young saber-toothed tiger named Fangar, however, tried to use this knowledge to subjugate the tribes of Chima. For this reason, after giving refuge to the tiger tribe and to anyone they could, the 8 elder phoenixes decided to use the Fire Wings, ancient artifacts that contained the power of creation, to give life to the Great Illumination, a process that would purify Chima. Unfortunately the Hunters tried to fight the Great Illumination and for this the Gorge of Eternal Depth opened up under them and they were condemned to a dreamless sleep. It was the same power of the Great Illumination that gave the Hunters their powers and lifted Mount Cavora into the air. Fluminox gives Eris the Fire Chi, a new weapon against the Hunters' freeze, but when Cragger and Laval try to take it the phoenix says that they are not worthy as they are ground born. The tiger Tormak intercedes for them, convincing Fluminox to subject them to the Trial by Fire, as he had done. The first part of the Trial is a path through flames, but when they are almost at the end the two hear a child asking for help and they throw themselves into the fire to save him. The child reveals that he is Fluminox's son, Flinx, and that the real test was to see if they would help him. The second part of the Trial consists in crossing a river of lava guarded by the Legend Beasts. Laval and Cragger succeed and they and their tribes are declared worthy of the Fire Chi. Meanwhile, Lagravis is helping the beavers prepare for the Hunters' arrival. After an initial success, the tribe seems doomed, but Laval, Eris and Cragger arrive, they thaw the beavers and send the Hunters running with their new Fire Chi power.
31	5	"The Crescent"	Peder Pedersen	John Derevlany	September 6, 2014	1.09
Laval, Cragger, and Eris force the Hunters to retreat to their fortress. Realizing that the phoenixes returned, Sir Fangar organizes an attack on Crescent Hill aboard Speedorz, recollecting the fire barrier that protected Eris. Since Fluminox is reluctant to give Fire Chi to the other tribes of Chima, Eris and Tormak convince him to test them. The tribes' representatives then gather with their Speedorz at the Crescent, where Laval explains that the Trial of the phoenixes consists in defending the Hill from the Hunters' attack. Laval defeats Sir Fangar in a Speedorz duel, but the Hunters' armies force the heroes to retreat inside the Hill's fire barrier. There, they are joined by Skinnet who inadvertently releases his "battle stink". The heroes are forced to get out and they are about to be defeated by the Hunters when the phoenix temple rises from Mount Cavora, revealing itself to be a flying fortress, and it comes to their aid. The Hunters are forced to flee again and Fluminox reveals that the Crescent Hill is a phoenix outpost that from now on will be used to distribute the Fire Chi to the tribes of Chima, who passed the test since they did not abandon the Hill without even knowing what it was. Laval meets Li'ella, a lioness and Tormak's adopted daughter, and falls in love with her. All this time Lagravis, after his son told him that he has no sense of humor, has been trying to find something to make him laugh, with no success; but when Laval arrives at the end of the episode with an absurd tale of flying cities and beautiful lionesses, the laughter of the king of the lions can be heard all throughout Chima.
32	6	"Fired Up!"	Peder Pedersen	John Derevlany	September 13, 2014	1.21
The tribes of Chima have finally got enough Fire Chi to chase the Hunters to the Gorge of Eternal Depth, forcing them to jump. Sir Fangar had foreseen this however, and the Hunters had mixed ice and mud, creating a walkway of black ice invisible from above. From there, Sir Fangar sends Maula and her mammoths one way while he and a handful of warriors take an underground tunnel to the gorilla forest, where he heard that there is a lot of unused Chi. Meanwhile, at the fangs, the tribes of Chima are about to attack the hunters' fortress but they are stopped by the arrival of Li'ella and Fluminox. The phoenix king decided to entrust his son to Laval hoping that Flinx will finally be able to set his wings on fire like all the other phoenixes. Laval is not at all happy about having to babysit and therefore he decides to leave the phoenix child in the gorilla forest with G'loona. Once this is done, Laval and Eris return to the Hunters' fortress to participate in the attack but just then the mammoths appear behind the Chima animals, who find themselves surrounded. Sir Fangar arrives with his warriors in the gorilla forest and he recognizes Flinx as a phoenix child, since he doesn't freeze, the saber tooth decides to make a trophy out of him. However, thanks to G'loona's knowledge of the territory, she and Flinx force the Hunters to flee. At the fangs, the Chima animals are losing, but when Mungus, Maula's son, gets stuck, his brother Mottrot stops the battle and asks Laval to melt the ice that imprisons Mungus. Laval accepts in exchange for the mammoths' retreat. Before leaving, Maula reveals that Sir Fangar is at the gorilla forest. Laval and Eris rush there, arriving just in time to see the Hunters run away. Eris points out to her friend that he got very lucky and Laval decides not to lose sight of Flinx from that moment on.
33	7	"Cool and Collected"	Peder Pedersen	John Derevlany	September 20, 2014	1.19
Cragger secretly follows a group of hunters and discovers that they are using tunnels to travel, but in doing so he almost falls in the Gorge and only Plovar's intervention saves him. Meanwhile, Sir Fangar is obsessed with capturing Flinx and sends his Hunters to search for him throughout Chima while he observes everything from his mysterious "special room". However, the Hunters are unable to find the phoenix child, especially Vardy and his vultures, who lie in wait in the bear village, doing nothing. Flinx is at the Crescent, where Laval invites Li'ella on a tour of the lion temple. While Laval is distracted, Eris sees a mysterious animal, which she recognizes as a panther, when she chases it she has a new vision, which shows her a frozen Chima and a collapsing Mount Cavora. When Fluminox arrives, Eris asks him to explain but the phoenix king reveals that he didn't send her these visions and that he has no idea what a panther is. With that said, Fluminox reveals to Laval and Eris the existence of a network of underground tunnels that reach every corner of Chima and that the Hunters know this well. Since this puts all the tribes in danger, Fluminox assigns the eagle and the lion to escort the Legend Beasts to their respective tribes, that they can protect with their fire breath. The last stop is the crocodile swamp, where they are met by the Hunters who try to kidnap Flinx. In the confusion of the battle the Hunters retreat, convinced that they captured the phoenix child, but when they arrive at Sir Fangar's it is revealed that Mottrot, since he's never seen a phoenix, accidentally captured Plovar. It is also seen that Sir Fangar's special room is a trophy room where he keeps all the frozen animals on display. At the crocodile swamp Flinx is fine and he even almost managed to light his wings, but Cragger is depressed for the loss of his plover friend and vows to save him.
34	8	"The Snowball Effect"	Peder Pedersen	John Derevlany	September 27, 2014	1.17
Sir Fangar sees that Flinx is at the lion temple and orders his Hunters to get him more trophies while he takes care of the phoenix child. The saber-tooth also recognizes Li'ella, who he has been in love with ever since he burned her village. Vardy and his vultures take advantage of the Bear Legend Beast's sleep to freeze and kidnap his tribe, meanwhile Maula and her mammoths trap the Rhino Legend Beast, Rinona and the rhinos' Fire Chi in one of the tunnels and then attack the tribe. Only Rogon, Rukus and Runk are not frozen, since they already powered up with Fire Chi. While trying to fight, the three discover snowboarding and forget about the battle, choosing to play instead. Much to Maula's surprise, first Mungus and then the entire mammoth tribe decide to join the fun. Maula then accuses her sons of breaking her heart and convinces her tribe to resume the attack but the rhinos are saved by Rinona and their Legend Beast, who broke free, and they force the mammoths to flee. Eris continues to be tormented by the visions of the panther and of Chima freezing but Fluminox insists that he does not know what they mean and that since the phoenixes have nothing to do with it, these messages come from Chima itself. Meanwhile Laval takes Li'ella on a tour of the lion temple, but Flinx keeps on interrupting, much to the Laval's annoyance. At one point Li'ella sees the saber-tooth tribe approaching the temple and she and Laval go face them with the Lion Legend Beast. The attack is actually a diversion, in fact while the Legend Beast is away Sir Fangar and his warriors enter the throne room through a tunnel and freeze Lagravis. When they are about to leave the Hunters are stopped by Tormak, who holds them until Laval and the Lion Legend Beast return. After the saber-tooths escape, Li'ella explains that her father arrived through the tunnels, since he is the last of the tunnelcats, a group of warriors who fought in the underground of Chima. The lioness also reveals that that's where he found her before adopting her. Laval is informed that his father is missing, Sir Fangar took advantage of the confusion of the battle to take him to his trophy room.
35	9	"The King Thing"	Peder Pedersen	John Derevlany	October 4, 2014	1.16
Plovar frees himself and escape from the Hunters' fortress. Reunited with Cragger, the two go to the lion temple to inform Laval of the trophy room. The lion wants to attack immediately, but Longtooth reminds him that he is now the king of the lions and therefore he has duties towards all the tribes of Chima. Laval is then forced to take care of incredibly boring matters. Sir Fangar in the meantime decides not to wait for his fortress to arrive at the lion temple, fearing to lose the opportunity to capture Flinx, and so he orders an attack through the tunnels. Voom Voom and Vornon arrive at the temple with a message, but the two also carry freeze bombs that explode, imprisoning the Lion Legend Beast and beginning the attack. The lions are taken by surprise and things immediately go south, with Sir Fangar cornering Laval and Flinx. The tribe is saved by the flying phoenix temple that comes to their aid, forcing the Hunters to retreat. While Tormak closes all the caverns, Li'ella saves Laval and Flinx, but before escaping in a helicopter, Sir Fangar makes a last attempt to catch the phoenix child and the lioness. Laval clings to the two to hold them back, but Li'ella decides to sacrifice herself and forces Sir Fangar to drop Flinx by biting his arm. While the lions and Cragger celebrate the victory, the phoenix child and Laval can only watch as Li'ella disappears along with the Hunters' armies.
36	10	"A Very Slippery Slope"	Peder Pedersen	John Derevlany	October 11, 2014	1.32
Laval has a plan: the beavers built a fake bridge in the path of the Hunters' fortress, when it gets over, the fortress will fall into the canyon below. Before the collapse, Laval, Eris, Cragger, Tormak and Flinx will sneak in and save Sir Fangar's trophies while Worriz and Gorzan create a diversion. The plan seems to work but when they get to the trophy room they don't know how to get them out. Flinx, who in the meantime managed to set his wings on fire, starts to heat the room and thaws out Lagravis, the crocodile tribe, the bears and all the other prisoners. Unfortunately, the scorpions, spiders and bats also break free and attack the animals of Chima. Scorm also reveals that it was the Chi given to him by Laval that awakened the Hunters. Once again Flinx solves the situation by melting the ice on the floor, causing the Crawlers to fall. While Eris and Cragger lead the prisoners out, Laval and Tormak keep on searching for Li'ella, who was not among the trophies. When the entire mountain seems about to melt, the two realize they lost sight of Flinx. The phoenix child is still in the trophy room when Sir Fangar arrives, Flinx asks him about Li'ella but the saber tooth tells him that he sent her away to prepare for their wedding, since he intends to force her to marry him. Sir Fangar tries to capture Flinx but he can't get close because of the heat. Laval and Tormak arrive just in time to drag the phoenix child away before the fortress melts completely and collapses. Once outside Flinx reveals what Sir Fangar told him and Laval decides to stop the wedding at any cost.
37	11	"The Artifact"	Peder Pedersen	John Derevlany	October 18, 2014	1.26
After the destruction of the Hunters' fortress, the tribes scout Chima to find them and Li'ella, but to no avail. The Hunters took refuge underground where they are building a new fortress, but Sir Fangar is worried that the phoenixes will reunite the 8 Fire Wings and start a new Great Illumination to defeat them. At the phoenix temple, Fluminox tries to comfort Tormak by reminding him how he was by his side a thousand years ago. It is revealed that Fluminox was supposed to take part with the 8 elder phoenixes in the Great Illumination as the ninth phoenix, but he chose not to, and this is the reason why it was imperfect, creating Mount Cavora, the Chi and the power of the Hunters. Vardy meanwhile decided that Sir Fangar and Li'ella's wedding will take place on the top of spiral mountain. The preparations are inevitably seen by Razar, who informs the other tribes of Chima. While searching for Li'ella, Tormak meets Sir Fangar, who offers him a deal: he will give Li'ella back in exchange for the Artifact, the only map that marks the positions of the Fire Wing Harnesses. Tormak is tormented by doubt but he cannot bear to think he'll never see his daughter again and so he decides to steal the Artifact. However, just outside the territory of the phoenixes, the Artifact explodes and the flames burn Tormak's fur, revealing he is the panther of Eris' visions. Tormak also discovers that Sir Fangar had never really planned to give him back Li'ella and, tormented by the shame of his betrayal, he runs away, chased by the phoenix temple. Eris is now worried that the rest of her vision will also come true and that Chima is doomed to freeze.
38	12	"The Phoenix Has Landed"	Peder Pedersen	John Derevlany	October 25, 2014	0.92
Sir Fangar is about to marry Li'ella but the ceremony is interrupted when Laval and his friends attack, they successfully defeat the Hunters and free the lioness. Tormak, not knowing that his daughter is free, takes shelter among the carnivorous plants of the Outlands. At the phoenix temple, Flinx sees his father depressed by Tormak's betrayal and the loss of the Artifact. Fluminox is convinced that without the Fire Wings there is no hope for Chima. Flinx decides to face the Hunters alone and he chases them to the fangs. However, the Hunters lure him above the Gorge of Eternal Depth and once there the warmth of the phoenix child melts the ice that was blocking the Gorge causing him to fall. The Hunters then refreeze the Gorge trapping the child who, despite his fire, risks freezing. Fluminox senses his son's fear and flies to rescue him aboard the phoenix temple together with Laval, Cragger, Eris and Li'ella. As they arrive at the fangs they realize that melting all that ice could drown Flinx and so they decide to fly into the Gorge and land on the bottom. Having recovered Flinx they try to fly back up but the Hunters to throw enough ice and rocks at them to make the temple crash land at the bottom of the Gorge. It seems that there is no way out but from the darkness of the cave Shadowind, aka Lavertus, unexpectedly arrives with his Golden Chi.
39	13	"A Spark of Hope"	Peder Pedersen	John Derevlany	November 1, 2014	0.75
With the Phoenix Temple out of action, the Hunters use the advantage to freeze all of Chima. The Legend Beasts keep their tribes warm, but the rest of the land is covered in ice. Without a Legend Beast to protect them, the beavers are all frozen. In addition, the Crescent Hill is surrounded by a wall of ice to prevent the tribes to access to the Fire Chi. At the bottom of the Gorge of Eternal Depth, Lavertus recalls how he tried to recover the Chi thrown away by Scorm and ran into the Hunters. Thanks to his Golden Chi he avoided being frozen, but he was still trapped and could not warn the tribes of Chima. Lavertus suggests that the group create pillars to remove the ice and rocks above them in order to free the flying temple. While using the Golden Chi, the phoenixes show a great affinity with it and Fluminox helps Eris with her pillar, telling her that she has the soul of a phoenix. The group gets free but once outside they see that Chima is frozen and that the Hunters have a new ice fortress and they are marching towards the lion temple. Sir Fangar sees that the flying temple is back and orders his Hunters to speed up. Once they reach the top of Mount Cavora, Fluminox tells the group that their last hope are the Fire Wings, but without the Artifact that Tormak destroyed they cannot find the Harnesses. The phoenix king says that Chima is doomed and Li'ella despairs for her father but Laval, Eris, Cragger and Flinx remind them that there is always hope. Lavertus notices a great light coming from the Outlands. It is Tormak, the power of the Artifact is burning him and, in a phenomenon similar to the Chi enhancement, the panther projects a mysterious symbol.
40	14	"Wings of Fire"	Peder Pedersen	John Derevlany	November 22, 2014	1.59
Laval, Eris, Cragger, Li'ella and Lavertus go to the Outlands and discover that the light they saw comes from Tormak. The panther tells them that he can help them and projects the mysterious symbol again. Tormak explains that when the Artifact exploded he absorbed its essence and that the symbol is actually the map to the Fire Wing Harnesses. The first stop is Eagle Spire, where Eris overcomes the phoenixes' defense system and she obtains the first of the Fire Wings. The eagle explains to the others that to find the Harnesses they need to think like a phoenix and "be willing to lose everything to gain everything". The group decides to split up to find the other Fire Wings more quickly: Li'ella goes with Tormak, Eris with Cragger and Laval with Lavertus. As they are about to leave they hear Lagravis' emergency roar: the Hunters are attacking the lion temple. Laval wants to help his father but Lavertus convinces him to continue his mission and let him go help his brother instead. The tribes of Chima, except the ever sleeping bears, come to the aid of the lions and even the flying phoenix temple joins the battle bringing the tiger tribe. Seeing that they are losing, Sir Fangar sends Vardy and his vultures to free the fourth tribe of Hunters. On Spiral Mountain, Cragger realizes that, although the phoenixes call themselves the guardians of Chima, he, Eris and Laval are much more so, and thus obtains his Fire Wings. At the canyon, Laval clashes with Mungus and Mottrot and, having also understood Eris's words, he throws himself into the canyon, managing to grab his Fire Wing Harness while falling. Before he crashes, he is saved by Cragger aboard a new crocodile helicopter. In the cave where the Hunters were frozen, the vultures awaken the ice bears, a tribe of uncontrollably violent warriors. The instant the ice bears are freed, the bears of Chima dream of their awakening and wake up themselves.: Note –In this episode the initial summary is done by Fluminox's voiceover instead of Lagravis'.
41	15	"The Heart of Cavora"	Peder Pedersen	John Derevlany	November 22, 2014	1.59
The Ice Bears arrive in Chima to help their allies, proving to be formidable warriors. Their intervention allows the Ice Hunters to seize all the Chi and use it to create a mountain of ice to reach Mount Cavora. The ice blinds the pilots of the phoenix temple, resulting in its crashing against the mountain. Laval and Cragger collected 7 Harnesses and split from Tormak and Li'ella to meet Eris at the Forever Rock. On their way they are amazed to meet the bear tribe, incredibly awake and angry, heading off to fight the Ice Bears. At the Forever Rock Eris has a vision of Fluminox who tells her that they haven't found the last Fire Wing Harness because they haven't searched forever. The eagle realizes that the last Harness is inside the Forever Rock itself and she recovers it. Eris explains to Laval and Cragger that her vision also told her that they need their friends from the 8 tribes of Chima to start the Great Illumination so she calls them all together. Laval, Eris and Cragger convince their friends that to save Chima they must fly with the Fire Wings at full speed into the Heart of Cavora, but as they approach the mountain, they are faced with an army of vultures. Meanwhile, the ice mountain reached Mount Cavora and the Hunters invaded the home of the phoenixes. Sir Fangar finds Fluminox and Flinx in the room above the Heart of Cavora and accuses the phoenix king of betraying his tribe by ruining the first Great Illumination. Fluminox then confesses to his son that the reason why he gave up being the ninth phoenix was precisely so as not to have to abandon Flinx himself, since he was just born at the time. Outside the flying mountain, the 8 heroes of Chima are unable to advance but get rescued by Tormak and Li'ella, who found and repaired the phoenix temple. The 8 are then free to fly into the Heart of Cavora. Inside, Flinx sees the light of the Fire Wings and throws himself in before Sir Fangar can stop him, thus becoming the ninth phoenix. The Great Illumination can finally happen: Chima is thawed, the Hunters are healed from both the ice and their evil, and so is Crooler, Tormak becomes a tiger once again and even Skinnet's stinks become fragrant. The 8 heroes of Chima wake up in the Heart of Cavora and see that the phoenix temple is gone and that the tribe of the children of the sun, having turned Chima into a paradise and therefore completed their task, are returning to their parent. The protagonists can happily watch their home, finally peaceful and balanced. The last frame shows that Chima and the Outlands are a giant flying mountain themselves, floating above the vast Wyldness.: Note –In this episode the summary of the previous episodes is done by Eris' voicevoer instead of Lagravis'. Also, instead of the theme song, a sequence of images is shown accompanied by one of the typical background music of the series.

== Mini movies ==
A series of mini-movies of extra adventures in the land of Chima were uploaded on the Lego website and YouTube channel. A selection of them appeared on special Season 1 Part 1 DVD releases.

== Background and production ==
=== Development ===
Legends of Chima was produced by M2Film, an animation studio in Denmark. The supervising producer was Ole Holm Christensen. Each episode is 22 minutes. The production involved a team of 300 that were based in various locations including Denmark, Paris, Barcelona, Amsterdam, Vancouver, Los Angeles, Mumbai, and Bangkok. Christensen commented, "Our designers, art directors, animators, everyone couldn't wait to sink their teeth into the project. Our art team, which is spread out all over the world, created lots of concept art for the series. The goal was to create something special that, at least in our view, was unique and hadn't been seen before on television." The artists took their inspiration from a wide variety of sources, including "many different elements of pop culture". The demands of the animation required a Maya-based CG pipeline and heavy render farms, with each episode taking about 12 weeks to produce. The Chima characters were animated to resemble the shiny plastic surfaces of Lego minifigures, rather than recreating animal fur.

In 2021, the co-creator of Lego Ninjago Tommy Andreasen revealed unseen concept art for Legends of Chima on Twitter. Andreasen explained, "This is a concept film that was made to explain Legends of Chima's ending internally. The search for the Fire Wings was intended to be a 6-episode arc which would also have introduced Florax, Flinx's mother, chief botanist of Chima, but plans were revised."

=== Writing ===
The storyline was written by Los Angeles-based writer John Derevlany. He commented, "Usually things get dramatically scaled back for production reasons. In the case of Legends of Chima, everything got even more epic. I think the show is quite special because it tells simple children's stories set against incredible action scenes and a very deep, immersive mythology."

=== Cast ===
- David Attar - Cragger, Lennox, Rogon, Ripnik, Reegull, Stealthor, Sparracon, Scrug
- Bethany Brown - Eris, Crooler, Wonald
- Matt Cronander - Wilhurt, Ewar, Elon
- Bill Courage - Crominus, Lagravis, Longtooth, Lavertus, Mottrot, Sparracon, Sparratus
- Chris Durchand - Dom De La Woosh
- Jesse Inocalla - Plovar, Grumlo, Runk, Scorm
- Meghan Kinsley - Crunket, G'Loona, Windra
- John Nelson - Wakz, Crug, Balkar, Rukus
- Michael Patric - Gorzan, Eglor, Brezar
- Scott Shantz - Laval, Worriz, Skinnet, Furtivo, Razcal, Scolder, Scutter, Vardy, Firox
- Jeff Evans Todd - Razar, Bladvic, Crawley, Winzar, Leonidas, Equila, Ewald, Sparratus, Scolder, Frax, Lundor, Voom Voom, Strainor
- Adam White - Foltrax
- Dave Pettitt - Tormak
- Cassandra Ford - Spinlyn, Maula
- Racquel Belmonte - Rinona, Li'Ella
- Christopher Molineux - Sir Fangar, Vornon
- Sean Shaffer - Fluminox
- Paula Hoffman - Flinx

=== Crew ===
- Doug Parker - Voice Director

== Reception ==
=== Critical reception ===
On 9 July 2013, Brian Lowry for Variety commented that Legends of Chima is, "an elaborate hodge-podge culled from a half-dozen familiar properties — including the Force-like powers Laval's dad possesses and the hovering vehicles upon which characters zoom around — and appears to exist for no other reason than to sell brightly hued little action figures." Emily Ashby for Common Sense Media gave the series a four out of five-star rating and commented, "Legends of Chima is a thoughtful, beautifully designed animated series that exceeds expectations for a story designed to sell accompanying toys. From the characters' complicated relationships to the mysticism behind the evolution of the talking animal species, this is far more than a one-dimensional tale meant to merely fill kids' time. Instead, it explores friendship, trust, loyalty, and honesty against a backdrop of conflict that's mild enough to appeal to grade schoolers (and their parents)."

=== Ratings ===
The series premiere was watched by 1.5 million viewers, making it the 10th highest-rated show overall on cable that night.

=== Awards ===
Award	Category	Nominee	Result
Banff Rockie Award	Best Branded Entertainment	M2Film; Lego	Won
Banff Rockie Award	Breakthrough Entertainment Award of Excellence in Kids Animation	M2Film; Lego	Won
Gold Camera	Entertainment - Children's	Tommy Andreasen; John Derevlany; Erik Legernes; Phil McCormick; M2Film; Lego	Won

== Soundtrack ==
The music for Legends of Chima was written by Danish composer Anthony Lledo who had worked together with Peder Pedersen on the director's Indiana Jones and Star WarWars-themedgo shorts. The music was awarded the 2013 Cue Award for Best Television Score and has been released on two soundtrack albums by MovieScore Media.

Legends of Chima (Released 2013)

No.	Title	Length
1.	"Laval the Lion"	3:17
2.	"Chi"	2:40
3.	"Playful Tribes"	2:36
4.	"The Croc Swamp"	3:04
5.	"Cragger"	2:37
6.	"Speedor Races"	2:10
7.	"When We Were Kids"	2:12
8.	"Rhinos"	1:51
9.	"The Warrior Within"	2:26
10.	"Forever Rock"	2:14
11.	"Drums Of Chima"	1:30
12.	"The Big Battle"	2:20
13.	"The Great Story"	2:53
Total length:		31:50

Legends of Chima Vol. 2 (Released 2015)

No.	Title	Length
1.	"Return of the Heroes"	3:32
2.	"Into the Outlands"	3:16
3.	"The Dark Tribes"	4:19
4.	"Ancient Hunters"	3:02
5.	"The Phoenix"	3:27
6.	"Hills of Chima"	2:50
7.	"Lavertus"	3:28
8.	"Frozen Land"	2:21
9.	"The Tale of Tormak"	3:30
10.	"Victory"	2:13
Total length:		31:00

== Legacy ==
In 2015, it's revealed in the season finale of Ninjago season 5, "Curseworld Part II", that Chima is one of the 16 realms that runs parallel to Ninjago. It featured an altered scene from episode 15 of Chima. In Ninjago: Dragons Rising, after all 16 realms merged with Ninjago, it was revealed that Chima is in fact part of a larger realm called the Wyldness. It's speculated that the villain Lord Ras is from Chima.

In Nexo Knights in 2016, two scenes show Chima and Eris in cameos.

== See also ==
- Ninjago
- Nexo Knights

== Bibliography ==
- Eris to the Rescue. Authored by Marilyn Easton. Published by Turtleback Books, 2013. ISBN 0-60632-398-8
- LEGO (R) Legends of Chima Brickmaster the Quest for CHI. Published by Dorling Kindersley, 2013. ISBN 1-40932-606-3
- Lego Legends of Chima: Tribes of Chima. Authored by Ruth Amos. Published by Dorling Kindersley, 2013. ISBN 1-46540-863-0
- Lego Legends of Chima: The Race for Chi. Authored by Ruth Amos. Published by Dorling Kindersley, 2013. ISBN 1-46540-865-7
- LEGO Legends of Chima Official Annual 2014. Published by Penguin Books Ltd., 2013. ISBN 0-72327-583-1
- LEGO (R) Legends of Chima Ultimate Sticker Collection. Published by Dorling Kindersley, 2013. ISBN 1-40933-086-9
- LEGO Legends of Chima: Wolves and Crocodiles Activity Book with Minifigure. Published by Penguin Random House Children's UK, 2013. ISBN 0-72327-561-0
- Gorillas Gone Bananas. Authored by Greg Farshtey. Published by Scholastic Inc., 2013. ISBN 0-54551-752-4
- Lego(r) Legends of Chima: Attack of the Crocodiles (Chapter Book #1). Authored by Greg Farshtey. Published by Scholastic Inc., 2013. ISBN 0-54551-649-8
- Lego Legends of Chima: Beware of the Wolves (Chapter Book #2). Authored by Greg Farshtey. Published by Scholastic Inc., 2013. ISBN 0-54551-650-1
- Lego Legends of Chima: Danger in the Outlands (Chapter Book #5). Authored by Greg Farshtey. Published by Scholastic Inc., 2014. ISBN 0-54562-788-5
- LEGO (R) Legends of Chima Character Encyclopedia. Published by Dorling Kindersley, 2014. ISBN 1-40935-054-1
- How to Draw Heroes and Villains. Authored by Ron Zalme. Published by Scholastic Inc., 2014. ISBN 0-54564-992-7
- Lego: Legends of Chima Official Guide with Figurine. Authored by Tracey West. Published by Scholastic Inc., 2014. ISBN 0-54553-754-1
- Lego Legends of Chima: Heroes' Quest. Authored by Heather Seabrook. Published by Dorling Kindersley, 2014. ISBN 1-46541-982-9
- LEGO (R) Legends of Chima Ultimate Factivity Collection. Published by Dorling Kindersley, 2014. ISBN 1-40935-258-7
- Lego Legends of Chima: Ravens and Gorillas (Activity Book #3). Published by Scholastic Inc., 2014. ISBN 0-54564-527-1
- Lego Legends of Chima: Character Encyclopedia. Authored by Beth Landis Hester and Heather Seabrook. Published by Dorling Kindersley, 2014. ISBN 1-46541-666-8
- Lego Legends of Chima: Character Encyclopedia (Library Edition). Authored by Beth Landis Hester. Published by Dorling Kindersley, 2014. ISBN 1-46542-291-9
- Lego Legends of Chima: Power Up!. Authored by Julia March. Published by Dorling Kindersley, 2015. ISBN 1-46542-950-6
