= Legends of Chima (soundtrack) =

Soundtrack album by Anthony Lledo
- Released: December 3, 2013
- Genre: Soundtrack
- Length: 31:50
- Label: MovieScore Media
- Producer: Anthony Lledo

Anthony Lledo chronology
Frostbite (2006)	Legends of Chima (2013)	Legends of Chima Vol. 2 (2015)

Legends of Chima is the first soundtrack for the animated fantasy TV series of the same name. The orchestral score was composed by Anthony Lledo and released in 2013 on MovieScore Media.

== Track listing ==
Music composed by Anthony Lledo.

No.	Title	Length
1.	"Laval the Lion"	3:17
2.	"Chi"	2:40
3.	"Playful Tribes"	2:36
4.	"The Croc Swamp"	3:04
5.	"Cragger"	2:37
6.	"Speedor Races"	2:10
7.	"When We Were Kids"	2:12
8.	"Rhinos"	1:51
9.	"The Warrior Within"	2:26
10.	"Forever Rock"	2:14
11.	"Drums of Chima"	1:30
12.	"The Big Battle"	2:20
13.	"The Great Story"	2:53

== Credits ==
- Anthony Lledo - Composer, Orchestration, Score Producer, Album Producer
- Oleg Kondratenko - Conductor
- Orchestra - F.A.M.E.'s Macedonian Radio Symphonic Orchestra
- Sara Andon - Flute
- Ted Sugata - Oboe & Cor Anglais
- Amanda Walker - Clarinet & Bass Clarinet
- Elliot Lledo Bager - Clarinet
- Giorgi Hristovski - Sound engineer
- Boban Apostolov - Pro Tools engineer
- Riste Trajkovski - Stage Manager
- John Rodd - Album Mastering
- Laurent Koppitz - Orchestra Contractor
- Mikael Carlsson - Album Producer

== Reception ==
The music for Legends of Chima has received widely critical acclaim and was named one of the best scores for television in 2013 by several reviewers. It was awarded the 2013 Cue Award for Best Score for Television by Tracksounds.com.
