= Frostbite (disambiguation) =

Frostbite is a medical condition involving damage to skin and tissues due to extreme cold. The term may also refer to:

== Fictional characters ==
- Frostbite (comics):

- Frostbite (G.I. Joe), a character that has appeared in a number of G.I. Joe comics

- Frostbite, a Marvel Comics character who was a member of the team in X-Men 2099

- Frostbite, a character that appeared in DC Comics' Young Heroes in Love
- Frostbite, a fused mash-up version of the characters Nitara and Sub-Zero in Mortal Kombat 1

== Films ==
- Frostbite (2005 film), an American direct-to-video film
- Frostbite (2006 film), a Swedish horror film, originally entitled Frostbiten
  - Frostbite (soundtrack), the soundtrack to the film by Anthony Lledo

== Games ==
- Frostbite (game engine), a game engine developed by EA DICE
- Frostbite (video game), a 1983 game for the Atari 2600

== Literature ==
- Frostbite (Mead novel), a vampire novel written by Richelle Mead
- Frostbite (Wellington novel), a werewolf horror novel by David Wellington

== Music ==
- Frostbite (album), an album by Albert Collins
- Frostbite, a musical project by Einar Örn Benediktsson of the Sugarcubes and Hilmar Örn Hilmarsson a.k.a. HÖH
- "Frostbite", a song by Erra from Augment
- "Frostbite", a song by Michael Learns to Rock from Take Me to Your Heart
- "Frostibe", a song by Parkway Drive from Horizons

== See also ==
- Freezer burn, the spoilage of food due to frost
