= Men in Black II (soundtrack) =

Men in Black II (Music from the Motion Picture)

Soundtrack album by Danny Elfman and various artists
- Released: June 25, 2002
- Recorded: 2002
- Studios: Newman Scoring Stage, 20th Century Fox, Los Angeles
- Length: 53:19
- Labels: Overbrook; Columbia

Danny Elfman chronology
Spider-Man (2002)	Men in Black II (Music from the Motion Picture) (2002)	Red Dragon (2002)

Singles from Men in Black II (Music from the Motion Picture)
- 1. "Black Suits Comin' (Nod Ya Head)" Released: May 13, 2002

Men in Black II (Music from the Motion Picture) is the soundtrack to the 2002 film Men in Black II directed by Barry Sonnenfeld; a sequel to Men in Black (1997) and the second instalment in the eponymous film trilogy starring Will Smith and Tommy Lee Jones, reprising their roles from the predecessor. The soundtrack released through Overbrook Entertainment and Columbia Records on June 25, 2002 and featured original score composed by Danny Elfman and three songs—"Black Suits Comin' (Nod Ya Head)" by Will Smith and Trā-Knox, "Who Let the Dogs Out" by Baha Men and "I Will Survive" by Tim Blaney—the former of which was released as a single on May 13, 2002.

== Critical reception ==
Christian Clemmensen of Filmtracks.com wrote "Elfman fans and everyone else in the known universe have heard this score once before, making it an unnecessary addition to any collection." Thomas Glorieux of Maintitles wrote "Men in Black 2 is saved from the same mistakes due to the diversity and better cohesion in tracks. Yet as a listening experience it could have been better if the best moments of the first returned to replace the worst moments of the second." James Southall of Movie Wave wrote "there aren't those standout moments, but the album plays consistently well from start to finish." Heather Phares of AllMusic wrote "Much like his score for the first film, Danny Elfman's score for Men in Black II mixes the composer's innately twisted melodies and arrangements with allusions to classic spy themes and urban music (as a nod to the film's star, Will Smith). This time around, Elfman's compositions aren't quite as outlandish, serving more as a backdrop to the film's action than a musical commentary on it."

== Track listing ==
All tracks are written and produced by Danny Elfman, except where noted.

No.	Title	Writer(s)	Producer(s)	Length
1.	"Worms Lounge 1 (Worms in Black)"			5:20
2.	"Logo"			0:22
3.	"Titles"			5:01
4.	"Big Jeff"			2:25
5.	"Headquarters"			1:52
6.	"Chop-Chop"			2:00
7.	"Heart Thump"			1:51
8.	"Customs"			0:51
9.	"Hunting For K"			1:41
10.	"J Nabbed / K's Back"			2:20
11.	"The Real Story"			1:41
12.	"Sleuthing"			2:21
13.	"The Defense Begins"			2:47
14.	"The Chase"			3:22
15.	"The Light"			5:44
16.	"The Finale"			0:18
17.	"Worm Lounge 2"			3:09
18.	"Titles Revisited"			2:57
19.	"I Will Survive" (performed by Tim Blaney as "Frank the Pug")	Dino Fekaris; Frederick J. Perren	Oji	3:03
20.	"Black Suits Comin' (Nod Ya Head)" (performed by Will Smith introducing Trā-Knox)	Will Smith; Mark Sparks; Ron Feemster; Lennie Bennett; Lance Bennett; LeMar Bennett	Mark Sparks; Rob Chiarelli; Will Smith; Ron Feemster (add.)	4:20
Total length:				53:19

== Personnel ==
Credits adapted from liner notes.

Tracks 1-18

- Pete Anthony – conductor
- Steve Bartek – supervising orchestrator, orchestrations
- Edgardo Simone – orchestrations
- David Slonaker – orchestrations
- Bruce Fowler – orchestrations
- Marc Mann – additional orchestrations, MIDI supervision, choral conducting
- Dennis Sands – score engineering and mixing
- John Rodd – recordist
- Greg Dennen – additional recording
- Adam Michalak – additional recording
- Bill Abbott – music editor, digital editing
- Denise Okimoto – assistant music editor
- Noah Snyder – tech support
- Julian Bratolyubov – music preparation
- Ron Vermillion – additional music preparations
- The Music Team – orchestra contractor
- Debbi Datz-Pyle – orchestra contractor
- Bill Talbott – technical engineer
- Tom Steel – scoring stage crew
- Damon Tedesco – scoring stage crew

"I Will Survive"

- Oji Pierce – mixing, keyboards
- J.J. Farriss – string arrangements, additional programming
- Louis Taylor – saxophone
- Robert Palmer – guitar
- Leslie King – bass guitar

"Black Suits Comin' (Nod Ya Head)"

- Rob Chiarelli – engineer, mixing, bass guitar
- Chandler Bridges – engineer, Pro Tools engineer
- Brian Golder – Pro Tools engineer
- Alan Sides – strings engineer
- Will Smith – mixing
- David Campbell – string arrangements
- Jerry Hey – horn arrangements
- Trā-Knox – backing vocals
- Li'l John Roberts – drums
- Tim Pierce – guitar
- Chuckii Booker – Clavinet
- Adam "DJ AM" Goldstein – scratches
- Ron Feemster – keyboards

== Charts ==
Chart performance for Men in Black II (Music from the Motion Picture)
Chart (2012)	Peak position
Austrian Albums (Ö3 Austria)	34
UK Soundtrack Albums (OCC)	45
US Top Soundtracks (Billboard)	16
