= Let the Right One In (soundtrack) =

Let the Right One In (Original Motion Picture Soundtrack)

Film score by Johan Söderqvist
- Released: 11 November 2008
- Length: 46:52
- Label: MovieScore Media

Johan Söderqvist chronology
Things We Lost in the Fire (2007)	Let the Right One In (2008)	Love and Rage (2009)

Let the Right One In (Original Motion Picture Soundtrack) is the score album to the 2008 Swedish romantic horror film of the same name directed by Tomas Alfredson. The film's musical score is composed by Johan Söderqvist and performed by the Slovak National Symphony Orchestra. The soundtrack was released through MovieScore Media on 11 November 2008.

== Development ==
Swedish composer Johan Söderqvist wrote the score. Alfredson instructed him to write something that sounded hopeful and romantic, in contrast to the events that take place in the film. Söderqvist has described the outcome as consisting of both darkness and light, and emphasised melody and harmony as the most important qualities of the music. The Slovak National Symphony Orchestra performed the score; two years earlier they had performed the score for the first Swedish vampire movie, Frostbiten. On 11 November 2008, MovieScore Media released the film soundtrack in a limited edition of 500 copies. It contains 21 of Söderqvist's original scores from the film. A vinyl edition of the album was published through Death Waltz Recording Company in 2012 and another issue was presented by Svart Records and published on 1 September 2022.

== Reception ==
Joep de Bruijn of Maintitles, in a five-star review, called it as "a brilliant combination of pathos and horror". James Southall of Movie Wave wrote "Let the Right One In is high quality indeed, a highly-recommended release, particularly if you're looking to find some great film music from off the beaten track". Critic based at Movie Music UK called it as "one of the best horror film scores of 2008" and summarized "Söderqvist's lovely main themes are worth the price of the purchase alone, and hopefully will lead to a wider international exposure for this talented Swede."

A review from Into Film summarised "The music by Johan Söderqvist is so well suited to really bring out the mystery behind the story, every single moment of music has its chilling effect on the audience." Michael Gingold of Fangoria wrote "Johan Soderqvist's perfectly pitched score, establish a captivating mood." Justin Lowe of The Hollywood Reporter wrote that the film's music along with the other technical contributions "evocatively reinforce the film's haunted naturalism". Alissa Simon of Variety described it as "a clever soundtrack to convey the horror without music, flashy editing or special effects."

The album was placed fourth on Ain't It Cool News' Top 10 Best Scores Of 2008 List, being described as "scrupulously weaving together strains of bone-chillingly cold horror with the encompassing warmth of newly acquired love". Daniel Schweiger of If magazine described the score as "the most beautifully emotional score yet to grace the undead. It's a feeling of tender melancholy that delivers its scares in a subtle, chamber orchestra way".

== Track listing ==
Let the Right One In track listing
No.	Title	Length
1.	"The Arrival"	2:46
2.	"Eli and Oscar"	3:12
3.	"Eli's Theme"	2:41
4.	"The Slaughter"	2:49
5.	"Oscar in Love"	2:11
6.	"Hiding the Body"	1:34
7.	"After the Fight"	1:06
8.	"Oscar Strikes Back"	1:38
9.	"Virginia Wakes Up"	1:10
10.	"The Father"	1:48
11.	"Spotting a Victim"	1:13
12.	"Giving Up"	2:21
13.	"Death of Håkan"	2:18
14.	"Virginia Is Bitten"	2:32
15.	"Then We Are Together"	2:42
16.	"Virginia in Flames"	2:15
17.	"Eli Bleeds"	1:45
18.	"Related by Blood"	1:34
19.	"Lacke Dies"	1:47
20.	"Going Home"	1:41
21.	"Let the Right One In"	5:49
Total length:		46:52

== Credits ==
Credits adapted from liner notes.

- Acoustic guitar – Mats Bergström
- Baryton guitar – Uno Helmersson
- Composer, producer, piano, waterphone, hurdy gurdy – Johan Söderqvist
- Conductor, orchestrator – Hans Ek
- Contractor – Paul Talkington
- Electric guitar – Matias Torell
- Engineer – Martin Roller
- Executive producer – Mikael Carlsson
- Mastering – Fredrik Appelqvist
- Mixing – Jan Ugand, Per Sundström
- Orchestra – Slovak National Symphony Orchestra
- Orchestra leader – Viktor Simcisko
- Percussion – Erik Nilsson
- Recording – Peter Fuchs
