= The Purity of Vengeance (soundtrack) =

The Purity of Vengeance (Journal 64)

Soundtrack album by Mikkel Maltha & Anthony Lledo
- Released: October 19, 2018
- Studio: Teldex Studio Berlin
- Genre: Soundtrack
- Length: 50:26
- Label: MovieScore Media

The Purity of Vengeance (Journal 64) is the soundtrack to the 2018 Christoffer Boe film of the same name. The score was composed by Mikkel Maltha & Anthony Lledo and released in 2018 on MovieScore Media. The score was nominated for a Danish Film Academy Award.

== Track listing ==
Music composed by Mikkel Maltha & Anthony Lledo.

No.	Title	Length
1.	"Dragør 1961"	1:31
2.	"Tick Tock"	2:07
3.	"Red Room"	1:54
4.	"The Hole"	0:57
5.	"Five Years Carl!"	1:37
6.	"Danevang"	3:06
7.	"Carl Steals the Case"	1:42
8.	"Lament"	1:48
9.	"Rita"	1:56
10.	"The Key"	0:47
11.	"Autopsy"	1:50
12.	"Ping Ping"	1:54
13.	"Sprogø"	3:17
14.	"Escape"	1:16
15.	"Anger"	0:55
16.	"Nour"	3:32
17.	"Molotov"	2:26
18.	"Red Rose"	1:18
19.	"Sterilization"	2:01
20.	"Taxi"	0:53
21.	"Where Is Nour?"	2:14
22.	"The Ferry"	2:58
23.	"Cold Winter Theory"	3:25
24.	"In the News"	1:47
25.	"Come Back"	3:51

== Credits ==
- Anthony Lledo - Composer
- Mikkel Maltha - Composer
- Joris Bartsch Buhle - Conductor
- Orchestra - Berlin Session Strings
- Studio - Teldex Studio Berlin
- Peter Due - Orchestration
- Anthony Lledo - Orchestration
- Tobias Lehmann - Recording Producer
- Cornelius Dürst - Recording engineer
- John Rodd - Album Mastering
- Mikael Carlsson - Album Producer
