= The Bourne Identity (soundtrack) =

The Bourne Identity (Original Motion Picture Soundtrack)

Film score by John Powell
- Released: June 11, 2002
- Recorded: 2001–2002
- Studios: Newman Scoring Stage, 20th Century Fox Studios, Los Angeles; Paramount Scoring Stage, Paramount Pictures Studios, Hollywood, California; Signet Sound Studios, Los Angeles
- Genre: Film score
- Length: 53:09
- Label: Varèse Sarabande
- Producer: John Powell

John Powell chronology
| I Am Sam (2002) | The Bourne Identity (2002) | The Adventures of Pluto Nash (2002) |

The Bourne Identity (Original Motion Picture Soundtrack) is the film score composed by John Powell for the 2002 film The Bourne Identity, directed by Doug Liman, based on Robert Ludlum's 1980 novel of the same name; it is the first instalment in the Bourne franchise, and the film stars Matt Damon as the titular protagonist Jason Bourne. The score album was released by Varèse Sarabande on June 11, 2002.

== Background ==
Originally, Carter Burwell was hired to compose the score for The Bourne Identity. He wrote and recorded a traditional orchestral score; however, although Liman liked it, it was rejected as the score did not push the tone of the film the way Liman had envisioned, since he wanted to make an "anti-Bond film". As the film underwent extensive reshoots which delayed the post-production, Burwell opted out, citing his commitments to other films.

Liman then heard a demo piece of a musical cue, written by John Powell, and liking it, he contacted the executives of Media Ventures regarding his involvement through a meeting with the director. Powell then wrote a few demos for Liman, which the latter liked, and was ultimately brought on to the project. The film is Powel's first collaboration with Liman. He originally envisioned a score based on percussion, guitars, electronics and synthesizers; however, at the last minute, he and Liman decided to use an orchestra instead.

As much of the music budget had been spent on recording Burwell's rejected score, the team could not afford a large orchestra, so hired only the string section. Since Powell wanted a smaller orchestra, instead of the usual grand orchestral compositions for mainstream Hollywood films they used the strings as an overdub, providing a cinematic quality and a "real propulsive mechanism".

== Track listing ==
| No. | Title | Length |
|---|---|---|
| 1. | "Main Titles" | 4:17 |
| 2. | "Bourne Gets Well" | 1:20 |
| 3. | "Treadstone Assassins" | 2:09 |
| 4. | "At the Bank" | 4:07 |
| 5. | "Bourne on Land" | 1:42 |
| 6. | "Escape from Embassy" | 3:12 |
| 7. | "The Drive to Paris" | 0:12 |
| 8. | "The Apartment" | 3:25 |
| 9. | "At the Hairdressers" | 1:29 |
| 10. | "Hotel Regina" | 2:11 |
| 11. | "The Investigation" | 1:34 |
| 12. | "Taxi Ride" | 3:43 |
| 13. | "At the Farmhouse" | 2:54 |
| 14. | "Jason Phones It In" | 3:04 |
| 15. | "On Bridge Number 9" | 3:41 |
| 16. | "Jason's Theme" | 2:20 |
| 17. | "Mood Build" | 3:34 |
| 18. | "The Bourne Identity" | 6:00 |
| 19. | "Drum and Bass Remix" | 2:15 |
| Total length: | | 53:09 |

== Reception ==
Christian Clemmensen of Filmtracks disparaged the music, saying "the harsh electronic and string rhythms are the key selling point for the score to The Bourne Identity, and the main chopping, descending chase motif is all that most listeners will ever remember from the work [...] Looped rhythms, keyboarded effects, and creative manipulation techniques can be very tastefully applied to spy thrillers, but as [it] progresses, Powell's composition becomes more metallically distorted and obnoxious in tone. Late cues feature passages that sound as though he's recorded the banging of metal garbage cans and the scraping of metal rulers on a blackboard and integrated them as rhythmic highlights in his music. While this may be interesting at the very least for the first half hour of the score on album, it becomes increasingly intolerable as the presentation continues." Andrew Grenade of Soundtrack.Net wrote "There are many good ideas but there is little development beyond repetition until your ears bleed."

However, Kirk Honeycutt of The Hollywood Reporter wrote "John Powell’s pulsating score all eases us comfortably into that shadowy movie world of assassins and spies." Ed Gonzalez of Slant Magazine described it a "techno-symphonic score". Todd McCarthy of Variety wrote "Techno-slanted score by John Powell is tremendously propulsive". John Hazelton of Screen International wrote "Composer John Powell contributes greatly to the edgy feel with a music score that stays out of the way of the dramatic moments but pumps up the action with techno-flavoured rock." Ranking the soundtrack moments from the first three films, Sean Wilson of Den of Geek listed Powell's themes—"Treadstone Assassins", "Bourne on Land", "Escape from Embassy" and "The Apartment"—complimenting his dramatic and propulsive ability.

== Tumescent edition ==
The Bourne Identity: Tumescent Edition is the soundtrack that accompanied 31 tracks including alternates and unused cues. It was released by Varèse Sarabande on May 20, 2022, to coincide the 20th anniversary of the first film.

Track listing
| No. | Title | Length |
|---|---|---|
| 1. | "The Bourne Identity Main Titles" | 4:23 |
| 2. | "The Bourne Identity Original Opening" | 4:25 |
| 3. | "Bourne at Sea" | 1:25 |
| 4. | "Bourne on Land" | 1:45 |
| 5. | "Bourne on Land" (With Bassoon) | 1:41 |
| 6. | "Bourne on Land" (Alternate Version) | 1:55 |
| 7. | "Cafeteria" | 1:21 |
| 8. | "At the Bank" | 4:10 |
| 9. | "Escape from Embassy / Parking Garage" | 5:09 |
| 10. | "Activation" | 2:16 |
| 11. | "Marie on Monitor" | 2:01 |
| 12. | "Marie Drives / Bourne Sleeps" | 2:14 |
| 13. | "Marie Drives / Bourne Sleeps" (Alternate Version) | 2:01 |
| 14. | "JMK Is Dead" | 1:48 |
| 15. | "Assassin Fight / Bourne Almost Leaves" | 4:30 |
| 16. | "Wombosi at Morgue" | 1:50 |
| 17. | "Love Scene" | 1:33 |
| 18. | "Love Scene" (Alternate Version) | 1:38 |
| 19. | "Hotel Regina" | 2:17 |
| 20. | "The Investigation" | 1:44 |
| 21. | "The Investigation" (Alternate Version) | 1:30 |
| 22. | "Wombosi Dead" | 2:30 |
| 23. | "Taxi / Pins" | 3:48 |
| 24. | "Conklin and Abbot Argue" | 1:00 |
| 25. | "Bourne Watches Kids Sleep" | 1:33 |
| 26. | "Bourne Watches Kids Sleep" (Alternate Version) | 1:54 |
| 27. | "Get in the Basement" | 2:58 |
| 28. | "Bourne Phones" | 3:08 |
| 29. | "Pont Neuf" | 3:46 |
| 30. | "Conklin Killed" | 1:34 |
| 31. | "Got Any ID?" | 1:32 |
| Total length: | | 75:19 |

== Legacy ==
Following the Bourne Identity, Powell continued his collaboration with Liman on Mr. & Mrs. Smith (2005), Jumper (2008), Fair Game (2010) and Locked Down (2021). Powell would also work on the future instalments of the Jason Bourne franchise, except for The Bourne Legacy (2012) which was composed by James Newton Howard. Powell recalled that his music for The Bourne Identity had been copied by numerous composers for spy action films, which disappointed him.

== Personnel ==
Credits adapted from liner notes:

- Music composed and produced by – John Powell
- Additional music – Joel J. Richard, McKee Smith
- Musical arrangements and programming – John Powell, Joel J. Richard, McKee Smith
- Protools operator – TJ Lindgren
- Sound loop creation – Bunny Andrews
- Compiler – Dan Lerner
- Recordist – John Rodd, Paul Wertheimer
- Recording – Alan Meyerson
- Mixing – Alan Meyerson, Tom Hardisty
- Mastering – Patricia Sullivan-Fourstar
- Music editor – Dan Lerner, Bunny Andrews
- Executive producer – Robert Townson, Julianne Jordan
- Musical assistance – Daniel Lerner, Joel "Starfabric" Richard
- Copyist – Julian Bratolyubov
- Executive in charge of music for Universal Pictures – Harry Garfield, Kathy Nelson
- Music business affairs for Universal Pictures – Philip Cohen

Orchestra

- Performer – Hollywood Studio Symphony
- Orchestration – Bruce Fowler, Suzette Moriarty
- Concertmaster – Endre Granat
- Orchestra conductor – Pete Anthony
- Orchestra contractor – Sandy DeCrescent

Instruments

- Bassoon – Michael O'Donovan
- Cello – Cecilia Tsan, Christina Soule, David Shamban, Jodi Burnett, Kevan Torfeh, Roger Lebow, Rowena Hammill, Steve Richards, Victor Lawrence, David Speltz
- Double bass – Arni Egilsson, Chris Kollgaard, Neil Garber, Nicolas Philippon, Paul Zibits, Steve Edelman
- Guitar – George Doering, Joel Richard, John Powell
- Percussions – Mike Fisher
- Piano – TJ Lindgren
- Viola – Carrie Holzman-Little, Karen Van Shant, Karie Prescott, Keith Greene, Kira Blumberg, Maria Newman, Matthew Funes, Robert Becker, Robert Berg, Shanti Randall, Steven Gordon, Brian Dembow
- Violin – Aimee Kreston, Alan Grunfeld, Armen Movsessian, Barbra Porter, Berj Garabedian, Charlie Bisharat, Christine Frank, Darius Campos, Eric Hosler, Galina Golovin, Jay Rosen, Jennifer Walton, Julian Hallmark, Karen Jones, Kevin Connolly, Liane Mautner, Marc Sazer, Marina Manukian, Michele Richards, Miwako Watanabe, Patricia Johnson, Polly Sweeney, Robert Brosseau, Roger Wilkie, Ronald Folsom, Shalini Vijayan, Tiffany Hu, Endre Granat
- Vocals – Cameron Stone, Edward Cole, Leroi Holmes Jnr., Lionel Cole
