= Frostbite (soundtrack) =

Soundtrack album by Anthony Lledo
- Released: December 12, 2006
- Genre: Soundtrack
- Length: 32:05
- Label: MovieScore Media
- Producer: Anthony Lledo

Anthony Lledo chronology
Frostbite (2006)	Legends of Chima (2013)

Frostbite is the soundtrack to the 2006 Anders Banke film of the same name. The orchestral score was composed by Anthony Lledo and released in 2006 on MovieScore Media.

== Track listing ==
Music composed by Anthony Lledo.

No.	Title	Length
1.	"War"	1:23
2.	"Ukraine 1944"	0:53
3.	"Abandoned Cabin"	1:34
4.	"The Vampire"	2:08
5.	"The Coffin"	3:35
6.	"Saga"	0:31
7.	"Stake Through the Heart"	0:48
8.	"Talking Dog / The Kitchen"	2:03
9.	"Rufus, Lord of Evil"	0:30
10.	"Beckert’s Story"	4:48
11.	"Sebastian’s Transformation"	1:46
12.	"Lamppost Lunch"	0:42
13.	"You Are One of Us"	1:39
14.	"They’re All Dead"	1:43
15.	"The Hunt"	2:19
16.	"There You Are…"	0:56
17.	"Like an X"	0:41
18.	"Annika Stabs Beckert"	0:42
19.	"Hit the Lights"	0:57
20.	"Get the Hell Out of Here"	0:41
21.	"Maria"	0:45
22.	"Frostbite Trailer"	1:01

== Credits ==
- Anthony Lledo - Composer, Score Producer, Orchestration
- Allan Wilson - Conductor
- Torben Kjær - Orchestration
- Svenn Skipper - Orchestration
- Rasmus Hansen - Orchestration
- Zacharias Celinder – Vocal Soloist
- Rasmus Kristensen - Vocal Soloist
- Peter Fuchs - Recording engineer and Mixer
- Martin Roller - Assistant Recording engineer
- Torsten Larsen - Choir Recording engineer
- Paul Talkington - Orchestra Contractor
- Magnus Paulsson - Executive Album Producer

== Awards and reception ==
The score won the 'Best Score' award at Screamfest Horror Film Festival in Hollywood, Los Angeles 2006 and received widely critical acclaim. Veteran film music journalist Randall Larson included the score in his annual Best Film Scores of 2006 list.

== Concert performance ==
Malmö Symphony Orchestra performed music from Frostbite at the 2006 Swedish Film Music concert.
