= Spider-Man (score) =

Spider-Man: Original Motion Picture Score

Film score by Danny Elfman
- Released: June 4, 2002
- Length: 44:55
- Label: Columbia

Danny Elfman chronology
Sleepy Hollow (1999)	Spider-Man: Original Motion Picture Score (2002)	Men in Black II (2002)

Spider-Man: Original Motion Picture Score is the soundtrack for the 2002 film Spider-Man directed by Sam Raimi. It was released on June 4, 2002. The score combines traditional orchestration, ethnic percussion and electronic elements. Its distinct ethnic characteristics are credited to its composer, Danny Elfman, who spent a year in Africa studying its unique percussive variety. A CD release of the score came out from Sony's label.

== Track listing ==
All music is composed by Danny Elfman.

No.	Title	Length
1.	"Main Title"	3:31
2.	"Transformations"	3:31
3.	"Costume Montage"	1:19
4.	"Revenge"	6:13
5.	"First Web"	0:56
6.	"Something's Different"	1:17
7.	"City Montage"	1:50
8.	"Alone"	1:37
9.	"Parade Attack"	3:54
10.	"Specter of the Goblin"	3:47
11.	"Revelation"	2:32
12.	"Getting Through"	2:05
13.	"Final Confrontation"	7:19
14.	"Farewell"	3:11
15.	"End Credits"	1:54

== Re-release ==
In 2022, La-La Land Records announced that it would release an expanded version of the Spider-Man score on November 29, coinciding with the film's 20th anniversary. The album features several previously unreleased and alternate tracks and cues.

== Charts ==
Chart performance
Chart (2022)	Peak position
UK Soundtrack Albums (Official Charts)	24
