= Men in Black II =

2002 film by Barry Sonnenfeld

- Theatrical release poster
- Directed by: Barry Sonnenfeld
- Screenplay by: Robert Gordon; Barry Fanaro
- Story by: Robert Gordon
- Based on: The Men in Black by Lowell Cunningham
- Produced by: Walter F. Parkes; Laurie MacDonald
- Starring: Tommy Lee Jones; Will Smith; Lara Flynn Boyle; Johnny Knoxville; Rosario Dawson; Tony Shalhoub; Rip Torn
- Cinematography: Greg Gardiner
- Edited by: Richard Pearson; Steven Weisberg
- Music by: Danny Elfman
- Production companies: Columbia Pictures; Amblin Entertainment; MacDonald/Parkes Productions
- Distributed by: Sony Pictures Releasing
- Release date: July 3, 2002
- Running time: 88 minutes
- Country: United States
- Language: English
- Budget: $140 million
- Box office: $445 million

Men in Black II (stylized as MIIB in promotional material) is a 2002 American science fiction action comedy film based on the Marvel Comics series of a similar name based on the conspiracy theory. Produced by Columbia Pictures and Amblin Entertainment in association with MacDonald/Parkes Productions, and distributed by Sony Pictures Releasing, it is the sequel to Men in Black (1997) and the second installment in the Men in Black film series. The film was directed by Barry Sonnenfeld from a screenplay by Robert Gordon and Barry Fanaro, and it stars Tommy Lee Jones and Will Smith, with Lara Flynn Boyle, Johnny Knoxville, Rosario Dawson, Tony Shalhoub, and Rip Torn in supporting roles. It also featured Michael Jackson's last feature film appearance before he died in 2009. In the film, the emergence of an alien threat reunites Kevin Brown / Agent K (Jones) and James Darrell Edwards III / Agent J (Smith).

Development for a sequel film began following the box office success of the original; Jones, Smith, and Sonnenfeld's returns were confirmed by 2001, and David Koepp was initially hired to write the screenplay. Koepp then left production to work on Spider-Man (2002) and was replaced by Gordon, who developed the script and story further. Fanaro was later brought in to perform some final rewrites to Gordon's treatment. Principal photography began on June 11, 2001, and lasted until that September, taking place primarily in New York City; filming was delayed, and several scenes were reworked following the September 11 attacks that month. The film's soundtrack contained the theme song "Black Suits Comin' (Nod Ya Head)", performed by Smith. Aside from this song, composer Danny Elfman, who scored the first film, returned to compose its sequel.

Men in Black II premiered at Mann Village Theater in Westwood, Los Angeles on June 26, 2002, and was theatrically released in the United States on July 3. It received mixed reviews from critics, who deemed it inferior to its predecessor but praised Jones's and Smith's performances and action sequences. It was a financial success, grossing $445 million worldwide and becoming the fifth-highest-grossing film of 2002. Its sequel, Men in Black 3, was released in 2012 to an improved critical and commercial response.

== Plot ==
In 1978, a group of aliens called the Zarthans, led by Princess Lauranna, travel to Earth and beg the Men in Black (MIB) organization for help in guarding a powerful item called the Light of Zartha before a shapeshifting alien called Serleena gets it. Due to their neutral status, the MIB refuse before Agent K seemingly sends the Light off-world in a rocket. Enraged, Serleena kills Lauranna and leaves to pursue it.

In 2002, five years after joining the MIB, (Note: As depicted in Men in Black (1997).) Agent J has become one of its top agents, but has developed a reputation for neuralyzing partners he feels are emotionally unfit to cope with the work. Serleena returns after being informed by a two-headed alien named Scrad and Charlie that the Light is still on Earth and forces them to help her find it. She later kills a Zarthan pizzeria owner named Ben, who refuses to tell her where the Light is. While investigating Ben's murder, J develops an attraction towards a witness named Laura. J breaks MIB protocol and chooses not to neuralyze her. Investigating further, J later discovers that K was the agent in charge of the case.

Due to K having been neuralyzed five years ago before retiring, no one knows where the Light is. J finds K serving as postmaster of Truro, Massachusetts and convinces him to return after exposing his coworkers as disguised extraterrestrials. J brings K to MIB's headquarters to use the deneuralyzer machine to restore his memories. However, Serleena, Scrad, and Charlie attack the facility, forcing the pair to escape and find Jack Jeebs, an alien pawnbroker who built an illegal deneuralyzer. Although the machine works, K fails to remember the Light, as he had neuralyzed himself and those memories have not returned. Nonetheless, he left himself a series of clues. After locating a locker key at the pizzeria and leaving Laura with a group of alien worms for her safety, the pair head to Grand Central Terminal, where they find a locker containing a society of tiny aliens who worship K as their deity and developed a religion around a video store membership card.

Visiting the store, the owner shows them a fictionalized version of the MIB's previous encounter with the Light and Serleena. K remembers what really happened, but only tells J that the Light must leave Earth within one hour or Earth will be destroyed. J believes the Light is Laura's bracelet, which is now glowing. The pair head back to the worms, only to learn Serleena attacked them and kidnapped Laura. Joined by the worms, the agents infiltrate and retake MIB headquarters and rescue Laura before escaping to return the Light. Serleena chases them across Manhattan until J tricks her into being eaten by Jeff, a gigantic worm-like alien living in the subway.

Guided by Laura's bracelet, the agents locate a Zarthan transport ship, where K reveals Laura is the Light and Lauranna's daughter before convincing J to let her go so she can save Earth and Zartha. As Laura is about to leave, Serleena makes another attempt at seizing her, having assimilated Jeff, but K and J kill Serleena. K uses a giant neuralyzer hidden in the Statue of Liberty's torch to erase New York's populace's memories of Serleena's actions.

J grieves his lost relationship with Laura. In the locker room, K and Zed provide relationship advice. K also puts the society of the locker in J's personal locker, before revealing that their world is also contained in a locker.

== Cast ==
- Tommy Lee Jones as Kevin Brown / Agent K, a decommissioned senior MIB agent and the only person who used to know how to stop the latest threat to Earth's safety
- Will Smith as James Darrel Edwards III / Agent J, still on active duty with the MIB; he is not satisfied with the partners assigned to him and keeps neuralyzing them.
- Rip Torn as Chief Zed, the head of the MIB
- Lara Flynn Boyle as Serleena, a shapeshifting Kylothian alien who comes to Earth to find a vital power source used by her race's enemies
- Johnny Knoxville as Scrad and Charlie, a humanoid alien (Scrad) with a second small head (Charlie) on a stalk protruding from his neck, who does Serleena's dirty work
- Rosario Dawson as Laura Vasquez, a young woman who turns out to be the long-lost alien princess from Zartha and the power source sought by Serleena
- Tony Shalhoub as Jack Jeebs, an alien pawn shop owner who uses a home-built machine to "de-neuralyze" K and restore his memory
- Patrick Warburton as Agent T, partnered with J, who has an incident with Jeff, a gigantic worm-like alien living in the subway, leading to J neuralyzing him and throwing him out of MIB
- Jack Kehler as Ben, a Zarthan pizzeria owner
- David Cross as Newton, a video store owner
- Colombe Jacobsen as Hailey, a video store clerk
- John Alexander as Jarra, an alien criminal who had tried to steal the Earth's ozone
- Michael Jackson as Himself, asking to be made Agent M
- Martha Stewart as Herself (cameo)
- Peter Graves as Himself, host of "Mysteries in History"
- Linda Kim as Princess Lauranna, an alien from Zartha and the mother of Laura
- Paige Brooks as "Mysteries in History" Lauranna
- Nick Cannon as MIB Autopsy Agent
- Biz Markie as Alien Beatboxer
- Jeremy Howard as Postal Sorting Alien
- Martin Klebba as Family Child Alien
- Peter Spellos as Captain Larry Bridgewater
- Doug Jones as Joey

=== Voices ===
- Tim Blaney as Frank the Pug
- Brad Abrell as Worm Guy
- Greg Ballora as Worm Guy
- Thom Fountain as Worm Guy
- Carl Johnson as Worm Guy
- Richard Pearson as Gordy
- Frank Welker as Jeff, a 600 foot alien worm.

== Production ==
Despite some initial involvement from David Koepp (who left to work on Panic Room and Spider-Man), the script was written by Robert Gordon and later revised by Barry Fanaro, who added pop culture references, something which Gordon had deliberately avoided. Barry Sonnenfeld took issue with the producers' focus on the love story between Will Smith's and Rosario Dawson's characters, saying that "I learned on Wild Wild West that audiences didn't want to see Will as the straight man. And until Tommy comes back into the movie, by definition, Will's the straight man". Fanaro condensed the first part of the film and brought Agent K in earlier. Famke Janssen was originally cast as Serleena, but dropped out due to personal issues, and Lara Flynn Boyle was hired to replace her. Michael Jackson wanted to be in the film; Sonnenfield initially wanted Jackson to make a cameo appearance as an alien but he refused, as he wanted to cameo in the MIB suit, which convinced Sonnenfield.

Principal photography began on June 11, 2001, and ended on September 23, 2001. The climax of the story was originally filmed against a backdrop of the twin towers of the original World Trade Center; but after the September 11 attacks, the climactic scene was completely redone to being at the Statue of Liberty. Other scenes incorporating views of the twin towers likewise were edited, or reshot. Filming for Men in Black II was also suspended due to the attacks.

Supervising sound editor Skip Lievsay used a Synclavier to recreate and improve the original recording of the neuralyzer sound effect from the first film (which was the sound of a strobe flash as it recycles) by removing some distortion. For some of the scenes with the Serleena creature, the sound crew "took tree branches, put them inside a rubber membrane and pushed that around and added some water." For the special effects scene where the subway train is attacked by Jeff the Worm, a specially designed vise was used to crush a subway car and make it look as if it had been bitten in half.

Unlike the first film and the 1997 animated series, Men in Black II did not feature Agent L, who was played by Linda Fiorentino, even though the character had a prominent role in the latter. It was briefly mentioned in the film that Agent J had her neuralyzed because she wanted to go back to working at the morgue. According to producer Laurie MacDonald, the studio did not consider her a permanent character in the franchise and decided to remove her from the sequel. There were also reports suggesting that Fiorentino was difficult to work with and supposedly Jones' refusal to work with her.

== Music ==
The motion picture soundtrack to Men In Black II was released on June 25, 2002, by Columbia Records.

== Release ==
=== Marketing ===
In October 2001, the first photos for Men in Black II were revealed. A teaser trailer premiered in December 2001, which was attached to the screenings of The Lord of the Rings: The Fellowship of the Ring and Ali. Just four months later in April 2002, a new trailer was released online. It made its debut in theaters on May 3 with the release of Spider-Man.

Burger King began selling a variety of kids' meal toys themed to the film at their restaurants. Several action figures were also released by Hasbro at the North American International Toy Fair event.

A video game partly based on the film was released in 2002, titled Men in Black II: Alien Escape.

=== Home media ===
Men In Black II was released on DVD and VHS on November 26, 2002, and on Blu-ray on May 1, 2012. It came with an alternate ending where J is sent to the homeworld of the aliens from Grand Central Station.

In the United Kingdom, the film was watched by 710,000 viewers on subscription television channel Sky Movies 1 in 2004, making it the year's eighth most-watched film on subscription television.

The entire Men in Black series was released on 4K UHD Blu-ray on December 5, 2017.

== Reception ==
=== Box office ===
Released theatrically on July 3, 2002, Men in Black II earned $18.5 million on its opening day, making it the third-highest Wednesday opening, behind Star Wars: Episode I – The Phantom Menace and Jurassic Park III. The film would go on to make $52.1 million during its opening weekend, becoming the highest Fourth of July three-day opening weekend, surpassing its predecessor Men in Black. Within five days, it grossed $87.1 million, breaking Independence Day's record for having the biggest five-day Fourth of July Wednesday opening. Men in Black II would hold the record for having the largest Fourth of July opening weekend until it was surpassed by Spider-Man 2 in 2004. That same year, I, Robot tied the record for having the highest opening weekend for a Will Smith film. Both films remained so until 2007 when they were taken by I Am Legend. The film was ranked number one at the box office upon opening, beating out The Powerpuff Girls Movie, Like Mike, Lilo & Stitch, Mr. Deeds and Minority Report. The film held the number one position in its second weekend with revenue of $24.4 million, declining 53.2% from the previous weekend and outgrossing newcomers Road to Perdition, Reign of Fire, Halloween: Resurrection and The Crocodile Hunter: Collision Course. The third weekend saw a 40.4% decrease, with a box office of $14.6 million, coming in at number three below Road to Perdition and Stuart Little 2.

In its fourth weekend, the film was in fourth place, with revenue of $8.4 million. Men in Black II fell out of the top ten after five weekends. After sixty-two days of release in North America, Men in Black II had grossed $190.4 million. 43.1% of the film's worldwide revenue of $445 million came from North America.

Grossing $1.2 million, Men in Black II had the second-highest opening weekend in Taiwan, behind The Mummy Returns. In France, the film made $10 million during its opening weekend, which was the country's second-highest of all time, after Harry Potter and the Sorcerer's Stone. Then, it collected $3.1 million in Mexico, making it the fifth-highest opening weekend in the country, trailing the latter film, Spider-Man, Ice Age and Dinosaur.

=== Critical response ===
On review aggregator Rotten Tomatoes, Men in Black II has an approval rating of 38% based on 196 reviews, with an average score of 5.3/10. The website's critical consensus reads, "Lacking the freshness of the first movie, MIB 2 recycles elements from its predecessor with mixed results." On Metacritic, the film has a score of 49 based on 37 reviews, indicating "mixed or average reviews". Audiences polled by CinemaScore gave the film an average grade of "B+" on an A+ to F scale, the same score as the first film.

A. O. Scott of The New York Times said, "Within the trivial, ingratiating scope of its ambition... the sequel is pleasant enough" and, noting the vast array of aliens designed by Rick Baker, said that the film "really belongs to Mr. Baker." A review in The Hindu called the film "worth viewing once." A review from Digital Media FX magazine praised the spaceships as looking realistic, but criticized many of the simpler visual effects, such as the moving backgrounds composited behind the car windows using blue-screen (which it called a throwback to the special effects of earlier decades). In August 2002, Entertainment Weekly placed the Worm Guys among their list of the best CG characters, and said that enlarging the roles of Frank the Pug and the Worm Guys in Men in Black II was beneficial for the "tiring franchise."

=== Accolades ===
The film was nominated for both Best Science Fiction Film at the Saturn Awards and "Best Visual Effects in a Visual Effects Driven Motion Picture" and "Best Performance by an Actor in an Effects Film" at the Visual Effects Society Award, but lost to both Minority Report and The Lord of the Rings: The Two Towers respectively. The film also earned a Razzie Award nomination for Lara Flynn Boyle as Worst Supporting Actress, losing to Madonna in Die Another Day.

== Sequels ==
A sequel titled Men in Black 3, was released in 2012.

A fourth installment, Men in Black: International, was released in 2019.
