= Frostbite (comics) =

In comics, Frostbite may refer to:

- Frostbite (G.I. Joe), a character who has appeared in a number of G.I. Joe comics
- Frostbite, a character from Wildstorm Comics
- Frostbite (Marvel Comics), a Marvel Comics character and enemy of Iron Man
- Frostbite, a Marvel Comics character who was a member of the team in X-Men 2099
- Frostbite, a character who appeared in DC Comics' Young Heroes in Love
- Frostbite, a DC Comics character who appeared in Superman: A Tale of Five Cities
- Frostbite (Sanna Strand), a Marvel Comics character who was introduced in Battleworld Runaways

== See also ==
- Frostbite (disambiguation)
