= Anthony Lledo =

Danish composer

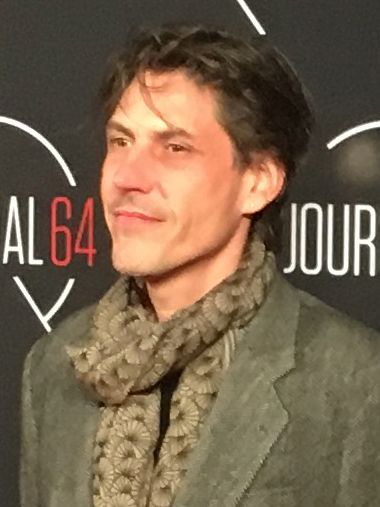
- Anthony Lledo

Background information
- Born: Anthony Lledo; January 11, 1972 (age 54); Copenhagen, Denmark
- Occupations: Composer, musician
- Website: anthonylledo.com

Anthony Lledo (born 11 January 1972) is a Danish composer.

He has composed music for several films and tv-series and made his feature film debut with the score for the Swedish film Frostbite. His dark thematic orchestral score received widely critically acclaim and won the Best Score Award at the Screamfest Horror Film Festival in Hollywood, Los Angeles. Music from Frostbite was later performed in concert by the Malmö Symphony Orchestra.

In 2008, Lledo moved to Los Angeles upon being invited by film composer Harry Gregson-Williams, and did additional music and arrangements for several major films, including X-Men Origins: Wolverine, Prince of Persia: The Sands of Time, DreamWorks' Shrek Forever After, Ben Affleck's The Town, Cowboys & Aliens, and the Tony Scott films The Taking of Pelham 1 2 3 and Unstoppable.

Lledo has scored the four-time Emmy Award winning Civil War film Gettysburg (exec. produced by Ridley Scott and Tony Scott), the horror/thriller Darkroom starring Kaylee DeFer and Elisabeth Röhm, as well the animated fantasy TV series Legends of Chima which received widely critical acclaim and was named one of the best scores for television in 2013 by several reviewers – winning Tracksounds Cue Award for Best Television Score.

In 2018 Lledo and composer Mikkel Maltha composed the score for the feature film The Purity of Vengeance (Journal 64), the fourth installment of the Department Q film series directed by Christoffer Boe based on the successful books by Danish writer Jussi Adler-Olsen. The film topped the chart as the most watched film of 2018 in Denmark and broke record as the highest-ever grossing local film in Danish cinemas. Lledo also composed the score for Daniel Prince’s short film Invaders. The score won several awards including the 2018 FIMUCINEMA Award for Best Original Score for a Short Film at the Tenerife International Film Music Festival FIMUCITÉ.

Lledo's credits also includes the TV series Those Who Kill (Den Som Dræber), A Happy Day directed by Hisham Zaman, A Taste of Hunger (Smagen af Sult) starring Nikolaj Coster-Waldau (Game of Thrones) and Katrine Greis-Rosenthal (Lykke-Per), the TV series Face to Face (Forhøret, 2019–2023) starring Ulrich Thomsen, Lars Mikkelsen, Trine Dyrholm and Nikolaj Lie Kaas as well as the Danish nature series Wild and Wonderful Denmark (Vilde Vidunderlige Danmark), which was recorded and later performed live in concert by the Danish National Symphony Orchestra.

== Discography ==
- Wild and Wonderful Denmark (Expanded Edition) (2024)
- A Happy Day (2023)
- Forhøret 2 (Face to Face 2) (2021)
- Wild and Wonderful Denmark (2020)
- Gettysburg (2020)
- Forhøret (Face to Face) (2019)
- The Purity of Vengeance (Journal 64) (2018)
- Legends of Chima Vol. 2 (2015)
- Legends of Chima (2013)
- Frostbite (2006)
