= John Rodd =

John Rodd is a freelance music recording, mixing and mastering engineer. He is best known for film score recording and mixing.

== Career ==
His work include credits with The Rolling Stones, Porno for Pyros, Eric Clapton, The Red Hot Chili Peppers, Michael Jackson, Whitney Houston, Ry Cooder, Madonna, Boyz II Men and many orchestral sessions.

Films worked on while on staff as Orchestral Scoring Recordist at the Newman Scoring Stage at 20th Century Fox include I, Robot, The Last Samurai, Spider-Man 2, Pirates of the Caribbean, The Matrix (trilogy), Cast Away, X-2, Jurassic Park III, The Bourne Identity, Road to Perdition and The Sixth Sense.

Rodd moved into freelance work in 2004 after leaving the Newman Scoring Stage and continues to work on orchestral projects, but has extensive experience recording and mixing all genres of music for film, TV, gaming and CD.

He works at a wide variety of recording and mixing studios, including his own facility. His private studio is well equipped with an extensive collection of boutique outboard hardware, Pro Tools HD, Digital Performer and Logic for stereo and surround music recording, mixing and mastering work.

== Other activities ==
Rodd is very active in the film scoring community in Los Angeles, volunteering his time to provide educational workshops and lectures for the Society of Composers and Lyricists, The ASCAP Scoring Workshop, and The Composers Expo. Rodd and his wife live on the westside of Los Angeles.

== Credits & Awards ==
For a partial list of Credits: https://www.imdb.com/name/nm1116807/

- 2007 nomination as "Best Score Mixer" by the Film and TV Music Awards.
