= MovieScore Media =

Swedish record label

MovieScore Media is a Swedish record label devoted to original film scores, founded in 2005 by former journalist Mikael Carlsson. The label has produced over 750 soundtrack albums, focusing primarily on music composed by up and coming composers and from smaller, independent feature films. Among prolific Hollywood composers who had their first albums released by MovieScore Media are Benjamin Wallfisch, Daniel Pemberton and Pinar Toprak. However, the label has also released soundtracks by more established composers, including Academy Award-winning composers Dario Marianelli and Gabriel Yared, Academy Award-nominated composers George Fenton, Marco Beltrami, Patrick Doyle and Michael Kamen, Emmy Award-winning composers Basil Poledouris and John Lunn, as well as Emmy-nominated composers Angelo Badalamenti and Rob Lane. The label has licensed distribution rights for music owned by bigger studios and companies, such as Warner Bros., BBC and Constantin Film.

Between 2011 and 2019, MovieScore Media ran a sub-label devoted exclusively to music from horror films, Screamworks Records, with the release of Stake Land by Jeff Grace as its first album. In 2021, MovieScore Media created two sub-labels, Reality Bytes (devoted exclusively to music from documentary films) and Short Cuts (presenting original scores written for short films).

In a special series devoted to non-current, previously unreleased scores, the Discovery Collection, MovieScore Media has released over 20 albums.

In terms of distribution strategies, MovieScore Media was first introduced as an online label dedicated to digital distribution, primarily via Apple's iTunes Store, only. In 2007, the label expanded its business to include limited edition of CDs in addition to the established digital distribution. In 2021, the label's catalogue was acquired by Symphonic Distribution for worldwide digital distribution. Since 2020, MovieScore Media sub-licenses its albums for CD and vinyl distribution to other labels, including Quartet Records and Music Box Records. In 2023, the label began to offer selected titles in the CD on demand format.

MovieScore Media has been nominated for the 'Film Music Record Label of the Year' award by the International Film Music Critics Association 15 times. Screamworks Records' release of Ryan Shore's soundtrack for The Shrine, received a 2012 Grammy Award nomination for Best Score Soundtrack for Visual Media.
