= List of Amblin Entertainment films =

This is a list of films produced by American independent production company Amblin Entertainment, currently based in Universal City, California, and as of January 2026, New York City, New York. Amblin Entertainment was established in 1975 by filmmaker Steven Spielberg, joining five years later by Kathleen Kennedy and Frank Marshall.

== Films ==
=== Released films ===
==== 1970s-1980s ====
Title	Director(s)	Release date	American distributor	International distributor	Notes/Co-production company(s)
I Wanna Hold Your Hand	Robert Zemeckis	April 21, 1978	Universal Pictures	Cinema International Corporation	uncredited
Used Cars	Robert Zemeckis	July 11, 1980	Columbia Pictures		uncredited
Continental Divide	Michael Apted	September 18, 1981	Universal Pictures	Cinema International Corporation	as Amblin Productions; first film to give the company credit
Poltergeist	Tobe Hooper	June 4, 1982	Metro-Goldwyn-Mayer	United International Pictures	uncredited
E.T. the Extra-Terrestrial	Steven Spielberg	June 11, 1982	Universal Pictures	United International Pictures	Amblin Entertainment uncredited
Twilight Zone: The Movie	John Landis; Steven Spielberg; Joe Dante; George Miller	June 24, 1983	Warner Bros. Pictures		Amblin Entertainment uncredited
Gremlins	Joe Dante	June 8, 1984	Warner Bros. Pictures		N/A
Fandango	Kevin Reynolds	January 25, 1985	Warner Bros. Pictures		N/A
The Goonies	Richard Donner	June 7, 1985	Warner Bros. Pictures		N/A
Back to the Future	Robert Zemeckis	July 3, 1985	Universal Pictures	United International Pictures	U-Drive Productions
Young Sherlock Holmes	Barry Levinson	December 4, 1985	Paramount Pictures	United International Pictures	N/A
The Color Purple	Steven Spielberg	December 18, 1985	Warner Bros. Pictures		The Guber-Peters Company; Quincy Jones Productions
The Money Pit	Richard Benjamin	March 26, 1986	Universal Pictures	United International Pictures	U-Drive Productions
An American Tail	Don Bluth	November 21, 1986	Universal Pictures	United International Pictures	Sullivan Bluth Studios; David Kirschner Productions; U-Drive Productions
Harry and the Hendersons	William Dear	June 5, 1987	Universal Pictures	United International Pictures	U-Drive Productions
Innerspace	Joe Dante	July 1, 1987	Warner Bros. Pictures		The Guber-Peters Company
Empire of the Sun	Steven Spielberg	December 9, 1987	Warner Bros. Pictures		Robert Shapiro Productions
Batteries Not Included	Matthew Robbins	December 18, 1987	Universal Pictures	United International Pictures	U-Drive Productions
Who Framed Roger Rabbit	Robert Zemeckis	June 22, 1988	Buena Vista Pictures Distribution		Touchstone Pictures; Silver Screen Partners III
The Land Before Time	Don Bluth	November 18, 1988	Universal Pictures	United International Pictures	Lucasfilm; Sullivan Bluth Studios; U-Drive Productions
Dad	Gary David Goldberg	October 27, 1989	Universal Pictures	United International Pictures	Ubu Productions
Back to the Future Part II	Robert Zemeckis	November 22, 1989	Universal Pictures	United International Pictures	U-Drive Productions
Always	Steven Spielberg	December 22, 1989	Universal Pictures	United International Pictures	United Artists; U-Drive Productions

==== 1990s ====
Title	Director(s)	Release date	American distributor	International distributor	Notes/Co-production company(s)
Joe Versus the Volcano	John Patrick Shanley	March 9, 1990	Warner Bros. Pictures		N/A
Back to the Future Part III	Robert Zemeckis	May 25, 1990	Universal Pictures	United International Pictures	U-Drive Productions
Gremlins 2: The New Batch	Joe Dante	June 15, 1990	Warner Bros. Pictures		Michael Finnell Productions
Arachnophobia	Frank Marshall	July 18, 1990	Buena Vista Pictures Distribution		Hollywood Pictures; Tangled Web Productions
Cape Fear	Martin Scorsese	November 13, 1991	Universal Pictures	United International Pictures	Cappa Films; Tribeca Productions
An American Tail: Fievel Goes West	Phil Nibbelink and Simon Wells	November 22, 1991	Universal Pictures	United International Pictures	credited under Amblimation
Hook	Steven Spielberg	December 11, 1991	TriStar Pictures		N/A
Noises Off*	Peter Bogdanovich	March 20, 1992	Buena Vista Pictures Distribution		Touchstone Pictures; Nothing On Productions; Touchwood Pacific Partners
A Far Off Place*	Mikael Salomon	March 12, 1993	Buena Vista Pictures Distribution		Walt Disney Pictures; Touchwood Pacific Partners
Jurassic Park	Steven Spielberg	June 11, 1993	Universal Pictures	United International Pictures	N/A
We're Back! A Dinosaur's Story	Dick Zondag, Ralph Zondag, Phil Nibbelink, and Simon Wells	November 24, 1993	Universal Pictures	United International Pictures	credited under Amblimation
A Dangerous Woman*	Stephen Gyllenhaal	December 3, 1993	Universal Pictures	World Films, Inc.	Gramercy Pictures (distributing label); Island World; Rollercoaster Productions
Schindler's List	Steven Spielberg	December 15, 1993	Universal Pictures	United International Pictures	N/A
The Flintstones	Brian Levant	May 27, 1994	Universal Pictures	United International Pictures	Hanna-Barbera Productions
The Little Rascals*	Penelope Spheeris	August 5, 1994	Universal Pictures	United International Pictures	King World Productions
Little Giants*	Duwayne Dunham	October 14, 1994	Warner Bros. Pictures		under Warner Bros. Family Entertainment
Casper	Brad Silberling	May 26, 1995	Universal Pictures	United International Pictures	The Harvey Entertainment Company
The Bridges of Madison County*	Clint Eastwood	June 2, 1995	Warner Bros. Pictures		Malpaso Productions
To Wong Foo, Thanks for Everything! Julie Newmar*	Beeban Kidron	September 8, 1995	Universal Pictures	United International Pictures	N/A
How to Make an American Quilt*	Jocelyn Moorhouse	October 6, 1995	Universal Pictures	United International Pictures	N/A
Balto	Simon Wells	December 22, 1995	Universal Pictures	United International Pictures	credited under Amblimation
Twister	Jan de Bont	May 10, 1996	Warner Bros. Pictures	Universal Pictures (through United International Pictures)	Constant c Productions
The Trigger Effect*	David Koepp	August 30, 1996	Universal Pictures	United International Pictures	Gramercy Pictures (distributing label)
The Lost World: Jurassic Park	Steven Spielberg	May 23, 1997	Universal Pictures	United International Pictures	N/A
Men in Black	Barry Sonnenfeld	July 2, 1997	Columbia Pictures		Parkes/MacDonald Productions
Amistad	Steven Spielberg	December 10, 1997	Dreamworks Pictures		HBO Pictures
Deep Impact	Mimi Leder	May 8, 1998	Paramount Pictures	DreamWorks Pictures (through CJ Entertainment in China, Hong Kong and Korea and United International Pictures elsewhere)	The Manhattan Project; Zanuck/Brown Productions
Small Soldiers*	Joe Dante	July 10, 1998	DreamWorks Pictures	Universal Pictures (through United International Pictures)	N/A
The Mask of Zorro	Martin Campbell	July 17, 1998	TriStar Pictures		N/A
Saving Private Ryan	Steven Spielberg	July 24, 1998	DreamWorks Pictures and Paramount Pictures	Paramount Pictures (through United International Pictures)	Mark Gordon Productions; The Mutual Film Company
In Dreams*	Neil Jordan	January 15, 1999	DreamWorks Pictures	CJ Entertainment (China, Hong Kong and Korea); United International Pictures (International)	N/A

==== 2000s ====
Title	Director(s)	Release date	American distributor	International distributor	Notes/Co-production company(s)
The Flintstones in Viva Rock Vegas*	Brian Levant	April 28, 2000	Universal Pictures		Hanna-Barbera Productions
A.I. Artificial Intelligence	Steven Spielberg	June 29, 2001	DreamWorks Pictures (home video, television and streaming); Warner Bros. Pictures (all other media)	DreamWorks Pictures (television and streaming); Warner Bros. Pictures (all other media)	DreamWorks Pictures; Stanley Kubrick Productions
Jurassic Park III	Joe Johnston	July 18, 2001	Universal Pictures		N/A
Minority Report	Steven Spielberg	June 21, 2002	DreamWorks Pictures (home video, television and streaming); 20th Century Fox (all other media)	DreamWorks Pictures (television and streaming); 20th Century Fox (all other media)	DreamWorks Pictures; Blue Tulip Productions; Cruise/Wagner Productions Amblin uncredited
Men in Black II	Barry Sonnenfeld	July 3, 2002	Columbia Pictures		Parkes/MacDonald Productions
Catch Me If You Can	Steven Spielberg	December 25, 2002	DreamWorks Pictures		Kemp Company; Parkes/MacDonald Productions; Splendid Pictures
The Terminal	Steven Spielberg	June 18, 2004	DreamWorks Pictures		Parkes/MacDonald Productions
War of the Worlds	Steven Spielberg	June 29, 2005	DreamWorks Pictures (home video, television and streaming); Paramount Pictures (all other media)	DreamWorks Pictures (television and streaming); Paramount Pictures (all other media)	DreamWorks Pictures; Cruise/Wagner Productions
The Legend of Zorro	Martin Campbell	October 28, 2005	Columbia Pictures	Roadshow Entertainment (Australia and Greece); Buena Vista International and Shochiku (Japan); ZON Lusomundo (Portugal, Angola and Mozambique); Forum Film (Poland, Hungary and Israel); Prooptiki (Romania); Myndform (Iceland); StudioCanal (French home media and television); ProSieben (German-language television); RTI (Italian free television); Columbia Pictures (International)	Spyglass Entertainment; Tornado Productions
Memoirs of a Geisha	Rob Marshall	December 9, 2005	Columbia Pictures	Roadshow Entertainment (Australia and Greece); Buena Vista International (UK and Japan, the former under Miramax Films); Shochiku (Japan); StudioCanal (France; through Mars Distribution); Warner Bros. Pictures (Germany, Austria and Switzerland); ProSieben (German-language television); Eagle Pictures (Italy); RTI (Italian free television); ZON Lusomundo (Portugal, Angola and Mozambique); Forum Film (Poland, Hungary and Israel); Prooptiki (Romania); Myndform (Iceland); Paradise Group (CIS); Ster-Kinekor (South Africa); Columbia Pictures (International)	DreamWorks Pictures; Red Wagon Productions; Spyglass Entertainment
Munich	Steven Spielberg	December 23, 2005	Universal Pictures	DreamWorks Pictures	Alliance Atlantis; Barry Mendel Productions; The Kennedy/Marshall Company; Peninsula Films
Monster House	Gil Kenan	July 21, 2006	Columbia Pictures		ImageMovers; Relativity Media
Flags of Our Fathers	Clint Eastwood	October 20, 2006	Paramount Pictures	Warner Bros. Pictures	DreamWorks Pictures; Malpaso Productions
Letters from Iwo Jima	Clint Eastwood	December 20, 2006	Warner Bros. Pictures		DreamWorks Pictures; Malpaso Productions

==== 2010s ====
Title	Director(s)	Release date	American distributor	International distributor	Notes/Co-production company(s)
Hereafter	Clint Eastwood	October 22, 2010	Warner Bros. Pictures		Malpaso Productions; The Kennedy/Marshall Company
Super 8	J. J. Abrams	June 10, 2011	Paramount Pictures		Bad Robot
Real Steel	Shawn Levy	October 7, 2011	Walt Disney Studios Motion Pictures (via Touchstone Pictures)		DreamWorks Pictures; Reliance Entertainment; ImageMovers; 21 Laps Entertainment; Montford Murphy Productions
The Adventures of Tintin	Steven Spielberg	December 21, 2011	Paramount Pictures	Paramount Pictures (UK, Australia, South Africa and Asia excluding India, Japan and South Korea); Toho-Towa (Japan); Lotte Entertainment (South Korea); Columbia Pictures (International)	The Kennedy/Marshall Company; WingNut Films; Nickelodeon Movies
War Horse	Steven Spielberg	December 25, 2011	Walt Disney Studios Motion Pictures (via Touchstone Pictures)	Walt Disney Studios Motion Pictures (via Touchstone Pictures); Reliance Entertainment (India)	DreamWorks Pictures; Reliance Entertainment; The Kennedy/Marshall Company
Men in Black 3	Barry Sonnenfeld	May 25, 2012	Columbia Pictures	Columbia Pictures; Toho-Towa (Japan)	Parkes/MacDonald ImageNation; Media Magik Entertainment; Hemisphere Media Capital
Lincoln	Steven Spielberg	November 16, 2012	Walt Disney Studios Motion Pictures (via Touchstone Pictures)	20th Century Fox; Reliance Entertainment (India)	DreamWorks Pictures; Dune Entertainment; Participant Media; Reliance Entertainment; The Kennedy/Marshall Company
The Hundred-Foot Journey	Lasse Hallström	August 8, 2014	Walt Disney Studios Motion Pictures (via Touchstone Pictures)	Walt Disney Studios Motion Pictures (Latin America, Asia excluding India, Russia and Australia); Reliance Entertainment (India); Constantin Film (Germany, Austria and Switzerland); Entertainment One (U.K. and Benelux); Nordisk Film (Scandinavia); Italia Film (Middle East); Acme (Baltics); Blitz (former Yugoslavia and Albania); Odeon (Greece and Cyprus); Sam Film (Iceland); United King Films (Israel); Leone Film Group, The Space Movies and Universal Pictures (Italy); Monolith Films (Poland); NOS Audiovisuais (Portugal); Tripictures and DeAPlaneta (Spain); Fida Film (Turkey); Metropolitan Filmexport (France); Inter-Film (Ukraine); MediaPro (Czech Republic, Slovakia, Bulgaria, Hungary and Romania); Times Media Films (South Africa)	DreamWorks Pictures; Reliance Entertainment; Participant Media; Image Nation; Harpo Films
Jurassic World	Colin Trevorrow	June 12, 2015	Universal Pictures		Legendary Pictures; The Kennedy/Marshall Company
Bridge of Spies	Steven Spielberg	October 16, 2015	Walt Disney Studios Motion Pictures (via Touchstone Pictures)	20th Century Fox; Reliance Entertainment (India)	DreamWorks Pictures; Participant Media; Reliance Entertainment; Fox 2000 Pictures; Marc Platt Productions; Afterworks Limited; Studio Babelsberg
The BFG	Steven Spielberg	July 1, 2016	Walt Disney Studios Motion Pictures	Walt Disney Studios Motion Pictures (Latin America, Asia excluding India and China, Russia and Australia); Reliance Entertainment (India); Alibaba Pictures and Huaxia Film Distribution (China); Constantin Film (Germany, Austria and Switzerland); Entertainment One (U.K. and Benelux); Nordisk Film (Scandinavia); Italia Film (Middle East); Acme (Baltics); Blitz (former Yugoslavia and Albania); Odeon (Greece); Sam Film (Iceland); United King Films (Israel); Leone Film Group and Medusa Film (Italy); Monolith (Poland); NOS Audiovisuais (Portugal); Tripictures and DeAPlaneta (Spain); Fida Film (Turkey); Metropolitan Filmexport (France); Inter-Film (Ukraine); MediaPro (Czech Republic, Slovakia, Bulgaria, Hungary and Romania); Times Media Films (South Africa)	Walt Disney Pictures; Walden Media; Reliance Entertainment; The Kennedy/Marshall Company; The Roald Dahl Story Company
A Dog's Purpose*	Lasse Hallström	January 27, 2017	Universal Pictures	Universal Pictures (Latin America, Asia excluding India, China, Hong Kong and Korea, and the CIS); Reliance Entertainment (India); Constantin Film (Germany, Austria and Switzerland); Entertainment One (U.K., Australia and Benelux); Nordisk Film (Scandinavia); Italia Film (Middle East); Acme (Baltics); Blitz (former Yugoslavia and Albania); Odeon (Greece and Cyprus); Sam Film (Iceland); United King Films (Israel); Leone Film Group and Eagle Pictures (Italy); Monolith Films (Poland); NOS Audiovisuais (Portugal); Tripictures and DeAPlaneta (Spain); Fida Film (Turkey); Metropolitan Filmexport (France); MediaPro (Czech Republic, Slovakia, Bulgaria, Hungary and Romania); Times Media Films (South Africa); Huaxia Film Distribution (China); Intercontinental Film Distributors (Hong Kong); Home Choice (Korea)	Reliance Entertainment; Walden Media; Pariah Entertainment Group
The Post	Steven Spielberg	December 22, 2017	20th Century Fox	Universal Pictures (Latin America, France, Germany, Austria, Switzerland, the CIS, Japan, Taiwan, Thailand, Malaysia, Singapore and the Philippines); Reliance Entertainment (India); CJ Entertainment (Korea, Vietnam and Indonesia); Entertainment One (U.K., Benelux, Australia and Spain); Nordisk Film (Scandinavia); Italia Film (Middle East); Acme (Baltics); Blitz (former Yugoslavia and Albania); Odeon (Greece and Cyprus); Sam Film (Iceland); United King Films (Israel); Leone Film Group, Rai Cinema and 01 Distribution (Italy); Monolith Films (Poland); NOS Audiovisuais (Portugal); Fida Film (Turkey); MediaPro (Czech Republic, Slovakia, Bulgaria, Hungary and Romania); Times Media Films (South Africa); Intercontinental Film Distributors (Hong Kong)	DreamWorks Pictures; Participant Media; Pascal Pictures; Star Thrower Entertainment
Ready Player One	Steven Spielberg	March 29, 2018	Warner Bros. Pictures		Village Roadshow Pictures; Access Entertainment; RatPac-Dune Entertainment; De Line Pictures; Farah Films & Management
Jurassic World: Fallen Kingdom	J. A. Bayona	June 22, 2018	Universal Pictures		Legendary Pictures; Perfect World Pictures; The Kennedy/Marshall Company
The House with a Clock in Its Walls*	Eli Roth	September 21, 2018	Universal Pictures	Universal Pictures (Latin America, France, Germany, Austria, Switzerland, the CIS, Japan, Taiwan, Thailand, Malaysia, Singapore and the Philippines); Reliance Entertainment (India); CJ Entertainment (Korea, Vietnam and Indonesia); Entertainment One (U.K., Australia, Benelux and Spain); Nordisk Film (Scandinavia); Italia Film (Middle East); Acme (Baltics); Blitz (former Yugoslavia and Albania); Odeon (Greece and Cyprus); Sam Film (Iceland); United King Films (Israel); Leone Film Group, Rai Cinema and 01 Distribution (Italy); Monolith Films (Poland); NOS Audiovisuais (Portugal); Fida Film (Turkey); MediaPro (Czech Republic, Slovakia, Bulgaria, Hungary and Romania); Empire Entertainment (South Africa); Intercontinental Film Distributors (Hong Kong)	Mythology Entertainment
A Dog's Journey*	Gail Mancuso	May 17, 2019	Universal Pictures	Universal Pictures (Latin America, France, the CIS, Japan, Taiwan, Thailand, Malaysia, Singapore and the Philippines); Reliance Entertainment (India); CJ Entertainment (Korea, Vietnam and Indonesia); Alibaba Pictures (China); Entertainment One (U.K., Australia, Benelux and Spain); Constantin Film (Germany, Austria and Switzerland); Nordisk Film (Scandinavia); Italia Film (Middle East); Acme (Baltics); Blitz (former Yugoslavia and Albania); Odeon (Greece and Cyprus); Sam Film (Iceland); United King Films (Israel); Leone Film Group, Rai Cinema and 01 Distribution (Italy); Monolith Films (Poland); NOS Audiovisuais (Portugal); Fida Film (Turkey); MediaPro (Czech Republic, Slovakia, Bulgaria, Hungary and Romania); Empire Entertainment (South Africa); Intercontinental Film Distributors (Hong Kong)	Reliance Entertainment; Walden Media; Alibaba Pictures; Pariah Entertainment Group
Men in Black: International	F. Gary Gray	June 14, 2019	Columbia Pictures; Lotte Entertainment (Korea)		Parkes+MacDonald Productions; Image Nation Abu Dhabi
Cats*	Tom Hooper	December 20, 2019	Universal Pictures		Monumental Pictures; The Really Useful Group; Working Title Films; Perfect World Pictures

==== 2020s ====
Title	Director(s)	Release date	American distributor	International distributor	Notes/Co-production company(s)
Finch*	Miguel Sapochnik	November 5, 2021	Apple TV+		Dutch Angle; ImageMovers; Reliance Entertainment; Alibaba Pictures; Misher Films; Walden Media
West Side Story	Steven Spielberg	December 10, 2021	20th Century Studios		
Jurassic World Dominion	Colin Trevorrow	June 10, 2022	Universal Pictures		Perfect World Pictures; The Kennedy/Marshall Company
The Fabelmans	Steven Spielberg	November 11, 2022	Universal Pictures	Universal Pictures (Latin America, France, Germany, Austria, Switzerland, Spain, the CIS, Japan, Taiwan, Thailand, Malaysia, Singapore and the Philippines); Reliance Entertainment (India); CJ Entertainment (Korea, Vietnam and Indonesia); Entertainment One (U.K.); WW Entertainment (Benelux); StudioCanal (Australia); Nordisk Film (Scandinavia); Italia Film (Middle East); Acme (Baltics); Blitz (former Yugoslavia and Albania); Odeon (Greece and Cyprus); Sam Film (Iceland); United King Films (Israel); Leone Film Group, Rai Cinema and 01 Distribution (Italy); Monolith Films (Poland); NOS Audiovisuais (Portugal); The Moments Entertainment (Turkey); MediaPro (Czech Republic, Slovakia, Bulgaria, Hungary and Romania); Empire Entertainment (South Africa); Intercontinental Film Distributors (Hong Kong)	Reliance Entertainment
Maestro	Bradley Cooper	November 22, 2023	Netflix		Sikelia Productions; Fred Berner Films; Joint Effort
The Color Purple	Blitz Bazawule	December 25, 2023	Warner Bros. Pictures		OW Films; SGS Pictures; Quincy Jones Productions
Twisters	Lee Isaac Chung	July 19, 2024	Universal Pictures	Warner Bros. Pictures	The Kennedy/Marshall Company
Jurassic World Rebirth	Gareth Edwards	July 2, 2025	Universal Pictures		The Kennedy/Marshall Company
The Thursday Murder Club*	Chris Columbus	August 28, 2025	Netflix		Jennifer Todd Pictures; Maiden Voyage Pictures
Hamnet	Chloé Zhao	November 27, 2025	Focus Features	Universal Pictures; Reliance Entertainment (India); Parco (Japan); NOS Audiovisuais (Portugal); Blitz (former Yugoslavia and Albania)	Hera Pictures; Neal Street Productions; Book of Shadows
Disclosure Day	Steven Spielberg	June 12, 2026	Universal Pictures		N/A

=== Upcoming films ===
Title	Director(s)	Release date	Distributor	Co-production companies
The Mandela Catalogue	Alex Kister	June 9, 2028	Amazon MGM Studios	United Artists; Paper Street Pictures
The Flood	Zach Cregger	August 11, 2028	Warner Bros. Pictures	New Line Cinema; Vertigo Entertainment
untitled Gremlins	Chris Columbus	October 6, 2028	Warner Bros. Pictures	26th Street Pictures
The Adventures of Tintin: Prisoners of the Sun	Peter Jackson	TBA	Paramount Pictures	Nickelodeon Movies; WingNut Films; The Kennedy/Marshall Company
Death of a Salesman	Chinonye Chukwu	TBA	Focus Features	Orit Entertainment
Jurassic World 5	TBA	TBA	Universal Pictures	
Long Lost	Zach Lipovsky; Adam Stein	TBA	Universal Pictures	
Something Murdered	Kate Hollowell	TBA	TBA	
Untitled Cola Wars film	Judd Apatow	TBA	Sony Pictures Releasing	Apatow Productions
Untitled Goonies sequel	TBA	TBA	Warner Bros. Pictures	26th Street Pictures; The Donners' Company
Untitled film	Scott Beck and Bryan Woods	TBA	Universal Pictures	Beck/Woods
You Should Be Dancing	Ridley Scott	TBA	Paramount Pictures	Scott Free Productions; GK Films; Sister

Note: The films marked with "*" are ones that Spielberg isn't involved with.

== Short films ==
- Tummy Trouble (1989)
- Roller Coaster Rabbit (1990)
- Trail Mix-Up (1993)
- I'm Mad (Animaniacs short) (1994)
- Battle at Big Rock (2019)

== Direct-to-video ==
- Tiny Toon Adventures: How I Spent My Vacation (1992)
- Wakko's Wish (1999)
