= Spyglass Media Group =

American film and television production company

Spyglass Media Group, LLC
- Trade name: Spyglass Media Group
- Formerly: Spyglass Entertainment (1998–2012)
- Type: Joint venture
- Industry: Film; Television
- Predecessors: Caravan Pictures; The Weinstein Company
- Founded: August 21, 1998; 28 years ago (original); March 13, 2019; 7 years ago (relaunch)
- Founders: Gary Barber (original and relaunch); Roger Birnbaum (original)
- Defunct: February 10, 2012; 14 years ago (original)
- Headquarters: Century City, Los Angeles, California, United States
- Key people: Gary Barber (chairman & CEO); Lauren Whitney (president, TV); Damien Marin (president, worldwide distribution and acquisitions)
- Products: Motion pictures; Television programs
- Owners: Lantern Entertainment (66.1%); Lionsgate Studios (18.9%); Skydance (5%); Regal Global Entertainment (5%); Eagle Pictures (5%)
- Subsidiaries: Artists Road (minority)
- Website: spyglassmediagroup.com

Spyglass Media Group, LLC is an independent film and television production and finance company based in Los Angeles, California.

The company was founded by Gary Barber and Roger Birnbaum on August 21, 1998, as Spyglass Entertainment and became dormant on February 10, 2012. In the wake of the sexual abuse allegations that involved former TWC chairman Harvey Weinstein, Spyglass was relaunched on March 13, 2019 in conjunction with Lantern Entertainment.

== History ==
=== Spyglass Entertainment ===
On August 21, 1998, Gary Barber, former vice chairman and CEO of Morgan Creek Productions, together with Roger Birnbaum, co-founder and former head of Caravan Pictures, founded Spyglass Entertainment. The startup company signed a five-year distribution agreement with the Walt Disney Studios, which took an equity stake.

Birnbaum previously left Caravan at the prompting of then Disney studio chief Joe Roth; with Disney cutting its yearly production output, Roth recommended forming a self-financing production firm similar to New Regency Productions. After Caravan's remaining three films were released, Caravan went inactive.

Its slate of film projects and an initial financial advance of $10 million to $20 million against future overages were also contributed by Disney. Spyglass's operations were formed and based at the Disney lot in Burbank.

Spyglass' initial distribution network spanned multiple territories and formats:

- Their five-year inaugural agreement with Disney, signed into effect on October 22, 1998, covered multiple tangents: all media in the United States, Canada, the United Kingdom, Ireland, Australia, New Zealand, the Middle East, Turkey, Asia excluding Japan, Latin America, the Caribbean, Eastern Europe excluding Poland, Hungary and Bulgaria, theatrical and home video rights in France, the Benelux and Spain, theatrical, home video and pay television rights in Italy, and pay television rights in Japan and South Africa.
- On October 28, 1998, Spyglass and Lusomundo entered a distribution agreement for Portugal as well as African Portuguese-speaking territories, specifically Angola and Mozambique.
- On October 29, 1998, European media conglomerates Kirch Group and Mediaset invested in theatrical, video and television distribution rights to between 15 and 25 films in an agreement lasting for over five years. Territories included in the deal were Germany, Austria, Liechtenstein, Switzerland, Luxembourg, Alto Adige, Italy, San Marino, Vatican City, Monte Carlo, Spain, Andorra, Gibraltar, and the former Soviet Union.
- On November 10, 1998, Spyglass entered a longterm distribution agreement with Svensk Filmindustri, granting the latter rights to Spyglass' films across nearly all media in Denmark, Sweden, Norway, Finland, and Iceland.
- On February 22, 1999, Spyglass entered an agreement with the Groupe Canal+ for television rights to its films in France, Overseas France, Wallonia, Romandy, and French-speaking regions within Monaco, Andorra, Mauritius, Africa, and Luxembourg; the deal excluded free television in Romandy. On May 12 that year, the agreement was expanded to include television rights in Denmark, Sweden, Norway, Finland, and Iceland.
- As of February 2001, the structure also included Groupe Canal+ for pay television in Poland and the Benelux, Sogecable for pay television in Spanish-speaking territories, Toho-Towa (theatrical) and Pony Canyon (home video) in Japan, Forum Film in Israel, Odeon in Greece, Syrena in Poland, Intercom in Hungary, Ster-Kinekor in South Africa, and E-Source for international airlines.

M. Night Shyamalan's The Sixth Sense (released 1999), Spyglass's second film after Instinct, grossed $661 million at the global box office. By May 23, 2000, Disney took a 10% equity stake in Spyglass for $15 million, along with Svensk Filmindustri and Lusomundo, each of which held 2% for $3 million. On March 7, 2003, Spyglass Entertainment agreed to a four-year distribution output deal with Village Roadshow for Australia, New Zealand and Greece.

On August 6, 2002, Spyglass Entertainment launched a television division, and it was focused on small screen projects. One of its projects was the short-lived series Miracles. That same year, it attempted to merge with smaller independent distributor Intermedia, but it failed.

In December 2003, Spyglass' deal with Disney expired, and the former agreed to a four-year first-look non-exclusive co-financing and production deal with DreamWorks. This deal was never finalized and the relationship was not working well. Thus on September 23, 2003, Spyglass instead made a similar deal with Sony Pictures. Spyglass did not move to the Sony lot, but to Murdoch Plaza in Westwood, Los Angeles.

On March 25, 2010, Spyglass was acquired by Cerberus Capital Management.

On December 20, 2010, Gary Barber and Roger Birnbaum became co-chairmen and CEOs of the holding company of Metro-Goldwyn-Mayer (MGM), which had at that time recently emerged from bankruptcy. The original plan had the Spyglass library being added to MGM, but it was later removed from the plan.

=== Spyglass Media Group ===
On March 13, 2019, Barber and Lantern Entertainment revived the company as Spyglass Media Group with all of Lantern's assets being absorbed into the revived company, bringing in Eagle Pictures and Cineworld as investors. Lantern made a majority investment and also transferred its film library and the rights to Miramax film sequels to Spyglass. Barber owns the Spyglass trademark and the sequel and remake rights to the old Spyglass library, which he has contributed. The company plans to produce content for all platforms. Spyglass closed the former Lantern Entertainment/TWC office in New York City while laying off 15 staff members across divisions. Unlike Spyglass Entertainment, Birnbaum is not the co-founder of Spyglass Media Group, though Birnbaum served as the producer of Eli Roth's Thanksgiving (released 2023).

On April 1, 2019, Lauren Whitney, the president of television for Miramax, took on the same position for Spyglass. Damien Marin followed Barber from MGM to be appointed Spyglass president of worldwide distribution and acquisitions on September 3, 2019.

On April 16, 2019, Warner Bros. bought an equity stake in Spyglass, which signed a first-look deal with the studio. Spyglass was involved on August 1, 2019, in a potential purchase of part of Miramax but dropped out in two weeks. Following the acquisition of Warner Bros. Discovery by Paramount Skydance, Spyglass reunited with Miramax (which Harvey Weinstein no longer interested in combining TWC's film library with Miramax).

Spyglass's first greenlit film since its revival is a revival of the Hellraiser franchise, which is announced on May 6, 2019. With the company winning the rights to Stephen King's The Institute book in November 2019, Jack Bender and David E. Kelley were paired to development and produce the book as a mini-series. Also, Bender was signed by Spyglass to a television first-look deal.

MGM President of Physical Production Peter Oillataguerre was appointed President of Production for Spyglass Media Group reporting to Barber. He left in September 2023 for Amazon MGM Studios.

On October 28, 2020, Spyglass teamed up with Propagate Content, Artists First and Off-Road Productions to form a new comedy joint-venture named Artists Road, and it focuses on financing and producing mid-budgeted commercial comedy films.

On July 15, 2021, Lionsgate acquired 200 films from The Weinstein Company (TWC)'s film library for $191.4 million, which until then had been owned by Spyglass, with Lionsgate getting an 18.9% equity stake in Spyglass and Spyglass getting a first look television deal with Lionsgate Television.

In November 2023, Spyglass fired Melissa Barrera from Scream 7 for pro-Palestinian comments during the Gaza war, which Spyglass deemed antisemitic. In late 2023, Barrera shared a post accusing Israel of "genocide and ethnic cleansing" and a magazine article alleging the Israeli government was distorting "the Holocaust to boost the Israeli arms industry". In late 2023, a Spyglass spokesman told Variety "Spyglass' stance is unequivocally clear: we have zero tolerance for antisemitism or the incitement of hate in any form, including false references to genocide, ethnic cleansing, Holocaust distortion or anything that flagrantly crosses the line into hate speech." Her co-star Jenna Ortega departed the film shortly after due to what was claimed at the time to be scheduling conflicts with Wednesday. Ortega refuted that in an April 2025 interview with The Cut, stating the departure of Barrera, along with directors Matt Bettinelli-Olpin and Tyler Gillett, then new director Christopher Landon due to conflicts with Spyglass's retooling of Scream 7, made her return untenable. The film was then completely overhauled and recast with Neve Campbell returning as the film's lead.

== Filmography ==
=== As Spyglass Entertainment ===
==== 1990s ====
Title	Release date	Distributor	Notes	Budget	Gross
Instinct	June 4, 1999	Buena Vista Pictures	Released through Disney's Touchstone Pictures label; co-production with Barbara Boyle/Michael Taylor Productions; first film	$80 million	$34.1 million
The Sixth Sense	August 6, 1999	Buena Vista Pictures	Released through Disney's Hollywood Pictures label; co-production with The Kennedy/Marshall Company and Barry Mendel Productions	$40 million	$672.8 million
The Insider	November 5, 1999	Buena Vista Pictures	Released through Disney's Touchstone Pictures label; co-production with Forward Pass and Eric Roth Productions	$68 million	$60.2 million

==== 2000s ====
Title	Release date	Distributor	Notes	Budget	Gross
Mission to Mars	March 10, 2000	Buena Vista Pictures	Released through Disney's Touchstone Pictures label; co-production with Jacobson Company	$100 million	$111 million
Keeping the Faith	April 14, 2000	Buena Vista Pictures	Released through Disney's Touchstone Pictures label; co-production with Birnbaum/Barber Productions, Koch Co., Blumberg/Norton Productions and Triple Threat Talent	$29 million	$59.9 million
Shanghai Noon	May 26, 2000	Buena Vista Pictures	Released through Disney's Touchstone Pictures label; co-production with Birnbaum/Barber Productions and Jackie Chan Films Ltd.	$55 million	$100.5 million
Out Cold	November 21, 2001	Buena Vista Pictures	Released through Disney's Touchstone Pictures label; co-production with Birnbaum/Barber Productions and The Donners' Company	$24 million	$14.8 million
The Count of Monte Cristo	January 25, 2002	Buena Vista Pictures	Released through Disney's Touchstone Pictures label; co-production with Birnbaum/Barber Productions	$35 million	$75.4 million
Dragonfly	February 22, 2002	Universal Pictures	co-production with Gran Via Productions and Shady Acres Entertainment; international distribution through Buena Vista International	$60 million	$52.3 million
Reign of Fire	July 12, 2002	Buena Vista Pictures	Released through Disney's Touchstone Pictures label; co-production with Birnbaum/Barber Productions and The Zanuck Company	$60 million	$82.2 million
Abandon	October 18, 2002	Paramount Pictures	co-production with Lynda Obst Productions; international distribution through Buena Vista International	$25 million	$12.3 million
The Recruit	January 31, 2003	Buena Vista Pictures	Released through Disney's Touchstone Pictures label; co-production with Birnbaum/Barber Productions and Epsilon Motion Pictures	$46 million	$101.2 million
Shanghai Knights	February 7, 2003	Buena Vista Pictures	Released through Disney's Touchstone Pictures label; co-production with Birnbaum/Barber Productions and Jackie Chan Films Ltd.	$50 million	$88.3 million
Bruce Almighty	May 23, 2003	Universal Pictures	co-production with Shady Acres Entertainment and Pit Bull Productions; international distribution through Buena Vista International	$81 million	$484.6 million
Seabiscuit	July 25, 2003	Universal Pictures	co-production with DreamWorks Pictures, The Kennedy/Marshall Company and Larger Than Life Productions; international distribution through Buena Vista International	$87 million	$148.3 million
The Perfect Score	January 30, 2004	Paramount Pictures	uncredited; co-production with MTV Films and Tollin/Robbins Productions	N/A	$10.5 million
Connie and Carla	April 16, 2004	Universal Pictures	co-production with Birnbaum/Barber Productions	$27 million	$11.3 million
Mr. 3000	September 17, 2004	Buena Vista Pictures	Released through Disney's Touchstone Pictures label; co-production with Dimension Films, Birnbaum/Barber Productions and The Kennedy/Marshall Company	$30 million	$21.8 million
The Pacifier	March 4, 2005	Buena Vista Pictures	Released through Disney's Walt Disney Pictures label; co-production with Birnbaum/Barber Productions	$56 million	$198.6 million
The Hitchhiker's Guide to the Galaxy	April 29, 2005	Buena Vista Pictures	Released through Disney's Touchstone Pictures label; co-production with Birnbaum/Barber Productions, Hammer & Tongs and Everyman Pictures	$45–50 million	$104.5 million
The Legend of Zorro	October 28, 2005	Sony Pictures Releasing	Released through Sony's Columbia Pictures label; co-production with Amblin Entertainment and Parkes/MacDonald Productions	$65 million	$142.4 million
Memoirs of a Geisha	December 9, 2005	Sony Pictures Releasing	Released through Sony's Columbia Pictures label; co-production with DreamWorks Pictures, Amblin Entertainment and Red Wagon Entertainment	$85 million	$162.2 million
Eight Below	February 17, 2006	Buena Vista Pictures	Released through Disney's Walt Disney Pictures label; co-production with Mandeville Films and The Kennedy/Marshall Company	$40 million	$120.5 million
Stay Alive	March 24, 2006	Buena Vista Pictures	Released through Disney's Hollywood Pictures label; co-production with Endgame Entertainment, Wonderland Sound and Vision and Birnbaum/Barber Productions; international distribution through Universal Pictures	$20 million	$27.1 million
Stick It	April 28, 2006	Buena Vista Pictures	Released through Disney's Touchstone Pictures label; co-production with Birnbaum/Barber Productions, Gail Lyon Productions and Jessica Bendinger Productions	$20 million	$31.9 million
The Lookout	March 30, 2007	Buena Vista Pictures	Released through Disney's Miramax Films label; co-production with Laurence Mark Productions, Parkes-MacDonald Productions and Birnbaum/Barber Productions	$16 million	$5.4 million
The Invisible	April 27, 2007	Buena Vista Pictures	Released through Disney's Hollywood Pictures label, co-production with Birnbaum/Barber Productions and MacariEdelstein Productions	N/A	$26.8 million
Evan Almighty	June 22, 2007	Universal Pictures	co-production with Relativity Media, Original Film, Shady Acres Entertainment and Birnbaum/Barber Productions	$175 million	$173.4 million
Underdog	August 3, 2007	Buena Vista Pictures	Released through Disney's Walt Disney Pictures label; co-production with Birnbaum/Barber Productions, Jay Polstein Productions and Classic Media	$25 million	$65.3 million
Balls of Fury	August 29, 2007	Focus Features	co-production with Rogue Pictures, Intrepid Pictures and Birnbaum/Barber Productions	N/A	$41.1 million
27 Dresses	January 18, 2008	20th Century Fox	Released through Fox's Fox 2000 Pictures label; co-production with Birnbaum/Barber Productions and Dune Entertainment III, LLC	$30 million	$160.3 million
Welcome Home Roscoe Jenkins	February 8, 2008	Universal Pictures	co-production with Stuber-Parent Productions	$35 million	$43.6 million
The Ruins	April 4, 2008	Paramount Pictures	Released through Paramount's DreamWorks Pictures label; co-production with Red Hour Films	$25 million	$22.3 million
The Happening	June 13, 2008	20th Century Fox	co-production with Dune Entertainment, UTV Motion Pictures and Blinding Edge Pictures	$48 million	$163.4 million
The Love Guru	June 20, 2008	Paramount Pictures	co-production with Nomoneyfun Films and Michael de Luca Productions	$62 million	$40.9 million
Wanted	June 27, 2008	Universal Pictures	co-production with Relativity Media, Marc Platt Productions, Kickstart Productions and Top Cow Productions	$75 million	$341.4 million
Ghost Town	September 19, 2008	Paramount Pictures	Released through Paramount's DreamWorks Pictures label; co-production with Pariah	$20 million	$27.1 million
Flash of Genius	October 3, 2008	Universal Pictures	co-production with Strike Entertainment	$20 million	$4.8 million
Four Christmases	November 26, 2008	Warner Bros. Pictures	Released through Warner Bros.' New Line Cinema label; co-production with Wild West Picture Show Productions and Type A Films	$80 million	$163.7 million
Star Trek	May 8, 2009	Paramount Pictures	co-production with Bad Robot	$150 million	$385.7 million
G.I. Joe: The Rise of Cobra	August 7, 2009	Paramount Pictures	co-production with Hasbro and di Bonaventura Pictures	$175 million	$302.5 million
Invictus	December 11, 2009	Warner Bros. Pictures	co-production with Revelations Entertainment, Mace Neufeld Productions and Malpaso Productions	$50–60 million	$122.2 million

==== 2010s ====
Title	Release date	Distributor	Notes	Budget	Gross
Leap Year	January 8, 2010	Universal Pictures	co-production with BenderSpink and Birnbaum/Barber Productions	$19 million	$32.6 million
Get Him to the Greek	June 4, 2010	Universal Pictures	co-production with Relativity Media and Apatow Productions	$40 million	$91.3 million
Dinner for Schmucks	July 30, 2010	Paramount Pictures	co-production with DreamWorks Pictures, Parkes/MacDonald Productions, Reliance Big Pictures and Everyman Pictures	$69 million	$86.9 million
The Tourist	December 10, 2010	Sony Pictures Releasing	Released through Sony's Columbia Pictures label; co-production with GK Films and StudioCanal	$100 million	$278.3 million
The Dilemma	January 14, 2011	Universal Pictures	co-production with Imagine Entertainment and Wild West Picture Show Productions	$70 million	$69.7 million
No Strings Attached	January 21, 2011	Paramount Pictures	Released through Paramount's DW Studios label, co-production with Cold Spring Pictures and The Montecito Picture Company	$25 million	$149.2 million
Footloose	October 14, 2011	Paramount Pictures	co-production with MTV Films, Dylan Sellers Productions, Zadan/Meron Productions and Weston Pictures	$24 million	$63.5 million
The Vow	February 10, 2012	Sony Pictures Releasing	Released through Sony's Screen Gems label; co-production with Birnbaum/Barber Productions; final film	$30 million	$196.1 million

=== As Spyglass Media Group ===
==== 2020s ====
Title	Release date	Distributor	Notes	Budget	Gross
Scream	January 14, 2022	Paramount Pictures	co-production with Project X Entertainment and Radio Silence Productions	$24 million	$138.9 million
Hellraiser	October 7, 2022	Hulu (United States); Paramount Pictures (International)	co-production with Phantom Four Films and 247Hub	$14 million	$12,640
Scream VI	March 10, 2023	Paramount Pictures	co-production with Project X Entertainment and Radio Silence Productions	$33–35 million	$169.1 million
Spy Kids: Armageddon	September 22, 2023	Netflix	co-production with Skydance Media and Troublemaker Studios	N/A	N/A
Thanksgiving	November 17, 2023	Sony Pictures Releasing	co-production with TriStar Pictures, Dragonfly Entertainment and Electromagnetic Productions	$15 million	$46.5 million
The Boys in the Boat	December 25, 2023	Amazon MGM Studios	co-production with Metro-Goldwyn-Mayer, Smokehouse Pictures, Tempesta Films and Anonymous Content	$40 million	$55.5 million
Reunion	June 28, 2024	Republic Pictures	co-production with Lionsgate Films, Artists Road and Unique Features	N/A	N/A
Incoming	August 23, 2024	Netflix	co-production with Artists Road and Stoller Global Solutions	N/A	N/A
Heart Eyes	February 7, 2025	Screen Gems (through Sony Pictures Releasing; North America); Republic Pictures (through Paramount Pictures; International)	co-production with Divide/Conquer	$18 million	$32.9 million
Scream 7	February 27, 2026	Paramount Pictures	co-production with Radio Silence Productions, Project X Entertainment and Outerbanks Entertainment	$45 million	$214 million
Klara and the Sun	October 23, 2026	Sony Pictures Releasing	co-production with Columbia Pictures, 3000 Pictures, Heyday Films and Defender Films	$20–44.3 million	$3 million

==== Upcoming ====
Title	Release date	Distributor	Notes	Production status
The Rescue	January 29, 2027	Paramount Pictures	co-production with Hideout Productions	Post-production
Heart Eyes 2	February 11, 2028	Paramount Pictures	co-production with Divide/Conquer	Pre-production
Thanksgiving 2	TBA	Sony Pictures Releasing	co-production with TriStar Pictures, Dragonfly Entertainment and Electromagnetic Productions	Pre-production

==== In development ====
Title	Distributor	Notes
Deadpoint	TBA	co-production with Good Fear Content
Knight Rider	Universal Pictures	co-production with 87North Productions
Perfect Strangers	TBA	co-production with Eagle Pictures, 3 Marys Entertainment and Hoorae
Pulse	Screen Gems	co-production with Bad Feeling
Scream 8	Paramount Pictures	co-production with Project X Entertainment and Radio Silence Productions
Short Circuit	TBA	co-production with Project X Entertainment and Rehab Entertainment
Untitled 1408 sequel	TBA	co-production with Di Bonaventura Pictures, Bluestone Entertainment and FilmNation Entertainment
