= He Named Me Malala =

2015 documentary film by Davis Guggenheim

- Theatrical release poster
- Directed by: Davis Guggenheim
- Produced by: Walter Parkes; Laurie MacDonald; Davis Guggenheim
- Cinematography: Erich Roland
- Edited by: Greg Finton, ACE; Brian Johnson; Brad Fuller
- Music by: Thomas Newman
- Production companies: Imagenation Abu Dhabi; Participant Media
- Distributed by: Fox Searchlight Pictures; National Geographic Channel
- Release dates: September 4, 2015 (Telluride); October 2, 2015 (United States)
- Running time: 88 minutes
- Countries: United States; United Arab Emirates
- Language: English
- Box office: $2.7 million

He Named Me Malala is a 2015 American documentary film directed by Davis Guggenheim. The film presents the young Pakistani female activist and Nobel Peace Prize laureate Malala Yousafzai, who has spoken out for the rights of girls, especially the right to education, since her early childhood. The film also recounts how she survived and has become even more eloquent in her quest after being hunted down and shot by a Taliban gunman as part of the organization's violent opposition to girls' education in the Swat Valley in Pakistan. The title refers to the Afghan folk hero Malalai of Maiwand, after whom her father named her.

On December 1, 2015, He Named Me Malala was shortlisted with fourteen other documentaries submitted to the 88th Academy Awards in the Best Documentary Feature category, but failed to gain the nomination. It was nominated at the 43rd Annie Awards in Best Animated Special Production category.

== Production ==
Walter F. Parkes and Laurie MacDonald produced the film through Imagination Abu Dhabi FZ along with Participant Media.

== Release ==
In March 2015, Fox Searchlight Pictures acquired distribution rights to the film worldwide excluding French-speaking territories, where StudioCanal would release the film.

The film premiered at the Telluride Film Festival on September 4, 2015, and received a theatrical release in the United States on October 2. On June 18, 2015, National Geographic announced they had acquired broadcasting rights to the film and will air the film in 171 countries in 45 languages. In Pakistan, Geo News broadcast the film, which was dubbed in Urdu language by family of Yousafzai.

He Named Me Malala was released on DVD on December 15, 2015.

== Reception ==
=== Box office ===
He Named Me Malala opened theatrically in the United States on October 2, 2015, and earned $60,884 in its opening weekend, ranking number 43 in the United States box office. The following week the film expanded from 4 to 446 screens, earning an estimated $685,000. As of October 25, 2015, the film's domestic total stands at $1,978,146. The film began its international rollout on October 22 in Germany where it grossed $29,880 from 71 screens for a 25th place spot. It opened Austria a day later, where it debuted with $4,765 from 11 screens. As of October 25, 2015, the film's domestic total stands at $1,978,146 and the international total is $34,644, giving the film a worldwide gross of $2,012,790.

=== Critical reception ===
On Rotten Tomatoes, the film has a rating of 71% based on 110 reviews, with an average rating of 6.6/10. The site's consensus reads, "He Named Me Malala spotlights a worthy subject, but without the focus her story deserves." On Metacritic, the film has a score of 61 out of 100, based on 25 critics, indicating "generally favorable" reviews. Audiences surveyed by CinemaScore gave the film an average grade of "A" on an A+ to F scale.

=== Accolades ===
The film received two Women's Image Network Awards nominations, including Best Documentary and Best Producer. It was nominated at the 69th British Academy Film Awards for Best Documentary. It lost to Amy.

Awards
| Award | Category | Recipient(s) | Result | Ref. |
|---|---|---|---|---|
| Annie Awards | Best Animated Special Production | Parkes-MacDonald / Little Door | Won | |
| Annie Awards | Outstanding Achievement, Production Design in an Animated Feature Production | Jason Carpenter | Nominated | |
| British Academy Film Awards | Best Documentary | Davis Guggenheim, Laurie MacDonald and Walter Parkes | Nominated | |
| Critics' Choice Awards | Best Documentary - Feature | Davis Guggenheim | Nominated | |
| Golden Trailer Awards | Best Documentary | "Trailer 1" | Won | |
| Primetime Creative Arts Emmy Awards | Outstanding Directing for Nonfiction Programming | Davis Guggenheim | Nominated | |
| Primetime Creative Arts Emmy Awards | Outstanding Cinematography for Nonfiction Programming | Sam Painter | Nominated | |
| Primetime Creative Arts Emmy Awards | Outstanding Picture Editing for Nonfiction Programming | Greg Finton, Brian Johnson and Brad Fuller | Nominated | |
| Primetime Creative Arts Emmy Awards | Outstanding Production Design for a Variety, Nonfiction, Event, or Award Special | He Named Me Malala | Nominated | |
| Primetime Creative Arts Emmy Awards | Outstanding Sound Editing for Nonfiction Programming (Single or Multi-Camera) | He Named Me Malala | Nominated | |
| Primetime Creative Arts Emmy Awards | Outstanding Individual Achievement in Animation (Juried) | Jason Carpenter | Won | |
| San Diego Film Festival | Audience Choice Award for Best Gala | Davis Guggenheim | Won | |
| Satellite Awards | Best Documentary Film | Davis Guggenheim | Nominated | |

== Soundtrack ==
The official soundtrack to the film, featuring original score composed by Thomas Newman, was released digitally on October 2, 2015, and physically on October 30, 2015, by Sony Classical. Additional tracks, that were not included on the official soundtrack, includes: "Happiness" (traditional) - performed by Form IV Class of Kisaruni Secondary School 2014, "I Am Many" - written by Alicia Keys and Thomas Newman and "Story to Tell" by Alicia Keys.

== See also ==
- I Am Malala book
