= The Island (2005 film) =

2005 film by Michael Bay

- Theatrical release poster
- Directed by: Michael Bay
- Screenplay by: Caspian Tredwell-Owen; Alex Kurtzman; Roberto Orci
- Story by: Caspian Tredwell-Owen
- Produced by: Walter F. Parkes; Michael Bay; Ian Bryce
- Starring: Ewan McGregor; Scarlett Johansson; Djimon Hounsou; Sean Bean; Michael Clarke Duncan; Steve Buscemi
- Cinematography: Mauro Fiore
- Edited by: Paul Rubell; Christian Wagner; Roger Barton; John Murray; Tom Muldoon; Nina Lucia; Todd Douglas Miller
- Music by: Steve Jablonsky
- Production companies: DreamWorks Pictures; Parkes/MacDonald Productions
- Distributed by: DreamWorks Distribution LLC (North America); Warner Bros. Pictures (International)
- Release date: July 22, 2005; (United States)
- Running time: 136 minutes
- Country: United States
- Language: English
- Budget: $126 million
- Box office: $162.9 million

The Island is a 2005 American science fiction action film directed and co-produced by Michael Bay and written by Caspian Tredwell-Owen, Alex Kurtzman and Roberto Orci, from a story by Tredwell-Owen. It stars Ewan McGregor, Scarlett Johansson, Djimon Hounsou, Sean Bean, Michael Clarke Duncan, and Steve Buscemi. The film is about two human clones, Lincoln Six Echo (McGregor) and Jordan Two Delta (Johansson), who live in a dystopian compound isolated from the outside world. After Lincoln learns that the compound inhabitants are clones used for organ harvesting as well as surrogacy for wealthy people, the two escape with the goal of exposing the illegal cloning movement.

The Island has been described as a pastiche of "escape-from-dystopia" science fiction films of the 1960s and 1970s, such as Fahrenheit 451, THX 1138, Parts: The Clonus Horror, and Logan's Run. The Island cost $126 million to produce. It opened on July 22, 2005, by DreamWorks Pictures in North America and internationally by Warner Bros. Pictures, to mixed reviews, earning $36 million at the United States box office and $127 million overseas for a $162 million worldwide total.

== Plot ==
In 2019, Lincoln Six Echo and Jordan Two Delta live with others in an isolated compound. This dystopian community is governed by a strict set of rules. The residents are told that the outside world has become too contaminated to support life with the exception of a pathogen-free island. Each week, one resident gets to leave the compound and live on the island by way of a lottery.

Lincoln begins having dreams that he knows are not from his own experiences. Dr. Merrick, a scientist who runs the compound, is concerned so he places probes in Lincoln's body to monitor his cerebral activity. While secretly visiting the off-limits power facility in the basement where technician James McCord works, Lincoln discovers a live moth in a ventilation shaft, leading him to deduce the outside world is not really contaminated.

Lincoln follows the moth to another section, where he discovers the "lottery" is actually a system to selectively remove inhabitants from the compound, where the "winner" is then used for organ harvesting, surrogate pregnancies, and other important purposes for each one's wealthy sponsor, of whom they are clones.

Merrick learns Lincoln has discovered the truth about his existence, which compels Lincoln to escape. Meanwhile, Jordan has been selected for the island. She and Lincoln escape the facility and emerge in the desert. He explains the truth to Jordan, and they set out to discover the real world. Merrick hires Burkinabé mercenary and former GIGN operative Albert Laurent to find and return them to the compound.

Lincoln and Jordan find McCord in a bar, who explains that all the facility residents are clones of wealthy sponsors kept ignorant about the real world and conditioned to never question their environment or history. Merrick explains to Laurent that while the public is told that the clones are kept in a persistent vegetative state, trials had shown that the organs could only survive if the clones had consciousness.

McCord provides the name of Lincoln's sponsor, yacht designer Tom Lincoln, in Los Angeles and helps them to the Yucca maglev station, where they board an Amtrak train to Los Angeles before mercenaries kill him. In New York City, Jordan's sponsor, supermodel Sarah Jordan, is comatose following a car crash and requires transplants from Jordan to survive. Lincoln and Jordan evade both the Los Angeles Police Department and the mercenaries and arrive at Tom's house.

Lincoln meets Tom, who gives him some explanation about the cloning institute, causing Lincoln to realize that he has gained Tom's memories. Tom seemingly agrees to help Lincoln and Jordan reveal Merrick's crimes to the public, but secretly betrays them to Merrick and Laurent, as he desperately needs Lincoln's liver to survive his cirrhosis.

Tricking Lincoln into leaving with him, although Jordan had warned him she believed he was lying, Tom brings him to an ambush that results in a car chase through suburban Los Angeles. It ends with Lincoln tricking Laurent into believing Tom is the clone and killing him, allowing him to assume Tom's identity. Returning to Tom's home, Lincoln and Jordan give in to their romantic urges and have sex.

Merrick surmises that a cloning defect was responsible for Lincoln's memories and behavior, resulting in him and every future clone generation to question their environment and even tap into their sponsor's memories. To prevent this, he decides to eliminate the four latest generations of clones. Lincoln and Jordan, however, plan to liberate the other clones. Posing as Tom, Lincoln returns to the compound to destroy the holographic projectors that conceal the outside world. Jordan allows herself to be caught to assist Lincoln's plan.

Laurent, who has moral qualms about the clones' treatment after witnessing their fight for survival and learning that Sarah may not survive even with the organ transplants, helps Jordan. Lincoln kills Merrick with a harpoon gun, and the clones are freed, seeing the outside world for the first time. As Laurent seemingly gives up his mercenary life, Lincoln and Jordan sail away in one of Tom's boats together toward an island, fulfilling their dream of one day going to such a place.

== Cast ==
- Ewan McGregor as Tom Lincoln / Lincoln Six Echo
- Scarlett Johansson as Sarah Jordan / Jordan Two Delta
- Djimon Hounsou as Albert Laurent
- Sean Bean as Dr. Merrick
- Michael Clarke Duncan as Jamal Starkweather / Starkweather Two Delta
- Steve Buscemi as James "Mac" McCord
- Ethan Phillips as Jones Three Echo
- Glenn Morshower as Medical Courier
- Chris Ellis as Aces & Spades Bartender
- Tom Everett as The President
- Shawnee Smith as Suzie
- Kim Coates (uncredited) as Charles Whitman

== Production ==
=== Pre-production ===
In the original script written by Caspian Tredwell-Owen, at the time known for his work on the 2003 film Beyond Borders, the story was set one hundred years in the future and Scarlett Johansson's character Jordan Two Delta was originally named Ester and was meant to be pregnant. After DreamWorks Pictures acquired the rights to the script, it was then re-written by writing duo Alex Kurtzman and Roberto Orci, at the time mostly known for their work on the television shows Hercules: The Legendary Journeys, Xena: Warrior Princess and Alias, mostly to decrease the budget. Kurtzman and Orci also heavily re-wrote the second and third acts of the film and included the scene of Ewan McGregor's character Lincoln Six Echo finding a butterfly.

DreamWorks executives Steven Spielberg, Walter F. Parkes and Laurie MacDonald chose Michael Bay to direct the film, having been impressed with his work.

The Island was the first of many collaborations between Spielberg, Bay, Kurtzman and Orci. Bay later directed the first five films of the live-action Transformers film series, which Spielberg executive produced, as well as producing Bumblebee, Transformers: Rise of the Beasts and Transformers One; Kurtzman and Orci later wrote The Legend of Zorro, the first two live-action Transformers films and Cowboys & Aliens. All of these projects would have Spielberg attached as executive producer, as with the 2008 film Eagle Eye, which the duo produced.

=== Filming ===
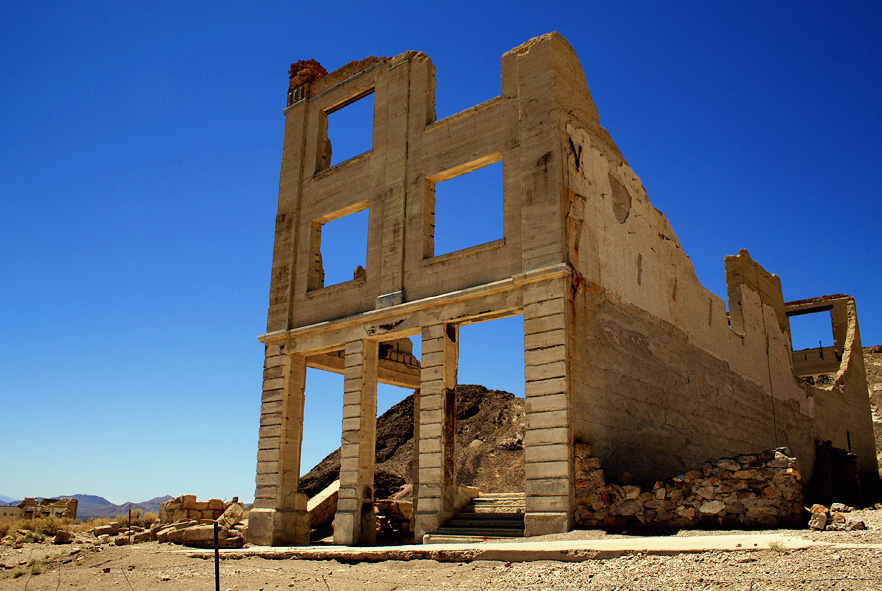
Ruins in Rhyolite, Nevada

Principal photography for The Island began on October 24, 2004. The ruined buildings where Jordan and Lincoln sleep after leaving the subterranean compound are in Rhyolite, Nevada. The city parts were shot in Detroit, Michigan, with Michigan Central Station one of the notable locations. Other portions of the film were shot in the Coachella Valley, California.

=== Soundtrack ===
The original score was composed by Steve Jablonsky, who went on to score Bay's further works. The initial soundtrack was released on July 26, 2005, containing 15 tracks. A 20th-anniversary remastered and expanded 2-CD version containing 58 tracks was released on Oct 1, 2025.

== Reception ==
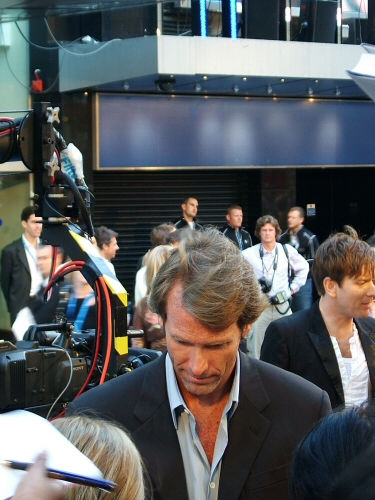
Director Michael Bay at the premiere of The Island on August 7, 2005

=== Box office ===
The Island grossed $12,409,070 in over 3,100 theaters its opening weekend in fourth place behind Charlie and the Chocolate Factory, Wedding Crashers and Fantastic Four. The film went on to gross $35,818,913 domestically and $127,130,251 in other markets, for a worldwide total of $162,949,164.

Ultimately, it was considered a box office bomb, which Edward Jay Epstein of Slate blamed on poor publicity. Epstein notes that research polls showed little awareness of The Island's impending release amongst its target audience and that trailers bore little relation to the film's plot. He writes, "What really failed here was not the directing, acting, or story (which were all acceptable for a summer movie) but the marketing campaign."

About the reception, director Michael Bay said, "I liked The Island and the thing is the reaction to The Island, it worked really well overseas. I knew it would never be a smash, because it's not that type of movie, and I continually have so many people that come up to me and say, 'God, that movie is so good.' But no one knew about it in America. I mean, I asked 500 people before it came out, they didn't even know when it was coming out. You saw our poster campaign, we had a muddled campaign, I knew we were in trouble with that movie domestically like four months out, and I kept saying, 'You should go with the Warner's campaign,' which did foreign, so it was a whole kind of microcosm study of studio marketing."

=== Critical reception ===
The Island drew mixed reviews from critics. On Rotten Tomatoes, the film has an approval rating of 39% based on reviews from 201 critics, with an average rating of 5.40/10. The website's consensus reads, "A clone of THX 1138, Coma, and Logan's Run, The Island is another loud and bombastic Michael Bay movie where explosions and chases matter more than characters, dialogue, or plot." On Metacritic, the film received "mixed or average reviews," with a weighted average of 50 out of 100 based on 38 critics. Audiences polled by CinemaScore gave the film an average grade of "B" on an A+ to F scale.

Roger Ebert of the Chicago Sun-Times said, "[the first half] is a spare, creepy science fiction parable, and then it shifts into a high-tech action picture. Both halves work. Whether they work together is a good question." Ebert gave the film three out of four stars and praised the performances of the actors, in particular Michael Clarke Duncan: "[He] has only three or four scenes, but they're of central importance, and he brings true horror to them." On the critical side, he said the film "never satisfactorily comes full circle" and missed the opportunity "to do what the best science fiction does, and use the future as a way to critique the present."

Variety's Justin Chang called the film an "exercise in sensory overkill" and said that Bay took on "the weighty moral conundrums of human cloning, resolving them in a storm of bullets, car chases and more explosions than you can shake a syringe at." He noted McGregor and Buscemi as highlights of the film, along with Nigel Phelps's production design. Chang felt the story lacked in surprises and blamed "attention-deficit editing by Paul Rubell and Christian Wagner" for action sequences that he thought lacked tension and were "joltingly repetitive".

Salon's Stephanie Zacharek also praised the actors but felt that when the film "[gets] really interesting, Bay thinks he needs to throw in a car crash or a round of gunfire to keep our attention". She felt the film had enough surprises "to make you wish it were better". A.O. Scott of The New York Times said "[the] film is smarter than you might expect, and at the same time dumber than it could be."

Reviewers were critical of the excessive product placement in the film.

=== Copyright infringement lawsuit ===
The creators of the 1979 film Parts: The Clonus Horror, which is also about a colony that breeds clones to harvest organs for the elite, filed a copyright infringement suit in 2005. DreamWorks attempted to have the suit dismissed but a federal judge determined that there was indeed a copyright infringement case to be heard and scheduled the case to go to trial in February 2007. However, DreamWorks then settled the case out of court in late 2006 for an undisclosed seven-figure sum.

Michael Marshall Smith's 1996 novel Spares, in which the hero liberates intelligent clones from a "spare farm", was optioned by DreamWorks in the late 1990s, but was never made. It remains unclear if the story inspired The Island, so Marshall Smith did not consider it worthwhile to pursue legal action over the similarities.
