= Burning Plain =

Burning Plain may refer to:

- The Burning Plain, a 2008 drama film
- Burning Plains, a fictional place in The Inheritance Cycle
