= The Dead Don't Die =

The Dead Don't Die may refer to:

- The Dead Don't Die (1975 film), a neo-noir horror thriller
- The Dead Don't Die (2019 film), a zombie horror-comedy

== See also ==
- Dead Men Don't Die, a 1991 horror comedy
