= Malcolm Marmorstein =

American screenwriter (1928–2020)

Malcolm Marmorstein (August 9, 1928 – November 21, 2020) was an American screenwriter and director.

== Filmography ==
=== Screenwriter ===
- The Doctors (1963 – head writer)
- Dark Shadows (1966–67 – 82 episodes)
- Peyton Place (1968 – 15 episodes)
- Night Gallery (1971 – 1 episode)
- S*P*Y*S (1974 – screenplay)
- Mary, Mary, Bloody Mary (1975 – screenplay)
- Whiffs (1975 – screenplay)
- Pete's Dragon (1977 – screenplay)
- Return from Witch Mountain (1978 – screenplay)
- Poochie (TV film) (1984 – teleplay)
- Rose Petal Place (TV special) (1984 – teleplay)
- Rose Petal Place: Real Friends (TV film) (1985 – teleplay)
- Konrad (TV film) (1985 – teleplay)
- CBS Storybreak (1985–88 – 3 episodes)
- ABC Weekend Special (1984–88 – 9 episodes)
- The Witching of Ben Wagner (TV film) (1990 – teleplay)
- Dead Men Don't Die (1991 – screenplay and director)
- Love Bites (1993 – screenplay and director)

== Death ==
Marmorstein died on November 21, 2020, at the age of 92 from cancer.
