= The California Reich =

1975 film

- Theatrical release poster
- Directed by: Keith F. Critchlow; Walter F. Parkes
- Produced by: Keith Critchlow; Walter F. Parkes
- Edited by: Keith Critchlow; Walter F. Parkes
- Music by: Craig Safan
- Distributed by: City Life Films
- Release date: 1975
- Running time: 55 minutes
- Country: United States
- Language: English

The California Reich is a 1975 documentary film on a group of neo-Nazis in Los Angeles, San Francisco and Tracy, California. They were members of the neo-Nazi National Socialist White People's Party. It was nominated for the Academy Award for Best Documentary Feature.

== Production ==
According to a report in The New York Times the journalist, John J. O'Connor, the two filmmakers "Spent more than a year with the neo-Nazis before cameras were allowed to record families and rituals." The filmmakers were quoted in the same article that they "Wanted to show the Nazis as members of our society, not as human monsters, but the people next door."

The documentary borrows its style from the French film movement Cinema Vérité where narration was absent through the film and they let the subjects speak for themselves.

== Summary ==
The opening of this film shows National Socialist White People's Party member Arnie Anderson recording a racist outgoing message on the party's phone machine. Later, the film shows a gathering of Nazis giving a Pledge of Allegiance to Adolf Hitler.

The film featured scenes with Jewish Defense League (JDL) leader Irv Rubin confronting American neo-Nazis.

== Reception and legacy ==
It was screened at the 1976 Cannes Film Festival, but was not entered into the main competition. It was also nominated for the Academy Award for Best Documentary Feature.

In his 1978 report John J. O'Connor said the filmmakers "Succeed all too well as their working-class subjects become grotesque parodies of disturbing elements that can be detected in varying degrees at all levels of society." in response to their goal to not portray the communities as monsters. He also said that the "most poignant episodes involves a 10 year old boy who says he does not share his father's philosophy. He goes to youth meetings to please his dad." In Saturday Review, Judith Crist called the film "a cool, intense, unsensational, and ultimately terrifying study." Crist continues by saying "There is no voice-over. The American Nazis speak for themselves. They are not frightening or funny. They are utterly ordinary and thereby terrifying."

In Film Quarterly, Mitch Tuchman state that "the material is inherently interesting as a bit of American ethnography", but continued that Parkes and Crichlow have "a horrible ambivalence toward their subjects". He wrote that the documentary was "unofficially sanctioned by the Nazis and The Jewish Anti-Defamation League finds it too mild in its condemnation." Portions from the film were used in the 1980 film The Blues Brothers as the speech given by the leader of the "American Socialist White People's Party" during a rally in a Chicago park, as he taunts angry counter-protesters.
