= Dinner for Schmucks =

2010 film by Jay Roach

- Theatrical release poster
- Directed by: Jay Roach
- Screenplay by: David Guion; Michael Handelman
- Based on: Le Dîner de Cons by Francis Veber
- Produced by: Walter F. Parkes; Laurie MacDonald; Jay Roach
- Starring: Steve Carell; Paul Rudd; Zach Galifianakis; Jemaine Clement; Jeff Dunham; Bruce Greenwood; Ron Livingston
- Cinematography: Jim Denault
- Edited by: Alan Baumgarten; Jon Poll
- Music by: Theodore Shapiro
- Production companies: DreamWorks Pictures; Spyglass Entertainment; Parkes + MacDonald Productions; Everyman Pictures; Reliance Entertainment
- Distributed by: Paramount Pictures
- Release date: July 30, 2010
- Running time: 114 minutes
- Country: United States
- Language: English
- Budget: $62.7–69 million
- Box office: $86.9 million

Dinner for Schmucks is a 2010 American comedy film directed by Jay Roach and based on Francis Veber's 1998 French film Le Dîner de Cons.

Starring Steve Carell and Paul Rudd, with Jemaine Clement, Jeff Dunham, Bruce Greenwood, and Ron Livingston in supporting roles, the film tells the story of a rising executive who finds out that his work superiors host a dinner celebrating the idiocy of their guests. He questions it when he is invited, just as he befriends a man who would be the perfect guest.

Dinner for Schmucks was released in theaters on July 30, 2010, by Paramount Pictures and DreamWorks Pictures and grossed $86.9 million against a $69 million budget.

== Plot ==
Tim Conrad gets wealthy businessman Martin Mueller as a client. Impressed by his ingenuity, his boss, Lance Fender, says he is a candidate for a promotion but wants to get to know him better. He invites him to a dinner to which he must bring an eccentric person with a special talent to be mocked by the executives; the winner earns a trophy, and the executive who brought them gets glory.

Tim tells his long-time girlfriend, Julie, about the possible promotion and dinner, but she is offended by the idea of inviting strange people to a dinner just to mock them, telling him to refuse the invitation.

The next day, Tim accidentally hits Barry Speck with his car as Barry is trying to retrieve a dead mouse from the road. Witnessing Barry's bizarre behavior, including taxidermy and arranging mice into dioramas based on famous artwork ("Mousterpieces"), Tim realizes he is the perfect idiot. Julie finds out Tim is inviting Barry to the dinner and leaves their apartment.

Barry shows up at Tim's apartment thinking the dinner event is that very evening, accidentally inviting over Darla, a pro wrestler Tim slept with once who is obsessed with him. After scolding Barry for inviting Darla over and explaining who she is, Tim watches as Barry takes it upon himself to keep Darla away from Tim, only for Barry to confuse Julie for her. Their conversation leads Julie to believe Tim is cheating on her, and she leaves again. When Tim realizes what Barry has done, he believes Julie may be at Kieran Vollard's, an artist whose work she is selling at a gallery and who has expressed interest in her.

Tim and Barry sneak into Vollard's apartment but learn Julie is not there. They return to Tim's, and Barry lets Darla in. Julie calls and asks Tim if he is having an affair, but Darla steals the phone, stuffing it down her pants. The call ends abruptly, making Julie believe he is cheating. As Tim hides in his bedroom trying to reach Julie, Darla and Barry have a bar-style fight, scaring Darla away.

Barry takes Tim to his IRS office to find Vollard's ranch address, meeting Barry's boss and rival, Therman Murche. Therman claims to have the "talent" of mind control and has authored a book about it. He had also stolen Barry's ex-wife after Barry caught them cheating. Barry, Tim, and Therman have a strange encounter, which results in Tim getting audited. Tim leaves the next day for a brunch with Mueller and his wife, but Barry crashes it, bringing Darla along and pretending she is Julie. Tim is pushed into asking Darla to marry him, and Julie walks in during the proposal. Tim and Barry chase Julie down at Vollard's ranch, where Tim snaps at Barry about his actions.

At the dinner party, Tim is surprised to find Barry already there, having forgiven Tim for his outburst. Barry's antics, along with his "Mousterpieces," are a hit with the group, and he is seemingly a shoo-in for the trophy. Unexpectedly, Therman arrives as the "guest" of another executive, embarrassing Barry with his mind control. Tim then tells Barry the truth about the dinner party and gets him to defeat Therman by using his own powers of "brain control."

Lance congratulates Tim on bringing Barry to the dinner as his idiot. Offended, Tim insults Lance before defending Barry. The other guests then learn they were brought to the dinner only to be mocked, leading to a chaotic brawl between the guests and the executives. The brawl leads to Mueller losing his finger and prized family ring, and Lance's mansion burning down.

Tim is fired, so he and Barry go to his apartment to try to catch Julie before she leaves. They arrive and find Julie's note, and Tim breaks down to Barry about how much he loves and cares for Julie just as she walks in the door. Tim and Julie reconcile with Barry's help. Barry makes Vollard realize it would be a problem to have Julie continue working for him, so Vollard fires her. In an epilogue told through a series of Barry's "Mousterpieces," Tim and Julie marry, Barry gets to have sex with Darla, and Barry also does some artwork with Vollard, while Therman writes a book in a mental hospital. Tim is hired by Mueller for a project, and Barry helps create a statue for Mueller featuring the finger he lost with the words "My wife's favorite finger" engraved at the bottom.

In a post-credits scene, shown in the form of one of Barry's "Mousterpieces," Lance's company goes bankrupt and, as a result, is named "Wall Street's Biggest Loser" by Forbes Magazine.

== Cast ==
- Steve Carell as Barry Speck
- Paul Rudd as Tim Conrad
- Jemaine Clement as Kieran Vollard
- Jeff Dunham as Lewis / Diane
- Bruce Greenwood as Lance Fender
- Ron Livingston as Caldwell
- Chris O'Dowd as Marco
- Lucy Punch as Darla
- Stephanie Szostak as Julie
- David Walliams as Martin Mueller
- Kristen Schaal as Susana
- Andrea Savage as Robin
- Lucy Davenport as Birgit Mueller
- Larry Wilmore as Williams
- Nick Kroll as Josh
- Patrick Fischler as Vincenzo
- Octavia Spencer as Madame Nora
- P. J. Byrne as Davenport
- Zach Galifianakis as Therman Murch
- Randall Park as Henderson
- Blanca Soto as Catherine
- Alex Borstein as Martha Speck

== Production ==
The budget for the film was split between the distributor Paramount Pictures, as well as DreamWorks Pictures and Spyglass Entertainment. The production budget was $69 million, but with tax credits the cost came in at $62.7 million. Filming of the dinner scene took place at the same location that was used for Wayne Manor in the 1960s Batman television series.

Dinner for Schmucks is the American adaptation of the French film Le Dîner de Cons (literally, "The Dinner of Idiots"). The film retains many familiar elements of the original, with the basic plot, including the involvement of the taxation authorities and the love triangle around the main character Tim. In the remake, however, Tim is made much more sympathetic (this is the first dinner he has participated in, and he is not in fact having an affair or deliberately cheating on his taxes), and the actual dinner is shown. Director Roach describes the film as "inspired by" the original rather than a remake.

=== Title ===
Debate ensued about the title's usage of the Yiddish word schmucks which is a mild cultural insult, similar to "idiot", but its literal meaning is a vulgar term for a penis. Debbie Schlussel asked whether the title should have been Dinner for Schlemiels as it would better describe the clumsy character played by Steve Carell. Responding in The New York Times, critic Michael Cieply determined that the intent was to be ambiguous as to which of the two main characters, played by Steve Carell and Paul Rudd, was the intended idiot.

In The Forward, Laura Hodes suggested that 'schmucks' correctly referred instead to the behavior of the film's antagonists, the bosses of Rudd's character.

== Release ==
Dinner for Schmucks was pushed back a week to July 30, 2010, to avoid competition with Salt and Inception.

=== Marketing ===
As part of promoting the film, the website Funny or Die featured videos of Jemaine Clement in character as Kieran Vollard.

The film's first trailer debuted with Date Night, Death at a Funeral, and A Nightmare on Elm Street. The second trailer was shown before select screenings of The A-Team, Get Him to the Greek, Grown Ups, and Inception.

=== Box office ===
Dinner for Schmucks made $8.4 million on its first day, ranking number two at the box office, behind Inception. The film earned $23.5 million on its opening weekend, placing it second overall for the weekend of July 30 to August 1. It ultimately grossed $73 million in North America and $13.4 million internationally, for a total of $86.4 million worldwide. The film was released in the United Kingdom on September 3, 2010, and opened on #2, behind The Last Exorcism.

=== Home media ===
Dinner for Schmucks was released on DVD and Blu-ray Disc on January 4, 2011, by Paramount Home Entertainment.

== Reception ==
On Rotten Tomatoes, the film holds an approval rating of 42% based on 191 reviews, with an average rating of 5.40/10. The site's critical consensus reads: "It doesn't honor its source material—or its immensely likable leads—as well as it should, but Dinner for Schmucks offers fitfully nourishing comedy." On Metacritic, the film has a weighted average score of 56 out of 100, based on 37 critics, indicating "mixed or average" reviews. Audiences polled by CinemaScore gave the film an average grade of "B" on an A+ to F scale.

Roger Ebert of the Chicago Sun-Times gave the film 3 out of 4:

The genius of this version depends on the performance by Steve Carell, who plays Barry Speck as a man impervious to insult and utterly at peace with himself. He's truly a transcendent idiot.

== Accolades ==
In 2010, Steve Carell was nominated for the Satellite Award for Best Actor for his performance as Barry Speck.
