= Kimberly Foster (actress) =

American actress

- Born: 1961 or 1962 (age 63–64)
- Occupation: Actress
- Years active: 1983–1995

Kimberly Foster (born 1961 or 1962) is an American former actress, best known for her role as Michelle Stevens in the CBS prime time soap opera Dallas from 1989 to 1991.

== Life and career ==
Kimberly Foster was a cheerleader and played on a basketball team while she was raised in Booneville, Arkansas. She and her mother traveled to "Europe or California or something" each summer. She worked as a model before she became an actress, making commercials for Dentyne, Diet Coke, Oldsmobile, and Shick razors among other products. She made her screen debut appearing opposite Joan Collins in the 1983 television film Making of a Male Model and later guest starred in a number of shows include The Fall Guy, Paper Dolls, Knight Rider, The A-Team and Hotel.

In 1985, Foster was regular cast member in the short-lived NBC drama series The Best Times produced by Lorimar Television. The following year, she made her film debut in the romantic comedy One Crazy Summer with John Cusack. She later appeared in Dragnet (1987) with Tom Hanks and Dan Aykroyd, You Can't Hurry Love (1988) with Bridget Fonda, and It Takes Two (1988) with fellow Arkansan George Newbern. In 1989, Foster was cast in a series regular role as Michelle Stevens in the thirteenth and fourteenth seasons of the CBS prime-time soap opera Dallas which she played from 1989 to 1991. Her character was briefly a sister-in-law to Bobby Ewing and later briefly a daughter-in-law to J.R. Ewing.

After Dallas, Foster starred in the 1993 vampire comedy film Loves Bites and the following year joined the cast of the ABC daytime drama soap opera, All My Children playing Liz Sloan to 1995.

== Filmography ==
=== Film ===
Year	Title	Role	Notes
1983	Making of a Male Model	Susan	Television film
1986	One Crazy Summer	Cookie Cambell	
1987	Dragnet	Betsy Blees	
1988	You Can't Hurry Love	Girl Reading Book	
1988	Windmills of the Gods	Woman on Mike's arm	Television film
1988	It Takes Two	Jonni Tigersmith	
1993	Broken Trust	Erica Brogan	
1993	Love Bites	Kendall Gordon	

=== Television ===
Year	Title	Role	Notes
1983	The Yellow Rose	Bar Waitress	Episode: "Walls of Fear"
1984	The Fall Guy	Unknown	Episode: "The Huntress"
1984	Double Trouble	Lisa Fletcher	Episode: "Dueling Feet"
1984	Paper Dolls	Casey	2 episodes
1984	Knight Rider	Tonie Baxter	Episode: "The Chameleon"
1985	Cover Up	Angelica	3 episodes
1985	The A-Team	Tina	Episode: "Beverly Hills Assault"
1985	Hotel	Wendy	Episode: "Lost and Found"
1987	Thirtysomething	Fantasy Girl	Episode: "Thirtysomething"
1989	CBS Summer Playhouse	Tracy	Episode: "B Men"
1989-1991	Dallas	Michelle Stevens	Series regular, 51 episodes
1992	Quantum Leap	Wendy Cooper	Episode: "Ghost Ship - August 13, 1956"
1994-1995	All My Children	Liz Sloan	Series regular, 14 episodes
