= Phil Bruns =

American actor (1931–2012)

- Bruns as Morty Seinfeld in Seinfeld, before being replaced by Barney Martin
- Born: Philip Bruns; May 2, 1931; Pipestone, Minnesota, U.S.
- Died: February 8, 2012 (aged 80); Los Angeles, California, U.S.
- Education: Augustana College; Yale School of Drama; Bristol Old Vic Theatre School
- Occupations: Actor, writer
- Years active: 1959–2012
- Spouses: Jill Owens (m. 1969): Laurie Franks

Philip Bruns (May 2, 1931 – February 8, 2012) was an American television and movie actor and writer. He portrayed George Shumway, the father of Mary Hartman on the 1970s comedic series Mary Hartman, Mary Hartman, and Morty Seinfeld, the father of Jerry Seinfeld, in the 1990 second episode of Seinfeld.

== Early life ==
Bruns was born on May 2, 1931, at a farm near Pipestone, Minnesota, the youngest of three children of Margie Evelyn Solon (née Trigg) and Henry Phillip Bruns. His ancestry was German and Irish. He played high school football.

He graduated with a Bachelor's Degree from Augustana College in South Dakota. He earned his Master's Degree from the Yale School of Drama in New Haven, Connecticut. He also studied at the Bristol Old Vic Theatre School in London, England.

== Career ==
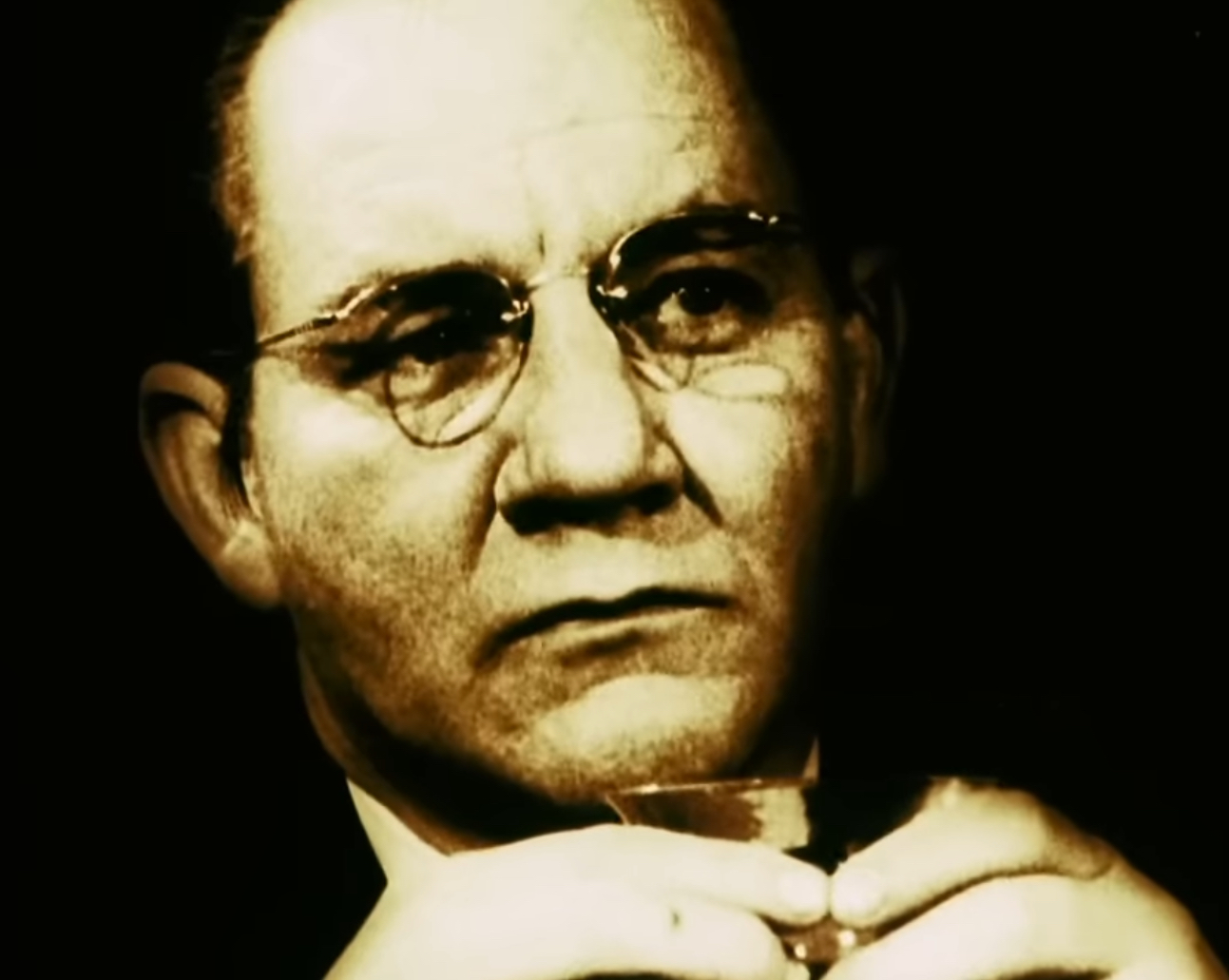
Bruns in Silent Night, Bloody Night (1972)

Bruns appeared in dozens of films, TV commercials, and on and Off-Broadway plays (winning an Obie Award for "Mr. Simian" in the 1963-64 season). He played the Warlock in Werner Liepolt's "The Young Master Dante" at The American Place Theater in 1968. He appeared for three seasons on The Jackie Gleason Show and played the father, George Shumway, on the 1970s comedic series Mary Hartman, Mary Hartman.

Bruns appeared as Morty Seinfeld in the sitcom Seinfeld, in a first-season episode entitled "The Stake Out", but was replaced in the role by Barney Martin after showrunners Larry David and Jerry Seinfeld decided they wanted the character of Morty Seinfeld to be "a harsher parent" or "an easy-to-anger curmudgeon".

Films in which Bruns appeared include A Thousand Clowns (1965), Jenny (1970), The Out-of-Towners (1970), The Gang That Couldn't Shoot Straight (1971), Silent Night, Bloody Night (1972), Harry and Tonto (1974), The Great Waldo Pepper (1975), Nickelodeon (1976), Corvette Summer (1978), The Stunt Man (1980), My Favorite Year (1982), Flashdance (1983), Amazon Women on the Moon (1987), Return of the Living Dead Part II (1988), Dead Men Don't Die (1991), The Opposite Sex and How to Live with Them (1993), Love Bites (1993), Pentathlon (1994), The Trigger Effect, and Ed (1996). He wrote The Character Actor's Do's, Don't and Anecdotes', which was published in early November 2008.

On television Bruns appeared in such dramas and comedies as Sanford and Son, The Wild Wild West, The Rat Patrol, Here's Lucy, Maude, The Six Million Dollar Man, The Secrets of Isis, The Streets of San Francisco, The Rookies, Kojak, Delvecchio, The Jeffersons, Archie Bunker’s Place, Hill Street Blues, Simon & Simon, St. Elsewhere, Trapper John, M.D., Cagney & Lacey, It's Garry Shandling's Show, Mr. Belvedere, Columbo: Exercise in Fatality, Barney Miller (as different characters in 4 episodes), Night Court, Airwolf, Just Shoot Me!, and M*A*S*H

== Personal life and death ==
Bruns married Jill Owens, a dancer on The Jackie Gleason Show, in 1969. Afterward, he married Laurie Franks, a Broadway star. He was lifetime friends with Peter O'Toole.

Until his death, Bruns resided in Hollywood with his wife, Laurie Franks (1929–2022). He died of natural causes at a hospital in Los Angeles on February 8, 2012.

== Partial filmography ==
- A Thousand Clowns (1965) - The Man in the Restaurant
- All Woman (1967) - Drunken Man
- The Swimmer (1968) - Biswangers' Pool Party Guest (uncredited)
- Midnight Cowboy (1969) - Man in TV Montage (uncredited)
- Jenny (1970) - Fred
- The Out-of-Towners (1970) - Officer Meyers
- Taking Off (1971) - Policeman
- The Gang That Couldn't Shoot Straight (1971) - Gallagher
- Silent Night, Bloody Night (1972) - Wilfred Butler (1929)
- Harry and Tonto (1974) - Burt
- The Great Waldo Pepper (1975) - Dillhoefer
- Flash and the Firecat (1975) - Mr. Walley
- Nickelodeon (1976) - Duncan
- Corvette Summer (1978) - Gil
- The Stunt Man (1980) - Ace
- My Favorite Year (1982) - Fed. Marshal Holt
- Blood Feud (1983) - Senator John L. McClellan
- Flashdance (1983) - Frank Szabo
- The Christmas Star (1986) - Lucky
- Amazon Women on the Moon (1987) - French Ventriloquist Dummy - Manager
- Return of the Living Dead Part II (1988) - Doc Mandel
- Seinfeld (1990) “The Stakeout” - Morty Seinfeld
- Dead Men Don't Die (1990) - Nolan
- The Opposite Sex and How to Live with Them (1992) - Irv Crown
- Love Bites (1993) - Vinnie Helsting
- Pentathlon (1994) - Vic
- Digital Man (1995) - Bob
- Ed (1996) - Clarence
- The Trigger Effect (1996) - Mr. Schaefer
- Johnny Skidmarks (1998) - Old Coot
- Inferno (1999) - Old Man Buyer (final film role)

== Sources ==
- Calvin, "Going Out of Business," Sanford and Son, NBC, 1974
- Calvin, "My Kingdom for a Horse" (also known as "First Night Out"), Sanford and Son, NBC, 1974
