= Love Bites (film) =

- Directed by: Malcolm Marmorstein
- Written by: Malcolm Marmorstein
- Produced by: Wayne Marmorstein
- Starring: Adam Ant; Kimberly Foster; Roger Rose; Michelle Forbes
- Cinematography: Stephen Lighthill
- Edited by: Robert Gordon
- Music by: Mark Koval
- Release date: 1993
- Running time: 98 minutes
- Country: United States
- Language: English

Love Bites (also known as Love Bites: The Reluctant Vampire) is a 1993 comedy film starring 1980s pop star Adam Ant, Kimberly Foster, Roger Rose and Michelle Forbes. The film was directed by Malcolm Marmorstein, who also wrote the screenplay.

== Plot ==
Dwight Putnum (Roger Rose) has just asked Kendall Gordon (Kimberly Foster) for the 10th time to marry him, but Kendall is still unwilling to commit. She has this idea that the perfect man for her is still out there. Vampire Zachary Simms (Adam Ant) has just awakened in his coffin from a 100-year sleep in the crypt under Kendall's house and comes out through the secret door in her fireplace to face the brave, new world. When the two meet, it isn't quite love at first bite, but Zachary spends the next day in her bed anyway. This angers Dwight when he tries to put the make on Zachary, thinking the lump under the covers is Kendall.

It doesn't take long before Kendall and Zachary become friends, and Zachary tells her how he came to be a vampire. He was born in England in 1660 and moved to Boston in 1675. In 1688, he was bitten by a vampire named Nerissa, and they lived together for 100 years before she suddenly decided to run off with a Washington politician. Zachary pined for Nerissa for the next one hundred years and finally decided to sleep it off. Unfortunately, he forgot to wake up until another one hundred years had passed.

Zachary is entranced by such devices as refrigerators, electric light bulbs, and cars that talk. Zachary is also entranced by Kendall, and before long, they are a twosome. Zachary decides to end his existence as a vampire and asks Kendall to help him in 'reviving his digestive system' so that he can eat human food. Before long, Zachary is slurping down spaghetti and munching on pizza. When he finds that he has a blood pressure, can go outside in the daytime, and drinking blood makes him gag, he proclaims himself 'rehumanized.' Everything is going great, until 1) Zachary lands a job with Dwight's insurance firm, 2) Dwight hires Vinnie Helsting (Philip Bruns) to do a little detective work on Zachary, and 3) Nerissa (Michelle Forbes) shows up wanting Zachary back.

Zachary starts working the night shift in the data entry department. One night he discovers $1,300,000 that has been moving from department to department in small increments. Dwight rewards him for his find by making him an executive vice president and giving him a company car. Within a short time, Zachary is using his bloodthirsty skills to put the bite on potential clients, proving that he can make a killing in the business. Unfortunately, he's spending less and less time with Kendall and becoming more and more of a yuppie. When Zachary suggests to the board of directors a plan that will increase their profits 30% each year for 100 years, they make him chief executive officer of the company, which effectively puts Dwight out of a job.

While Zachary is rapidly moving up the ladder, Helsting can't find anything on him. No birth certificate, no credit cards, no paper trail, so he begins tailing Zachary wherever he goes, taking photographs, and casing the house Zachary shares with Kendall. One night, when no one is home, Helsting enters the house, notices the secret door in the fireplace, and discovers the crypt and Zachary's coffin. While there, he overhears Zachary's message machine taking a phone call. 'Hello. I can't come to the phone right now. I'm dead.' Then Nerissa comes on, warning Zachary to be careful so that Dwight doesn't find out what Zachary really is. Helsting puts two and two together and figures it out...Zachary is a vampire.

It looks like Zachary is about to be defanged. Dwight wants his business back. Kendall says Zachary was more human when he was a vampire and wants him out of her life. Nerissa says that the only solution is to 'revamp' him, so she gets the process started by biting him on the neck. Dwight takes back his business, setting up Zachary as a consultant with a perpetual income that will make him rich for centuries. Kendall informs Zachary that she is pregnant with his baby and agrees to allow him to 'vampirize' her when the baby is old enough to understand. Nerissa agrees to become the baby's godmother and buy her pretty dresses and take her to Mets night games.

== Cast ==
- Adam Ant as Zachary Simms
- Kimberly Foster as Kendall Gordon
- Roger Rose as Dwight Putnam
- Michelle Forbes as Nerissa
- Philip Bruns as Vinnie Helsting
- Judy Tenuta as Sergeant Farfalloni
- Jacqueline Schultz as Paula
- Julie Strain as Female Jogger

== See also ==
- Vampire film
