= Walter F. Parkes =

American film producer (born 1951)

- Born: Walter Steven Fishman; April 15, 1951 (age 75); Bakersfield, California, U.S.
- Occupations: Film producer, screenwriter, media executive
- Spouse: Laurie MacDonald

Walter F. Parkes (born April 15, 1951) is an American producer, screenwriter, and media executive. The producer of more than 50 films, including the Men in Black series and Minority Report, he is the co-founder and co-chairman of Dreamscape Immersive.

Parkes and his wife and business partner, producer Laurie MacDonald, helped to build DreamWorks, with Parkes the head of its motion picture division, and the two later moved to Amblin Entertainment, where Parkes served as president. He has been nominated for three Academy Awards, receiving his first nomination as the director/ producer of the 1975 documentary The California Reich; his second for co-writing the original screenplay for WarGames; and his third as a producer of Awakenings. Parkes and MacDonald created the Parkes + Macdonald production company (P+M, P+M Image Nation) in 2010, collaborating on the productions of a number of films, including films that Amblin has released.

== Life and career ==
Parkes was born in Bakersfield, California. He attended Yale University, and graduated cum laude in 1973.

WarGames, co-written by Parkes with Lawrence Lasker and Walon Green, garnered a Best Original Screenplay Oscar nomination. Parkes and Lasker co-produced several films, including Sneakers and Awakenings, a Best Picture Oscar nominee in 1990. Other films Parkes produced or on which he served as executive producer include the Men in Black series, The Kite Runner, Golden Globe-winning Sweeney Todd, Dinner for Schmucks, Gladiator, Minority Report, Catch Me If You Can, The Ring, The Terminal, Lemony Snicket's A Series of Unfortunate Events, Road to Perdition, A.I. Artificial Intelligence, Deep Impact, Twister, The Legend of Zorro and Amistad.

In 1994, Parkes was named President of Steven Spielberg's Amblin Entertainment and later that year, he and his wife and business partner Laurie MacDonald were tapped to help create the DreamWorks SKG motion picture studio. As the studio's president, Parkes, in partnership with MacDonald, oversaw development and production of all DreamWorks' film projects, including three consecutive Best Picture Oscar winners: American Beauty, Gladiator and A Beautiful Mind — the latter two in partnership with Universal Studios. Other films produced during their tenure include: Cameron Crowe's Almost Famous, Robert Zemeckis' What Lies Beneath, Adam McKay's Anchorman: The Legend of Ron Burgundy, Michael Mann's Collateral, and Steven Spielberg's Academy Award- and Golden Globe-winning drama Saving Private Ryan, which was the top-grossing film domestically of 1998.

Parkes is a member of the Academy of Motion Picture Arts and Sciences, The Writers Guild of America and the Global Business Network. He is on the board of directors for the Center for a New American Security.

Parkes and MacDonald live in Santa Monica, California, and have two children, Jane MacDonald and Graham Joseph.

In 2023, Parkes won the Future of Life Award for reducing the risk of nuclear war through the power of storytelling.

== Parkes + MacDonald production company ==
Its origins go back to 1991 when Parkes and MacDonald founded their own production company Aerial Pictures, which was first set up at Columbia Pictures. In 1993, it was moved to 20th Century Fox. Later that year, it was moved and merged into Amblin Entertainment, and later to DreamWorks Pictures, so that Parkes could fill the seat left by the departure of Kathleen Kennedy.

In 2005, they revived the idea of having their own production company, which is called "Parkes + MacDonald Productions" (a.k.a. P+M), and set up at DreamWorks Pictures.

In 2012, the duo struck a deal with Imagenation Abu Dhabi (now Image Nation) to form a joint venture organization. Since then, P+M has collaborated on the productions of a number of films that Amblin and Image Nation have produced, including the Men in Black film series from the third film onwards.

== Filmography ==
=== Film ===
Producer

- The California Reich (1975) (Documentary film; also director and editor)
- Volunteers (1985)
- Project X (1987)
- True Believer (1989)
- Awakenings (1990)
- Sneakers (1992)
- Men in Black (1997)
- The Peacemaker (1997)
- The Time Machine (2002)
- Minority Report (2002)
- Men in Black II (2002)
- The Ring (2002)
- Catch Me If You Can (2002)
- The Terminal (2004)
- Lemony Snicket's A Series of Unfortunate Events (2004)
- The Ring Two (2005)
- The Island (2005)
- Just Like Heaven (2005)
- The Legend of Zorro (2005)
- The Lookout (2007)
- The Kite Runner (2007)
- Sweeney Todd: The Demon Barber of Fleet Street (2007)
- The Burning Plain (2008)
- The Uninvited (2009)
- Dinner for Schmucks (2010)
- Men in Black 3 (2012)
- Flight (2012)
- He Named Me Malala (2015) (Documentary film)
- Keeping Up with the Joneses (2016)
- Rings (2017)
- Men in Black: International (2019)

Executive producer

- Little Giants (1994)
- To Wong Foo, Thanks for Everything! Julie Newmar (1995)
- How to Make an American Quilt (1995)
- Twister (1996)
- The Trigger Effect (1996)
- Amistad (1997)
- Deep Impact (1998)
- Small Soldiers (1998)
- The Mask of Zorro (1998)
- Gladiator (2000)
- A.I. Artificial Intelligence (2001)
- Road to Perdition (2002)
- The Tuxedo (2002)
- Tulip Fever (2017)
- Free Solo (2018) (Documentary)
- The Trial of the Chicago 7 (2020)
- Gladiator II (2024)

Screenwriter

- WarGames (1983)
- Sneakers (1992)

=== Television ===
Year	Title	Writer	Executive Producer	Creator	Notes
1991	Eddie Dodd	Yes	Yes	Yes	6 episodes
1994	Birdland	Yes	Yes	Yes	7 episodes
1997-2001	Men in Black: The Series	No	Yes	No	53 episodes
2014	Crossbones	No	Yes	No	8 episodes
2015	The Slap	Yes	Yes	Developer	Miniseries
2015	Warrior	No	Yes	No	TV movie
