= Jeff Small =

American film studio executive (born 1973)

Jeff Small (born 1973) is an American film studio executive who is the chief executive officer of Amblin.

== Early life and education ==
He is a native of Marietta, Georgia and graduated from Stanford University.

== Career ==
Jeff first joined Amblin’s predecessor company DreamWorks Studios as president and chief operating officer in 2006, a role in which he served until being elevated to co-CEO in 2015 and later CEO in 2019.

Prior to arriving at DreamWorks, Jeff spent six years at Revolution Studios, first serving as the company’s head of strategic planning and business development, then as chief financial officer, and eventually, chief operating officer. Prior to joining Revolution, he spent several years with Universal Pictures in mergers and acquisitions after beginning his career in the Walt Disney Company Motion Picture Group.
