= The Legend of Zorro =

2005 swashbuckler film by Martin Campbell

- Theatrical release poster
- Directed by: Martin Campbell
- Screenplay by: Roberto Orci Alex Kurtzman
- Story by: Roberto Orci Alex Kurtzman Ted Elliott Terry Rossio
- Based on: Zorro by Johnston McCulley
- Produced by: Walter F. Parkes Laurie MacDonald Lloyd Phillips
- Starring: Antonio Banderas Catherine Zeta-Jones Rufus Sewell Nick Chinlund
- Cinematography: Phil Méheux
- Edited by: Stuart Baird
- Music by: James Horner
- Production companies: Columbia Pictures; Amblin Entertainment; Spyglass Entertainment; Parkes/MacDonald Productions
- Distributed by: Sony Pictures Releasing
- Release date: October 28, 2005
- Running time: 130 minutes
- Country: United States
- Languages: English; Spanish
- Budget: $75 million
- Box office: $142.4 million

The Legend of Zorro is a 2005 American Western swashbuckler film directed by Martin Campbell, produced by Walter F. Parkes, Laurie MacDonald and Lloyd Phillips, with music by James Horner, and written by Roberto Orci and Alex Kurtzman from a story by Ted Elliott and Terry Rossio. It is the sequel to 1998's The Mask of Zorro; Antonio Banderas and Catherine Zeta-Jones reprise their roles as the titular hero and his spouse, Elena, and Rufus Sewell stars as the villain, Count Armand. The film takes place in San Mateo County, California and was shot in San Luis Potosí, Mexico, with second-unit photography in Wellington, New Zealand. The film was theatrically released on October 28, 2005, by Sony Pictures Releasing.

The Legend of Zorro earned $142.4 million on a $75 million budget. It received poor reviews, with critics generally praising its acting, but criticizing the screenplay, special effects, tone and humor.

== Plot ==
In 1850, California votes on whether to join the United States. Zorro, formerly Alejandro Murrieta, now known to the public as Don Alejandro De La Vega, foils a plot to steal the ballots. During the fight with a gunman named Jacob McGivens, he loses his mask, and two Pinkerton agents see his face. Alejandro's marriage with his wife, Elena, becomes strained after he refuses to stop being Zorro when the election ends. The couple argue, and Alejandro moves out. The following day, the Pinkertons confront Elena, who later divorces Alejandro.

Three months have passed and Alejandro feels demoralized by the people's separation from Zorro, while his son, Joaquin, is causing trouble at school with his teacher. Father Felipe takes him to a party at French Count Armand's vineyard, where he learns Elena is dating Armand, an old friend from Spain. Drunk and angry, Alejandro causes a scene and leaves the party. He later witnesses, in his drunken state, an explosion near the vineyard, raising his suspicions about Armand. The next day, McGivens attacks Guillermo, Alejandro's farmer friend, to seize the deed to his land. Zorro saves Guillermo's wife and son, but Guillermo is killed.

While at Armand's mansion for a date, Elena surreptitiously investigates his secret study, discovering information about a plot involving explosives and a group called Orbis Unum (One Globe in Latin). Zorro sneaks into the mansion and overhears Armand discussing his plan to build a railroad through Cortez's land with McGivens.

The next day, Joaquin sneaks out of a class field trip and hides on McGivens's cart. McGivens's bandits catch Joaquin as they receive a cargo shipment in a cove. Zorro saves Joaquin from the bandits and sees that the cargo consists of bars of soap, with the phrase Orbis Unum printed on the crates. Father Felipe tells Alejandro it is the symbol of the Knights of Aragon, a secret society that Armand is a member of, which has secretly ruled Europe for millennia. The Knights have deemed the United States a threat and plan to destroy it.

The Pinkertons capture and imprison Alejandro. They reveal that they confronted Elena with knowledge of his identity as Zorro, and blackmailed her into divorcing Alejandro and seducing Armand to learn of the Knights' plans without Zorro's aid as they cannot legally search Armand's home since California was yet to become a U.S. state. Joaquin frees Alejandro from captivity.

At Armand's mansion, Zorro finds Elena. They spy on Armand as he gives a speech to the Knights, revealing the soap bars contain glycerol to make nitroglycerin weapons. He even tested the weapon on a Knight who was preparing to walk away. The vineyard is a cover for the production, which will be given to the Confederate army under Colonel R.S. Beauregard, to launch a sneak attack on Washington, D.C., and destroy the Union. Zorro and Elena reconcile while he prepares to destroy the train carrying the explosives. McGivens arrives at Felipe's church to look for Zorro. Unable to find him, he shoots Felipe and kidnaps Joaquin. Armand discovers Elena's deception and takes her hostage with Joaquin after sending his valet Ferroq to kill the Pinkertons and her carrier pigeon. Zorro is captured after disabling an explosive under the train and is unmasked in front of his son. Armand takes Joaquin and Elena away on the train and orders McGivens to kill Alejandro. Felipe, saved from the bullet by the cross he wears, rescues Alejandro, who kills McGivens by trapping him on a pulley in which a single drop of nitroglycerin hit his head, torching him.

Zorro catches up to the train, fights Armand, and Elena helps Joaquin escape. She fights Ferroq, throws him from the train with nitro in his suit, and in front of a checkpoint where Colonel Beauregard and his men are waiting, killing them all but inadvertently causing the train to change tracks, heading straight for the Governor’s signing ceremony further down the track. Joaquin rides Zorro's horse, Tornado, off the train and diverts it away from the signing ceremony. After a tense battle Zorro overpowers Armand, ties him to the engine and escapes with Elena just before the train derails from the unfinished tracks, igniting the nitroglycerin and killing Armand.

The governor signs the bill, making California the 31st U.S. state. Alejandro remarries Elena and apologizes to Joaquin for his secrecy, recognizing Zorro's identity should be a family secret. With Elena's support, Zorro rides off on Tornado to his next mission.

== Cast ==
- Antonio Banderas as Don Alejandro de la Vega / Zorro, a masked vigilante and warrior
- Catherine Zeta-Jones as Elena de la Vega, Alejandro's wife
- Rufus Sewell as Count Armand, a French Count that commands the Knights of Aragon
- Nick Chinlund as Jacob McGivens, a deeply religious outlaw working secretly for Armand
- Adrián Alonso as Joaquin de la Vega, Alejandro and Elena's son who doesn't know his father's secret
- Julio Oscar Mechoso as Padre Felipe, a priest and ally to Zorro
- Shuler Hensley as Pike, a Pinkerton Agent
- Michael Emerson as Harrigan, a Pinkerton Agent
- Leo Burmester as Colonel R.S. Beauregard (Note: Not to be confused with the real-life Confederate general P. G. T. Beauregard.), a Confederate General in league with Armand
- Tony Amendola as Padre Quintero, a priest and Joaquin's school teacher
- Pedro Armendáriz Jr. as Governor Riley
- Gustavo Sánchez Parra as Guillermo Cortez, a farmer who borrowed money from Alejandro
- Giovanna Zacarias as Blanca Cortez, Guillermo's wife
- Raúl Méndez as Ferroq, Armand's valet and assassin
- Alberto Reyes as Padre Ignacio

== Music ==
The Legend of Zorro: Original Motion Picture Soundtrack

Film score by James Horner
- Released: October 25, 2005
- Recorded: 2004–2005
- Length: 75:34
- Label: Sony

James Horner chronology
Flightplan (2005)	The Legend of Zorro: Original Motion Picture Soundtrack (2005)	The New World (2005)

Professional ratings
Review scores
Source	Rating
SoundtrackNet	3.5/5 stars

Track listing

No.	Title	Length
1.	"Collecting the Ballots"	3:27
2.	"Stolen Votes"	6:31
3.	"To the Governor's... And Then Elena"	4:05
4.	"This Is Who I Am"	3:05
5.	"Classroom Justice"	1:50
6.	"The Cortez Ranch"	6:35
7.	"A Proposal with Pearls / Perilous Times"	3:58
8.	"Joaquin's Capture and Zorro's Rescue"	5:00
9.	"Jailbreak / Reunited"	5:36
10.	"A Dinner of Pigeon / Setting the Explosives"	5:04
11.	"Mad Dash / Zorro Unmasked"	3:20
12.	"Just One Drop of Nitro"	2:40
13.	"The Train"	11:11
14.	"Statehood Proclaimed"	5:00
15.	"My Family Is My Life..."	8:14

== Release ==
The Legend of Zorro opened October 28, 2005 in 3,520 theaters in the United States and Canada and 6,140 screens in 50 other territories. It opened at number two at the US box office with an opening weekend gross of $16.3 million and at number one in 34 international territories with a combined gross of $28.5 million (including $6 million in France), for a worldwide opening weekend gross of $44.8 million.

== Reception ==
The Legend of Zorro currently holds a rating of 47 out of 100 on Metacritic, based on 33 reviews, indicating "mixed or average reviews". It holds a 27% "Rotten" score on review aggregator Rotten Tomatoes, based on 139 reviews. The site's critics consensus states: "Zorro can survive a lot of things, but it looks like he can't survive marriage". Audiences polled by CinemaScore gave the film an average grade of "A−" on an A+ to F scale.

Roger Ebert of the Chicago Sun-Times gave the film a below-average review, awarding it one and a half out of four stars, commenting that "of all of the possible ideas about how to handle the Elena character, this movie has assembled the worst ones." James Berardinelli of ReelViews gave The Legend of Zorro two out of four stars, saying that "the action is routine", "the chemistry between the two leads, which was one of the highlights of The Mask of Zorro, has evaporated during the intervening years", and that the movie "fails to recapture the pleasure offered by The Mask of Zorro."

Stephanie Zacharek of Salon praised the film, calling it "entertaining, bold, and self-effacing at once", noting the civic and parental questions it raises. Slate Magazine critic David Edelstein also praised the film, in particular the action scenes, villains, and chemistry between Banderas and Zeta-Jones. Mick LaSalle of the San Francisco Chronicle said the film was "watchable – not remotely enjoyable, but watchable." Nathan Rabin of The Onion's A.V. Club gave the film a lukewarm review, saying that "director Martin Campbell doles out action sequences stingily", and added that "The Legend of Zorro still feels like a half-hearted shrug of a sequel." Brian Lowry of Variety said that The Legend of Zorro is "considerably less charming than The Mask of Zorro", but added that the film "gets by mostly on dazzling stunt work and the pleasure of seeing its dashing and glamorous leads back in cape and gown." Lisa Schwarzbaum of Entertainment Weekly awarded the film a "B−" score. Schwarzbaum said that "too many scenes emphasize gross butchery over the elegance of the blade", but added that the film is "well-oiled" and praised the "fancy fight sequences".

Stephen Hunter of The Washington Post reacted negatively, calling The Legend of Zorro "a waste of talent, time, and money" and "stupid and boring". Marc Savlov of the Austin Chronicle was also not impressed, remarking that "there are precious few things for a Zorro fan – or a film fan, for that matter – not to loathe about The Legend of Zorro." The film did reasonably well at the box office, grossing $142,400,065 internationally, but did not match the success of its predecessor.

== Home media ==
The film was released on DVD and VHS on January 31, 2006. It was later released on Blu-ray on December 11, 2007. A 4K UHD version was later released on August 22, 2023.

== Cancelled crossover sequel ==
In June 2019, Quentin Tarantino had picked Jerrod Carmichael to co-write a film adaptation based on his crossover comic book series, Django/Zorro which was a crossover with Django Unchained. Tarantino and Jamie Foxx have both expressed interest in having Antonio Banderas reprise his role as Zorro from The Mask of Zorro and The Legend of Zorro in the film in addition to Foxx returning as Django Freeman. In a 2022 interview with GQ, Carmichael revealed that the film had been cancelled. In April 2026, the film reentered development with Brian Helgeland writing the screenplay.
