= Amblin Entertainment =

American film production company

Amblin Entertainment, Inc.
- Logo used since 2015
- Formerly: Amblin Productions (1975–1984)
- Type: Subsidiary
- Industry: Film
- Founded: 1975; 51 years ago
- Founders: Steven Spielberg
- Headquarters: Universal City, California, U.S.
- Area served: Worldwide
- Key people: Steven Spielberg (chairman); Jeff Small (CEO); Holly Bario (president of production)
- Products: Motion pictures
- Services: Film production
- Parent: Amblin Partners (2015–present) (Note: Via a joint venture between Reliance Entertainment, Lionsgate Studios, Alibaba Pictures, and Universal Pictures.)
- Website: amblin.com/movie/

Amblin Entertainment, Inc., formerly named Amblin Productions, is an American film production company founded by filmmaker Steven Spielberg in 1975, with Kathleen Kennedy, and Frank Marshall joining later in 1980. Its headquarters are located in Bungalow 477 of the Universal Studios backlot in Universal City, California, with an additional office in New York City. It distributes all of the films from Amblin Partners under the Amblin Entertainment banner.

== History ==
Amblin is named after Steven Spielberg's first commercially released film, Amblin' (1968), a short independent film about a man and woman hitchhiking through the desert. Costing $15,000 to produce, it was shown for Universal Studios, giving Spielberg more directing roles.

The company was established a year later, in 1969, and it was properly incorporated in 1970. On July 14, 1975, Spielberg signed a four-picture agreement with Universal Pictures to produce its feature films through his Amblin label, aiming to build upon the success of its first two theatrical pictures, The Sugarland Express and Jaws. Although Amblin is an independent production company, Universal distributes many Amblin productions, and Amblin operates out of a building on the Universal lot.

In 1978, the company produced its first film, I Wanna Hold Your Hand, directed by Robert Zemeckis, with Spielberg serving as executive producer. This was followed in 1980 by Used Cars, directed again by Zemeckis, and again executive produced by Spielberg. Later that year, Kathleen Kennedy, formerly of John Milius' A-Team Productions, and Frank Marshall joined as production associates, later becoming partners.

Amblin produced its first film with its company name, Continental Divide, in 1981, with Spielberg serving as executive producer. The following year, Spielberg and Marshall caught the attention of Metro-Goldwyn-Mayer (MGM), for which they both produced Poltergeist with Amblin, but under the name Steven Spielberg Productions. The same year, Spielberg and Kennedy produced E.T. the Extra-Terrestrial with Amblin uncredited (with Spielberg also directing it), which ended up being the highest-grossing film of the year.

In 1983, Spielberg produced Twilight Zone: The Movie with Amblin (with Marshall credited as an executive producer), but the company was uncredited. The company was reincorporated as Amblin Entertainment the following year, and the television division was formed that year. Amblin went on to produce a number of successful films throughout the 1980s, such as Gremlins, Innerspace, Batteries Not Included, Who Framed Roger Rabbit, and the Back to the Future trilogy. Gremlins was the first film to use the company's logo, which features the silhouette of Elliott flying in his bicycle with E.T. in the basket in front of the moon, from E.T. the Extra-Terrestrial.

In 1985, Spielberg and Don Bluth started a partnership to produce animated feature films. The only two films that were made from the Spielberg-Bluth deal were An American Tail (1986) and The Land Before Time (1988).

On November 5, 1986, Walt Disney Pictures and Amblin Entertainment collaborated to produce Who Framed Roger Rabbit, its first collaboration of such after collaborations working with Universal Pictures and Warner Bros. Pictures, which had a pre-existing joint deal. The film was directed by Robert Zemeckis, and it was slated for a G-rated feature, but it was upped to a PG-rated feature under the Touchstone Pictures label.

In 1987, Amblin Entertainment had named Brad Globe, former head of Lorimar's marketing division, as vice president of marketing at the production company, and Globe himself would be joined by two special consultants, which were Martin J. Lewy and Gerry Lewis, and will work closely with the marketing department of the companies that released Amblin's product.

In 1989, a dispute over film-making budgets caused Spielberg and Bluth to part ways. Amblin established their own animation unit, Amblimation, which was headquartered in London. The only three films that were released under the Amblimation banner were An American Tail: Fievel Goes West (1991), We're Back: A Dinosaur's Story (1993) and Balto (1995). The Amblimation label was shut down in 1997 and most of the studio staff was transferred to DreamWorks Animation, which Spielberg co-founded in 1994. Two more films were in development at the time Amblimation was shut down. The first was an animated film adaptation of the Andrew Lloyd Webber musical Cats which was cancelled following the studio's closure in 1997. The other was an animated film adaptation of the William Steig book, Shrek!, which was picked up by DreamWorks Animation and made into the 2001 animated film Shrek. The same year, Amblin signed a deal with Turner Network Television to produce television films.

In 1990, Frank Marshall made his directorial debut at Amblin with Arachnophobia. In 1991, Marshall left the company after 10 years. The next year, Kathleen Kennedy left the company. In 1992, Amblin launched a visual effects studio Amblin Imaging, headed by visual effects pioneer John Gross. It was later shut down in 1995. In 1993, Walter Parkes and Laurie MacDonald joined the company. Earlier that year, the company had signed a deal with Extreme Studios to develop properties for motion pictures and television. In 1994, Spielberg, Jeffrey Katzenberg and David Geffen formed a startup, DreamWorks SKG, with a plan to integrate Amblin and Geffen Pictures into DreamWorks.

On June 21, 2021, it was announced that Amblin Entertainment signed a deal with Netflix to release multiple new feature films for the streaming service. Under the deal, Amblin is expected to produce at least two films a year for Netflix for an unspecified number of years. It is possible that Spielberg may even direct some of the projects.

== Film library ==
=== Film series ===
Years	Title	Distributor
1984–present	Gremlins	Warner Bros. Pictures
1985–present	The Goonies	Warner Bros. Pictures
1985–1990	Back to the Future	Universal Pictures
1986–1999	An American Tail	Universal Pictures
1988–2016	The Land Before Time	Universal Pictures
1988–1993; 2013	Who Framed Roger Rabbit	Buena Vista Pictures Distribution Inc
1993–present	Jurassic Park	Universal Pictures
1996–2024	Twister	Universal Pictures Warner Bros. Pictures
1997–2019	Men in Black	Sony Pictures Releasing
1998–2005	The Mask of Zorro	Sony Pictures Releasing

== Theme park attractions ==
While Amblin has never had its own theme park, theme parks have made rides based on Amblin films and co-productions.

- Back to the Future: The Ride, a simulator ride at Universal Studios Japan. This ride ceased operation on May 31, 2016. The ride also existed at Universal Studios Florida and Universal Studios Hollywood.
- Great Gremlins Adventure, a dark ride at Warner Bros. Movie World that closed in 2001, with a second version at Movie Park Germany that closed in 2004.
- Jurassic Park: The Ride, a water ride at Universal Studios Hollywood until 2018, when it was replaced by Jurassic World: The Ride.
- Men in Black: Alien Attack, a dark ride at Universal Studios Florida.
- Roger Rabbit's Car Toon Spin, a dark ride in Mickey's Toontown, a land at Disneyland and Tokyo Disneyland.
- Twister...Ride It Out, an attraction at Universal Studios Florida that closed on November 2, 2015.
- E.T. Adventure, a dark ride at Universal Studios Florida. Also existed at Universal Studios Hollywood and Universal Studios Japan.
