= Dead Men Don't Die =

1990 American horror-comedy film

- Directed by: Malcolm Marmorstein
- Written by: Malcolm Marmorstein
- Produced by: Howard K. Grossman
- Starring: Elliott Gould; Melissa Sue Anderson
- Cinematography: Tom Fraser
- Music by: Mark Koval; David C. Williams
- Release date: 1990
- Language: English

Dead Men Don't Die is a 1990 American horror-comedy film written and directed by Malcolm Marmorstein and starring Elliott Gould and Melissa Sue Anderson.

== Plot ==
News anchor Barry Baron (Elliott Gould) discovers that a drug smuggling ring is operating out of the building where he works, and is chased down and eventually shot dead by the drug dealers. His co-anchor, Dulcie Niles (Melissa Sue Anderson) finds Barry's body, calls the police and prepares to film the investigation, but before the police can arrive Barry's body is stolen by the building's cleaner, Chafuka (Mabel King), who uses her voodoo powers to reanimate Barry's corpse as a zombie, allowing her to take over Barry's luxury apartment.

In order to keep up appearances, Chafuka has Barry, who is otherwise unable to speak, continue performing his news broadcasts by controlling him with a voodoo doll, while Dulcie continues to investigate the drug ring with the help of incompetent police detective Jordan Penrose (Mark Moses). Meanwhile, the head of the drug ring, Nolan (Phil Bruns) sees one of Barry's news broadcasts and assumes that his henchmen bungled Barry's murder, and sends them to finish the job off. When they arrive at the station however, they end up being killed in a series of mishaps, and Chafuka turns them into more zombies.

On seeing his zombified former henchmen, Nolan panics and takes refuge with the station's owner, Alex Cavanaugh (Jack Betts), who it turns out is the mastermind behind the drug ring. He takes Dulcie and Jordan hostage and has Nolan drive them to safety, while Barry, Chafuka and the zombie henchmen give chase. During the course of the chase Dulcie and Jordan are rescued, and then Nolan loses control of the car, with both he and Cavanaugh being killed in the resulting crash. Chafuka turns Cavanaugh and Nolan into zombies and then takes full control of the station, with Barry continuing as lead anchor after his original personality fully returns, and Jordan quitting the police to become the station's head of security, with the zombie Nolan and his henchmen becoming security guards.

== Cast ==
- Elliott Gould as Barry Baron
- Melissa Sue Anderson as Dulcie Niles
- Mark Moses as Jordan Penrose
- Mabel King as Chafuka
- Jack Betts as Alex Cavanaugh
- Phil Bruns as Nolan
- Robert Dryer as Mungo
- Robert Covarrubias as Carlos
- Phil Shipko as Frank
- Stanley Kamel as Archie
- Jerome Guardino as Neal Guardino

== Reception ==
Author Terry Rowan in his book "The Book of the Undead A Zombie Film Guide" rated it a one-star and said "Sorry I couldn't stomach this film."

In the book "Creature Features: The Science Fiction, Fantasy, and Horror Movie Guide," John Stanley rated it a one-star.
