= The Lookout (2007 film) =

2007 film by Scott Frank

- Theatrical release poster
- Directed by: Scott Frank
- Written by: Scott Frank
- Produced by: Walter Parkes; Laurence Mark; Gary Barber; Roger Birnbaum
- Starring: Joseph Gordon-Levitt; Jeff Daniels; Matthew Goode; Bruce McGill; Isla Fisher
- Cinematography: Alar Kivilo
- Edited by: Jill Savitt
- Music by: James Newton Howard
- Production companies: Miramax Films; Spyglass Entertainment; Laurence Mark Productions; Birnbaum/Barber Productions; Parkes+MacDonald Productions
- Distributed by: Miramax Films
- Release date: March 30, 2007
- Running time: 98 minutes
- Language: English
- Budget: $16 million
- Box office: $5.4 million

The Lookout is a 2007 American crime film written and directed by Scott Frank, in his directorial debut, and starring Joseph Gordon-Levitt, Jeff Daniels, Matthew Goode, Bruce McGill, and Isla Fisher. The film was released by Miramax Films on March 30, 2007. While it received positive reviews the film was nevertheless a box-office bomb, grossing $5.4 million against a $16 million budget.

== Plot ==
Driving at night with his lights off on a rural road to show off the dancing fireflies in the dark, high school hockey star Chris Pratt crashes into a combine. Two of his friends are killed, while he and his girlfriend Kelly survive. The crash leaves Chris with lasting mental impairments, including anterograde amnesia, disinhibition, and anger management issues, and ends his promising hockey career.

Four years later, Chris and Kelly, who lost her leg in the accident, no longer talk. Chris takes cognitive therapy classes at the life center to re-learn life skills, including the simple sequencing of daily tasks, such as showering, to compensate for his inability to remember. He writes down notes and reminders in a small notebook. He is emotionally supported by his roommate, a blind man named Lewis, and receives financial support from his wealthy family, from whom he is emotionally distant. He works nights as a janitor in a small-town bank, where his friend Ted, a sheriff's deputy, checks in on Chris every night. As he practices sequencing, Chris tries to convince the bank's manager, Mr. Tuttle, to allow him a teller job, to no avail.

Chris comes under the scrutiny of a gang planning to rob the bank. Their leader Gary, who knew Chris from high school before his accident, befriends him and uses his accomplice, a woman with the stage name Luvlee Lemons, to seduce him. Gary manipulates Chris into going along with their scheme by using his insecurities and limitations since the accident, causing Chris to start lashing out at his friends, including Lewis. Lewis, who recognizes that Luvlee is manipulating Chris, confronts her, and she leaves Chris and the gang before the robbery.

On the night of the robbery, Mr. Tuttle acknowledges Chris' strengths and offers to discuss the teller job. Chris has a change of heart but the gang forces him to empty the vault at gunpoint. Ted stumbles upon the robbery; in the ensuing shootout, Ted kills two of the robbers, and fatally wounds Gary before one of the other members, Bone, shoots Ted dead. Escaping in the getaway car, Chris discovers the stolen money in the trunk and realizes that the gang was planning to kill and frame him for the whole thing.

Gary and Bone take Lewis hostage to get the money back. Using his sequencing skills, Chris hatches a plan to save his friend and take down the robbers. He sneaks into his parents' home to take one of their guns, hides it in one of the money bags, and buries the money at the road of his accident. The robbers force him to take them to the buried cash.

While Chris digs in the snow, Gary's wounded condition deteriorates. As Bone prepares to shoot Lewis, Chris shoots Bone dead with the shotgun he stashed in the money bag. Gary collapses and dies. Chris returns the money to the bank and turns himself in, but the FBI investigation concludes that he was not responsible due to his mental condition; because the robbers failed to disconnect the video surveillance, the FBI sees that Chris was forced to act at gunpoint.

Chris and Lewis open a small restaurant together with a loan from Mr. Tuttle. As Chris reflects on his accident, he reconciles with his father and hopes Kelly will forgive him and that one day he will find the courage to apologize to her.

== Cast ==
- Joseph Gordon-Levitt as Chris Pratt
- Jeff Daniels as Lewis
- Matthew Goode as Gary Spargo
- Bruce McGill as Robert Pratt, Chris's father
- Isla Fisher as "Luvlee" Lemons
- Carla Gugino as Janet, Chris's caseworker
- Alberta Watson as Barbara Pratt, Chris's mother
- Alex Borstein as Mrs. Lange
- Sergio Di Zio as Deputy Ted
- David Huband as Mr. Tuttle
- Laura Vandervoort as Kelly
- Greg Dunham as "Bone"
- Morgan Kelly as Marty
- Aaron Berg as "Cork"

== Production ==
Although set near Kansas City, Missouri, the bank in the movie was filmed in the town of Hartney, Manitoba, using the town's Museum, and city scenes were filmed in Winnipeg, Manitoba. Scenes of the skating rink were filmed behind the Millennium Library, and the exterior of Chris's apartment was filmed in the Exchange District and various historic sites in Winnipeg including the Bank of Montreal (1911–13), the Ambassador Apartments (1909), the interior of the Market Building (1899) and the James Ashdown House at 529 Wellington (1913). The Ambassador Apartments appear on the film's poster.

== Reception ==
The Lookout has an aggregated score of 87% at Rotten Tomatoes based on 164 reviews. The critical consensus reads, "The Lookout is a genuinely suspenseful and affecting noir due to the great ensemble cast and their complex, realistic characters." On Metacritic, the film has a score 73 out of 100 based on 33 reviews, indicating "generally favorable reviews". Particularly favorable reviews came from Richard Roeper and Leonard Maltin, with the latter praising the film as "the best movie so far" of the first half of 2007.

The Lookout won the award for Best First Feature at the 2008 Independent Spirit Awards.

== Soundtrack ==
The score was composed by James Newton Howard and was his first collaboration with director Scott Frank. Frequent collaborators Stuart Michael Thomas and Clay Duncan are credited with additional music. The score was orchestrated by Brad Dechter, Thomas, and Chris P. Bacon, who also conducted. Several songs were featured including "One Big Holiday" and "Lay Low", both performed by My Morning Jacket.
