= The Burning Plain =

2008 film by Guillermo Arriaga

- Theatrical release poster
- Directed by: Guillermo Arriaga
- Written by: Guillermo Arriaga
- Produced by: Walter F. Parkes; Laurie MacDonald
- Starring: Charlize Theron; Kim Basinger; Jennifer Lawrence
- Cinematography: Robert Elswit
- Edited by: Craig Wood
- Music by: Omar Rodríguez-López; Hans Zimmer
- Production companies: Wild Bunch; 2929 Productions
- Distributed by: Magnolia Pictures
- Release dates: August 29, 2008 (Venice); September 18, 2009 (United States); July 23, 2010 (Mexico)
- Running time: 107 minutes
- Countries: United States; Argentina
- Languages: English; Spanish
- Budget: $20 million
- Box office: $5.5 million

The Burning Plain is a 2008 drama film directed and written by Guillermo Arriaga and starring Charlize Theron, Jennifer Lawrence, Kim Basinger and Joaquim de Almeida. In Arriaga's directorial debut, he films a story that has multipart story strands woven together as in his previous screenplays. Filming of The Burning Plain began in New Mexico in November 2007, and the film was released in late 2008 in various festivals, before a limited theatrical release in 2009 by Magnolia Pictures. The film was a critical and commercial failure, grossing $5.5 million against a $20 million budget.

== Plot ==
Typical of Arriaga's works, this film is told in a nonlinear narrative, where events are revealed out of sequence. The following plot summary is in chronological order, thus does not reflect the exact sequence of the events as seen on screen.

The story starts some time during the mid-1990s in a small town near Las Cruces, New Mexico (close to the border with Mexico), where Gina, a wife and mother to four children, is introduced. Gina is having an affair with a local man named Nick Martinez, who also has a family of his own, but unbeknownst to the two, Gina's teenaged daughter Mariana finds out about their love affair. Mariana follows her mother to Nick's trailer. Knowing the two are inside, and in an effort to make them end their affair, she disconnects the gas pipe leading into the trailer and sets it on fire. The flames eventually reach a gas tank, which explodes, consuming the entire trailer and claiming Nick and Gina's lives, although Mariana had no intention of killing either of them. After Gina and Nick's funeral, Mariana and Nick's son, Santiago, slowly begin to develop a relationship of their own. Mariana soon becomes aware that she is pregnant with Santiago's daughter. The two flee to Mexico amid disapproval from their families and decide to have the baby there; after she gives birth to their daughter, Mariana abandons her family and changes her name to Sylvia.

More than a decade later, Sylvia is working at a high-end restaurant in Oregon. Despite her success, she does not have any stable relationships but only casual encounters, and has persistent thoughts of suicide. Here, a mysterious man follows her around. It is Carlos, a close friend and business partner of Santiago. After an accident involving their crop-dusting plane, the hospitalized Santiago urges Carlos to look for Sylvia, for whom Santiago has been searching since she abandoned him and their two-day-old daughter.

Because Carlos does not speak English and Sylvia does not speak Spanish, he has trouble explaining to her the purpose of his visit. Instead, he surprises Sylvia with her now 12-year-old daughter, Maria. Maria, who was already reluctant to meet her estranged mother, is heartbroken when Sylvia hastily departs without speaking to either when she sees Maria and Carlos waiting for her outside her home. After realizing her mistake, Sylvia enlists the help of her friend Laura to find Carlos and Maria.

After reuniting, Sylvia, Maria, and Carlos go to Mexico, where Sylvia apologizes to Maria for the years she has been absent from her life. They visit Santiago, who is sedated due to the extent of his injuries. Sylvia confesses her past sins by his bedside, unsure if he will ever wake up again. The doctor reassures them that he will be fine, and the story concludes on a hopeful note.

== Cast ==
- Charlize Theron as Sylvia / Mariana
  - Jennifer Lawrence as young Mariana
- Kim Basinger as Gina
- Joaquim de Almeida as Nick Martinez
- John Corbett as John
- Robin Tunney as Laura
- Brett Cullen as Robert
- Danny Pino as Santiago Martinez
  - J.D. Pardo as young Santiago
- José María Yazpik as Carlos Alarid
- Tessa Ía as Maria Martinez
- Rachel Ticotin as Ana
- Diego J. Torres as Cristobal Martinez
- Rafael Hernández as Doctor Armendariz
- Jeffrey Donovan as crop duster

== Production ==
The Burning Plain was written and directed by Guillermo Arriaga in his directorial debut after writing the screenplays for director Alejandro González Iñárritu's films Amores perros (2000), 21 Grams (2003), and Babel (2006). Arriaga said that he wanted to write a script for himself to direct after 11 years of scriptwriting. The writer-director described the premise, "There are very intense love stories here that take place in different places and times, with characters trying to find the healing powers of love, forgiveness and redemption." Arriaga wrote the story of The Burning Plain to weave together multipart story strands. The film was financed by 2929 Productions, and Constantini Films and The Weinstein Company purchased the rights to distribute The Burning Plain in Latin America. The film had a budget of under $20 million. The Burning Plain began filming in New Mexico on November 5, 2007. Other filming took place in Portland and Depoe Bay in Oregon.

== Release ==
The Burning Plain was screened at TIFF, the Toronto International Film Festival, in September 2008, followed by screenings at Virginia Film Festival in Charlottesville the last weekend of October, and the Savannah Film Festival, which was held from October 25 to November 1, 2008. It was an entrant of the international competition of the 65th Venice International Film Festival. The Burning Plain was released in theaters on September 18, 2009.

== Reception ==
=== Critical reception ===
The Burning Plain has received generally poor reviews from critics. As of June 2020, it holds a 38% approval rating on Rotten Tomatoes, based on 79 reviews with an average rating of 4.93/10. The website's critics consensus reads: "This heavily symbolic, melodramatic multi-narrative drama lacks emotional resonance." Metacritic assigned a score of 45 out of 100 based on 18 reviews, indicating "mixed or average reviews".

Of the most positive reviews, David Gritten writing for The Daily Telegraph decided that it "has all the right credentials: it is serious-minded and dramatic, with universal themes and a clutch of fine acting performances." Wendy Ide, writing for The Times, stated that it is an "elegantly structured tale of lives laced together with tragedy and guilt." Ide also praised Theron's performance and concluded that it is a "quality production."

According to Time Out, "Arriaga has delivered a compelling and entertaining debut that stays true to his earlier interests."

=== Box office ===
The film grossed $58,749 in its first weekend in North America. It grossed $200,730 domestically and $5,267,917 in foreign countries, for a total of $5,468,647 worldwide.

== See also ==
- The Burning Plain, Mexican literary classic of the same name
