= The Trigger Effect =

- Theatrical release poster
- Directed by: David Koepp
- Written by: David Koepp
- Produced by: Michael Grillo
- Starring: Kyle MacLachlan; Elisabeth Shue; Dermot Mulroney; Michael Rooker
- Cinematography: Newton Thomas Sigel
- Edited by: Jill Savitt
- Music by: James Newton Howard
- Production company: Amblin Entertainment
- Distributed by: Gramercy Pictures
- Release dates: May 16, 1996 (SIFF); August 30, 1996 (United States)
- Running time: 94 minutes
- Country: United States
- Language: English
- Budget: $8 million
- Box office: $3.6 million

The Trigger Effect is a 1996 American thriller film written and directed by David Koepp (in his feature directorial debut) and starring Kyle MacLachlan, Elisabeth Shue and Dermot Mulroney. It is the only Amblin Entertainment film to be distributed by Gramercy Pictures. The film follows the downward spiral of society during a widespread and lengthy power outage in Southern California. The film was inspired by the 1978 documentary television series Connections, and the 1960 The Twilight Zone episode "The Monsters Are Due on Maple Street", which starred Koepp's uncle, actor Claude Akins.

The Trigger Effect explores the idea that a simple power outage can potentially trigger a chain of largely unfavorable events, implying that modern society cannot live peacefully together without technology. Most of the film was shot in Los Angeles, where Koepp was based at the time. The film grossed $3.6 million in a limited theatrical release in the United States and drew mixed reviews from critics, who highlighted its surreal and enveloping style as well as the performances by the lead actors. Criticism was targeted at its safe and predictable ending. A novel based on the film and written by Dewey Gram was released in September 1996 by Berkley Books.

== Plot ==
Annie and Matthew, a young married couple, find their infant daughter screaming with a high temperature and an earache. Matthew calls the doctor, who promises to phone in a prescription to the pharmacist the following day. During the night, the neighborhood wakes up due to a massive power outage. When Matthew visits the pharmacist the next day, he is unable to get the required medicine due to the blackout. Matthew steals the medicine when the pharmacist is not looking. Social unrest ensues due to the persistent blackout, leading Matthew and his wife's best friend, Joe, to buy a shotgun, and for Joe to stay with them during the outage.

When an intruder breaks into the couple's house the following night, Matthew and Joe chase him outside, where a neighbor shoots the intruder. The neighbors conspire to cover up the fact that the deceased intruder was not armed. As the blackout continues for days over a large area, more chaos occurs. As a result, the group decides to flee to Annie's parents' house, 530 miles away. They do not have enough fuel to travel the whole way, so they stop by an abandoned car hoping to siphon some. A man, Gary, is lying in the backseat. After Joe notices that Gary has a handgun, he heads back to their vehicle to get his own shotgun. Joe aims the shotgun at Gary to scare him off, but he shoots Joe and steals their vehicle.

Matthew walks an hour to a farmhouse to try to get help for his family. The occupant, Raymond, refuses to help him initially, as he does not trust him. Matthew collects the shotgun and returns to the house, hoping to steal the car. He breaks in to get the car keys, and a standoff ensues between him and Raymond. When Raymond's young daughter enters the room, Matthew returns to civility, lowering his weapon. Raymond agrees to help Matthew, and soon afterwards Joe is loaded into an ambulance. Society returns to normal once the power returns, though Annie, Matthew and their neighbors are somewhat changed by their experience.

== Cast ==
- Kyle MacLachlan as Matthew
- Elisabeth Shue as Annie
- Dermot Mulroney as Joe
- Richard T. Jones as Raymond
- Bill Smitrovich as Steph, Matthew and Annie's neighbor
- Philip Bruns as Mr. Schaefer, Matthew and Annie's neighbor
- Michael Rooker as Gary
- Jack Noseworthy as Prowler
- Richard Schiff as Gun Shop Clerk

== Production ==
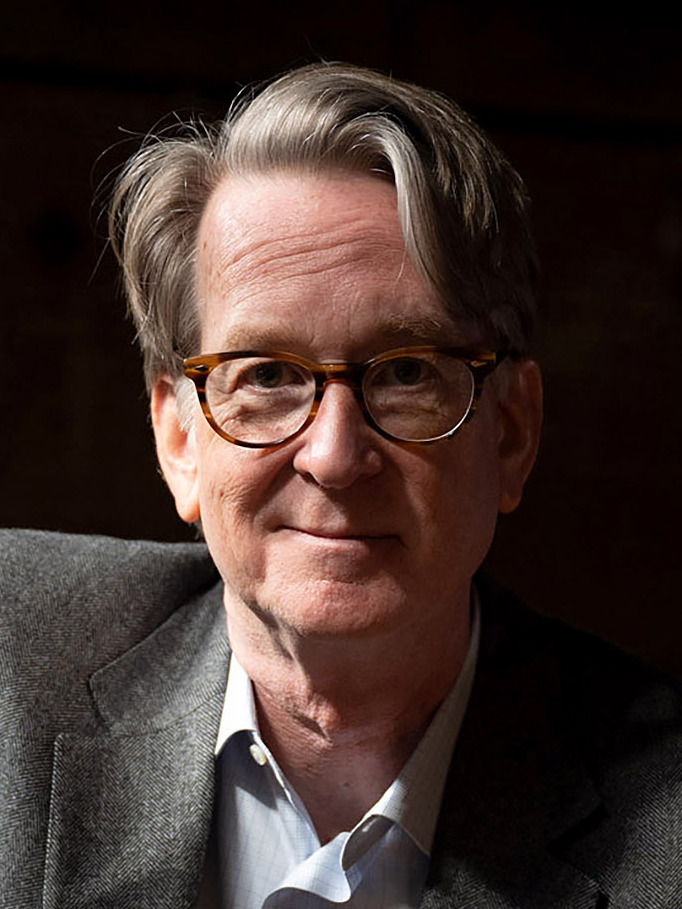
The film was the feature-length directorial debut of screenwriter David Koepp.

The Trigger Effect was written and directed by David Koepp, who previously worked as a screenwriter on Brian De Palma's Mission: Impossible and Carlito's Way, and Steven Spielberg's Jurassic Park. The film was inspired by the 1978 documentary television series Connections and the 1960 The Twilight Zone episode "The Monsters Are Due on Maple Street", which starred Koepp's uncle, actor Claude Akins. Koepp noted the similarities between them, stating that "When technological advances go out, the veneer of civilization is removed also, and they're capable of inappropriate behavior." It took him 12 drafts to fine-tune the script. The film was produced by Amblin Entertainment for US$8 million, a cost that was considered high for an independent film and low for a studio film. According to Koepp, getting the necessary amount of money to make the film was challenging and involved a lot of talking and pleading.

Principal photography took place from July 31 to September 22, 1995. Most of the film was shot in Los Angeles, California, where Koepp was based at the time. The nuclear power plant that can be seen in the distant landscape when the protagonists are on a highway near the end of the film is the Rancho Seco Nuclear Generating Station. As his directorial debut, The Trigger Effect was a new experience for Koepp, who remarked: "There's less imput [sic], coming from one brain. Making all those decisions by yourself can be a drag, you end up having long shouting matches with yourself." Actor Kyle MacLachlan, who played Matthew, originally wanted to play Joe because he wanted to avoid a "juvenile lead", a role with which he strongly identified. Nevertheless, he liked the script from the beginning and felt that playing a "real guy" with real emotions was "fun" for him, especially after playing unconventional roles in Twin Peaks and Showgirls.

== Themes ==
The Trigger Effect invokes the idea that one simple event can potentially lead to social, racial and sexual issues, implying that humans cannot live peacefully together. The film opens with a scene where two coyotes follow their animal instincts and eat fresh meat, as if humans were not animals themselves. MacLachlan said that the film shows "how quickly humanity would fall back into almost a tribal existence" after a simple power outage, while actor Dermot Mulroney noted that the film addresses inexplicable yet realistic behaviors between characters, such as mistrust between black and white people, and issues regarding levels of education or personal achievement. Similarly, SplicedWire editor Rob Blackwelder interpreted it as "a commentary on the underlying sense of danger and lack of trust that permeates American society." Resentment is another theme that is explored, as reflected in the scene where Matthew tells Joe it is more natural for him to buy a shotgun. The character played by actress Elisabeth Shue, Annie, switches feelings for Matthew on and off. This, according to Shue, shows that a married woman with a comfortable life has as many desires, needs and pain, as a homeless person.

== Release ==
The Trigger Effect premiered at the Seattle International Film Festival on May 16, 1996. It then had a limited theatrical release on August 30, 1996 in 524 theaters, finishing 12th and grossing $1.9 million at the U.S. box office weekend. The film's performance was considered a fair result for a limited release, and was compared to that of the comedy The Stupids, which had a wide release in the same weekend. Overall, the film went on to make $3.6 million in North America. A novelization, authored by Dewey Gram, was released in September 1996 by Berkley Books. The Trigger Effect was released on VHS in January 1997, on DVD in July 1999, and on Blu-ray in June 2019.

=== Critical reception ===
Upon release, The Trigger Effect received mixed reviews from critics. Writing for Entertainment Weekly, film critic Lisa Schwarzbaum described The Trigger Effect as "a sturdy and efficient thriller", while Marc Savlov, writing for The Austin Chronicle, highlighted Koepp's ability to gradually increase the tension as the film progresses. The cast was generally praised, particularly Shue, who Schwarzbaum singled out for retaining some of her "effective Leaving Las Vegas disoriented languidness." Even so, film critic Richard von Busack felt that the film's characters "never really engage the viewer" despite their proficient performances.

The ending was criticized for being safe and predictable, especially when compared to the riskier narrative prior to it. In his review for New York magazine, David Denby praised the first half of the film, stating that Koepp shows both a Hitchcockian style, where tension is built through silences of routine domestic scenes, and elements of his collaboration with Spielberg. According to Denby, "the slightly bluish light scheme (the glam-fluorescent) and the images of suburban peace are reminiscent of Spielberg's mood of surreal wonder. This suburb, however, is just barely holding on to civilization." Nevertheless, he felt that the second half of the film "shifts into a predictable suburban-love-triangle potboiler" and that the ending was "as abrupt and thin as a TV show."

Some journalists criticized the film for the vagueness of its writing. In his review for Metro, von Busack explained that, although the film offers some hints about Annie's past, the character is not fully developed, and felt that Matthew's relationship with Joe is not very clear. Richard Harrington, writing for The Washington Post, criticized the fact that the film does not explain what caused the power outage and that the characters seem unimpressed about it. This vagueness was highlighted by Variety editor Ken Eisner, who acknowledged that Koepp's "cool lensing, tight cutting and minimal use of music support this conceptual, if head-scratching approach", describing The Trigger Effect as "a bleak, highly stylized view of modern civilization." Janet Maslin of The New York Times agreed, stating that the film's enveloping style "is haunting in its own powerful way."

On Rotten Tomatoes, the film holds a rating of 72% from 25 reviews with the consensus: "The Trigger Effect offers a captivating tale of paranoia and societal collapse, even if it runs out of thrills early on."
