= Laurie MacDonald =

American film producer (born 1953)

- Born: December 19, 1953 (age 72)
- Occupation: Film producer
- Years active: 1994–present
- Spouse: Walter F. Parkes

Laurie MacDonald (born December 19, 1953) is an American film producer. She is married to Walter F. Parkes. MacDonald and Parkes helped build the original DreamWorks SKG, where Parkes served as the head of its motion picture division. After their time at DreamWorks, they founded their own production company, Parkes + MacDonald.

== Filmography ==
=== Film ===
Producer

- Men in Black (1997)
- Men in Black II (2002)
- The Ring (2002)
- The Terminal (2004)
- Lemony Snicket's A Series of Unfortunate Events (2004)
- The Ring Two (2005)
- Just like Heaven (2005)
- The Legend of Zorro (2005)
- Sweeney Todd: The Demon Barber of Fleet Street (2007)
- The Burning Plain (2008)
- The Uninvited (2009)
- Dinner for Schmucks (2010)
- Men in Black 3 (2012)
- Flight (2012)
- Keeping Up with the Joneses (2016)
- Rings (2017)
- Men in Black: International (2019)
- The Good Spy (TBA)

Executive producer

- How to Make an American Quilt (1995)
- Twister (1996)
- The Trigger Effect (1996)
- The Peacemaker (1997)
- Amistad (1997)
- The Mask of Zorro (1998)
- Gladiator (2000)
- The Time Machine (2002)
- The Tuxedo (2002)
- Catch Me If You Can (2002)
- The Island (2005)
- The Lookout (2007)
- The Kite Runner (2007)
- Tulip Fever (2017)
- The Trial of the Chicago 7 (2020)
- Gladiator II (2024)

=== Television ===
Executive producer

- Birdland (1994)
- Men in Black: The Series (1997–2001)
- Crossbones (2014)
- The Slap (2015)
- Warrior (2015) (TV pilot)
