= Marvel Epic Collection =

Marvel Comics paperbacks that reprint entire runs

An advertisement for Marvel's Epic Collection

The Marvel Epic Collection is an ongoing line of color trade paperbacks that republish Marvel comics in a uniform trade dress. Announced in April 2013, their stated intention was to collect entire runs of characters or titles as "big fat collections with the best price we can maintain", in similar manner to the discontinued black-and-white Essential Marvel.

The series is published out of order, though with a completists goal. Marvel's Senior Vice President of Sales David Gabriel said: "When all is said and done, the Epic volumes will fit seamlessly next to one another on readers' bookshelves, presenting a complete and unbroken run of each title."

The original announcement consisted of six titles at the pace of one volume a month, with Gabriel adding: "Marvel's most storied titles – including Amazing Spider-Man, Avengers, Captain America, Fantastic Four, Iron Man and Thor – are going Epic."

The first book, The Enemy Within, Iron Man's 10th numbered volume, was released in September 2013. It sold an estimated 864 copies in the first month, reaching no. 129 in the top-300 graphic novel chart.

Initial sales were steady, with October's release – Thor's 16th volume, War of the Pantheons – charting at 127 and selling 986 copies in the month of release. November's Amazing Spider-Man vol. 20: Cosmic Adventures reached no. 103, with 1,010 sales. The Avengers Epic vol. 9: Final Threat in December sold 943, with a chart position of 135.

The first Epic Collection to crack the top-100 was the 10th overall release. Amazing Spider-Man vol. 15: Ghosts of the Past, in May 2014, sold 1,152 copies, reaching no. 81 (51 for dollar rank).

The series now has more than 50 lines, including licensed books, such Alien, Star Wars, Micronauts and ROM – Spaceknight.

The rate of publication has increased significantly since launch, with 19 Epic Collections released in 2014, the first full year of print. There were 45 in 2019, and 89 in 2024, including reprints. With the escalated rate, two sub-imprints launched in 2023 and 2025 respectively. The Modern Era Epic Collection covers more recent comic runs, and the Ultimate Epic Collection is for the 2000s Ultimate Universe.

DC Comics launched a similar line – DC Finest – in 2024, which it described as "affordably priced, large-size paperback collections" providing "a new line of comprehensive collections of the most in-demand periods, genres, and characters from across DC history".

== Epic Collections ==
The core books of the Epic Collection largely span Marvel's silver and bronze age of comic books. With a few exceptions, this roughly covers a period from the release of Fantastic Four #1 in 1961 until around 1998 and the launch of Marvel Knights.

=== Aliens ===
In July 2020, Marvel Comics gained the rights to publish Alien and Predator in the wake of Fox's sale to Disney. Since 2023, the company has been republishing comics originally produced by Dark Horse Comics as part of the Epic Collection.

Spine lettering: White
#	Subtitle	Years covered	Issues collected	Writers	Artists	Pages	Released	ISBN
1	The Original Years	1988-1990	Aliens (vol. 1) #1-6; Aliens (vol. 2) #1-4; Aliens: Earth War #1-4; material from Dark Horse Presents #24, 42–43	Mark Verheiden	Mark Nelson	448	Mar 14, 2023	Aliens (vol. 2) #1 cover: 978-1302950682
2	The Original Years	1990-1992	Aliens: Genocide #1-4; Aliens: Hive #1-4; Aliens: Tribes; Aliens: Newt's Tale #1-2; material from Dark Horse Insider #14-27; Dark Horse Presents 5th Anniversary Special #1; Dark Horse Presents #56	Mike Richardson	Damon Willis	456	Aug 20, 2024	Aliens: Genocide #2 cover: 978-1302956318
3	The Original Years	1992-1994	Aliens 3 #1-3; Aliens: Space Marines #1-12; Aliens: Rogue #1-4; Aliens: Labyrinth #1-4; material from Dark Horse Comics #3-5, #11-13; Previews (1993) #1-12; Previews (1994) #1; Aliens Magazine #9-12	Steven Grant, Jim Woodring, Ian Edginton	Christopher Taylor, Kilian Plunkett, Will Simpson	472	Nov 18, 2025	Aliens: Labyrinth #4 cover: 978-1302965167
4	The Original Years	1992-1993	Aliens: Colonial Marines #1-10; Aliens Salvation; material from Aliens Magazine #13-20; Dark Horse Comics #15-19	Chris Warner, Kelley Puckett, Paul Guinan, Dan Jolley	Tony Akins, Allen Nunis, John Nadeau	472	Oct 27, 2026	Aliens: Colonial Marines #1 cover: 978-1302969448
5	The Original Years	1994-1997	Aliens: Music of the Spears #1-4; Aliens: Stronghold #1-4; Aliens: Berserker #1-4; Aliens: Mondo Heat #1; Aliens: Lovesick #1; Aliens: Pig #1; and material from Dark Horse Comics #22-24, Dark Horse Presents #101-102, and A Decade of Dark Horse #3	Chet Williamson, John Arcudi, John Wagner, Henry Gilroy, Chuck Dixon	Tim Hamilton, Doug Mahnke, Paul Mendoza, Ronnie del Carmen, Richard Forgues, Henry Flint	464	May 25, 2027	A Decade of Dark Horse #3 cover: 978-1302971830

=== Amazing Spider-Man ===
The Peter Parker version of Spider-Man first appeared in 1962's Amazing Fantasy #15, before the character's ongoing series, Amazing Spider-Man, launched with a cover date of March 1963.

Notable storylines include: The Death of Gwen Stacy in Vol. 7: The Goblin's Last Stand; Kraven's Last Hunt in Vol. 17; Spider-Man No More! in Vol. 3; and Venom in Vol. 18.

- See also: Spider-Man collected editions

Spine lettering: Red
#	Subtitle	Years covered	Issues collected	Writers	Artists	Pages	Released	ISBN
1	Great Power	1962-1964	Amazing Fantasy #15; Amazing Spider-Man #1–17, Annual #1	Stan Lee	Steve Ditko	504	Sep 24, 2014	Amazing Spider-Man Annual #1 cover: 978-0785188346
1	Great Power	1962-1964	Amazing Fantasy #15; Amazing Spider-Man #1–17, Annual #1	Stan Lee	Steve Ditko	504	Apr 8, 2020	Amazing Spider-Man Annual #1 cover: 978-1302925642
1	Great Power	1962-1964	Amazing Fantasy #15; Amazing Spider-Man #1–17, Annual #1	Stan Lee	Steve Ditko	504	31 May 2022	Amazing Spider-Man Annual #1 cover: 978-1302946852
2	Great Responsibility	1964-1966	Amazing Spider-Man #18–38, Annual #2	Stan Lee, Steve Ditko	Steve Ditko	504	Dec 21, 2016	Amazing Spider-Man #19 cover: 978-0785195818
2	Great Responsibility	1964-1966	Amazing Spider-Man #18–38, Annual #2	Stan Lee, Steve Ditko	Steve Ditko	504	Nov 7, 2023	Amazing Spider-Man #19 cover: 978-1302950576
3	Spider-Man No More!	1966-1967	Amazing Spider-Man #39–52, Annual #3–4; material from Not Brand Echh #2	Stan Lee	John Romita Sr.	400	May 16, 2018	Amazing Spider-Man Annual #3 cover: 978-1302910235
3	Spider-Man No More!	1966-1967	Amazing Spider-Man #39–52, Annual #3–4; material from Not Brand Echh #2	Stan Lee	John Romita Sr.	400	Jan 4, 2022	Amazing Spider-Man Annual #3 cover: 978-1302932497
3	Spider-Man No More!	1966-1967	Amazing Spider-Man #39–52, Annual #3–4; material from Not Brand Echh #2	Stan Lee	John Romita Sr.	400	Aug 18, 2026	Amazing Spider-Man Annual #3 cover: 978-1302967857
4	The Goblin Lives	1967-1968	Amazing Spider-Man #53–67, Spectacular Spider-Man magazine #1–2, Marvel Super-Heroes #14; material from Not Brand Echh #6 & #11	Stan Lee	John Romita Sr.	496	Jun 19, 2019	Amazing Spider-Man #65 cover: 978-1302917807
4	The Goblin Lives	1967-1968	Amazing Spider-Man #53–67, Spectacular Spider-Man magazine #1–2, Marvel Super-Heroes #14; material from Not Brand Echh #6 & #11	Stan Lee	John Romita Sr.	496	Mar 7, 2023	Amazing Spider-Man #65 cover: 978-1302950392
5	The Secret of the Petrified Tablet	1968-1970	Amazing Spider-Man #68–85, Annual #5	Stan Lee	John Romita Sr., John Buscema	464	Feb 11, 2020	Amazing Spider-Man #68 cover: 978-1302921965
5	The Secret of the Petrified Tablet	1968-1970	Amazing Spider-Man #68–85, Annual #5	Stan Lee	John Romita Sr., John Buscema	464	Mar 5, 2024	Amazing Spider-Man #68 cover: 978-1302957810
6	The Death of Captain Stacy	1970-1972	Amazing Spider-Man #86–104	Stan Lee, Roy Thomas	John Romita Sr., Gil Kane	440	Oct 19, 2021	Amazing Spider-Man #95 cover: 978-1302929084
7	The Goblin's Last Stand	1972-1973	Amazing Spider-Man #105–123	Stan Lee, Gerry Conway	John Romita Sr., Gil Kane	432	May 3, 2017	Amazing Spider-Man #122 cover: 978-1302904074
7	The Goblin's Last Stand	1972-1973	Amazing Spider-Man #105–123	Stan Lee, Gerry Conway	John Romita Sr., Gil Kane	432	Jan 20, 2021	Amazing Spider-Man #122 cover: 978-1302928179
7	The Goblin's Last Stand	1972-1973	Amazing Spider-Man #105–123	Stan Lee, Gerry Conway	John Romita Sr., Gil Kane	432	Jun 16, 2026	Amazing Spider-Man #122 cover: 978-1302967796
8	Man-Wolf at Midnight	1973-1975	Amazing Spider-Man #124–142, Giant-Size Super-Heroes #1	Gerry Conway	Ross Andru	416	Jul 19, 2022	Amazing Spider-Man #130 cover: 978-1302933500
9	Spider-Man or Spider-Clone?	1975-1977	Amazing Spider-Man #143–164, Annual #10	Gerry Conway, Len Wein	Ross Andru	464	Jul 25, 2023	Amazing Spider-Man #144 cover: 978-1302948740
10	Big Apple Battleground	1977-1978	Amazing Spider-Man #165–185, Annual #11-12, Nova #12	Len Wein, Marv Wolfman	Ross Andru	520	May 28, 2024	Amazing Spider-Man #181 cover: 978-1302955267
11	Nine Lives Has the Black Cat	1978-1980	Amazing Spider-Man #186-206, Annual #13, Peter Parker, Spectacular Spider-Man Annual #1	Marv Wolfman	Keith Pollard, John Byrne	488	Feb 25, 2025	Amazing Spider-Man #200 cover: 978-1302960483
12	Spider-Man: Threat or Menace?	1980-1981	Amazing Spider-Man #207-223, Annual #14-15	Dennis O'Neil	John Romita Jr., Frank Miller	480	Jan 6, 2026	Amazing Spider-Man #217 cover: 978-1302960490
13	Nothing Can Stop the Juggernaut	1982-1983	Amazing Spider-Man #224-241, Annual #16	Roger Stern	John Romita Jr.	496	Jun 2, 2026	Amazing Spider-Man #230 cover: 978-1302967789
15	Ghosts of the Past	1984-1986	Amazing Spider-Man #259–272, Annual #18–19; Web of Spider-Man #1, 6	Tom DeFalco, Bob Layton, Louise Simonson, Peter David	Ron Frenz, Sal Buscema	472	May 21, 2014	Amazing Spider-Man #270 cover: 978-0785189169
15	Ghosts of the Past	1984-1986	Amazing Spider-Man #259–272, Annual #18–19; Web of Spider-Man #1, 6	Tom DeFalco, Bob Layton, Louise Simonson, Peter David	Ron Frenz, Sal Buscema	472	Jun 27, 2023	Amazing Spider-Man #270 cover: 978-1302950484
17	Kraven's Last Hunt	1986-1987	Amazing Spider-Man #289–294, Annual #20–21, Spider-Man versus Wolverine, Spectacular Spider-Man #131–132 and Web of Spider-Man #29–32	James Owsley, David Michelinie, J.M. DeMatteis	John Romita Jr, Mark Bright, Mike Zeck	496	Jun 14, 2017	Amazing Spider-Man #293 cover: 978-1302907051
17	Kraven's Last Hunt	1986-1987	Amazing Spider-Man #289–294, Annual #20–21, Spider-Man versus Wolverine, Spectacular Spider-Man #131–132 and Web of Spider-Man #29–32	James Owsley, David Michelinie, J.M. DeMatteis	John Romita Jr, Mark Bright, Mike Zeck	496	Jan 3, 2023	Amazing Spider-Man #293 cover: 978-1302950330
18	Venom	1987-1988	Amazing Spider-Man #295–310, Annual #22; Spectacular Spider-Man #133; Web of Spider-Man #33	Ann Nocenti, David Michelinie	Cynthia Martin, Alex Saviuk, Todd McFarlane, Mark Bagley	504	Aug 29, 2018	Amazing Spider-Man #300 cover: 978-1302911423
18	Venom	1987-1988	Amazing Spider-Man #295–310, Annual #22; Spectacular Spider-Man #133; Web of Spider-Man #33	Ann Nocenti, David Michelinie	Cynthia Martin, Alex Saviuk, Todd McFarlane, Mark Bagley	504	Apr 8, 2025	Amazing Spider-Man #300 cover: 978-1302963903
19	Assassin Nation	1989	Amazing Spider-Man #311–325, Annual #23; Marvel Graphic Novel No. 46 - The Amazing Spider-Man: Parallel Lives	David Michelinie, Gerry Conway	Todd McFarlane, Rob Liefeld, Erik Larsen, Alex Saviuk	480	May 15, 2019	Amazing Spider-Man #323 cover: 978-1302918118
19	Assassin Nation	1989	Amazing Spider-Man #311–325, Annual #23; Marvel Graphic Novel No. 46 - The Amazing Spider-Man: Parallel Lives	David Michelinie, Gerry Conway	Todd McFarlane, Rob Liefeld, Erik Larsen, Alex Saviuk	480	May 14, 2024	Amazing Spider-Man #323 cover: 978-1302957902
20	Cosmic Adventures	1989-1990	Amazing Spider-Man #326–333, Annual #24; Spectacular Spider-Man #158–160, Annual #10; Web of Spider-Man #59–61, Annual #6	David Michelinie, Gerry Conway	Erik Larsen, Sal Buscema, Alex Saviuk, Gil Kane	504	Nov 20, 2013	Spectacular Spider-Man #158 cover: 978-0785187899
20	Cosmic Adventures	1989-1990	Amazing Spider-Man #326–333, Annual #24; Spectacular Spider-Man #158–160, Annual #10; Web of Spider-Man #59–61, Annual #6	David Michelinie, Gerry Conway	Erik Larsen, Sal Buscema, Alex Saviuk, Gil Kane	504	Dec 4, 2019	Spectacular Spider-Man #158 cover: 978-1302924294
21	Return of the Sinister Six	1990-1991	Amazing Spider-Man #334–350; Marvel Graphic Novel No. 63 - Spider-Man: Spirits of the Earth	David Michelinie	Charles Vess, Erik Larsen, Mark Bagley	504	Feb 24, 2016	Amazing Spider-Man #338 cover: 978-0785196914
21	Return of the Sinister Six	1990-1991	Amazing Spider-Man #334–350; Marvel Graphic Novel No. 63 - Spider-Man: Spirits of the Earth	David Michelinie	Charles Vess, Erik Larsen, Mark Bagley	504	Jul 9, 2024	Amazing Spider-Man #338 cover: 978-1302957889
22	Round Robin	1991-1992	Amazing Spider-Man #351–360, Annual #25; Spectacular Spider-Man Annual #11; Web of Spider-Man Annual #7; Marvel Graphic Novel No. 72 - Spider-Man: Fear Itself	David Michelinie, Al Milgrom	Mark Bagley, Chris Marrinan, Guang Yap, Ross Andru	488	Mar 31, 2015	Amazing Spider-Man Annual #25 cover: 978-0785192688
22	Round Robin	1991-1992	Amazing Spider-Man #351–360, Annual #25; Spectacular Spider-Man Annual #11; Web of Spider-Man Annual #7; Marvel Graphic Novel No. 72 - Spider-Man: Fear Itself	David Michelinie, Al Milgrom	Mark Bagley, Chris Marrinan, Guang Yap, Ross Andru	488	Sep 19, 2023	Amazing Spider-Man Annual #25 cover: 978-1302950545
23	The Hero Killers	1992	Amazing Spider-Man #361-367, Annual #26; Amazing Spider-Man: Soul of the Hunter; material from Spectacular Spider-Man Annual #12; Web of Spider-Man Annual #8; New Warriors Annual #2	David Michelinie, J.M. DeMatteis	Mark Bagley, Scott McDaniel, Mike Zeck	480	Jan 17, 2023	New Warriors Annual #2 cover: 978-1302951047
24	Invasion of the Spider-Slayers	1992-1993	Amazing Spider-Man #368–377, Annual #27; Spider-Man/Dr. Strange: The Way to Dusty Death; Spider-Man Special Edition: The Trial of Venom	Roy Thomas, David Michelinie	Mike Bair, Mark Bagley, Jeff Johnson	424	Jan 3, 2023	Amazing Spider-Man #373 cover: 978-1302948320
25	Maximum Carnage	1993	Amazing Spider-Man #378–380, Spectacular Spider-Man #201–203, Web of Spider-Man #101–103, Spider-Man #35–37, Spider-Man/ Punisher/ Sabretooth: Designer Genes; material from Spider-Man Unlimited #1–2	Terry Kavanagh, David Michelinie, J.M. DeMatteis, Tom DeFalco	Alex Saviuk, Mark Bagley, Tom Lyle, Sal Buscema, Ron Lim	432	Jan 28, 2020	Spider-Man Unlimited #1 cover: 978-1302921903
25	Maximum Carnage	1993	Amazing Spider-Man #378–380, Spectacular Spider-Man #201–203, Web of Spider-Man #101–103, Spider-Man #35–37, Spider-Man/ Punisher/ Sabretooth: Designer Genes; material from Spider-Man Unlimited #1–2	Terry Kavanagh, David Michelinie, J.M. DeMatteis, Tom DeFalco	Alex Saviuk, Mark Bagley, Tom Lyle, Sal Buscema, Ron Lim	432	May 23, 2023	Spider-Man Unlimited #1 cover: 978-1302950460
26	Lifetheft	1993-1994	Amazing Spider-Man #381–393, Annual #28; Spectacular Spider-Man #211; Web of Spider-Man #112; Spider-Man #45; Amazing Spider-Man: Ashcan Edition #1	David Michelinie, J.M. DeMatteis	Mark Bagley, Steven Butler	496	Nov 16, 2021	Amazing Spider-Man: Ashcan Edition cover: 978-1302930691
27	The Clone Saga	1994	Amazing Spider-Man #394-396; Spectacular Spider-Man #217-219; Web of Spider-Man #117-119; Spider-Man #51-53; Spider-Man Unlimited #7	Terry Kavanagh, J.M. DeMatteis, Howard Mackie, Tom DeFalco	Tom Lyle, Steven Butler, Mark Bagley, Sal Buscema, Liam Sharp	456	Jan 16, 2024	Web of Spider-Man #118 cover: 978-1302953669
28	Web of Life, Web of Death	1995	Amazing Spider-Man #397-399; Spectacular Spider-Man #220-222; Web of Spider-Man #120-123; Spider-Man #54-56; Spider-Man Unlimited #8; Spider-Man: Funeral For An Octopus #1-3; Spider-Man: The Clone Journal	Howard Mackie, J.M. DeMatteis, Tom DeFalco	Tom Lyle, Steven Butler, Mark Bagley, Sal Buscema	472	Nov 5, 2024	Web of Spider-Man #122 cover: 978-1302960087
29	The Mark of Kaine	1995	Amazing Spider-Man #400-403; Spectacular Spider-Man #223-226; Web of Spider-Man #124-126; Spider-Man #57-60; Spider-Man Unlimited #9	Howard Mackie, J.M. DeMatteis, Tom DeFalco, Stan Lee, Tom Lyle	John Romita Jr., Mark Bagley, Sal Buscema, Bill Sienkiewicz, Tom Lyle	496	Dec 8, 2026	Spider-Man #58 cover: 978-1302970055
30	Maximum Clonage	1995	Amazing Spider-Man #404; Web of Spider-Man # 127; Spider-Man #61; Spectacular Spider Man #227; Spider-Man: The Jackal Files #1; Spider-Man: Maximum Clonage Alpha #1; Spider-Man: Maximum Clonage Omega #1; New Warriors 61-62; material from Amazing Spider-Man Super Special #1; Spider-Man Super Special #1; Venom Super Special #1; Spectacular Spider-Man Super Special #1; Web of Spider-Man Super Special #1	Todd DeZago, J.M. DeMatteis, Howard Mackie, Tom DeFalco, David Michelinie, Evan Skolnick	Steven Butler, Mark Bagley, Tom Lyle, Eliot Brown, Ron Lim, Sal Buscema, Patch Zircher, Dave Hoover, Joe St. Pierre, Kyle Hotz, Darick Robertson, Steve Lightle	480	Feb 9, 2027	Amazing Spider-Man #404 cover: 978-1302971847
Jump to: Amazing Spider-Man Modern Era Epic Collection
Jump to: Spider-Man/Deadpool Modern Era Epic Collection

=== Ant-Man/Giant-Man ===
The character Hank Pym first appeared in Tales to Astonish #27, from 1962. In the first Epic Collection, his debut as both Ant Man (Tales to Astonish #35) and Giant Man (Tales to Astonish #49) is covered, plus the introduction of Janet van Dyne/Wasp (Tales to Astonish #44).

Spine lettering: Red
#	Subtitle	Years covered	Issues collected	Writers	Artists	Pages	Released	ISBN
1	The Man in the Ant Hill	1962-1964	Tales to Astonish #27, 35–59	Stan Lee, Larry Lieber	Jack Kirby, Don Heck, Dick Ayers	448	Jun 24, 2015	Tales To Astonish #44 cover: 978-0785198505
1	The Man in the Ant Hill	1962-1964	Tales to Astonish #27, 35–59	Stan Lee, Larry Lieber	Jack Kirby, Don Heck, Dick Ayers	448	Feb 1, 2023	Tales To Astonish #44 cover: 978-1302950354
2	Ant-Man No More	1964-1979	Tales to Astonish #60–69, Marvel Feature #4-10, Power Man #24-25, Black Goliath #1-5, The Champions #11-13, Marvel Premiere #47-48; material from Iron Man #44	Stan Lee, Mike Friedrich, Chris Claremont, Bill Mantlo	Herb Trimpe, Philip Russell, George Tuska, John Byrne	504	Jan 24, 2023	Marvel Premiere #47 cover: 978-1302949655

=== Avengers ===
The first Avengers line-up consisted of Iron Man, Ant Man, Wasp, Hulk, and Thor. They were soon joined by Silver Age Captain America in issue #4, which is collected in Volume 1: Earth's Mightiest Heroes.

With a revolving cast of characters, major storylines include The Kree-Skrull War (Volume 5: This Beachhead Earth); Under Siege (Volume 16); and The Korvac Saga (Volume 10: The Yesterday Quest)

Spine lettering: Green
#	Subtitle	Years covered	Issues collected	Writers	Artists	Pages	Released	ISBN
1	Earth's Mightiest Heroes	1963-1965	Avengers #1–20	Stan Lee	Jack Kirby, Don Heck	456	Nov 12, 2014	Avengers #3 cover: 978-0785188643
1	Earth's Mightiest Heroes	1963-1965	Avengers #1–20	Stan Lee	Jack Kirby, Don Heck	456	May 28, 2024	Avengers #3 cover: 978-1302957988
2	Once an Avenger...	1965-1967	Avengers #21–40	Stan Lee, Roy Thomas	Don Heck	440	Nov 16, 2016	Avengers #28 cover: 978-0785195825
3	The Masters of Evil	1967-1968	Avengers #41–56, Annual #1–2; X-Men #45; material from Not Brand Echh #5 & #8	Roy Thomas	John Buscema	496	Apr 26, 2017	Avengers #51 cover: 978-1302904104
4	Behold... The Vision	1968-1970	Avengers #57–76; Marvel Super Heroes #17	Roy Thomas	John Buscema, Sal Buscema, Gene Colan	456	Apr 29, 2015	Avengers #58 cover: 978-0785191650
5	This Beachhead Earth	1970-1972	Avengers #77–97; Incredible Hulk (vol. 2) #140	Roy Thomas	John Buscema, Sal Buscema, Neal Adams	504	Jul 29, 2020	Avengers #87 cover: 978-1302921972
5	This Beachhead Earth	1970-1972	Avengers #77–97; Incredible Hulk (vol. 2) #140	Roy Thomas	John Buscema, Sal Buscema, Neal Adams	504	Aug 22, 2023	Avengers #87 cover: 978-1302950521
6	A Traitor Stalks Among Us	1972-1973	Avengers #98–114; Daredevil #99	Roy Thomas, Steve Englehart	Barry Windsor-Smith, Rich Buckler, Don Heck	400	Jun 1, 2021	Avengers #114 cover: 978-1302929114
7	The Avengers/ Defenders War	1973-1974	Avengers #115–128; Giant-Size Avengers #1; Defenders #9–11; Captain Marvel #33; Fantastic Four #150; material from Defenders #8	Steve Englehart	Bob Brown, Sal Buscema	456	Apr 11, 2018	Avengers #119 cover: 978-1302910006
7	The Avengers/ Defenders War	1973-1974	Avengers #115–128; Giant-Size Avengers #1; Defenders #9–11; Captain Marvel #33; Fantastic Four #150; material from Defenders #8	Steve Englehart	Bob Brown, Sal Buscema	456	Apr 12, 2022	Avengers #119 cover: 978-1302934026
8	Kang War	1974-1976	Avengers #129-149, Giant-Size Avengers #2-4	Steve Englehart	Sal Buscema, Dave Cockrum, George Tuska, Don Heck, George Perez	504	Jul 19, 2022	Giant-Size Avengers #2 cover: 978-1302933524
9	The Final Threat	1976-1977	Avengers #150–166, Annual #6–7; Super-Villain Team-Up #9; Marvel Two-in-One Annual #2	Jim Shooter, Gerry Conway	George Perez, Jim Starlin, John Byrne	440	Dec 11, 2013	Avengers #150 cover: 978-0785187905
9	The Final Threat	1976-1977	Avengers #150–166, Annual #6–7; Super-Villain Team-Up #9; Marvel Two-in-One Annual #2	Jim Shooter, Gerry Conway	George Perez, Jim Starlin, John Byrne	440	May 26, 2021	Avengers #150 cover: 978-1302929596
10	The Yesterday Quest	1978-1979	Avengers #167–188, Annual #8–9; material from Marvel Tales #100	Jim Shooter, David Michelinie	George Perez, John Byrne, David Wenzel	496	Sep 26, 2023	Avengers #167 cover: 978-1302948764
11	The Evil Reborn	1979-1981	Avengers #189–209, Annual #10; Marvel Premiere #55; material from Tales to Astonish #12	David Michelinie	George Perez, John Byrne, Gene Colan	528	May 21, 2024	Avengers #200 cover: 978-1302955236
12	Court-Martial	1981-1982	Avengers #210-226, Annual #11, and Vision and the Scarlet Witch (1982) #1-4	Jim Shooter, Bill Mantlo	Bob Hall, Greg LaRocque, Rick Leonardi	528	May 6, 2025	Avengers #223 cover: 978-1302960506
13	Seasons of the Witch	1982-1983	Avengers #227-237, Annual #12; Amazing Spider-Man Annual #16; Fantastic Four #256; Doctor Strange #60; Hawkeye #1-4	Roger Stern, Mark Gruenwald	Al Milgrom, John Byrne	496	Nov 12, 2024	Avengers Annual #12 cover: 978-1302960094
14	Absolute Vision	1983-1985	Avengers #238-254, Annual #13	Roger Stern	Al Milgrom, Bob Hall	464	Mar 31, 2026	Avengers #249 cover: 9781302967956
16	Under Siege	1986-1987	Avengers #264–277, Annual #15; West Coast Avengers Annual #1; Alpha Flight #39	Roger Stern, Danny Fingeroth, Steve Englehart	John Buscema, Steve Ditko, Mark Bright	456	May 31, 2016	Avengers #276 cover: 978-0785195399
16	Under Siege	1986-1987	Avengers #264–277, Annual #15; West Coast Avengers Annual #1; Alpha Flight #39	Roger Stern, Danny Fingeroth, Steve Englehart	John Buscema, Steve Ditko, Mark Bright	456	Jan 27, 2026	Avengers #276 cover: 978-1302967642
17	Judgment Day	1987	Avengers #278–285, Annual #16; Marvel Graphic Novel No. 27 - Emperor Doom; X-Men vs. Avengers #1–4; West Coast Avengers Annual #2	Roger Stern, Bob Harras, Tom DeFalco, David Michelinie, Steve Englehart	Bob Hall, John Buscema, Marc Silvestri, Keith Pollard, Al Milgrom	464	Jun 18, 2014	Marvel Graphic Novel: Emperor Doom cover: 978-0785188940
17	Judgment Day	1987	Avengers #278–285, Annual #16; Marvel Graphic Novel No. 27 - Emperor Doom; X-Men vs. Avengers #1–4; West Coast Avengers Annual #2	Roger Stern, Bob Harras, Tom DeFalco, David Michelinie, Steve Englehart	Bob Hall, John Buscema, Marc Silvestri, Keith Pollard, Al Milgrom	464	Jan 4, 2022	Marvel Graphic Novel: Emperor Doom cover: 978-1302933661
18	Heavy Metal	1987-1989	Avengers #286-303, Annual #17	Walt Simonson, Ralph Macchio	John Buscema	512	Nov 24, 2020	Avengers #294 cover: 978-1302923150
19	Acts of Vengeance	1989-1990	Avengers #304-318, Annual #18, Avengers West Coast #53-55	John Byrne, Michael Higgins, Fabian Nicieza	Paul Ryan, Ron Wilson	496	Mar 28, 2023	Avengers #305 cover: 978-1302951108
20	The Crossing Line	1990-1991	Avengers #319-333, Annual #19; material from Captain America Annual #9, Iron Man Annual #11, Thor Annual #15 and Avengers West Coast Annual #5	Fabian Nicieza, Larry Hama	Rik Levins, Paul Ryan, Herb Trimpe	520	Mar 1, 2022	Avengers #329 cover: 978-1302934446
21	The Collection Obsession	1991-1992	Avengers #334–344, Annual #20, Marvel Graphic Novel No. 68 - Avengers: Death Trap – The Vault; material from Incredible Hulk Annual #17, Namor the Sub-Mariner Annual #1, Iron Man Annual #12 and Avengers West Coast Annual #6	Danny Fingeroth, Roy Thomas, Bob Harras, Fabian Nicieza	Ron Lim, Steve Epting	496	Mar 14, 2018	Avengers #339 cover: 978-1302910013
21	The Collection Obsession	1991-1992	Avengers #334–344, Annual #20, Marvel Graphic Novel No. 68 - Avengers: Death Trap – The Vault; material from Incredible Hulk Annual #17, Namor the Sub-Mariner Annual #1, Iron Man Annual #12 and Avengers West Coast Annual #6	Danny Fingeroth, Roy Thomas, Bob Harras, Fabian Nicieza	Ron Lim, Steve Epting	496	Sep 20, 2022	Avengers #339 cover: 978-1302946920
22	Operation: Galactic Storm	1992	Avengers #345–347, Avengers West Coast #80–82, Quasar #32–34, Wonder Man #7–9, Iron Man #278–279, Thor #445–446, Captain America #401; material from Captain America #398–400	Bob Harras, Mark Gruenwald	Steve Epting, Rik Levins, Dave Ross	488	Jul 26, 2017	Avengers #345 cover: 978-1302906894
22	Operation: Galactic Storm	1992	Avengers #345–347, Avengers West Coast #80–82, Quasar #32–34, Wonder Man #7–9, Iron Man #278–279, Thor #445–446, Captain America #401; material from Captain America #398–400	Bob Harras, Mark Gruenwald	Steve Epting, Rik Levins, Dave Ross	488	May 10, 2022	Avengers #345 cover: 978-1302946869
23	Fear the Reaper	1992-1993	Avengers #348–359, Annual #21; material from Captain America Annual #11, Thor Annual #17 and Fantastic Four Annual #25	Mark Gruenwald, Bob Harras, Len Kaminski	Herb Trimpe, Steve Epting, M.C. Wyman	480	Apr 10, 2019	Avengers #357 cover: 978-1302916169
24	The Gatherers Strike!	1993-1994	Avengers #360–366, Annual #22; Avengers: Strikefile; Avengers Anniversary Magazine; Avengers: The Terminatrix Objective #1–4	Bob Harras, Glenn Herdling, Mark Gruenwald	Steve Epting, Gordon Purcell, Mike Gustovich	480	Dec 11, 2019	Avengers #362 cover: 978-1302920630
25	The Gathering	1993-1994	Avengers #367-377, Annual #23; X-Men #26; Avengers West Coast #101; Uncanny X-Men #307; Avengers Log	Bob Harras, Roy Thomas, Glenn Herdling	Steve Epting, John Buscema	512	Aug 22, 2023	Avengers #373 cover: 978-1302953676
26	Taking A.I.M.	1994-1995	Avengers #378–388; Marvel Double Feature: Avengers/Giant-Man #379-382; Vision #1-4; Captain America #440–441	Bob Harras	George Perez, Mike Deodato Jr., Jeff Moore, Manny Clark	504	Nov 9, 2021	Avengers #388 cover: 978-1302932336
27	Timeslide	1995-1996	Avengers #389-402; Avengers: The Crossing; Avengers: Timeslide; Onslaught: Marvel Universe	Bob Harras, Terry Kavanagh, Mark Waid, Ben Raab	Mike Deodato Jr	528	Dec 16, 2025	Avengers #402 cover: 978-1302967017
28	Heroes Reborn	1996-1997	Avengers (vol. 2) #1-12; Iron Man (vol. 2) #6, #12; Fantastic Four (vol. 2) #6 (B Story), #12; Captain America #6 (B Story), #12	Rob Liefeld, Jim Valentino, Jeph Loeb, Walter Simonson, Scott Lobdell, Jim Lee & Brandon Choi	Chap Yaep, Rob Liefeld, Ian Churchill, Michael Ryan, Ed Benes, Ron Lim, Brett Booth, Joe Bennett	496	Mar 30, 2027	Heroes Reborn #1 cover: 978-1302972127
Jump to: New Avengers Modern Era Epic Collection

=== Avengers West Coast ===
Even though the Epic Collections are titled Avengers West Coast, the comic was published as The West Coast Avengers up until issue #46.

Volume 7: Ultron Unbound contains the first appearance of James Rhodes as War Machine, as well as the origin story for the Julia Carpenter version of Spider-Woman.

Meanwhile, Scarlet Witch showed her initial slip into madness in #56, reproduced in Vol. 5: Darker Than Scarlet. This eventually led to the events of "House Of M" and the "No More Mutants" Marvel age.

Spine lettering: Green
#	Subtitle	Years covered	Issues collected	Writers	Artists	Pages	Released	ISBN
1	How the West Was Won	1984-1986	West Coast Avengers (vol. 1) #1–4; Iron Man Annual #7; Avengers #250; West Coast Avengers (vol. 2) #1–7; The Vision and the Scarlet Witch #1–2; Wonder Man #1	Roger Stern, Steve Englehart	Bob Hall, Al Milgrom, Richard Howell	496	Sep 26, 2018	West Coast Avengers #1 cover: 978-1302914233
1	How the West Was Won	1984-1986	West Coast Avengers (vol. 1) #1–4; Iron Man Annual #7; Avengers #250; West Coast Avengers (vol. 2) #1–7; The Vision and the Scarlet Witch #1–2; Wonder Man #1	Roger Stern, Steve Englehart	Bob Hall, Al Milgrom, Richard Howell	496	Jan 19, 2021	West Coast Avengers #1 cover: 978-1302928193
2	Lost in Space-Time	1986-1987	West Coast Avengers (vol. 2) #8–24, Annual #1; Avengers Annual #15	Steve Englehart, Danny Fingeroth	Al Milgrom, Steve Ditko, Mark Bright	488	Sep 18, 2019	West Coast Avengers (vol. 2) #21 cover: 978-1302919719
2	Lost in Space-Time	1986-1987	West Coast Avengers (vol. 2) #8–24, Annual #1; Avengers Annual #15	Steve Englehart, Danny Fingeroth	Al Milgrom, Steve Ditko, Mark Bright	488	Nov 28, 2023	West Coast Avengers (vol. 2) #21 cover: 978-1302950583
3	Tales to Astonish	1987-1988	West Coast Avengers (vol. 2) #25-37, Annual #2; Avengers Annual #16, Marvel Graphic Novel No. 27: Emperor Doom	David Michelinie, Steve Englehart, Tom DeFalco	Bob Hall, Al Milgrom	456	Sep 23, 2020	West Coast Avengers Annual #2 cover: 978-1302923167
4	Vision Quest	1988-1989	West Coast Avengers (vol. 2) #38-46, Annual #3; Avengers West Coast #47-52, Annual #4; material from Avengers Spotlight #23	John Byrne, Steve Englehart	John Byrne, Al Milgrom	488	Dec 22, 2020	West Coast Avengers (vol. 2) #43 cover: 978-1302927424
4	Vision Quest	1988-1989	West Coast Avengers (vol. 2) #38-46, Annual #3; Avengers West Coast #47-52, Annual #4; material from Avengers Spotlight #23	John Byrne, Steve Englehart	John Byrne, Al Milgrom	488	Jul 29, 2025	West Coast Avengers (vol. 2) #43 cover: 978-1302963910
5	Darker Than Scarlet	1989-1990	Avengers West Coast #53-64, Annual #5; Avengers #311-313; material from Avengers Annual #19; What The..? #6	John Byrne, Roy Thomas, Dann Thomas	John Byrne, Paul Ryan, James Fry	456	Dec 21, 2021	Avengers West Coast #56 cover: 978-1302931988
6	California Screaming	1990-1992	Avengers West Coast #65-82, Annual #6	Roy Thomas, Dann Thomas	Paul Ryan, Dave Ross, Herb Trimpe	512	Apr 18, 2023	Avengers West Coast #68 cover: 978-1302951016
7	Ultron Unbound	1992-1993	Avengers West Coast #83-95, Annual #7-8; material from Darkhawk Annual #1; Iron Man Annual #13	Roy Thomas, Dann Thomas	Dave Ross, M.C. Wyman	488	Apr 23, 2024	Avengers West Coast Annual #7 cover: 978-1302956448
8	Terminated	1993-1994	Avengers West Coast 96–102; U.S.Agent #1-4; Spider-Woman #1-4; Scarlet Witch #1-4	Roy Thomas, Dann Thomas, Dan Abnett, Andy Lanning, Mark Gruenwald	Dave Ross, John Higgins, John Czop, Steve Ellis, M.C. Wyman	496	Dec 29, 2026	Avengers West Coast #102 cover: 978-1302969455

=== Black Panther ===
Volume 1 of the Black Panther Epic Collection has the character's first appearance in Fantastic Four #52-53. Between that and the rest of the volume, he joins The Avengers with issue #52, which is collected in The Avengers Epic Collection Volume 3: The Masters of Evil.

His origin story is in The Avengers #87 (The Avengers Epic Collection Volume 5: This Beachhead Earth), before departing the team after issue #126 (The Avengers Epic Collection Volume 7: The Avengers/ Defenders War).

After that, his story continues in the rest of Panther's Rage.

Spine lettering: Blue
#	Subtitle	Years covered	Issues collected	Writers	Artists	Pages	Released	ISBN
1	Panther's Rage	1966, 1973–1976	Fantastic Four #52–53; Jungle Action (vol. 2) #6–24	Don McGregor	Rich Buckler, Billy Graham	400	Sep 28, 2016	Jungle Action Vol. 2 #13 cover: 978-1302901905
2	Revenge of the Black Panther	1977-1988	Black Panther #1–15, Marvel Premiere #51–53, Black Panther (vol. 2) #1–4; material from Marvel Team-Up #100	Jack Kirby, Ed Hannigan, Peter Gillis	Jack Kirby, Jerry Bingham, Denys Cowan	456	Feb 20, 2019	Black Panther #4 cover: 978-1302915421
2	Revenge of the Black Panther	1977-1988	Black Panther #1–15, Marvel Premiere #51–53, Black Panther (vol. 2) #1–4; material from Marvel Team-Up #100	Jack Kirby, Ed Hannigan, Peter Gillis	Jack Kirby, Jerry Bingham, Denys Cowan	456	Mar 10, 2021	Black Panther #4 cover: 978-1302928209
3	Panther's Prey	1989-1994	Black Panther: Panther's Prey #1-4; material from Marvel Comics Presents #13-37, 148, Solo Avengers #19, Marvel Super Heroes #1, Marvel Fanfare #60 and Fantastic Four Unlimited #1	Don McGregor	Sandy Plunkett, Gene Colan, Dwayne Turner, Denys Cowan, Don Hillsman II	504	Mar 23, 2021	Marvel Fanfare #60 cover 978-1302921989

=== Black Widow ===
The debut of Natasha Romanova as the Black Widow is as an Iron Man villain in Tales Of Suspense #52. She is a reformed supporting character with The Avengers through the rest of Volume 1, and did not get her own individual series until 1999 - which is collected as a Modern Era Epic Collection Volume 1: The Itsy-Bitsy Spider.

Spine lettering: Blue
#	Subtitle	Years covered	Issues collected	Writers	Artists	Pages	Released	ISBN
1	Beware the Black Widow	1964-1971	Tales of Suspense #52-53, 57, 60, 64, Avengers #29-30, 36–37, 43–44, Amazing Spider-Man #86, Amazing Adventures #1-8, Daredevil #81; material from Avengers #16, 32–33, 38–39, 41–42, 45–47, 57, 63–64, 76	Stan Lee, Roy Thomas	Don Heck, John Buscema, Gene Colan	408	Feb 12, 2020	Black Widow Pinup cover 978-1302921262
2	The Coldest War	1981-1998	Marvel Graphic Novel No. 61 - Black Widow: The Coldest War, Marvel Graphic Novel No. 75 - Daredevil/Black Widow: Abattoir, and more: Fury/Black Widow: Death Duty, Journey Into Mystery #517-519; material from Bizarre Adventures #25, Marvel Fanfare #10-13, Solo Avengers #7, Marvel Comics Presents #135, Daredevil Annual #10	Ralph Macchio, Gerry Conway, Daniel Chichester	Jim Starlin, Cefn Ridout, George Perez, George Freeman, Larry Stroman, Joe Chiodo, Charlie Adlard	480	Oct 7, 2020	Marvel Fanfare #11 cover 978-1302921309
Jump to: Black Widow Modern Era Epic Collection

=== Blade ===
Blade first appeared as a side character in The Tomb of Dracula series, beginning in 1973. He largely disappeared from Marvel Comics between 1976 and 1992, when he reappeared in Ghost Rider.

Spine lettering: Maroon
#	Subtitle	Years covered	Issues collected	Writers	Artists	Pages	Released	ISBN
1	His Name Is... Blade	1973-1990	Tomb of Dracula #10, 12–14, 24, 30, 41–43, 45, 51, 53, 58; Fear #24; Marvel Preview #3; Doctor Strange #61-62, 67; material from Tomb of Dracula #17-19, 21, 44, 46–50, 52; Vampire Tales #8-9; Marvel Preview #8; Marvel Comics Presents #64	Marv Wolfman	Gene Colan	496	Oct 20, 2026	Tomb of Dracula #10 cover 978-1302960513
2	Nightstalkers	1991-1993	Tomb of Dracula (vol. 3) #1-4; Nightstalkers #1-6; Ghost Rider (vol. 3) #31; material from Midnight Sons Unlimited #1	Marv Wolfman, Daniel Chichester	Gene Colan, Ron Garney	432	Jan 14, 2025	Nightstalkers #1 Poster cover 978-1302956547

=== Captain America ===
The first comics appearance of Captain America was in Captain America Comics #1 from 1940, printed by Timely. Nothing from the character's appearances from that era which ran from Captain America Comics #1 (March 1941) through to Captain America #78 (September 1954) are collected. The Epic Collection begins with the character's Silver Age return, in Strange Tales #114, from 1963.

Notable storylines include Mark Gruenwald's Captain America No More, which stretches through Vol. 14: The Captain; Death of the Red Skull by J. M. DeMatteis in Vol. 11: Sturm und Drang; Operation: Rebirth by Mark Waid in Vol. 22: Man Without a Country; and The Strange Death of Captain America by Jim Steranko in Vol. 2: The Coming of... The Falcon.

Spine lettering: Blue
#	Subtitle	Years covered	Issues collected	Legacy	Writers	Artists	Pages	Released	ISBN
1	Captain America Lives Again	1963-1967	Strange Tales #114, Avengers #4, Tales of Suspense #58–96	#58-96	Stan Lee	Jack Kirby	488	Nov 26, 2014	Tales of Suspense #80 cover: 978-0785188360
1	Captain America Lives Again	1963-1967	Strange Tales #114, Avengers #4, Tales of Suspense #58–96	#58-96	Stan Lee	Jack Kirby	488	Mar 17, 2021	Tales of Suspense #80 cover: 978-1302928230
2	The Coming of... The Falcon	1968-1969	Tales of Suspense #97–99, Captain America #100–119; material from Not Brand Echh #3, 12	#97-119	Stan Lee, Jim Steranko	Jack Kirby, Jim Steranko, Gene Colan	496	Sep 21, 2016	Captain America #117 cover: 978-1302900076
3	Bucky Reborn	1969-1971	Captain America #120–138	#120-138	Stan Lee	Gene Colan	400	Jul 5, 2017	Captain America #126 cover: 978-1302904197
3	Bucky Reborn	1969-1971	Captain America #120–138	#120-138	Stan Lee	Gene Colan	400	May 14, 2024	Captain America #126 cover: 978-1302957858
4	Hero or Hoax?	1971-1973	Captain America #139–159	#139-159	Stan Lee, Gary Friedrich, Steve Englehart	John Romita Sr., Sal Buscema	472	Jul 11, 2018	Captain America #155 cover: 978-1302910037
4	Hero or Hoax?	1971-1973	Captain America #139–159	#139-159	Stan Lee, Gary Friedrich, Steve Englehart	John Romita Sr., Sal Buscema	472	Jul 27, 2022	Captain America #155 cover: 978-1302946821
5	The Secret Empire	1973-1974	Captain America #160-179	#160-179	Steve Englehart	Sal Buscema	416	Jun 27, 2023	Captain America #171 cover: 978-1302948733
6	The Man Who Sold the United States	1974-1976	Captain America #180-200; Marvel Treasury Special: Captain America's Bicentennial Battles	#180-200	Steve Englehart, Jack Kirby	Frank Robbins, Jack Kirby	512	Apr 16, 2024	Captain America #185 cover: 978-1302955205
7	The Swine	1976-1978	Captain America #201–221, Annual #3-4	#201-221	Jack Kirby, Donald Glut	Jack Kirby, Sal Buscema	448	Jul 1, 2025	Captain America #201 cover: 978-1302960520
8	The Lazarus Conspiracy	1978-1980	Captain America #222–246; Incredible Hulk #232; Marvel Premiere #49	#222-246	Roger McKenzie, Peter Gillis, Steve Gerber	Sal Buscema	496	Nov 3, 2026	Captain America #242 cover: 978-1302967901
9	Dawn's Early Light	1980-1982	Captain America #247–266, Annual #5	#247-266	Roger Stern, John Byrne, David Michelinie, J.M. DeMatteis, David Kraft	John Byrne, Gene Colan, Mike Zeck,	496	Feb 19, 2014	Captain America #249 cover: 978-0785188667
9	Dawn's Early Light	1980-1982	Captain America #247–266, Annual #5	#247-266	Roger Stern, John Byrne, David Michelinie, J.M. DeMatteis, David Kraft	John Byrne, Gene Colan, Mike Zeck,	496	Jul 21, 2021	Captain America #249 cover: 978-1302929602
10	Monsters and Men	1982-1983	Captain America #267–285, Annual #6; Defenders #106	#267-285	J.M. DeMatteis, David Kraft	Mike Zeck, Ron Wilson, Sal Buscema	504	Oct 14, 2020	Captain America #280 cover: 978-1302923235
11	Sturm und Drang	1983-1985	Captain America #286-301, Annual #7 and The Falcon #1-4	#286-301	J.M. DeMatteis, Jim Owsley	Mike Zeck, Mark Bright, Paul Neary	520	Aug 9, 2022	Captain America #299 cover: 978-1302945367
12	Society of Serpents	1985-1986	Captain America #302–317; material from Marvel Fanfare #18	#302-317	Michael Carlin, Mark Gruenwald, Roger Stern	Frank Miller, Paul Neary	432	Aug 20, 2014	Captain America #317 cover: 978-0785188964
13	Justice Is Served	1986-1987	Captain America #318–332, Annual #8, Amazing Spider-Man #278; material from Marvel Fanfare #29, 31–32	#318-332	Mark Gruenwald, J.M. DeMatteis	Paul Neary, Mike Zeck, Kerry Gammill, Tom Morgan	512	Apr 5, 2017	Captain America Annual #8 cover: 978-1302904203
14	The Captain	1987-1989	Captain America #333–350, Iron Man #228	#333-350	Mark Gruenwald, David Michelinie	Tom Morgan, Kieron Dwyer, Mark Bright	504	Jul 27, 2021	Captain America #350 cover: 978-1302930707
15	The Bloodstone Hunt	1989-1990	Captain America #351–371	#351-371	Mark Gruenwald	Kieron Dwyer, Al Milgrom, Mark Bright, Ron Lim	496	Apr 25, 2018	Captain America #351 cover: 978-1302910020
15	The Bloodstone Hunt	1989-1990	Captain America #351–371	#351-371	Mark Gruenwald	Kieron Dwyer, Al Milgrom, Mark Bright, Ron Lim	496	Mar 8, 2022	Captain America #351 cover: 978-1302933913
16	Streets of Poison	1990-1991	Captain America #372–386, Annual #9–10	#372-386	Mark Gruenwald, Daniel Chichester	Ron Lim, Mark Bagley, Jim Valentino, Mike Manley	512	Jun 17, 2015	Captain America #383 cover: 978-0785192657
16	Streets of Poison	1990-1991	Captain America #372–386, Annual #9–10	#372-386	Mark Gruenwald, Daniel Chichester	Ron Lim, Mark Bagley, Jim Valentino, Mike Manley	512	Nov 5, 2024	Captain America #383 cover: 978-1302960452
17	The Superia Stratagem	1991-1992	Captain America #387–397; Adventures of Captain America #1–4	#387-397	Mark Gruenwald, Fabian Nicieza	Rik Levins, Larry Alexander, Kevin Maguire, Kevin West	472	Mar 20, 2019	Captain America #395 cover: 978-1302916206
17	The Superia Stratagem	1991-1992	Captain America #387–397; Adventures of Captain America #1–4	#387-397	Mark Gruenwald, Fabian Nicieza	Rik Levins, Larry Alexander, Kevin Maguire, Kevin West	472	Feb 4, 2025	Captain America #395 cover: 978-1302960469
18	Blood and Glory	1992	Captain America #398-410; Punisher/Captain America: Blood and Glory #1–3	#398-410	Mark Gruenwald, Daniel Chichester, Margaret Clark	Rik Levins, Larry Alexander, Klaus Janson	496	Mar 18, 2020	Captain America #400 cover: 978-1302922795
19	Arena of Death	1992-1993	Captain America #411-419, Annual #11-12; Ghost Rider/Captain America: Fear #1; U.S.Agent #1-4; material from Silver Sable & the Wild Pack #15	#411-419	Mark Gruenwald, Howard Mackie	Lee Weeks, Rik Levins, M.C. Wyman	496	Mar 8, 2022	Captain America #414 cover: 978-1302934453
20	Fighting Chance	1993-1995	Captain America #420-430, Annual #13; Nomad #18-19; Captain America: The Medusa Effect #1; Captain America/Nick Fury: Blood Truce #1	#420-430	Mark Gruenwald, Roy Thomas	Rik Levins, M.C. Wyman, Dave Hoover	496	May 1, 2023	Captain America #427 cover: 978-1302951566
21	Twilight's Last Gleaming	1994-1995	Captain America #431-443; Tales of Suspense (vol. 2) #1; Avengers #386-388; material from Captain America Collectors' Preview	#431-443	Mark Gruenwald	Andrew Robinson, Bob Harras, Dave Hoover, Colin MacNeil	480	Feb 6, 2024	Avengers #387 cover: 978-1302956349
22	Man Without a Country	1995-1996	Captain America #444–454, Ashcan Edition, Thor #496, Iron Man #326, Avengers #396, Captain America: The Legend; material from Captain America Collectors' Preview	#444-454	Mark Waid	Ron Garney	456	Apr 20, 2016	Captain America #450 cover: 978-0785195108
24	American Nightmare	1998-1999	Captain America (vol. 3) #1–14, Iron Man & Captain America Annual (1998); Captain America & Citizen V Annual (1998)	#468-481	Mark Waid	Ron Garney, Andy Kubert, Mark Bagley, Patrick Zircher	488	Dec 30, 2025	Captain America (vol. 3) #1 cover: 978-1302965273
25	Twisted Tomorrows	1999-2000	Captain America (vol. 3) #15-31; Captain America Annual 1999	#482-498	Mark Waid, Dan Jurgens, Joe Casey	Andy Kubert, Lee Weeks, Ron Frenz, Brent Anderson, Pablo Raimondi	472	Jun 15, 2027	Captain America (vol. 3) #24 cover: 978-1302972134
Jump to: Captain America Modern Era Epic Collection

=== Carnage ===
The villain Carnage has never had an ongoing series, with all Epic Collection releases compiled of miniseries, or appearances in various Spider-Man comics. Large parts of Carnage Volume 1: Born in Blood are also reprinted in Amazing Spider-Man Volume 25: Maximum Carnage.

Spine lettering: Maroon
#	Subtitle	Years covered	Issues collected	Writers	Artists	Pages	Released	ISBN
1	Born in Blood	1991-1994	Amazing Spider-Man #361-363, 378–380, Web of Spider-Man #101-103, Spider-Man #35-37, Spectacular Spider-Man #201-203; material from Spider-Man Unlimited #1-2, Amazing Spider-Man Annual #28	David Michelinie, Terry Kavanagh, J.M. DeMatteis	Mark Bagley, Alex Saviuk, Tom Lyle, Sal Buscema	472	Mar 23, 2022	Amazing Spider-Man #362 cover: 978-1302946623
2	Web of Carnage	1994-1997	Amazing Spider-Man #403, 410, and more: Venom: Carnage Unleashed #1-4, Carnage: Mind Bomb, Sensational Spider-Man #3, Spider-Man #67, Spectacular Spider-Man #233, Carnage: It's A Wonderful Life, Venom: On Trial #2-3; material from: Amazing Spider-Man Super Special, Spider-Man Super Special, Venom Super Special, Spectacular Spider-Man Super Special, Web of Spider-Man Super Special	Larry Hama, David Michelinie	Mark Bagley, Andrew Wildman, Kyle Hotz, Josh Hood	480	Mar 21, 2023	Spectacular Spider-Man #233 cover: 978-1302951092
3	The Monster Inside	1998-2005	Amazing Spider-Man #430-431, and more: Peter Parker: Spider-Man #13; Webspinners: Tales of Spider-Man #13-14; Venom vs. Carnage #1-4; Toxin #1-6; X-Men/Spider-Man #3 (2009); What If? #108	Tom DeFalco, Howard Mackie, Peter Milligan	Clayton Crain, Darick Robertson	432	Mar 19, 2024	Peter Parker: Spider-Man #13 cover: 978-1302956363
Jump to: Carnage Modern Era Epic Collection

=== Conan ===
From 2022, Marvel lost the license to publish new Conan comics. "The trademark for the name Conan and the names of Robert E. Howard's other principal characters, is maintained by Conan Properties International and licensed to Cabinet Entertainment. This company, or new owners, now wish to publish Conan comic books themselves. And so won't be renewing the Marvel Comics license."

This led to the cancellation of the second King Conan Epic Collection. The license ended up with Titan Publishing.

==== Conan the Barbarian: The Original Marvel Years ====
Spine lettering: Orange
#	Subtitle	Years covered	Issues collected	Writers	Artists	Pages	Released	ISBN
1	The Coming of Conan	1970-1972	Conan the Barbarian #1-13; material from Chamber of Darkness #4	Roy Thomas	Barry Windsor-Smith	352	Jun 23, 2020	Conan the Barbarian #1 cover: 978-1302925550
2	Hawks from the Sea	1972-1973	Conan the Barbarian #14-26	Roy Thomas	Barry Windsor-Smith	288	Mar 23, 2021	Conan the Barbarian #24 cover: 978-1302926557
3	The Curse of the Golden Skull	1973-1974	Conan the Barbarian #27-42; material from Annual #1	Roy Thomas	John Buscema	336	Aug 10, 2021	Conan the Barbarian #34 cover: 978-1302929565
4	Queen of the Black Coast	1974-1976	Conan the Barbarian #43-59; material from Savage Sword of Conan #1	Roy Thomas	John Buscema	360	Nov 30, 2021	Conan the Barbarian #58 cover: 978-1302929558
5	Of Once and Future Kings	1976-1977	Conan the Barbarian #60-71, Annual #2-3, Power Records #31	Roy Thomas	John Buscema	360	Mar 29, 2022	Conan the Barbarian #68 cover: 978-1302933531
6	Vengeance in Asgalun	1977-1978	Conan the Barbarian #72-88	Roy Thomas	John Buscema, Howard Chaykin	328	Sep 22, 2022	Conan the Barbarian #72 cover: 978-1302933548

==== Conan Chronicles ====
Spine lettering: Yellow
#	Subtitle	Years covered	Issues collected	Writers	Artists	Pages	Released	ISBN
1	Out of the Darksome Hills	2003–2005	Conan (2004) #0, #1–19	Kurt Busiek, Fabian Nicieza	Cary Nord, Thomas Yeates, Greg Ruth, Tom Mandrake	496	Feb 6, 2019	Conan (2004) #1 cover: 978-1302915902
2	The Heart of Yag-Kosha	2005–2007	Conan (2004) #20–39	Kurt Busiek, Mike Mignola, Timothy Truman	Cary Nord, Greg Ruth, Paul Lee	504	Apr 3, 2019	Conan (2004) #30 cover: 978-1302915919
3	Return to Cimmeria	2007–2009	Conan (2004) #40–50; Conan the Cimmerian #0–7	Timothy Truman, Kurt Busiek	Paul Lee, Cary Nord, Tomas Giorello, Greg Ruth, Richard Corben	504	Oct 2, 2019	Conan the Cimmerian #3 cover: 978-1302916022
4	The Battle of Shamla Pass	2009-2010	Conan the Cimmerian #8-25	Timothy Truman	Tomas Giorello, Joe Kubert, Paul Lee	472	Jan 14, 2020	Conan the Cimmerian #8 cover: 978-1302921910
5	The Horrors Beneath the Stones	2010-2012	Conan: Road of Kings #1-12; Conan the Barbarian #1-6	Roy Thomas, Brian Wood	Mike Hawthorne, Dan Panosian, Becky Cloonan, James Harren	456	Jun 16, 2020	Conan: Road of Kings #6 cover: 978-1302923273
6	The Song of Bêlit	2012-2014	Conan the Barbarian #7-25	Brian Wood	Vasilis Lolos, Declan Shalvey, Mirko Colak, Davide Gianfelice, Paul Azaceta, Riccardo Burchielli	472	Jan 26, 2021	Conan the Barbarian #7 cover: 978-1302923280
7	Shadows over Kush	2014-2015	Conan the Avenger #1-19	Fred Van Lente	Brian Ching, Eduardo Francisco, Guiu Vilanova	448	Jan 4, 2022	Conan the Avengers #15 cover: 978-1302930721
8	Blood in His Wake	2015-2017	Conan the Avenger #20-25, Conan the Slayer #1-12	Fred Van Lente, Cullen Bunn	Brian Ching, Sergio Davila	432	Jan 18, 2022	Conan the Slayer #9 cover: 978-1302933708

==== King Conan Chronicles ====
Spine lettering: Orange
#	Subtitle	Years covered	Issues collected	Writers	Artists	Pages	Released	ISBN
1	Phantoms and Phoenixes	2006-2013	Conan and the Midnight God (2007) #1-5, King Conan: The Scarlet Citadel (2011) #1-4, King Conan: The Phoenix on the Sword (2012) #1-4, Conan: The Phantoms of the Black Coast (2012) #1-5; material from Age of Conan: Hyborian Adventures (2006) #1	Joshua Dysart, Timothy Truman	Victor Gischler, Will Conrad, Tomas Giorello, Attila Futaki	464	Aug 16, 2022	Conan: The Phantoms of the Black Coast #1 cover: 978-1302945954
2	Wolves and Dragons	2012-2016	King Conan: The Hour of the Dragon (2013) #1-6, King Conan: The Conqueror (2014) #1-6, Conan: Wolves Beyond the Border (2015) #1-4; material from Robert E. Howard's Savage Sword #5	Timothy Truman	Tomas Giorello, Jose Villarrubia,	416	Cancelled	King Conan: The Conqueror #3 cover: 978-1302948184

=== Daredevil ===
Notable storylines include Frank Miller's run, through volumes eight and nine; the fall of Kingpin in Vol. 15: Last Rites; and the introduction of Typhoid Mary in Vol. 13: A Touch Of Typhoid.

- See also: Daredevil collected editions

Spine lettering: Maroon
#	Subtitle	Years covered	Issues collected	Writers	Artists	Pages	Released	ISBN
1	The Man Without Fear	1964-1966	Daredevil #1–21	Stan Lee	Wally Wood, John Romita Sr.	472	Jul 13, 2016	Daredevil #4 cover: 978-0785195481
1	The Man Without Fear	1964-1966	Daredevil #1–21	Stan Lee	Wally Wood, John Romita Sr.	472	Feb 14, 2023	Daredevil #4 cover: 978-1302950361
2	Mike Murdock Must Die!	1966-1968	Daredevil #22–41, Annual #1; Fantastic Four #73; material from Not Brand Echh #4	Stan Lee	Gene Colan	520	Feb 14, 2018	Daredevil #41 cover: 978-1302910044
2	Mike Murdock Must Die!	1966-1968	Daredevil #22–41, Annual #1; Fantastic Four #73; material from Not Brand Echh #4	Stan Lee	Gene Colan	520	Oct 24, 2023	Daredevil #41 cover: 978-1302950569
3	Brother, Take My Hand	1968-1970	Daredevil #42–63	Stan Lee, Roy Thomas	Gene Colan, Barry Windsor Smith	472	Feb 22, 2017	Daredevil #48 cover: 978-1302904258
4	A Woman Called Widow	1970-1972	Daredevil #64–86; Iron Man #35; material from Iron Man #36	Roy Thomas, Gerry Conway	Gene Colan	512	Nov 6, 2019	Daredevil #80 cover: 978-1302920340
4	A Woman Called Widow	1970-1972	Daredevil #64–86; Iron Man #35; material from Iron Man #36	Roy Thomas, Gerry Conway	Gene Colan	512	Feb 20, 2024	Daredevil #80 cover: 978-1302957933
5	Going Out West	1972-1974	Daredevil #87-107; Avengers #111	Gerry Conway, Steve Gerber	Gene Colan, Don Heck	472	Jan 18, 2022	Daredevil #91 cover: 978-1302933555
6	Watch Out for Bullseye	1974-1976	Daredevil #108-132; Marvel Two-in-One #3	Steve Gerber, Tony Isabella, Marv Wolfman	Bob Brown, Gene Colan	528	Mar 28, 2023	Daredevil #115 cover: 978-1302948672
7	The Concrete Jungle	1976-1978	Daredevil #133-154, Annual 4; Ghost Rider #20; Marvel Premiere #39-40, 43; material from Ghost Rider #19	Marv Wolfman, Jim Shooter, Roger McKenzie	Bob Brown, Gil Kane, Carmine Infantino	528	Apr 2, 2024	Daredevil #154 cover: 978-1302955175
8	To Dare The Devil	1978-1981	Daredevil #155-176; material from What If #28; Bizarre Adventures #28	Roger McKenzie, Frank Miller	Frank Miller	496	Sep 2, 2025	Daredevil #174 cover: 978-1302960537
9	Resurrection	1981-1983	Daredevil #177-193; material from Marvel Fanfare #1; What If...? #35	Frank Miller	Klaus Janson	496	Dec 1, 2026	Daredevil #189 cover: 978-1302967925
10	Redemption	1983-1985	Daredevil #194-215	Dennis O’Neil with Steven Grant, Harlan Ellison, Arthur Byron Cover, David Mazzucchelli & Mike Carlin	David Mazzucchelli & William Johnson with Klaus Janson, Luke McDonnell, Geof Isherwood & Larry Hama	520	Mar 9, 2027	Daredevil #214 cover: 978-1302971168
12	It Comes with the Claws	1986-1988	Daredevil #234-252	Ann Nocenti	Steve Ditko, Louis Williams, Rick Leonardi, John Romita Jr.	480	Nov 1, 2022	Daredevil #238 cover: 978-1302945947
13	A Touch of Typhoid	1988-1989	Daredevil #253–270; Punisher #10	Ann Nocenti	John Romita Jr.	472	Jan 20, 2016	Daredevil #256 cover: 978-0785196884
13	A Touch of Typhoid	1988-1989	Daredevil #253–270; Punisher #10	Ann Nocenti	John Romita Jr.	472	Jul 11, 2023	Daredevil #256 cover: 978-1302950491
14	Heart of Darkness	1989-1990	Daredevil #271–282, Annual #5–6; material from Punisher Annual #3; Incredible Hulk Annual #16; Silver Surfer Annual #3	Gregory Wright, Ann Nocenti, Peter David	Mark Bagley, John Romita Jr. Angel Medina	488	Sep 20, 2017	Daredevil #272 cover: 978-1302907914
14	Heart of Darkness	1989-1990	Daredevil #271–282, Annual #5–6; material from Punisher Annual #3; Incredible Hulk Annual #16; Silver Surfer Annual #3	Gregory Wright, Ann Nocenti, Peter David	Mark Bagley, John Romita Jr. Angel Medina	488	Feb 8, 2022	Daredevil #272 cover: 978-1302933777
15	Last Rites	1990-1992	Daredevil #283-300, Annual #7	Gregory Wright, Ann Nocenti, Daniel Chichester	Lee Weeks, Kieron Dwyer, Ron Garney	504	Dec 1, 2020	Daredevil #300 cover: 978-1302925635
15	Last Rites	1990-1992	Daredevil #283-300, Annual #7	Gregory Wright, Ann Nocenti, Daniel Chichester	Lee Weeks, Kieron Dwyer, Ron Garney	504	Dec 12, 2023	Daredevil #300 cover: 978-1302950590
16	Dead Man's Hand	1992-1993	Daredevil #301-311, Annual #8; Nomad #4-6; Punisher War Journal #45-47; material from Marvel Holiday Special #2	Daniel Chichester, Fabian Nicieza	M.C. Wyman, Scott McDaniel, Pat Olliffe	472	Nov 30, 2021	Daredevil #308 cover: 978-1302932381
17	Into the Fire	1993-1994	Daredevil #312-318, Annual #9; Daredevil/Black Widow: Abattoir; Daredevil: The Man Without Fear #1-5	Daniel Chichester, Frank Miller	Scott McDaniel, John Romita Jr.	528	Aug 8, 2023	Daredevil: The Man Without Fear #3 cover: 978-1302953720
18	Fall from Grace	1993-1994	Daredevil #319–332, Annual #10	Daniel Chichester, Gregory Wright	Scott McDaniel, Sergio Cariello, Kris Renkewitz	456	Apr 9, 2014	Daredevil Annual #10 cover: 978-0785185161
18	Fall from Grace	1993-1994	Daredevil #319–332, Annual #10	Daniel Chichester, Gregory Wright	Scott McDaniel, Sergio Cariello, Kris Renkewitz	456	Jun 4, 2024	Daredevil Annual #10 cover: 978-1302957872
19	Root of Evil	1994-1995	Daredevil #333–344; Elektra: Root of Evil #1–4	Gregory Wright, Daniel Chichester	Tom Grindberg, Scott McDaniel, Alexander Jubran, Keith Pollard	440	Jul 25, 2018	Daredevil #344 cover: 978-1302912581
19	Root of Evil	1994-1995	Daredevil #333–344; Elektra: Root of Evil #1–4	Gregory Wright, Daniel Chichester	Tom Grindberg, Scott McDaniel, Alexander Jubran, Keith Pollard	440	Aug 13, 2024	Daredevil #344 cover: 978-1302957919
20	Purgatory & Paradise	1995-1997	Daredevil #345–364	J.M. DeMatteis, Karl Kesel	Ron Wagner, Cary Nord, Shawn McManus, Gene Colan	488	Jun 5, 2019	Daredevil #347 cover: 978-1302918798
21	Widow's Kiss	1997-1998	Daredevil #365–380, −1; Daredevil/Deadpool Annual '97	Joe Kelly, Scott Lobdell	Gene Colan, Ariel Olivetti, Cully Hamner, Tom Morgan	504	Aug 19, 2015	Daredevil #366 cover: 978-0785192978
Jump to: Daredevil Modern Era Epic Collection

=== Deadpool ===
The first appearance of Deadpool is also contained in New Mutants Epic Collection Volume 8: The End of the Beginning. Volume 1 of his own Epic Collection contains various cameos and miniseries, before the character's first ongoing series is collected from Volume 2: Mission Improbable.

Spine lettering: Red
#	Subtitle	Years covered	Issues collected	Legacy	Writers	Artists	Pages	Released	ISBN
1	The Circle Chase	1991-1994	New Mutants #98; X-Force #2, 11, 15; Nomad #4; Deadpool: The Circle Chase #1-4; Secret Defenders #15-17; Deadpool #1-4; material from Avengers #366; Silver Sable & the Wild Pack #23	#1-8	Rob Liefeld, Fabian Nicieza, Mark Waid	Rob Liefeld, Joe Madureira, Ian Churchill	472	Nov 9, 2021	New Mutants #98 cover: 978-1302932053
2	Mission Improbable	1994-1997	Wolverine #88; X-Force #47 & 56; Deadpool (vol. 2) #1-9 & -1; Daredevil/Deadpool Annual 1997; material from Wolverine Annual 1995	#9-17	Jeph Loeb, Joe Kelly	Adam Pollina, Ed McGuinness, Bernard Chang	448	Oct 25, 2022	Deadpool (vol. 2) #2 cover: 978-1302948177
3	Drowning Man	1997-1998	Deadpool (vol. 2) #10-20; Deadpool/Death Annual '98; Heroes for Hire #10-11; Baby's First Deadpool Book #1; Amazing Spider-Man #47	#18-28	Joe Kelly, John Ostrander	Pete Woods, Walter McDaniel, Tony Harris	464	Jan 9, 2024	Deadpool (vol. 2) #15 cover: 978-1302953324
4	Dead Reckoning	1998-1999	Deadpool (vol. 2) #0, 21–33; Deadpool Team-Up #1; Encyclopaedia Deadpoolica #1	#29-41	Joe Kelly, James Felder	Pete Woods, Walter McDaniel, David Brewer	472	Jul 4, 2023	Deadpool (vol. 2) #21 cover: 978-1302951825
5	Johnny Handsome	1999-2000	Deadpool (vol. 2) #34-45; Black Panther (vol. 3) #23; Wolverine (vol. 2) #154-155; Heroes Reborn: Remnants #1; Fight Man #1; material from Wolverine Annual 1999	#42-53	Christopher Priest	Paco Diaz, Jim Calafiore, Rob Liefeld, Evan Dorkin	488	Sep 3, 2024	Wolverine (vol. 2) #155 cover: 978-1302959579
6	Funeral for a Freak	2000-2002	Deadpool (vol. 2) #46-64; material from X-Men Unlimited #28	#54-72	Jimmy Palmiotti, Buddy Scalera & Frank Tieri	Paul Chadwick, Michael Lopez, Darick Robertson, Anthony Williams, Georges Jeanty, Karl Kerschl, Jim Calafiore & Liam Sharp	472	Jan 12, 2027	Deadpool #50 cover: 978-1302969462
7	Agent X	2002-2003	Deadpool (vol. 2) #65-69; Agent X #1-15	#73-92	Gail Simone, Buddy Scalera, Evan Dorkin	Udon Studios, Mitch Breitweiser, Juan Bobillo	496	Jul 8, 2025	Agent X #15 cover: 978-1302964078
Jump to: Deadpool & Cable Modern Era Epic Collection
Jump to: Deadpool Modern Era Epic Collection
Jump to: Spider-Man/Deadpool Modern Era Epic Collection

=== Defenders ===
Doctor Strange led the initial version of Defenders, with a team also composed of Hulk and Namor. As opposed to other Marvel teams, such as The Fantastic Four or Avengers, Defenders tended to focus on mystical enemies.

The origin of the team is also covered in Doctor Strange Epic Collection Volume 3: A Separate Reality; Incredible Hulk Epic Collection Volume 4: In the Hands of HYDRA and Namor The Sub-Mariner Epic Collection Volume 3: Who Strikes for Atlantis?

Spine lettering: Green
#	Subtitle	Years covered	Issues collected	Writers	Artists	Pages	Released	ISBN
1	The Day of the Defenders	1969-1973	Doctor Strange #183; Sub-Mariner #22, 34–35; Incredible Hulk (vol. 2) #126; Marvel Feature #1-3; Defenders #1-11; Avengers #116-118; material from Avengers #115	Roy Thomas, Steve Englehart	Sal Buscema, Ross Andru, Bob Brown	480	Dec 27, 2022	Marvel Feature #1 cover: 978-1302933562
2	Enter: The Headmen	1974-1975	Defenders #12-25; Giant-Size Defenders #1-4; Marvel Two-in-One #6-7; material from Mystery Tales #21; World of Fantasy #11; Tales of Suspense #9	Len Wein, Steve Gerber	Sal Buscema	464	Jun 25, 2024	Defenders #15 cover: 978-1302955311
3	World Gone Sane	1975-1976	Defenders #26-41, Annual #1; Giant-Size Defenders #5; Marvel Treasury Edition #12	Steve Gerber	Sal Buscema	408	Apr 1, 2025	Defenders #36 cover: 978-1302960544
6	The Six-Fingered Hand	1981-1982	Defenders #92–109; Marvel Team-Up #101; Captain America #268	J.M. DeMatteis	Don Perlin	480	Aug 24, 2016	Defenders #94 cover: 978-0785195993
7	Ashes, Ashes...	1982-1983	Defenders #110–125; Avengers Annual #11	J.M. DeMatteis	Don Perlin	440	Aug 30, 2017	Defenders #112 cover: 978-1302904289
Despite the volume numbering continuing, the cover title changes to The New Defenders from volume 8
8	The New Defenders	1983-1985	New Defenders #126–137; Iceman #1–4; Beauty And The Beast #1–4	J.M. DeMatteis, Peter Gillis, Ann Nocenti	Don Perlin, Alan Kupperberg	488	Aug 15, 2018	New Defenders #128 cover: 978-1302912031
9	The End of All Songs	1984-1986	New Defenders #138–152; Gargoyle #1–4	Peter B. Gillis, J.M. DeMatteis	Don Perlin, Mark Badger	488	Dec 18, 2019	New Defenders #142 cover: 978-1302920708

=== Doctor Doom ===
#	Subtitle	Years covered	Issues collected	Writers	Artists	Pages	Released	ISBN
1	Enter... Doctor Doom	1962-1969	Fantastic Four #5-6, 10, 16–17, 23, 39–40, 57–60, 73; Annual #2-3; Amazing Spider-Man #5; Avengers #25; Daredevil #37-38; Marvel Super Heroes #20	Stan Lee	Jack Kirby, Steve Ditko, Don Heck, Gene Colan	488	Nov 11, 2025	Fantastic Four Annual #2 cover: 978-1302966126
2	Revolution In Latveria	1969-1974	Fantastic Four #84-87, 116, 142–144; Sub-Mariner #20, 47–49; Thor #182-183; Incredible Hulk #143-144; Hero For Hire #8-9; material from Astonishing Tales #1-8	Stan Lee, Gerry Conway	Jack Kirby, John Buscema, Gene Colan	488	May 19, 2026	Fantastic Four #84 cover: 978-1302968458

=== Doctor Strange ===
Created by Steve Ditko, Doctor Strange first appeared in Strange Tales #110. The character was popular enough that the book became Doctor Strange with issue #169.

Major stories for the character include Triumph & Torment (Volume 8) and A Separate Reality (Volume 3).

Spine lettering: Purple
#	Subtitle	Years covered	Issues collected	Writers	Artists	Pages	Released	ISBN
1	Master of the Mystic Arts	1963-1966	Strange Tales #110–111, 114–146; Amazing Spider-Man Annual #2	Stan Lee, Steve Ditko	Steve Ditko	400	Oct 17, 2018	Doctor Strange Pinup Cover: 978-1302911386
1	Master of the Mystic Arts	1963-1966	Strange Tales #110–111, 114–146; Amazing Spider-Man Annual #2	Stan Lee, Steve Ditko	Steve Ditko	400	Aug 4, 2021	Doctor Strange Pinup Cover: 978-1302929688
2	I, Dormammu	1966-1969	Strange Tales #147-168; Doctor Strange #169-179; Avengers #61; material from Not Brand Echh #13	Stan Lee, Roy Thomas	Bill Everett, Marie Severin, Dan Adkins, Gene Colan	504	Jan 9, 2024	Doctor Strange #169 cover: 978-1302953157
3	A Separate Reality	1969-1974	Doctor Strange #180–183; Sub-Mariner #22; Incredible Hulk #126; Marvel Feature #1; Marvel Premiere #3–14; Doctor Strange (vol. 2) #1–5	Roy Thomas, Steve Englehart	Gene Colan, Frank Brunner	472	Oct 19, 2016	Doctor Strange (vol. 2) #1 cover: 978-0785194446
3	A Separate Reality	1969-1974	Doctor Strange #180–183; Sub-Mariner #22; Incredible Hulk #126; Marvel Feature #1; Marvel Premiere #3–14; Doctor Strange (vol. 2) #1–5	Roy Thomas, Steve Englehart	Gene Colan, Frank Brunner	472	Dec 21, 2021	Doctor Strange (vol. 2) #1 cover: 978-1302932480
4	Alone Against Eternity	1975-1978	Doctor Strange (vol. 2) #6-28, Annual #1; Tomb of Dracula #44	Steve Englehart, Marv Wolfman, Jim Starlin	Gene Colan, Philip Russell, Jim Starlin	488	Feb 9, 2021	Doctor Strange (vol. 2) #19 cover: 978-1302921996
5	The Reality War	1978-1982	Doctor Strange (vol. 2) #29-51; Man-Thing #4; material from Chamber of Chills #3-4 (1973); Defenders #53 (1977)	Roger Stern, Chris Claremont	Gene Colan, Tom Sutton, Marshall Rogers	504	Feb 22, 2022	Doctor Strange (vol. 2) #32 cover: 978-1302933579
8	Triumph and Torment	1988–1990	Doctor Strange, Sorcerer Supreme #1–13; Marvel Graphic Novel No. 49 - Doctor Strange and Doctor Doom: Triumph and Torment	Peter B. Gillis, Roy Thomas, Roger Stern	Richard Case, Butch Guice, Mike Mignolia	488	Oct 23, 2019	Doctor Strange, Sorcerer Supreme #1 cover: 978-1302920562
8	Triumph and Torment	1988–1990	Doctor Strange, Sorcerer Supreme #1–13; Marvel Graphic Novel No. 49 - Doctor Strange and Doctor Doom: Triumph and Torment	Peter B. Gillis, Roy Thomas, Roger Stern	Richard Case, Butch Guice, Mike Mignolia	488	Mar 21, 2023	Doctor Strange, Sorcerer Supreme #1 cover: 978-1302950408
9	The Vampiric Verses	1990–1991	Doctor Strange, Sorcerer Supreme #14–33; Ghost Rider (vol. 3) #12	Roy Thomas, Dann Thomas	Jean-Marc Lofficier, Butch Guice, Chris Marrinan	504	Aug 10, 2021	Doctor Strange, Sorcerer Supreme #19 cover: 978-1302930745
10	Infinity War	1991–1992	Doctor Strange, Sorcerer Supreme #34–47, Annual #2; Silver Surfer (vol. 3) #67; Spider-Man/Dr. Strange: The Way To Dusty Death	Roy Thomas, Dann Thomas	Don Lawlis, Geof Isherwood, Michael Bair	480	Aug 2, 2022	Doctor Strange, Sorcerer Supreme #37 cover: 978-1302945374
11	Nightmare on Bleecker Street	1992-1994	Doctor Strange, Sorcerer Supreme #48-61, Annual #3; Morbius the Living Vampire #9; material from Marvel Super-Heroes #12, 14, Marvel Comics Presents #146	Len Kaminski, Roy Thomas, David Quinn	Geof Isherwood, Mel Rubi	488	Jan 31, 2023	Doctor Strange, Sorcerer Supreme #54 cover: 978-1302951054
12	Strangers Among Us	1994-1995	Doctor Strange, Sorcerer Supreme #62-75, Annual #4; Midnight Sons Unlimited #6	David Quinn	Melvin Rubi, Kyle Hotz, Peter Gross, Mark Buckingham	472	Nov 11, 2025	Midnight Sons Unlimited #6 cover: 978-1302965174
13	Afterlife	1994–1997	Strange Tales (vol. 3) #1; Doctor Strange, Sorcerer Supreme #76–90, Ashcan Edition; Doctor Strange: What Is It That Disturbs You, Stephen?	David Quinn, Warren Ellis, J.M. DeMatteis	Evan Skolnick, Marie Severin, Mark Buckingham	496	Oct 4, 2017	Doctor Strange, Sorcerer Supreme #83 cover: 978-1302907891

=== Excalibur ===
The basic pitch of Excalibur is X-Men set in the United Kingdom. Writer Chris Claremont, who worked on Uncanny X-Men for 16 years, was born in London and launched the series in 1987. The initial line-up contained former X-Men Shadowcat, Phoenix and Nightcrawler - as well as fellow Claremont creation, Captain Britain.

Spine lettering: Blue
#	Subtitle	Years covered	Issues collected	Writers	Artists	Pages	Released	ISBN
1	The Sword Is Drawn	1988-1989	Captain Britain #1–2 (1976), Excalibur #1–11, Excalibur Special Edition, Excalibur – Mojo Mayhem #1; material from Mighty World of Marvel #7 (1983), #14–15 (1984), Marvel Comics Presents #31–38	Chris Claremont, Michael Higgins	Alan Davis, Marshall Rogers, Arthur Adams, Erik Larsen	496	Mar 15, 2017	Excalibur #1 cover: 978-1302904340
1	The Sword Is Drawn	1988-1989	Captain Britain #1–2 (1976), Excalibur #1–11, Excalibur Special Edition, Excalibur – Mojo Mayhem #1; material from Mighty World of Marvel #7 (1983), #14–15 (1984), Marvel Comics Presents #31–38	Chris Claremont, Michael Higgins	Alan Davis, Marshall Rogers, Arthur Adams, Erik Larsen	496	Jun 22, 2022	Excalibur #1 cover: 978-1302946838
2	The Cross-Time Caper	1989-1990	Excalibur #12–30	Chris Claremont, Michael Higgins	Alan Davis, Ron Lim, Chris Wozniak	464	Feb 21, 2018	Excalibur #14 cover: 978-1302910129
3	Girls' School from Heck	1990-1991	Excalibur #31–41, Weird War III, The Possession, Air Apparent, Sensational She-Hulk #26; material from Marvel Comics Presents #75	Scott Lobdell, Chris Claremont, Michael Higgins	Ron Wagner, Tom Morgan, Mark Badger	464	Feb 13, 2019	Excalibur Air Apparent #1 cover: 978-1302916527
4	Curiouser and Curiouser	1991-1992	Excalibur #42-58, Excalibur: XX Crossing; material from Marvel Comics Presents #110	Alan Davis, Scott Lobdell	Doug Braithwaite, Will Simpson, James Fry, Joe Madureira	472	Mar 10, 2020	Excalibur #57 cover: 978-1302922764
5	Days of Futures Yet To Come	1992-1994	Excalibur #59-75, Annual #1	Alan Davis, Scott Lobdell, Richard Ashford	Ken Lashley	520	Dec 3, 2024	Excalibur #65 cover: 978-1302959944
6	The Douglock Chronicles	1994-1995	Excalibur #76-87; Annual #2; X-Factor #106; X-Force #38; material from Marvel Comics Presents #174	Scott Lobdell, Chris Cooper, Warren Ellis	Ken Lashley, John Royle	472	Oct 6, 2026	Excalibur #78 cover: 978-1302969479
8	The Battle for Britain	1996-1998	Excalibur #104-115, -1; Colossus #1; Kitty Pryde: Agent of S.H.I.E.L.D. #1–3; New Mutants: Truth Or Death #1-3	Ben Raab	Bryan Hitch, Salvador Larroca, Pete Woods, Bernard Chang	504	Feb 1, 2022	Excalibur #107 cover: 978-1302934460
9	You Are Cordially Invited	1998-2001	Excalibur #116-125; X-Men Unlimited #19; X-Men: True Friends #1-3; Excalibur (vol. 2) #1-4	Ben Raab, Chris Claremont	Mel Rubi, Rick Leonardi, Pablo Raimondi	504	Nov 28, 2023	Excalibur #125 cover: 978-1302953331

=== Fantastic Four ===
Fantastic Four was created by Stan Lee and Jack Kirby, with Kirby drawing the first 102 issues. A storyline highlight includes the debut of Galactus, plus This Man, This Monster! in Volume 3: The Coming Of Galactus.

Spine lettering: Blue
#	Subtitle	Years covered	Issues collected	Writers	Artists	Pages	Released	ISBN
1	The World's Greatest Comic Magazine	1961-1963	Fantastic Four #1–18	Stan Lee	Jack Kirby	456	Sep 10, 2014	Fantastic Four #6 cover: 978-0785188322
1	The World's Greatest Comic Magazine	1961-1963	Fantastic Four #1–18	Stan Lee	Jack Kirby	456	Sep 7, 2021	Fantastic Four #6 cover: 978-1302931544
1	The World's Greatest Comic Magazine	1961-1963	Fantastic Four #1–18	Stan Lee	Jack Kirby	456	Oct 8, 2024	Fantastic Four #6 cover: 978-1302960421
2	The Master Plan of Doctor Doom	1963-1964	Fantastic Four #19–32, Annual #1–2	Stan Lee	Jack Kirby	448	Jun 28, 2017	Fantastic Four #27 cover: 978-1302904357
2	The Master Plan of Doctor Doom	1963-1964	Fantastic Four #19–32, Annual #1–2	Stan Lee	Jack Kirby	448	Apr 6, 2021	Fantastic Four #27 cover: 978-1302928285
3	The Coming of Galactus	1964-1966	Fantastic Four #33–51, Annual #3	Stan Lee	Jack Kirby	448	Aug 1, 2018	Fantastic Four #49 cover: 978-1302913311
3	The Coming of Galactus	1964-1966	Fantastic Four #33–51, Annual #3	Stan Lee	Jack Kirby	448	Feb 12, 2020	Fantastic Four #49 cover: 978-1302924652
3	The Coming of Galactus	1964-1966	Fantastic Four #33–51, Annual #3	Stan Lee	Jack Kirby	448	Apr 4, 2023	Fantastic Four #49 cover: 978-1302950415
4	The Mystery of the Black Panther	1966-1967	Fantastic Four #52–67, Annual #4–5; material from Not Brand Echh #1, 5	Stan Lee	Jack Kirby	448	Aug 21, 2019	Fantastic Four #52 cover: 978-1302915568
4	The Mystery of the Black Panther	1966-1967	Fantastic Four #52–67, Annual #4–5; material from Not Brand Echh #1, 5	Stan Lee	Jack Kirby	448	Oct 18, 2022	Fantastic Four #52 cover: 978-1302947088
5	The Name Is Doom	1967-1969	Fantastic Four #68-87, Annual #6; material from Not Brand Echh #6-7	Stan Lee	Jack Kirby	504	Jun 24, 2020	Fantastic Four #86 cover: 978-1302922030
6	At War with Atlantis	1969-1970	Fantastic Four #88-104, Annual #7; Fantastic Four: The Lost Adventure #1 (2008)	Stan Lee	Jack Kirby	408	Nov 10, 2020	Fantastic Four #89 cover: 978-1302922023
7	Battle of the Behemoths	1970-1972	Fantastic Four #105-125	Stan Lee	John Buscema	472	Sep 7, 2021	Fantastic Four #112 cover: 978-1302929138
8	Annihilus Revealed	1972-1974	Fantastic Four #126-146; Giant-Size Super-Stars #1	Roy Thomas, Gerry Conway	John Buscema, Ross Andru, Rich Buckler	504	Aug 30, 2022	Fantastic Four #133 cover: 978-1302933593
9	The Crusader Syndrome	1974-1976	Fantastic Four #147-167; Giant-Size Fantastic Four #2-4; Avengers #127	Gerry Conway, Roy Thomas	Rich Buckler, John Buscema, George Perez	512	Aug 29, 2023	Fantastic Four #166 cover: 978-1302948757
10	Counter-Earth Must Die	1976-1978	Fantastic Four #168–191, Annual #11; Marvel Two-in-One #20, Annual #1	Roy Thomas, Len Wein	George Perez, John Buscema, Sal Buscema	512	Sep 24, 2024	Fantastic Four #175 cover: 978-1302955441
11	Four No More	1977-1980	Fantastic Four #192-214, Annual #12-13	Marv Wolfman	Keith Pollard, John Byrne, Sal Buscema	520	Mar 4, 2025	Fantastic Four #211 cover: 978-1302960551
12	The Possession of Franklin Richards	1979-1981	Fantastic Four #215-231, Annual #14-16	Marv Wolfman, Doug Moench, Roger Stern	John Byrne, Bill Sienkiewicz, Jerome Moore	472	Aug 5, 2025	Fantastic Four #218 cover: 978-1302960568
13	Back to the Basics	1981-1982	Fantastic Four #232-248, Roast (1982); material from What If...? #36	John Byrne	John Byrne	496	Feb 3, 2026	Fantastic Four #243 cover: 978-1302967673
14	Into the Negative Zone	1982-1983	Fantastic Four #249-264; Fantastic Four Annual #17; Avengers #233; Alpha Flight #4	John Byrne	John Byrne	496	May 4, 2027	Fantastic Four #251 cover: 978-1302971175
17	All in the Family	1986-1987	Fantastic Four #296–307, Annual #20; Fantastic Four vs. the X-Men #1–4	Roger Stern, Steve Englehart, Chris Claremont	John Buscema, Jon Bogdanove, Paul Neary	496	Jan 15, 2014	Fantastic Four #305 cover: 978-0785188650
18	The More Things Change...	1987-1988	Fantastic Four #308–320, Annual #21; Incredible Hulk (vol. 2) #350; Marvel Graphic Novel No. 29 - The Incredible Hulk and the Thing: The Big Change	Jim Starlin, Steve Englehart	Bernie Wrightson, John Buscema, Keith Pollard, Kieron Dwyer	472	Jun 12, 2019	Fantastic Four #318 cover: 978-1302918460
18	The More Things Change...	1987-1988	Fantastic Four #308–320, Annual #21; Incredible Hulk (vol. 2) #350; Marvel Graphic Novel No. 29 - The Incredible Hulk and the Thing: The Big Change	Jim Starlin, Steve Englehart	Bernie Wrightson, John Buscema, Keith Pollard, Kieron Dwyer	472	May 13, 2025	Fantastic Four #318 cover: 978-1302963927
19	The Dream Is Dead	1988-1989	Fantastic Four #321-333, Annual #22; Marvel Graphic Novel No. 49 - Doctor Strange and Doctor Doom: Triumph and Torment	Steve Englehart, Roger Stern	Keith Pollard, Rich Buckler, Mike Mignola	464	Mar 21, 2023	Fantastic Four #326 cover: 978-1302951122
20	Into the Time Stream	1989-1990	Fantastic Four #334–346, Annual #23; material from New Mutants Annual #6, X-Factor Annual #5 and Uncanny X-Men Annual #14	Walt Simonson, Louise Simonson, Chris Claremont	Walt Simonson, Rich Buckler, Arthur Adams	504	Jul 23, 2014	Fantastic Four #337 cover: 978-0785188957
20	Into the Time Stream	1989-1990	Fantastic Four #334–346, Annual #23; material from New Mutants Annual #6, X-Factor Annual #5 and Uncanny X-Men Annual #14	Walt Simonson, Louise Simonson, Chris Claremont	Walt Simonson, Rich Buckler, Arthur Adams	504	Jul 23, 2024	Fantastic Four #337 cover: 978-1302957896
21	The New Fantastic Four	1990-1992	Fantastic Four #347–361, Annual #24; material from Marvel Holiday Special #1	Walt Simonson, Tom DeFalco	Arthur Adams, Paul Ryan	504	Jun 27, 2018	Fantastic Four #349 cover: 978-1302911379
21	The New Fantastic Four	1990-1992	Fantastic Four #347–361, Annual #24; material from Marvel Holiday Special #1	Walt Simonson, Tom DeFalco	Arthur Adams, Paul Ryan	504	Aug 16, 2022	Fantastic Four #349 cover: 978-1302946845
22	This Flame, This Fury	1992-1993	Fantastic Four #362–376, Annual #25-26; Adventures of the Thing #3	Tom DeFalco, Mark Gruenwald	Paul Ryan, Herb Trimpe	496	Nov 9, 2021	Fantastic Four #375 cover: 978-1302932367
23	Nobody Gets Out Alive	1993-1994	Fantastic Four #377-392, Fantastic Four Annual #27; Namor the Sub-Mariner #47-48; Fantastic Four Ashcan Edition #1	Tom DeFalco, Glenn Herdling	Paul Ryan, Geof Isherwood, Mike Gustovich	504	Mar 15, 2022	Fantastic Four #383 cover: 978-1302934477
24	Atlantis Rising	1994-1995	Fantastic Four #393-402; Fantastic Force #7-9; Fantastic Four: Atlantis Rising #1-2; Fantastic Four: Atlantis Rising Collectors' Preview	Tom DeFalco, Glenn Herdling	Paul Ryan, Dante Bastianoni, M. C. Wyman	480	Mar 19, 2024	Fantastic Four #400 cover: 978-1302956394
25	Strange Days	1995-1996	Fantastic Four #403–416; Fantastic Four: The Legend; Onslaught: Marvel Universe; material from Tales of the Marvel Universe (1997)	Tom DeFalco, Mark Waid	Paul Ryan, Carlos Pacheco, Adam Kubert	472	May 27, 2015	Fantastic Four #416 cover: 978-0785192954
26	Heroes Reborn	1996-1997	Fantastic Four (vol. 2) #1-12; Avengers (vol. 2) #12; Iron Man (vol. 2) #12; Captain America (vol. 2) #12; material from Incredible Hulk #450	Jim Lee, Brandon Choi	Jim Lee, Brett Booth, Ron Lim	488	Aug 11, 2026	Fantastic Four (vol. 2) #1 cover: 978-1302969639

=== Generation X ===
Generation X is a team of young mutants, mentored by Banshee and Emma Frost, created after the events of 1994's X-Men event, Phalanx Covenant. That event is reprinted at the beginning of Volume 1: Back To School, before the advent of the ongoing Generation X series.

Compared to the rest of the 1990s X-books, Generation X was pitched differently. "This was a book stripped of all the gimmicks that were so common in the '90s. (Writer Scott Lobdell) understood that the X-Men are essentially the comic book equivalent of a soap opera, and that the real focus should always lie upon the interaction between the team members."

Spine lettering: Blue
#	Subtitle	Years covered	Issues collected	Writers	Artists	Pages	Released	ISBN
1	Back To School	1994-1995	Uncanny X-Men #316-318, X-Men #36-37, Wolverine #94, Generation X #1-9, Generation-X Collectors Preview, Generation-X Ashcan Edition	Scott Lobdell, Fabian Nicieza	Chris Bachalo, Joe Madureira, Andy Kubert, Roger Cruz	480	Jul 14, 2021	Generation X #1 cover: 978-1302930769
2	Emplate's Revenge	1994-1997	Generation X #10-23, Annual '95 and '96; Generation X San Diego Preview #1; material from Incredible Hulk Annual '97	Scott Lobdell, Michael Golden	Tom Grummett, Chris Bachalo, Jeff Johnson	488	May 31, 2022	Generation X #16 cover: 978-1302946494
3	The Secret of M	1997-1998	Generation X #24-32, -1, Annual '97; X-Men Unlimited #16; Marvel Team-Up #1; Daydreamers #1-3; Generation X Underground #1	Scott Lobdell, James Robinson	Jim Mahfood, Chris Bachalo, Martin Egeland	480	Jun 6, 2023	Generation X #29 cover: 978-1302951733
4	Pride and Penance	1997-1999	Generation X #33-47, ½; Generation X/Dracula Annual '98; X-Men Unlimited #20; Generation X Holiday Special #1	Larry Hama, Joseph Harris	Terry Dodson, Alé Garza	496	Sep 10, 2024	Generation X #46 cover: 978-1302956523
5	Family Business	1999-2000	Generation X #48-62; Generation X Annual '99; X-Man #50; New Warriors #5	Jay Faerber	Terry Dodson, Gregg Schigiel, Darick Robertson, Kevin Sharpe	488	Sep 16, 2025	Generation X Annual '99 cover: 978-1302965280
6	Counter X	2000-2001	Generation X #63-75; Chamber #1-4; material from X-Men Unlimited #30, 34	Brian Wood, Warren Ellis, Brian K. Vaughan, Andi Watson & Ken Siu-Chong	Steve Pugh, Allen Evans, Ron Lim, Lee Ferguson, Jim Mahfood & Christina Chen	472	Nov 3, 2026	Generation X #67 cover: 978-1302969738

=== Ghost Rider ===
After a seven-issue run in Marvel Spotlight, the Johnny Blaze version of Ghost Rider got his own ongoing series. The book ran for 11 years, and 81 issues, from 1973 to 1983.

Spine lettering: Orange
#	Subtitle	Years covered	Issues collected	Writers	Artists	Pages	Released	ISBN
1	Hell on Wheels	1972-1975	Marvel Spotlight #5-12; Ghost Rider (vol. 2) #1-11; Marvel Team-Up #15	Gary Friedrich, Tony Isabella	Mike Ploog, Tom Sutton, Jim Mooney	424	May 3, 2022	Ghost Rider (vol. 2) #1 cover: 978-1302946111
2	The Salvation Run	1975-1978	Ghost Rider (vol. 2) #12-28; Marvel Two-in-One #8; Daredevil #138; Marvel Team-Up #58; Marvel Premiere #28; material from Marvel Tales #255	Tony Isabella, Jim Shooter	Frank Robbins, Don Heck	408	Oct 29, 2024	Ghost Rider (vol. 2) #25 cover: 978-1302955496
3	Deathrace	1978-1980	Ghost Rider (vol. 2) #29-50, Marvel Team-Up #91; material from What If? #17 and Marvel Tales #256	Michael Fleisher, Roger McKenzie	Don Perlin	472	Sep 30, 2025	Ghost Rider (vol. 2) #43 cover: 978-1302960575
4	To Slay A Demon	1980-1982	Ghost Rider (vol. 2) #51-66; Marvel Two-In-One #80; Avengers #214; material from What If...? #28	Michael Fleisher	Don Perlin, Jack Sparling	440	Oct 20, 2026	Ghost Rider (vol. 2) #63 cover: 978-1302967451

=== Ghost Rider: Danny Ketch ===
Ghost Rider: Danny Ketch Epic Collection Vol. 1: Vengeance Reborn was originally solicited as Ghost Rider Epic Collection Vol. 6 Vengeance Reborn. The decision to split the line was taken shortly before the book went to print with distributor, Penguin Random House, reflecting the change.

Spine lettering: Orange
#	Subtitle	Years covered	Issues collected	Writers	Artists	Pages	Released	ISBN
1	Vengeance Reborn	1990-1991	Ghost Rider (vol. 3) #1-12; Marc Spector: Moon Knight #25; Doctor Strange, Sorcerer Supreme #28; material from Marvel Comics Presents #64-71	Howard Mackie	Javier Saltares, Mark Texeira, Mark Bagley, Larry Stroman	464	Oct 10, 2023	Ghost Rider (vol. 3) #1 cover: 978-1302954055
2	Bad To The Bone	1991-1992	Ghost Rider (vol. 3) #13-24; Ghost Rider/Wolverine/Punisher: Hearts Of Darkness; Marvel Comics Presents #100; material from Marvel Comics Presents #90-97; Marvel Holiday Special (1991)	Howard Mackie	Mark Texeira, Ron Wagner, John Romita Jr., Guang Yap	472	Dec 1, 2026	Ghost Rider (vol. 3) #15 cover: 978-1302969486
3	Rise of the Midnight Sons	1992-1993	Ghost Rider (vol. 3) #25-31; Ghost Rider/Blaze: Spirits of Vengeance #1-3; X-Men (vol. 2) #9; Morbius: The Living Vampire #1; Darkhold: Pages from the Book of Sins #1; Nightstalkers #1; material from Marvel Comics Presents #101-106	Howard Mackie, Scott Lobdell, Len Kaminski, Christian Cooper, D.G. Chichester	Ron Wagner, Andy Kubert, Adam Kubert, Jim Lee, Richard Case, Ron Garney & Rick Leonardi	496	May 4, 2027	Ghost Rider (vol. 3) #28 cover: 978-1302971861
6	Siege of Darkness	1993-1994	Ghost Rider (vol. 3) #44-45; Ghost Rider/Blaze: Spirits of Vengeance #17-18, and more: Nightstalkers #14-15; Marvel Comics Presents #143-146; Darkhold: Pages from the Book of Sins #15-16; Morbius: the Living Vampire #16-17; Doctor Strange, Sorcerer Supreme #60-61; Midnight Sons Unlimited #4	Howard Mackie, Steven Grant, Chris Cooper, Gregory Wright, Daniel Chichester	Ron Garney, Henry Martinez	496	Apr 1, 2025	Ghost Rider (vol. 3) #45 cover: 978-1302964085

=== Guardians of the Galaxy ===
The 1960s Guardians of the Galaxy are largely separate from the rest of Marvel continuity. Volume 2 includes the first six issues of the characters' first ongoing series, debuting in 1990.

Spine lettering: Yellow
#	Subtitle	Years covered	Issues collected	Writers	Artists	Pages	Released	ISBN
1	Earth Shall Overcome	1969-1977	Marvel Super-Heroes #18, Marvel Two-in-One #4-5, Giant-Size Defenders #5, Defenders #26-29, Marvel Presents #3-12, Thor Annual #6	Steve Gerber, Roger Stern	John Buscema, Al Milgrom, Don Heck	408	Apr 11, 2023	Marvel Presents #10 cover: 978-1302950439
2	Quest for the Shield	1978-1990	Avengers #167-168, 170–177, 181; Ms. Marvel #23; Marvel Team-Up #86; Marvel Two-in-One #61-63, 69; Guardians of the Galaxy #1-6	Jim Shooter, Mark Gruenwald	Jim Valentino, George Perez, David Wenzel	496	Feb 18, 2025	Guardians of the Galaxy #2 cover: 978-1302956417
3	Homecoming	1990-1992	Guardians of the Galaxy #7-20, Annual #1; material from Fantastic Four Annual #24; Thor Annual #16; Silver Surfer Annual #4	Jim Valentino, Al Milgrom, Ron Marz	Jim Valentino, Al Milgrom, Ron Lim	504	Sep 23, 2025	Guardians of the Galaxy Annual #1 cover: 978-1302965181

=== Hawkeye ===
The original Hawkeye Epic Collection has Clint Barton as the superhero archer. Volume 1: The Avenging Archer includes the Mark Gruenwald miniseries, which is "particularly noteworthy for launching Hawkeye's longstanding relationship with Mockingbird, and for being an early exploration of the character's hearing loss and how he comes to deal with that."

Spine lettering: Purple
#	Subtitle	Years covered	Issues collected	Writers	Artists	Pages	Released	ISBN
1	The Avenging Archer	1964-1988	Hawkeye #1-4; Avengers #16, 63–65, 189, 223; Marvel Team-Up #22, 92, 95; Captain America #317; material from Tales of Suspense #57, 60, 64; Marvel Tales #100; Marvel Fanfare #3, 39; Marvel Super Action #1	Stan Lee, Roy Thomas, Mark Gruenwald, Steven Grant	Mark Gruenwald, Gene Colan	432	Jan 11, 2022	Hawkeye #1 cover: 978-1302934484
2	The Way of the Arrow	1987-1989	Solo Avengers #1-20, Avengers Spotlight #21	Tom DeFalco, Howard Mackie	Mark Bright, Ron Lim, Al Milgrom, Ron Wilson	496	Oct 17, 2023	Solo Avengers #7 cover: 978-1302953348
3	Marked for Death	1989-1991	Avengers Spotlight #22-40; material from Marvel Comics Presents #83	Howard Mackie, Dwayne McDuffie, Steve Gerber	Al Milgrom, Dwayne Turner	456	Dec 16, 2025	Avengers Spotlight #22 cover: 978-1302965198
4	Shafted	1994-2008	Hawkeye (vol. 2) #1-4; Hawkeye (vol. 3) #1-8, and more: Hawkeye: Earth's Mightiest Marksman #1; Avengers #502; The Pulse #10; New Avengers #26, 30; Young Avengers Presents #6; material from Marvel Comics Presents #159-161	Chuck Dixon, Fabian Nicieza, Brian Michael Bendis	Scott Kolins, Stefano Raffaele	480	Dec 10, 2024	Hawkeye (vol. 3) #8 cover: 978-1302956516
Jump to: Hawkeye Modern Era Epic Collection

=== Incredible Hulk ===
The Hulk debuted in his own book in 1962. Notable storylines include: Future Imperfect in Volume 20; Wolverine Versus Gray Hulk in Volume 15; and Hulk Versus Juggernaut in Volume 19.

Spine lettering: Green
#	Subtitle	Years covered	Issues collected	Writers	Artists	Pages	Released	ISBN
1	Man or Monster?	1962-1964	Incredible Hulk #1–6; Fantastic Four #12, 25–26; Avengers #1–3, 5; Amazing Spider-Man #14; Tales to Astonish #59; Journey into Mystery #112	Stan Lee	Jack Kirby, Steve Ditko, Dick Ayers	392	Jun 15, 2016	Incredible Hulk #5 cover: 978-0785196006
1	Man or Monster?	1962-1964	Incredible Hulk #1–6; Fantastic Four #12, 25–26; Avengers #1–3, 5; Amazing Spider-Man #14; Tales to Astonish #59; Journey into Mystery #112	Stan Lee	Jack Kirby, Steve Ditko, Dick Ayers	392	Jun 23, 2021	Incredible Hulk #5 cover: 978-1302929749
1	Man or Monster?	1962-1964	Incredible Hulk #1–6; Fantastic Four #12, 25–26; Avengers #1–3, 5; Amazing Spider-Man #14; Tales to Astonish #59; Journey into Mystery #112	Stan Lee	Jack Kirby, Steve Ditko, Dick Ayers	392	Sep 17, 2024	Incredible Hulk #5 cover: 978-1302960438
2	The Hulk Must Die	1964-1967	Tales to Astonish #60–96; material from Not Brand Echh #3	Stan Lee	Steve Ditko, Jack Kirby, Bill Everett, Gil Kane, John Buscema, Marie Severin	432	Oct 25, 2017	Tales to Astonish #79 cover: 978-1302904456
3	The Leader Lives	1967-1969	Tales to Astonish #97–101, Incredible Hulk #102–117, Annual #1; material from Not Brand Echh #9	Stan Lee, Gary Friedrich	Marie Severin, Herb Trimpe	488	Oct 31, 2018	Incredible Hulk #105 cover: 978-1302913137
4	In the Hands of HYDRA	1969-1971	Incredible Hulk #118–137; Marvel Super-Heroes #16	Roy Thomas	Herb Trimpe	440	Sep 25, 2019	Incredible Hulk #119 cover: 978-1302915582
5	Who Will Judge the Hulk?	1971-1972	Incredible Hulk #138-156; Avengers #88	Roy Thomas, Archie Goodwin	Herb Trimpe	448	Jan 19, 2021	Incredible Hulk #139 cover: 978-1302922061
6	Crisis on Counter-Earth	1972-1974	Incredible Hulk #157-178	Steve Englehart, Roy Thomas, Gerry Conway	Herb Trimpe	472	Oct 5, 2021	Incredible Hulk #177 cover: 978-1302929169
7	And Now... The Wolverine	1974-1976	Incredible Hulk #179-200; Incredible Hulk Annual #5	Len Wein	Herb Trimpe, Sal Buscema	472	Oct 4, 2022	Incredible Hulk #200 cover: 978-1302933609
8	The Curing of Dr. Banner	1976-1978	Incredible Hulk #201-226, Annual #6	Len Wein, Roger Stern	Sal Buscema	528	Oct 24, 2023	Incredible Hulk #206 cover: 978-1302948795
9	Kill or Be Killed	1978-1980	Incredible Hulk #227-244, Annual #7-9, Captain America #230	Roger Stern	Sal Buscema	520	Jul 30, 2024	Incredible Hulk #227 cover: 978-1302955366
10	To Hunt the Hulk	1980-1981	Incredible Hulk #245-262; Marvel Treasury Edition #25	Bill Mantlo	Sal Buscema, Herb Trimpe	488	Nov 4, 2025	Incredible Hulk #245 cover: 978-1302960582
11	Devolution	1981-1983	Incredible Hulk #263-279, Annual 10–11; Incredible Hulk vs Quasimodo #1	Bill Mantlo	Sal Buscema	496	May 5, 2026	Incredible Hulk #272 cover: 978-1302967413
12	Unholy Alliance	1983-1984	Incredible Hulk #280-296; Annual #12; Questprobe #1	Bill Mantlo	Sal Buscema	472	Feb 23, 2027	Incredible Hulk #283 cover: 978-1302971151
13	Crossroads	1984-1985	Incredible Hulk #297-313, Incredible Hulk Annual #13, Alpha Flight #29	Bill Mantlo	Sal Buscema, Bret Blevins, Mike Mignola, Alan Kupperberg	488	Apr 19, 2022	Incredible Hulk #312 cover: 978-1302934491
14	Going Gray	1985-1987	Incredible Hulk #314-330, Annual #14-15; material from Marvel Fanfare #29	John Byrne, Al Milgrom, Peter David	John Byrne, Al Milgrom, Steve Geiger, Sal Buscema	512	Dec 15, 2020	Incredible Hulk #326 cover: 978-1302926762
15	Ground Zero	1987-1988	Incredible Hulk #331-346; Marvel Graphic Novel No. 29 - The Incredible Hulk and the Thing: The Big Change	Peter David, Jim Starlin	Todd McFarlane, John Ridgway, Erik Larsen, Berni Wrightson	464	Aug 20, 2024	Incredible Hulk #344 cover: 978-1302956325
16	Joe Fixit	1988-1989	Incredible Hulk #347–363; Web of Spider-Man #44; Fantastic Four 320; material from Marvel Comics Presents 26, 45;	Peter David, Bob Harras, Steve Englehart	Jeff Purves, Dan Reed, Alex Saviuk, Keith Pollard & Herb Trimpe	472	Jan 26, 2027	Incredible Hulk #347 cover: 978-1302969493
19	Ghost of the Past	1992-1993	Incredible Hulk #397–406, Annual #18–19, and more: material from Namor the Sub-Mariner Annual #2, Silver Surfer Annual #5, Doctor Strange, Sorcerer Supreme Annual #2 and Marvel Holiday Special #2	Peter David, Ron Marz	Dale Keown, Jan Duursema, Gary Frank	480	Sep 16, 2015	Incredible Hulk #406 cover: 978-0785192992
20	Future Imperfect	1992-1994	Incredible Hulk #407–419, Annual #20, Ashcan Edition; Incredible Hulk: Future Imperfect #1–2; material from Marvel Holiday Special #3	Peter David	Gary Frank, Paul Pelletier, George Perez, Roger Cruz	504	Jan 4, 2017	Incredible Hulk #418 cover: 978-1302904708
20	Future Imperfect	1992-1994	Incredible Hulk #407–419, Annual #20, Ashcan Edition; Incredible Hulk: Future Imperfect #1–2; material from Marvel Holiday Special #3	Peter David	Gary Frank, Paul Pelletier, George Perez, Roger Cruz	504	Oct 22, 2024	Incredible Hulk #418 cover: 978-1302960445
21	Fall of the Pantheon	1994-1995	Incredible Hulk #420–435; Tales to Astonish (vol. 2) #1; Incredible Hulk vs. Venom #1	Peter David	John Estes, Gary Frank, Darick Robertson, Liam Sharp	496	Jan 10, 2018	Incredible Hulk #424 cover: 978-1302910242
21	Fall of the Pantheon	1994-1995	Incredible Hulk #420–435; Tales to Astonish (vol. 2) #1; Incredible Hulk vs. Venom #1	Peter David	John Estes, Gary Frank, Darick Robertson, Liam Sharp	496	Nov 9, 2022	Incredible Hulk #424 cover: 978-1302946906
22	Ghosts of the Future	1995-1996	Incredible Hulk #436–448; Savage Hulk #1; Cutting Edge #1; Cable #34; Onslaught: Marvel Universe	Peter David, William Messner-Loebs, Mark Waid	Angel Medina, Adam Kubert, Mike Deodato Jr.	504	Jan 16, 2019	Incredible Hulk #447 cover: 978-1302916268
24	The Lone and Level Sands	1998-1999	Incredible Hulk #460-474; Incredible Hulk/Sub-Mariner Annual 1998, X-Man/Hulk Annual 1998	Peter David, Joe Casey	Adam Kubert, David Brewer, Javier Pulido, Ed McGuinness	464	Apr 18, 2023	Incredible Hulk #461 cover: 978-1302951061
Jump to: Hulk Modern Era Epic Collections

=== Iron Fist ===
The first Epic Collection for Iron Fist contains the character's first full 1970s run, before the series was cancelled. Following that, Iron Fist joined Luke Cage in the series Power Man & Iron Fist.

Spine lettering: Green
#	Subtitle	Years covered	Issues collected	Writers	Artists	Pages	Released	ISBN
1	The Fury of Iron Fist	1974-1977	Marvel Premiere #15–25; Iron Fist #1–15; Marvel Team-Up #63–64	Chris Claremont	John Byrne, Larry Hama	528	Jul 8, 2015	Marvel Premiere #22 cover: 978-0785191643
1	The Fury of Iron Fist	1974-1977	Marvel Premiere #15–25; Iron Fist #1–15; Marvel Team-Up #63–64	Chris Claremont	John Byrne, Larry Hama	528	Sep 26, 2018	Marvel Premiere #22 cover: 978-1302912840
1	The Fury of Iron Fist	1974-1977	Marvel Premiere #15–25; Iron Fist #1–15; Marvel Team-Up #63–64	Chris Claremont	John Byrne, Larry Hama	528	Nov 23, 2022	Marvel Premiere #22 cover: 978-1302946883
Jump to: Power Man & Iron Fist Epic Collection

=== Iron Man ===
Iron Man first appeared in Tales of Suspense in 1963, before getting his own series five years later. The character was a founding member of The Avengers in 1963.

Other notable tales include: The Invincible Iron Man across Volume 10: The Enemy Within and Volume 11: Duel Of Iron; plus Armor Wars in Volume 13: Stark Wars.

Spine lettering: Yellow
#	Subtitle	Years covered	Issues collected	Writers	Artists	Pages	Released	ISBN
1	The Golden Avenger	1963-1965	Tales of Suspense #39–72	Stan Lee	Don Heck	520	Oct 29, 2014	Tales of Suspense #52 cover: 978-0785188636
1	The Golden Avenger	1963-1965	Tales of Suspense #39–72	Stan Lee	Don Heck	520	Dec 4, 2019	Tales of Suspense #52 cover: 978-1302924287
2	By Force of Arms	1966-1968	Tales of Suspense #73–99, Tales to Astonish #82, Iron Man and the Sub-Mariner #1, Iron Man #1; material from Not Brand Echh #2	Stan Lee	Gene Colan	416	Jan 25, 2017	Tales of Suspense #97 cover: 978-1302900113
3	The Man Who Killed Tony Stark	1968-1970	Iron Man #2–24	Archie Goodwin	George Tuska	496	Apr 17, 2019	Iron Man #8 cover: 978-1302916305
4	The Fury of the Firebrand	1970-1972	Iron Man #25-46; Daredevil #73	Archie Goodwin, Gerry Conway, Allyn Brodsky	Don Heck, George Tuska	472	Aug 26, 2020	Iron Man #29 cover: 978-1302922078
5	Battle Royal	1972-1974	Iron Man #47-67	Mike Friedrich	George Tuska	448	May 24, 2022	Iron Man #47 cover: 978-1302933616
6	War of the Super Villains	1974-1976	Iron Man #68-91, Annual #3	Mike Friedrich	George Tuska	480	Nov 28, 2023	Iron Man #69 cover: 978-1302948801
7	Ten Rings to Rule the World	1976-1978	Iron Man #92-114, Annual #4; Marvel Premiere #44	Bill Mantlo	George Tuska, Keith Pollard	480	Jun 3, 2025	Iron Man #106 cover: 978-1302960599
8	Demon in a Bottle	1978-1980	Iron Man #115-139	David Michelinie, Bob Layton	Bob Layton, John Romita Jr., Jerry Bingham	480	Sep 1, 2026	Iron Man #118 cover: 978-1302967444
10	The Enemy Within	1982-1983	Iron Man #158–177, Annual #5	Denny O'Neil	Luke McDonnell	504	Sep 18, 2013	Iron Man #164 cover: 978-0785187875
11	Duel of Iron	1983-1985	Iron Man #178–195, Annual #6–7	Denny O'Neil	Luke McDonnell	504	Mar 20, 2016	Iron Man #192 cover: 978-0785195061
12	Iron Monger	1985-1987	Iron Man #196–214, Annual #8	Denny O'Neil	Rich Buckler, Sal Buscema, Herb Trimpe, Mark Bright, Paul Ryan	512	Mar 9, 2027	Iron Man #200 cover: 978-1302972486
13	Stark Wars	1987-1988	Iron Man #215–232, Annual #9	David Michelinie	Bob Layton, Mark Bright, Barry Windsor-Smith	496	Jan 21, 2015	Iron Man #215 cover: 978-0785192909
13	Stark Wars	1987-1988	Iron Man #215–232, Annual #9	David Michelinie	Bob Layton, Mark Bright, Barry Windsor-Smith	496	Jan 21, 2025	Iron Man #215 cover: 978-1302960476
14	Return of the Ghost	1988-1989	Iron Man #233–244; Iron Man: Crash; Marvel Fanfare #22–23 (1985), 44	Mike Saenz, David Michelinie	Bob Layton, Roger McKenzie, Butch Guice, Ken Steacy	480	Mar 13, 2019	Iron Man #244 cover: 978-1302916299
14	Return of the Ghost	1988-1989	Iron Man #233–244; Iron Man: Crash; Marvel Fanfare #22–23 (1985), 44	Mike Saenz, David Michelinie	Bob Layton, Roger McKenzie, Butch Guice, Ken Steacy	480	Dec 13, 2022	Iron Man #244 cover: 978-1302946890
15	Doom	1989-1990	Iron Man #245–257, Annual #10–11; material from Captain America Annual #9	David Michelinie, Bob Layton, Dwayne McDuffie	Bob Layton, Paul Smith, Herb Trimpe	472	Jan 24, 2018	Iron Man #250 cover: 978-1302910136
15	Doom	1989-1990	Iron Man #245–257, Annual #10–11; material from Captain America Annual #9	David Michelinie, Bob Layton, Dwayne McDuffie	Bob Layton, Paul Smith, Herb Trimpe	472	Apr 18, 2023	Iron Man #250 cover: 978-1302950446
16	War Games	1990-1992	Iron Man #258–277	John Byrne	John Romita Jr., Paul Ryan, Mark Bright	504	Mar 19, 2014	Iron Man #258 cover: 978-0785185505
17	War Machine	1991-1993	Iron Man #278-289, Annual #12-13; material from Darkhawk Annual #1, Avengers West Coast Annual #7, Marvel Holiday Special #2	Roy Thomas, Danny Fingeroth, Len Kaminski	Tom Morgan, Paul Ryan, Kevin Hopgood, Gene Colan	488	Apr 8, 2020	Iron Man #286 cover: 978-1302923518
18	The Return of Tony Stark	1993	Iron Man #290-297, Annual #14, Marvel Super-Heroes #13, Iron Manual #1; material from: Marvel Super-Heroes #2 (1990), 8–9 (1991–1992), 12 (1992), 14–15	Len Kaminski, Kurt Busiek, Christopher Priest	Kevin Hopgood, Greg LaRocque	488	Nov 1, 2022	Iron Man #291 cover: 978-1302948191
19	Crash & Burn	1993-1995	Iron Man #298-309, Annual #15, Tales Of Suspense (vol. 2) #1	Len Kaminski, James Robinson	Tom Morgan, Kevin Hopgood, Colin MacNeil	448	Jun 23, 2026	Iron Man #300 cover: 978-1302965297
20	In the Hands of Evil	1994-1995	Iron Man #310-318, War Machine #8-10, Force Works #6-7, Iron Man/Force Works Collectors Preview #1; material from Marvel Comics Presents #169-172	Scott Benson, Len Kaminski, Dan Abnett	Tom Morgan, Dave Taylor, Geoff Senior	496	Nov 23, 2021	Iron Man #314 cover: 978-1302930776
21	The Crossing	1995-1996	Iron Man #319-324; War Machine #20-22; Force Works #16-20; Avengers #390-394; Avengers: The Crossing #1	Bob Harras, Terry Kavanagh, Dan Abnett	Mike Deodato Jr, Heitor Oliveira	512	May 16, 2023	Iron Man #319 cover: 978-1302951597
22	Age of Innocence	1996	Iron Man #325-332; War Machine #23; Avengers: Timeslide #1; Avengers #395-396; Age of Innocence: The Rebirth of Iron Man #1; Onslaught: Marvel Universe; Iron Man: The Legend #1	Dan Abnett, Bob Harras, Terry Kavanagh	Jim Cheung, Hector Collazo, Richard Bennett	488	Oct 1, 2024	Iron Man #332 cover: 978-1302959586
Jump to: Iron Man Modern Era Epic Collection

=== Killraven ===
Jonathan Raven - Killraven - is a freedom fighter who appeared in 22 issues of Amazing Adventures, before the series was cancelled in 1976. Issue #31, collected in Killraven's only Epic Collection, "is notable as the first mainstream comic to feature an interracial kiss".

Spine lettering: Red
#	Subtitle	Years covered	Issues collected	Writers	Artists	Pages	Released	ISBN
1	Warrior of the Worlds	1973-1983	Amazing Adventures #18–39; Marvel Graphic Novel No. 7 - Killraven: Warrior of the Worlds; Marvel Team-Up #45	Don McGregor	Philip Russell, Herb Trimpe	488	Oct 19, 2021	Amazing Adventures #27 cover: 978-1302932169

=== Luke Cage ===
In 1972, Luke Cage became the first Black American superhero to star in his own comic-book series. The book was retitled Luke Cage, Power Man, then simply Power Man from issue #17.

Cage's two Epic Collections contain the full 1970s run for the character as, in an effort to avoid full cancellation for the series in 1977, Cage was paired with Danny Rand in the joint book Power Man & Iron Fist.

Spine lettering: Yellow
#	Subtitle	Years covered	Issues collected	Writers	Artists	Pages	Released	ISBN
1	Retribution	1972-1975	Hero for Hire #1-16, Power Man #17-23	Archie Goodwin, Steve Englehart, Tony Isabella	George Tuska, Billy Graham	480	Feb 16, 2021	Hero for Hire #1 cover: 978-1302928315
2	The Fire This Time	1975-1977	Power Man #24-47, Annual #1	Don McGregor, Marv Wolfman	George Tuska, Lee Elias	472	Feb 13, 2024	Power Man #37 cover: 978-1302955069
Jump to: Power Man & Iron Fist Epic Collection

=== Marvel Two-in-One ===
Marvel Two-in-One features Fantastic Four member, The Thing, teaming up with a different Marvel superhero each issue. Issue #21 is excluded because it features Doc Savage, a licensed character not owned by Marvel Comics.

Spine lettering: Orange
#	Subtitle	Years covered	Issues collected	Writers	Artists	Pages	Released	ISBN
1	Cry Monster	1973-1976	Marvel Two-in-One #1–19; Marvel Feature #11–12; Marvel Team-Up #47	Steve Gerber, Bill Mantlo	Sal Buscema, Ron Wilson	432	Aug 8, 2018	Marvel Feature #11 cover: 978-1302913328
1	Cry Monster	1973-1976	Marvel Two-in-One #1–19; Marvel Feature #11–12; Marvel Team-Up #47	Steve Gerber, Bill Mantlo	Sal Buscema, Ron Wilson	432	Apr 21, 2021	Marvel Feature #11 cover: 978-1302928339
2	Two Against Hydra	1976-1978	Marvel Two-in-One #20, #22-36, Annual #1; Fantastic Four Annual #11	Marv Wolfman, Roy Thomas	John Buscema, Sal Buscema, Ron Wilson	376	Jan 23, 2024	Marvel Two-in-One #26 cover: 978-1302931766
3	Remembrance of Things Past	1977-1979	Marvel Two-in-One #37-52, Annual #2-4; Avengers Annual #7	Marv Wolfman, Jim Starlin	Ron Wilson, Sal Buscema, Alan Kupperberg	440	Jan 28, 2025	Marvel Two-in-One #51 cover: 978-1302955649
4	Project Pegasus	1979-1981	Marvel Two-in-One #53-74	Mark Gruenwald, Ralph Macchio with Marv Wolfman	George Pérez, Ron Wilson, John Byrne & Jerry Bingham with Chic Stone, Michael Netzer & Frank Springer	448	Aug 11, 2026	Marvel Two-in-One #56 cover: 978-1302967437
5	Monster Man	1981-1982	Marvel Two-in-One #75-87, Annual #5-6			400	Jun 8, 2027	Marvel Two-in-One #80 cover: 978-1302971182

=== Master of Kung Fu ===
The Master of Kung Fu Epic Collections showcases the character Shang-Chi, who was born out of the 1970s craze for martial arts content. "Marvel Comics wanted to adapt the television series Kung Fu as a comic book, but with WarnerMedia, the property's owner, also owning Marvel's rival DC Comics, that was never going to happen."

Marvel's own series was popular enough to last until 1983 and issue #125.

Meanwhile, Epic Collection Volume 3: Traitors to the Crown was cancelled due to rights issues.

Spine lettering: Red
#	Subtitle	Years covered	Issues collected	Writers	Artists	Pages	Released	ISBN
1	Weapon of the Soul	1973-1975	Special Marvel Edition #15–16, Master of Kung Fu #17–28, Giant-Size Master of Kung Fu #1–4, Giant-Size Spider-Man #2; material from Iron Man Annual #4	Steve Englehart, Doug Moench	Jim Starlin, Paul Gulacy	480	Mar 14, 2018	Special Marvel Edition #15 cover: 978-1302901356
2	Fight Without Pity	1975-1977	Master of Kung Fu #29–53; Annual #1	Doug Moench	Paul Gulacy	496	Jun 26, 2019	Master of Kung Fu #39 cover: 978-1302901363
3	Traitors to the Crown	1977-1979	Master of Kung Fu #54–79	Doug Moench	Mike Zeck, Jim Craig, Pat Broderick	480	Cancelled	Master of Kung Fu #58 cover:978-1302901370

=== Micronauts ===
Based on a Mego Corporation toy line, the Micronauts comics were produced by Marvel between 1979 and 1986. Marvel re-acquired the publishing rights in 2023. The series is complete with five volumes.

Spine lettering: Light blue
The Original Marvel Years
#	Subtitle	Years covered	Issues collected	Writers	Artists	Pages	Released	ISBN
1	They Came from Inner Space	1979-1980	The Micronauts #1-20, Annual #1	Bill Mantlo	Michael Golden, Howard Chaykin	456	Jul 8, 2025	Micronauts #2 cover: 978-1302960612
2	Home Sweet Homeworld	1980-1981	The Micronauts #21-35, Annual #2, and material from Marvel Preview #4 (1976), #7 (1976)	Bill Mantlo	Pat Broderick	464	Sep 9, 2025	Micronauts #35 cover: 978-1302960605
3	This Battlefield, Earth	1981-1983	The Micronauts #36-50	Bill Mantlo	Gil Kane, Butch Guice	488	Nov 11, 2025	Micronauts #48 cover: 978-1302960629
4	The Long and Winding Road	1983-1984	The Micronauts #51-59	Bill Mantlo	Butch Guice	344	Feb 24, 2026	Micronauts #58 cover: 978-1302967406
5	The New Voyages	1984-1986	The Micronauts: The New Voyages #1-20	Peter B. Gillis	Kelley Jones	488	May 26, 2026	The Micronauts: The New Voyages #2 cover: 978-1302967420

=== Moon Knight ===
The character of Moon Knight debuted as a villain in 1975's Werewolf By Night, though by his appearance in Peter Parker, the Spectacular Spider-Man #22, he was seen as more heroic.

Notable storylines include writer Doug Moench's run in Vol. 2: Shadows of the Moon; and the introduction of Midnight Man in the first Epic Collection.

Spine lettering: Grey
#	Subtitle	Years covered	Issues collected	Writers	Artists	Pages	Released	ISBN
1	Bad Moon Rising	1975-1981	Werewolf by Night #32–33, Marvel Spotlight #28–29, Defenders #47–50, Peter Parker, the Spectacular Spider-Man #22–23, Marvel Two-in-One #52, Moon Knight #1–4; material from The Hulk! #11–15, 17–18, 20, Marvel Preview #21	Doug Moench, David Anthony Kraft, Bill Mantlo	Don Perlin, Keith Giffen, Bill Sienkiewicz	504	Oct 1, 2014	Marvel Spotlight #28 cover: 978-0785190967
1	Bad Moon Rising	1975-1981	Werewolf by Night #32–33, Marvel Spotlight #28–29, Defenders #47–50, Peter Parker, the Spectacular Spider-Man #22–23, Marvel Two-in-One #52, Moon Knight #1–4; material from The Hulk! #11–15, 17–18, 20, Marvel Preview #21	Doug Moench, David Anthony Kraft, Bill Mantlo	Don Perlin, Keith Giffen, Bill Sienkiewicz	504	Jun 16, 2021	Marvel Spotlight #28 cover: 978-1302929855
2	Shadows of the Moon	1981-1982	Moon Knight #5–23	Doug Moench, Jack Harris	Bill Sienkiewicz, Denys Cowan	512	21 Oct 2015	Moon Knight #8 cover: 978-0785198109
2	Shadows of the Moon	1981-1982	Moon Knight #5–23	Doug Moench, Jack Harris	Bill Sienkiewicz, Denys Cowan	512	Jan 4, 2022	Moon Knight #8 cover: 978-1302933685
3	Final Rest	1982-1984	Moon Knight #24–38	Doug Moench, Alan Zelenetz, Tony Isabella	Bill Sienkiewicz, Kevin Nowlan, Bo Hampton	488	Dec 19, 2018	Moon Knight #26 cover: 978-1302915643
3	Final Rest	1982-1984	Moon Knight #24–38	Doug Moench, Alan Zelenetz, Tony Isabella	Bill Sienkiewicz, Kevin Nowlan, Bo Hampton	488	Feb 15, 2022	Moon Knight #26 cover: 978-1302933791
4	Butcher's Moon	1984-1990	Moon Knight (vol. 2) #1-6, Marvel Team-Up #144, Marvel Fanfare #30, Marc Spector: Moon Knight #1-7; material from: Solo Avengers #3, Marvel Fanfare #38-39, Marvel Super-Heroes #1	Alan Zelenetz, Jo Duffy, Chuck Dixon	Chris Warner, Sal Velluto	456	Sep 20, 2022	Moon Knight (vol. 2) #6 cover: 978-1302948160
5	The Trial of Marc Spector	1989-1991	Marc Spector: Moon Knight #8-25; material from Punisher Annual #2	Mike Baron, Chuck Dixon, Howard Mackie	Bill Reinhold, Sal Velluto, Mark Bagley	472	Oct 8, 2024	Marc Spector: Moon Knight #25 cover: 978-1302959593
6	Scarlet Redemption	1991-1992	Marc Spector: Moon Knight #26-38; Amazing Spider-Man #353-358	J.M. DeMatteis, Al Milgrom, Terry Kavanagh	Ron Garney, Mark Bagley	456	Oct 21, 2025	Marc Spector: Moon Knight #31 cover: 978-1302965204
7	Death Watch	1992-1994	Marc Spector: Moon Knight #39-51, Moon Knight: Divided We Fall #1, Moon Knight Special #1, Web of Spider-Man #93-94; material from Marvel Comics Presents #152-154	Terry Kavanagh	Denys Cowan, Gary Kwapisz, James Fry, Kelley Jones	496	Oct 24, 2023	Marc Spector: Moon Knight #39 cover: 978-1302953805
8	The Resurrection War	1993-1999	Marc Spector: Moon Knight #52-60; Moon Knight (vol. 3) #1-4; Moon Knight (vol. 4) #1-4; Black Panther (vol. 3) #20-22	Terry Kavanagh, Doug Moench	Stephen Platt, Tommy Lee Edwards, Mark Texeira	488	Oct 20, 2026	Moon Knight (vol. 3) #1 cover: 978-1302969509

=== Morbius ===
Morbius The Living Vampire first appeared in The Amazing Spider-Man #101 from 1971, which is also collected The Amazing Spider-Man Epic Collection #6: The Death Of Captain Stacy.

Both Morbius Epic Collections were released ahead of the 2022 Morbius film.

Spine lettering: White
#	Subtitle	Years covered	Issues collected	Writers	Artists	Pages	Released	ISBN
1	The Living Vampire	1971-1975	Amazing Spider-Man #101–102, Marvel Team-Up #3–4, Giant-Size Super-Heroes #1; Adventure Into Fear #20-26; material from Vampire Tales #1-8, Giant-Size Werewolf #4	Steve Gerber, Don McGregor	Gill Kane, Rick Buckler, Pablo Maros	432	Feb 23, 2021	Adventure Into Fear #24 cover: 978-1302928353
2	The End of a Living Vampire	1975-1981	Adventure Into Fear #27-31, Marvel Premiere #28, Marvel Two-in-One #15, Peter Parker, the Spectacular Spider-Man #6-8, 38, Savage She-Hulk #9-12; material from Vampire Tales #9-11, Annual #1, Marvel Preview #8	Doug Moench, Bill Mantlo, David Kraft	Sonny Trinidad, Sal Buscema, Mike Vosburg	400	May 25, 2021	Adventure Into Fear #31 cover: 978-1302928346

=== Ms. Marvel ===
The Carol Danvers version of Ms. Marvel first appears in #1 of her own self-titled series in 1977. Many of her appearances are reprinted through Avengers Epic Collections, however her most notable storyline, involving pregnancy and alcoholism, from Avengers #200, appears in Volume 2: The Woman Who Fell to Earth.

Spine lettering: Blue
#	Subtitle	Years covered	Issues collected	Writers	Artists	Pages	Released	ISBN
1	This Woman, This Warrior	1977-1978	Ms. Marvel #1–14; Marvel Team-Up #61–62; Defenders #57	Chris Claremont, Gerry Conway	Jim Mooney, John Buscema, Sal Buscema	312	Jan 9, 2019	Ms. Marvel #10 cover: 978-1302916398
2	The Woman Who Fell to Earth	1978-1981	Ms. Marvel #15–23, Marvel Team-Up #76–77, Marvel Two-in-One #51, Avengers #200, Annual #10; material from Avengers #197–199, Marvel Fanfare #24 (1986), Marvel Super-Heroes #10–11 (1992)	Chris Claremont	Jim Mooney, Mike Vosburg	376	May 1, 2019	Ms. Marvel #20 cover: 978-1302918026

=== Namor the Sub-Mariner ===
As a character, Namor "traces so far back that the character was established before Marvel Comics even existed". His first comics appearance in 1939 "was included in Marvel Comics #1, the first publication by Timely Comics, the company that would evolve into Marvel Comics."

None of Namor's Golden Age appearances which ran from Marvel Comics #1 (October 1939) through to Sub-Mariner #42 (October 1955) have been collected. The Epic Collection consists of his Silver Age appearances starting with Fantastic Four #4, his shared series in Tales to Astonish, and his own series Sub-Mariner, launched in 1968.

Spine lettering: Turquoise
#	Subtitle	Years covered	Issues collected	Writers	Artists	Pages	Released	ISBN
1	Enter The Sub-Mariner	1962-1966	Fantastic Four #4, 6, 9, 14, 27, 33, Annual #1, Avengers #3-4, X-Men #6, Daredevil #7, Strange Tales #107, 125, Tales to Astonish #70-76	Stan Lee	Jack Kirby, Gene Colan	408	Apr 7, 2021	Tales to Astonish #76 cover: 978-1302928360
2	Destiny or Death	1966-1968	Tales to Astonish #77-101; Iron Man and Sub-Mariner #1; Sub-Mariner #1-3; material from Not Brand Echh 1, 4, 9, 11	Stan Lee & Roy Thomas with Archie Goodwin, Raymond Marais, Gary Friedrich & Arnold Drake	Gene Colan, Bill Everett & John Buscema with Marie Severin, Dan Adkins, Werner Roth, Jack Kirby, Jerry Grandenetti, Tom Sutton & Ross Andru	480	Jan 5, 2027	Tales to Astonish #100 cover: 978-1302967468
3	Who Strikes for Atlantis?	1968-1970	Sub-Mariner #4-27	Roy Thomas	Marie Severin, John Buscema	512	Feb 21, 2023	Sub-Mariner #25 cover: 978-1302949747
4	Titans Three	1970-1972	Sub-Mariner #28-49, Daredevil #77; material from Ka-Zar #1	Roy Thomas, Gerry Conway	Sal Buscema, Gene Colan	512	Aug 27, 2024	Sub-Mariner #31 cover: 978-1302955397
5	The Invasion of New York	1972-1974	Sub-Mariner #50-72; Marvel Spotlight #27	Bill Everett, Steve Gerber	Bill Everett, Don Heck	496	Dec 2, 2025	Sub-Mariner #69 cover: 978-1302960636

=== New Mutants ===
Vol. 2: The Demon Bear Saga contains art from Bill Sienkiewicz "who made New Mutants one of the most visually bold series of the 80s". Sienkiewicz "preferred to push the boundaries of what was considered acceptable for the superhero comic book medium".

Other notable storylines include "We Were Only Foolin", issue #45, which is collected in Vol. 4: Fallen Angels; and the elevation of Magneto to headmaster in issue #35, from Vol. 3: Asgardian Wars.

The first appearance of Deadpool is in issue #98, and, after issue #100, both of which are republished in Vol. 8: The End of the Beginning, the story continues with the X-Force Epic Collection.

Spine lettering: Blue
#	Subtitle	Years covered	Issues collected	Writers	Artists	Pages	Released	ISBN
1	Renewal	1980-1984	Marvel Graphic Novel No. 4 - The New Mutants, The New Mutants #1–12, Uncanny X-Men #167, Marvel Team-Up Annual #6, Magik #1–4; material from Marvel Team-Up #100	Chris Claremont	Bob McLeod, Sal Buscema, Ron Frenz, John Buscema	520	Mar 8, 2017	Marvel Graphic Novel #4 cover: 978-1302903657
1	Renewal	1980-1984	Marvel Graphic Novel No. 4 - The New Mutants, The New Mutants #1–12, Uncanny X-Men #167, Marvel Team-Up Annual #6, Magik #1–4; material from Marvel Team-Up #100	Chris Claremont	Bob McLeod, Sal Buscema, Ron Frenz, John Buscema	520	Mar 18, 2020	Marvel Graphic Novel #4 cover: 978-1302925772
2	The Demon Bear Saga	1984-1985	The New Mutants #13–31, Annual #1	Chris Claremont	Bill Sienkiewicz, Sal Buscema, Bob McLeod	512	Jul 10, 2019	New Mutants #24 cover: 978-1302918422
2	The Demon Bear Saga	1984-1985	The New Mutants #13–31, Annual #1	Chris Claremont	Bill Sienkiewicz, Sal Buscema, Bob McLeod	512	Jan 1, 2020	New Mutants #24 cover: 978-1302924539
2	The Demon Bear Saga	1984-1985	The New Mutants #13–31, Annual #1	Chris Claremont	Bill Sienkiewicz, Sal Buscema, Bob McLeod	512	Oct 10, 2023	New Mutants #24 cover: 978-1302950552
3	Asgardian Wars	1985-1986	The New Mutants #32-44, Annual #2; New Mutants Special Edition #1; Uncanny X-Men Annual #9	Chris Claremont	Steve Leialoha, Arthur Adams, Mary Wilshire, Butch Guice	512	Jun 27, 2023	New Mutants #37 cover: 978-1302951627
4	Fallen Angels	1986-1987	The New Mutants #45-54, Annual #3; Fallen Angels #1-8	Chris Claremont, Jo Duffy	Butch Guice, Kerry Gammill, Joe Staton	496	Feb 25, 2025	Fallen Angels #1 cover: 978-1302956653
5	Sudden Death	1987-1988	The New Mutants #55–70, Annual #4	Louise Simonson	Bret Blevins, June Brigman, John Muth, Bo Hampton, Terry Shoemaker	464	Aug 4, 2021	New Mutants #65 cover: 978-1302930844
6	Curse of the Valkyries	1988-1990	X-Terminators #1–4; The New Mutants #71–85	Louise Simonson, Chris Claremont	Bret Blevins, Rich Buckler, Terry Shoemaker	496	Feb 28, 2018	New Mutants #77 cover: 978-1302910174
7	Cable	1989-1990	The New Mutants #86-94, Annual #5-6, The New Mutants Summer Special #1; material from X-Factor Annual #5 and Uncanny X-Men Annual #14	Louise Simonson, Ann Nocenti	Rob Liefeld, Jon Bogdanove, Arthur Adams, Bret Blevins	496	Oct 13, 2020	New Mutants #90 cover: 978-1302925239
8	The End of the Beginning	1990-1991	The New Mutants #95-100, Annual #7, Uncanny X-Men #270-272; X-Factor #60-62; material from New Warriors Annual #1; Uncanny X-Men Annual #15; X-Factor Annual #6	Louise Simonson, Chris Claremont, Fabian Nicieza	Rob Liefeld, Jim Lee, Jon Bogdanove	504	Jul 20, 2022	New Mutants #99 cover: 978-1302946647
Jump to: X-Force Epic Collection

=== Planet of the Apes Adventures ===
Following Fox's sale to Disney in 2020, Marvel Comics reacquired a series of publishing rights, including Alien, Predator, and Planet of the Apes.

As well as releasing new Planet of the Apes material, Marvel's Epic Collection has republished full-color comics initially produced in 1975. The first Planet of the Apes book is so far the smallest in the Epic Collection at just 224 pages. It re-tells the 1968 film storyline, and the 1970 sequel.

Spine lettering: White
#	Subtitle	Years covered	Issues collected	Writers	Artists	Pages	Released	ISBN
1	The Original Marvel Years	1975-1976	Adventures on the Planet of the Apes #1-11	Doug Moench	George Tuska, Alfredo Alcala	224	May 14, 2024	Planet of the Apes Adventures Omnibus cover: 978-1302959999

=== Power Man & Iron Fist ===
In an effort to avoid cancellation for the separate Iron Fist and Luke Cage books, Marvel created Power Man & Iron Fist in 1977. The Epic Collection contains almost the full series until its 1986 cancellation. The missing issue 73 is collected within Rom: Spaceknight volume 2: The Original Marvel Years.

Spine lettering: Yellow
#	Subtitle	Years covered	Issues collected	Writers	Artists	Pages	Released	ISBN
Jump to: Iron Fist Epic Collection
Jump to: Luke Cage Epic Collection
1	Heroes for Hire	1977-1981	Power Man #48–49; Power Man and Iron Fist #50–70	Jo Duffy, Chris Claremont	Kerry Gammill, John Byrne, Trevor Von Eeden	448	Aug 5, 2015	Power Man and Iron Fist #50 cover: 978-0785192961
1	Heroes for Hire	1977-1981	Power Man #48–49; Power Man and Iron Fist #50–70	Jo Duffy, Chris Claremont	Kerry Gammill, John Byrne, Trevor Von Eeden	448	Jun 2, 2021	Power Man and Iron Fist #50 cover: 978-1302929879
2	Revenge!	1981-1983	Power Man and Iron Fist #71–72, 74–89; Daredevil #178	Jo Duffy, Dennis O'Neil, Frank Miller	Kerry Gammill, Denys Cowan, Keith Pollard, Frank Miller	472	Oct 5, 2016	Power Man and Iron Fist #83 cover: 978-1302900137
3	Doombringer	1983-1984	Power Man and Iron Fist #90–107	Steven Grant, Archie Goodwin	Denys Cowan, Greg Larocque, Geof Isherwood	440	Nov 20, 2019	Power Man and Iron Fist #95 cover: 978-1302920715
4	Hardball	1984-1986	Power Man and Iron Fist #108-125	Christopher Priest, Alan Rowlands, Tony Isabella	Greg LaRocque, Mark Bright	464	Oct 25, 2022	Power Man and Iron Fist #125 cover: 978-1302945923

=== Punisher ===
Punisher was first an antagonist in Amazing Spider-Man #129 from 1974. The character got his own miniseries in 1986, before a full ongoing a year later.

Notable storylines collected as an Epic Collection include: the Circle of Blood miniseries and a crossover spanning Punisher #10 and Daredevil #257 - both contained within Volume 2: Circle of Blood.

Spine lettering: Black, with white outline
#	Subtitle	Years covered	Issues collected	Writers	Artists	Pages	Released	ISBN
1	The Punisher Strikes	1974-1983	Amazing Spider-Man #129, 134-135, 161-162, 174-175, 201-202, Annual 15; Giant-Size Spider-Man #4; Captain America #241; Daredevil #183-184; Peter Parker, The Spectacular Spider-Man #81-83; material from Marvel Preview #2 and Marvel Super Action #1	Gerry Conway, Marv Wolfman, Dennis O’Neill, Mike Barr, Roger McKenzie, Frank Miller, Bill Mantlo & Archie Goodwin	Ross Andru, Keith Pollard, Frank Miller, Frank Springer, Al Milgrom, Greg LaRocque & Tony DeZuniga	488	Mar 2, 2027	Amazing Spider-Man #129 cover: 978-1302972493
2	Circle of Blood	1986-1988	The Punisher (vol. 1) #1–5; The Punisher (vol. 2) #1–10; Daredevil #257; Marvel Graphic Novel No. 40 - The Punisher: Assassin's Guild	Steven Grant, Jo Duffy, Mike Baron	Mike Zeck, Whilce Portacio	504	Dec 12, 2018	Punisher Vol. 1 #3 cover: 978-1302914073
2	Circle of Blood	1986-1988	The Punisher (vol. 1) #1–5; The Punisher (vol. 2) #1–10; Daredevil #257; Marvel Graphic Novel No. 40 - The Punisher: Assassin's Guild	Steven Grant, Jo Duffy, Mike Baron	Mike Zeck, Whilce Portacio	504	Jun 13, 2023	Punisher Vol. 1 #3 cover: 978-1302950477
3	Kingpin Rules	1988-1989	The Punisher (vol. 2) #11–25, Annual #1–2	Mike Baron, Roger Salick	Mark Texeira, Whilce Portacio, Erik Larsen, Bill Reinhold	496	Feb 6, 2019	Punisher Vol. 2 #17 cover: 978-1302916411
4	Return to Big Nothing	1989-1990	The Punisher (vol. 2) #26–34, Annual #3, Classic Punisher #1, Epic Graphic Novel: Return to Big Nothing, Marvel Graphic Novel No. 51 - The Punisher: Intruder, Marvel Graphic Novel No. 64 - The Punisher: Kingdom Gone	Steven Grant, Mike Baron, Chuck Dixon	Mike Zeck, Bill Reinhold, Jorge Zaffino	480	Jul 21, 2021	Marvel Graphic Novel - The Punisher: Intruder cover: 978-1302930851
5	Jigsaw Puzzle	1990-1991	The Punisher (vol. 2) #35-48, Annual #4; Punisher: No Escape; Punisher: The Prize	Mike Baron, Chris Henderson	Cam Smith, Bill Reinhold, Mark Texeira, Mike Harris	496	Feb 5, 2020	Punisher: No Escape #1 cover: 978-1302922757
7	Capital Punishment	1992-1993	The Punisher (vol. 2) #63–75; Punisher: G-Force; Punisher: Die Hard in the Big Easy; Marvel Graphic Novel No. 74 - Punisher/Black Widow: Spinning Doomsday's Web	Dan Abnett, Andy Lanning, Daniel Chichester	Doug Braithwaite, Larry Stroman	488	Dec 6, 2017	Punisher Vol. 2 #64 cover: 978-1302907846
8	Survival	1992-1994	The Punisher (vol. 2) #76–84, Annual #5-6; Spider-Man/Punisher/Sabretooth: Designer Genes; Punisher: A Man Named Frank	Steven Grant, Chuck Dixon, Val Mayerik	Val Mayerik, Dave Hoover, Hugh Haynes	456	Mar 10, 2026	Punisher Annual #5 cover: 978-1302968434

=== Rom: Spaceknight ===
Marvel's original 1979 comic, Rom: Spaceknight, ran for seven years and was based on a toy line. IDW Publishing produced Rom comics from 2016, before Marvel regained the license in 2023. Even though the series includes licensed characters, stories take place in Marvel's main Earth-616 universe. In the first two Epic Collections, there are appearances from the X-Men, Power Man and Iron Fist, plus The Brotherhood of Mutants.

Spine lettering: Red
#	Subtitle	Years covered	Issues collected	Writers	Artists	Pages	Released	ISBN
1	The Original Marvel Years	1979-1981	Rom #1-20	Bill Mantlo	Sal Buscema	432	Apr 8, 2025	Rom #1 cover: 978-1302961084
2	The Original Marvel Years	1981-1982	Rom #21-33, Annual #1; Power Man And Iron Fist #73	Bill Mantlo, Jo Duffy, Steven Grant	Sal Buscema, Greg LaRocque, Pat Broderick	384	Aug 5, 2025	Rom #25 cover: 978-1302961091
3	The Original Marvel Years	1982-1983	Rom #34-47, Annual #2; Marvel Two-In-One #99	Bill Mantlo	Sal Buscema, Bob Hall	408	Dec 23, 2025	Rom Annual #2 cover: 978-1302961107
4	The Original Marvel Years	1983-1984	Rom #48-60, Annual #3; Incredible Hulk #296	Bill Mantlo	Sal Buscema, Mark Bright, Steve Ditko, William Johnson	408	Apr 7, 2026	Rom Annual #3 cover: 978-1302966911
5	The Original Marvel Years	1984-1986	Rom #61-75, Annual #4	Bill Mantlo	Steve Ditko	432	Aug 4, 2026	Rom #66 cover: 978-1302966928

=== Sgt Fury ===
Nick Fury and his early tales, in the war comic genre, are collected as Sgt. Fury.

Spine lettering: Olive green
#	Subtitle	Years covered	Issues collected	Writers	Artists	Pages	Released	ISBN
1	The Howling Commandos	1963-1965	Sgt. Fury And His Howling Commandos #1–19	Stan Lee	Jack Kirby, Dick Ayers	448	Mar 13, 2019	Sgt. Fury #1 cover: 978-1302916572
2	Berlin Breakout	1965-1966	Sgt. Fury And His Howling Commandos #20-36, Annual #1-2	Stan Lee, Roy Thomas	Dick Ayers	416	May 30, 2023	Sgt. Fury #20 cover: 978-1302952549

=== She-Hulk ===
She-Hulk was "the last major character Stan Lee co-created for Marvel", with Jennifer Walters as the estranged cousin of Bruce Banner. The series was revolutionary in the way it consistently broke the fourth wall.

Spine lettering: Green
#	Subtitle	Years covered	Issues collected	Writers	Artists	Pages	Released	ISBN
3	Breaking the Fourth Wall	1989-1990	Sensational She-Hulk #1-12; She-Hulk Ceremony #1-2; material from Solo Avengers #14; Marvel Comics Presents #18; Marvel Fanfare #48	John Byrne, Steve Gerber, Dwayne McDuffie	John Byrne, Bryan Hitch, June Brigman	448	May 3, 2022	Sensational She-Hulk #6 cover: 978-1302945916
4	The Cosmic Squish Principle	1990-1991	Sensational She-Hulk #13-30; material from Marvel Super-Heroes #5	Steve Gerber, Simon Furman, Louise Simonson	Bryan Hitch, Tom Artis, Tom Morgan	448	May 23, 2023	Sensational She-Hulk #15 cover: 978-1302951634
5	Interrupted Melody	1991-1993	Sensational She-Hulk #31-50	John Byrne, Simon Furman	John Byrne, Rik Levins	488	Dec 22, 2026	978-1302969516
6	To Die and Live in L.A.	1993-2002	Sensational She-Hulk #51-60; Doc Samson #1-4; Incredible Hulk #441-442; Thing & She-Hulk: The Long Night; material from Marvel Comics Presents #123-126; Incredible Hulk #412	Scott Benson, Michael Eury, Peter David, Dan Slott	Pat Olliffe, Paco Medina	480	Jul 23, 2024	Sensational She-Hulk #60 cover: 978-1302956691

=== Silver Surfer ===
The Silver Surfer first appeared in Fantastic Four #48, where he saved the Earth and was exiled as a result.

Notable storylines include Rebirth of Thanos, split between Vol. 5: The Return of Thanos and Vol. 6: Thanos Quest; Freedom in Vol. 3; and Parable in Vol. 4.

Spine lettering: Silver
#	Subtitle	Years covered	Issues collected	Writers	Artists	Pages	Released	ISBN
1	When Calls Galactus	1966-1968	Fantastic Four #48–50, 55, 57–60, 72, 74–77; material from Tales to Astonish #92–93, Fantastic Four #56, 61, Annual #5	Stan Lee	Jack Kirby	320	Nov 19, 2014	Fantastic Four #72 cover: 978-0785190028
1	When Calls Galactus	1966-1968	Fantastic Four #48–50, 55, 57–60, 72, 74–77; material from Tales to Astonish #92–93, Fantastic Four #56, 61, Annual #5	Stan Lee	Jack Kirby	320	Dec 4, 2019	Fantastic Four #72 cover: 978-1302924270
3	Freedom	1980-1990	Silver Surfer (vol. 2) #1, Silver Surfer (vol. 3) #1–14, Super-Villain Classics #1; material from Epic Illustrated #1, Marvel Fanfare #51	Stan Lee, Steve Englehart	John Byrne, Marshall Rogers, Joe Staton, John Buscema	488	Nov 18, 2015	Silver Surfer (vol. 3) #1 cover: 978-0785199038
3	Freedom	1980-1990	Silver Surfer (vol. 2) #1, Silver Surfer (vol. 3) #1–14, Super-Villain Classics #1; material from Epic Illustrated #1, Marvel Fanfare #51	Stan Lee, Steve Englehart	John Byrne, Marshall Rogers, Joe Staton, John Buscema	488	Jul 16, 2024	Silver Surfer (vol. 3) #1 cover: 978-1302957926
4	Parable	1988-1989	Silver Surfer (vol. 3) #15–23, Silver Surfer Annual #1-2; Fantastic Four #325; Marvel Graphic Novel No. 38 - Silver Surfer: Judgment Day; The Silver Surfer: Parable #1-2; material from Marvel Comics Presents #1	Steve Englehart, Stan Lee	Ron Lim, John Buscema, Moebius (Jean Giraud)	504	Jun 21, 2022	Silver Surfer (vol. 3) #18 cover: 978-1302932329
5	The Return of Thanos	1989-1990	Silver Surfer (vol. 3) #24-38, Silver Surfer: The Enslavers	Steve Englehart, Jim Starlin, Stan Lee	Ron Lim, Keith Pollard	480	Jan 31, 2023	Silver Surfer (vol. 3) #34 cover: 978-1302948290
6	Thanos Quest	1990-1991	Silver Surfer (vol. 3) #39–50, Annual #3; Thanos Quest #1–2; material from Marvel Comics Presents #50	Jim Starlin, Ron Marz, Alan Grant	Ron Lim, Jim Sherman	480	Jun 12, 2018	Silver Surfer (vol. 3) #50 cover: 978-1302911867
7	The Infinity Gauntlet	1991-1992	Silver Surfer (vol. 3) #51–66, Annual #4; material from Marvel Comics Presents #69, 93–97	Ron Marz, Susan Kennedy	Ron Lim, Gavin Curtis, Todd Smith, Tom Raney	488	May 24, 2017	Silver Surfer (vol. 3) #56 cover: 978-1302907112
8	The Herald Ordeal	1991-1992	Silver Surfer (vol. 3) #67-75, Annual #5; Silver Surfer: Homecoming; material from Incredible Hulk Annual #18, Namor, the Sub-Mariner Annual #2, Doctor Strange, Sorcerer Supreme Annual #2	Jim Starlin, Ron Marz	Bill Reinhold, Ron Lim, M.C. Wyman, Kevin West	456	Dec 3, 2024	Silver Surfer (vol. 3) #74 cover: 978-1302959654
9	Resurrection	1993	Silver Surfer (vol. 3) #76-85, Annual #6, Secret Defenders #9-10, Silver Surfer/Warlock: Resurrection #1-4	Ron Marz, Jim Starlin	Ron Lim, Tom Grindberg, Joe Phillips, Cully Hamner, Ernie Stiner	456	Sep 9, 2020	Silver Surfer (vol. 3) #83 cover: 978-1302925079
11	Temptation	1994-1995	Silver Surfer (vol. 3) #93–110; material from Cosmic Powers Unlimited (1995) #1	Ron Marz, Michael Jan Friedman, Glenn Greenberg, Mike Lackey	Bart Sears, Tom Grindberg, Scot Eaton, Jim Hall, Joe Phillips, Tom Morgan, John Buscema, Scott Benefiel, Steve Carr	488	Jan 12, 2027	Silver Surfer (vol. 3) #109 cover: 978-1302969769
12	Into the Outer Void	1995-1996	Silver Surfer (vol. 3) #111-122, Silver Surfer: Dangerous Artifacts, Silver Surfer Ashcan, Spider-Man Team-Up #2; material from X-Men Unlimited #13, Marvel Holiday Special 1996	George Perez, Ron Marz	Tom Grindberg, Scot Eaton, Claudio Castellini	448	Jun 24, 2025	Silver Surfer (vol. 3) #118 cover: 978-1302964443
13	Inner Demons	1996-1998	Silver Surfer (vol. 3) #123–138, -1, Annual '97	J.M. DeMatteis, Tom DeFalco, Ron Garney	Val Semeiks, Paul Pelletier, Tom Grummett	464	May 22, 2019	Silver Surfer (vol. 3) #128 cover: 978-1302918132
14	Sun Rise and Shadow Fall	1998-2000	Silver Surfer (vol. 3) #½, 139–146, Silver Surfer/Thor Annual '98, Galactus the Devourer #1-6, Silver Surfer: Loftier Than Mortals #1-2	Tom DeFalco, J.M. DeMatteis, Louise Simonson	John Muth, John Buscema	488	Dec 26, 2023	Silver Surfer: Loftier Than Mortals #2 cover: 978-1302953355

=== Star Wars (Legends) ===
Marvel's first 1977 comic was a six-issue adaptation of the original film. The series ran for 107 issues and three Annuals until 1986, featuring stories set between the original trilogy of films, as well as adaptations of The Empire Strikes Back and Return of the Jedi. Rights briefly went to Blackthorne Publishing, before being acquired by Dark Horse Comics. The company produced over 100 Star Wars titles until 2014.

Following the October 2012 acquisition of Lucasfilm by Disney, it was announced that the Star Wars comics license would return to Marvel Comics in 2015.

In April 2014, Lucasfilm rebranded the majority of the Star Wars Expanded Universe as Legends, only keeping the theatrical Skywalker saga and the 2008 Clone Wars film and television series as canon. This means only Star Wars Modern Era Epic Collections are properly included in the official lore.

Marvel's Senior Vice President of sales and marketing, David Gabriel, said the Star Wars releases would "be bouncing around to different periods of Star Wars history with each Epic Collection, constructing one huge tapestry, collecting full unbroken runs of all the greatest Star Wars comics from the past 35 years."

Outside of the Original Marvel Years books, many of Star Wars Epic Collection contains contents originally published by Dark Horse comics. That said, although it can be considered completed, there are several omissions in the catalogue, such as the Clone Wars tie-in comic book series of the same name, written and illustrated by various creators involved with the series, including Henry Gilroy and Dave Filoni, a weekly webcomic of the same name, released exclusively on StarWars.com, as well as quarterly graphic novels of the same name.

==== The Original Marvel Years ====
Spine lettering: White
#	Years covered	Issues collected	Pages	Released	ISBN
1	1977-1979	Star Wars (1977) #1–23; material from Pizzazz #1–16 and Star Wars Weekly UK #60	496	Oct 26, 2016	Marvel Special Edition Featuring Star Wars #1 back cover: 978-1302902216
2	1979-1980	Star Wars (1977) #24–38, Annual #1; Star Wars Weekly UK #94–99, 104–115	448	Jul 12, 2017	Star Wars #27 cover: 978-1302906801
3	1980-1982	Star Wars (1977) #39–55; The Empire Strikes Back Monthly UK #149, 151, 153–157; Star Wars Monthly UK #159	488	Jul 18, 2018	Star Wars #50 cover: 978-1302911331
4	1982-1983	Star Wars (1977) #56–73, Annual #2	464	Aug 7, 2019	Star Wars #68 cover: 978-1302918491
5	1983-1984	Star Wars (1977) #74–88, Annual #3, Star Wars: Return of the Jedi #1-4	496	Aug 17, 2021	Star Wars #81 cover: 978-1302929893
6	1984-2019	Star Wars (1977) #89-107; Star Wars (2019) #108	544	May 9, 2023	Star Wars #107 cover: 978-1302951580
Droids & Ewoks	1985-1989	Ewoks #1-14, Annual 1989; Droids #1-8	536	Nov 12, 2024	Droids #6 cover: 978-1302956493

==== The Newspaper Strips ====
Spine lettering: Grey
#	Years covered	Issues collected	Pages	Released	ISBN
1	1979-1997	Classic Star Wars: The Early Adventures #1–9, Classic Star Wars: Han Solo at Stars' End #1–3, Classic Star Wars #1–3, Sunday strips from 11 Mar to 9 Sep 1979, daily & Sunday strips from 11 Aug to 5 Oct 1980; material from Classic Star Wars #4	472	Jan 25, 2017	978-1302904647
2	1992-1994	Classic Star Wars #5–20; material from Classic Star Wars #4	504	Jul 3, 2019	978-1302917371

==== Tales of the Jedi ====
Spine lettering: Grey-Blue
#	Years covered	Issues collected	Pages	Released	ISBN
1	2012-2013	Star Wars: Dawn of the Jedi - Force Storm #1-5; Star Wars: Dawn of the Jedi - Prisoner of Bogan #1-5; Star Wars: Dawn of the Jedi - Force War #1-5; Star Wars: Dawn of the Jedi #0	376	Dec 8, 2020	Star Wars: Dawn of the Jedi #0 cover: 978-1302926977
2	1993-1997	Star Wars: Tales of the Jedi - The Golden Age of the Sith #0-5; Star Wars: Tales of the Jedi - The Fall of the Sith Empire #1-5; Star Wars: Tales of the Jedi #1-5; Star Wars: Tales of the Jedi - The Freedon Nadd Uprising #1-2	480	Jun 28, 2022	Star Wars: Tales of the Jedi #1 cover: 978-1302945985
3	1993-2005	Star Wars: Tales of the Jedi - Dark Lords of the Sith #1-6; Star Wars: Tales of the Jedi - The Sith War #1-6; Star Wars: Tales of the Jedi - Redemption #1-5; material from Star Wars Tales #23; Dark Horse Comics #7-9	480	Jul 11, 2023	Star Wars: Tales of the Jedi - The Sith War #1 cover: 978-1302951887

==== The Old Republic ====
Spine lettering: Yellow
#	Years covered	Issues collected	Pages	Released	ISBN
1	2006–2007	Star Wars: Knights of the Old Republic #1–18; material from Star Wars: Knights of the Old Republic/Rebellion #0	440	Jul 1, 2015	Star Wars: Knights of the Old Republic/Rebellion #0 cover: 978-0785197171
1	2006–2007	Star Wars: Knights of the Old Republic #1–18; material from Star Wars: Knights of the Old Republic/Rebellion #0	440	May 21, 2024	Star Wars: Knights of the Old Republic/Rebellion #0 cover: 978-1302957865
2	2007–2009	Star Wars: Knights of the Old Republic #19–37; Star Wars: Knights of the Old Republic Handbook	480	Mar 8, 2017	Star Wars: Knights of the Old Republic #25 cover: 978-1302903770
3	2004–2012	Star Wars: Knights of the Old Republic #38–50, Star Wars: Knights of the Old Republic - War #1–5; material from Star Wars Tales #24	432	Mar 20, 2019	Star Wars: Knights of the Old Republic - War #2 cover: 978-1302916466
4	2005-2012	Star Wars: The Old Republic #1-6; Star Wars: The Old Republic - The Lost Suns #1-5; Star Wars: Lost Tribe of the Sith - Spiral #1-5; material from Star Wars Tales #17, 23; Star Wars Visionaries	456	Jun 4, 2021	Star Wars: The Old Republic #1 cover: 978-1302930875
5	2001-2012	Star Wars: Knight Errant #1-5, Star Wars: Knight Errant - Deluge #1-5, Star Wars: Knight Errant - Escape #1-5, Star Wars: Jedi Vs. Sith #1-6; material from: Star Wars Tales #16	512	Mar 7, 2023	Star Wars: Knight Errant - Deluge #5 cover: 978-1302950699

==== Rise of the Sith ====
Spine lettering: Crimson
#	Years covered	Issues collected	Pages	Released	ISBN
1	1999–2011	Star Wars: Jedi – The Dark Side #1–5, Star Wars: Qui-Gon & Obi-Wan – The Aurorient Express #1–2, Star Wars: Qui-Gon & Obi-Wan – Last Stand on Ord Mantell #1–3, Star Wars: Jedi Council – Acts of War #1–4; material from Star Wars (1998) #4–6, Star Wars Tales #1, 3–5, 7, 9–10, 13–14, 24	488	Aug 26, 2015	Jedi Council: Acts of War #4 cover: 978-0785197225
1	1999–2011	Star Wars: Jedi – The Dark Side #1–5, Star Wars: Qui-Gon & Obi-Wan – The Aurorient Express #1–2, Star Wars: Qui-Gon & Obi-Wan – Last Stand on Ord Mantell #1–3, Star Wars: Jedi Council – Acts of War #1–4; material from Star Wars (1998) #4–6, Star Wars Tales #1, 3–5, 7, 9–10, 13–14, 24	488	Feb 27, 2024	Jedi Council: Acts of War #4 cover: 978-1302957803
2	1998–2004	Star Wars #0–3, Star Wars: Darth Maul #1–4, Star Wars: Episode I – The Phantom Menace #½, 1–4, Star Wars: Episode I: Anakin Skywalker, Queen Amidala, Qui-Gon Jinn, Obi-Wan Kenobi; material from Star Wars #4–6 and Star Wars Tales #3, 5, 7, 14, 20	496	Nov 15, 2017	Darth Maul #2 cover: 978-1302907907

==== The Menace Revealed ====
Spine lettering: Blue
#	Years covered	Issues collected	Pages	Released	ISBN
1	1999–2005	Star Wars: Jango Fett – Open Seasons #1–4, Star Wars (1998) #7–18; material from Star Wars Tales #8, 21–24	480	Sep 19, 2018	Star Wars: Jango Fett - Open Seasons #1 cover: 978-1302913731
2	2000–2002	Star Wars (1998) #19–35; material from Dark Horse Extra #35–37, Star Wars Tales #13 and Dark Horse Presents Annual 2000	440	Nov 6, 2019	Star Wars (1998) #19 cover: 978-1302920333
3	2001–2002	Star Wars (1998) #36-45, Star Wars: Jedi Quest (2001) #1-4, Star Wars: Jango Fett (2002) #1, Star Wars: Zam Wesell (2002) #1	448	Feb 7, 2023	Star Wars: Jedi Quest #1 cover: 978-1302932312
4	1999-2005	Star Wars: The Bounty Hunter - Aurra Sing #1; Star Wars: Starfighter - Crossbones #1-3; Star Wars: Republic 46–48; Star Wars: Episode II - Attack of the Clones #1-4; Star Wars: Hasbro/Toys 'R' Us Exclusive #1-4; Free Comic Book Day 2002: Star Wars #1	448	Jan 23, 2024	Star Wars: Episode II - Attack of the Clones #3 cover: 978-1302953911

==== The Clone Wars ====
Spine lettering: Blue-Grey
#	Years covered	Issues collected	Pages	Released	ISBN
1	2003–2004	Star Wars: Republic #49–54, Star Wars: Jedi: Mace Windu, Shaak Ti, Aayla Secura, Count Dooku, Yoda; material from Star Wars Tales #14, 19, Star Wars Visionaries	424	Dec 28, 2016	Star Wars: Jedi - Yoda #1 cover: 978-0785195535
2	2003–2012	Star Wars: Republic #55–67, Star Wars: Darth Maul – Death Sentence #1–4; material from Star Wars Tales #22	424	Mar 21, 2018	Star Wars: Republic #67 cover: 978-1302910181
3	2003-2006	Star Wars: Republic #68-73, Star Wars: General Grievous #1-4, Free Comic Book Day 2006: Star Wars, Star Wars: Obsession #1-5; material from Star Wars: Visionaries, Star Wars Tales #17	424	Mar 25, 2020	Star Wars: Republic #71 cover: 978-1302923761
4	2000-2014	FCBD 2005: Star Wars #1; Star Wars: Darth Maul - Son of Dathomir #1-4; Star Wars: Republic #74-77 and #81-83; Star Wars: Episode III - Revenge of the Sith #1-4; Star Wars: Tag & Bink II #2; material from Star Wars Visionaries, Star Wars Tales #4	440	Aug 9, 2022	Star Wars: Episode III - Revenge of the Sith #2 cover: 978-1302932305

==== The Empire ====
Spine lettering: Red
#	Years covered	Issues collected	Pages	Released	ISBN
1	2005-2013	Star Wars: Republic #78–80; Star Wars: Purge #1; Star Wars: Purge – Seconds to Die #1; Star Wars: Purge – The Hidden Blade #1; Star Wars: Purge – The Tyrant's Fist #1–2; Star Wars: Darth Vader and the Lost Command #1–5; Star Wars: Dark Times #1–5	440	Apr 8, 2015	978-0785193982
1	2005-2013	Star Wars: Republic #78–80; Star Wars: Purge #1; Star Wars: Purge – Seconds to Die #1; Star Wars: Purge – The Hidden Blade #1; Star Wars: Purge – The Tyrant's Fist #1–2; Star Wars: Darth Vader and the Lost Command #1–5; Star Wars: Dark Times #1–5	440	Mar 19, 2024	978-1302957827
2	2007–2012	Star Wars: Dark Times #6–17; Star Wars: Dark Times – Blue Harvest #0; Star Wars: Dark Times – Out of the Wilderness #1–5	440	Oct 21, 2015	978-0785197249
2	2007–2012	Star Wars: Dark Times #6–17; Star Wars: Dark Times – Blue Harvest #0; Star Wars: Dark Times – Out of the Wilderness #1–5	440	Dec 17, 2024	978-1302960704
3	2012–2013	Star Wars: Darth Vader and the Ghost Prison #1–5; Star Wars: Dark Times – Fire Carrier #1–5; Star Wars: Dark Times – A Spark Remains #1–5; Star Wars: Darth Vader and the Ninth Assassin #1–5	472	Feb 8, 2017	978-1302903756
4	1995–2014	Star Wars: Darth Vader and the Cry of Shadows #1–5, Star Wars: Jabba the Hutt – The Gear Suppoon Hit, The Hunger of Princess Nampi, The Dynasty Trap, Betrayal, Star Wars: Boba Fett – Enemy of the Empire #1–4; material from Star Wars Tales #7, 11–12, 15, 18–20, Star Wars: Visionaries, Dark Horse Presents Annual '99 and Free Comic Book Day 2012: Star Wars	496	May 23, 2018	978-1302912086
5	1994–2004	Star Wars: Droids (1994) #1–6, Special; Star Wars: Droids (1995) #1–8; Star Wars: The Protocol Offensive #1; material from Star Wars Galaxy Magazine #1 and Star Wars Tales #16, 20	480	Apr 24, 2019	978-1302918095
6	1996- 2013	Star Wars: Agent of the Empire - Iron Eclipse #1-5, Star Wars: Agent of the Empire - Hard Targets #1-5, Star Wars: The Force Unleashed, Star Wars: The Force Unleashed II; material from Star Wars Tales #11, 15 and A Decade of Dark Horse #2	480	Sep 15, 2020	978-1302925116
7	1999-2013	Star Wars: Blood Ties #1-4; Star Wars: Blood Ties - Boba Fett Is Dead #1-4; Star Wars: Empire #1-4; Star Wars: Underworld - The Yavin Vassilika #1-5; Free Comic Book Day: Star Wars 2013; material from Star War Tales #1-2, 6, 16	488	Sep 6, 2022	978-1302946012
8	1997-2004	Star Wars: Empire #5-6, 8–13, 15; Star Wars: X-Wing Rogue Squadron #½; Star Wars: A New Hope Special Edition #1-4; Star Wars: Tag & Bink Are Dead #1; material from Star Wars Tales #1, 6, 8–10, 12, 14, 16, 19	496	Nov 14, 2023	978-1302953904

==== The Rebellion ====
Spine lettering: Blue
#	Years covered	Issues collected	Pages	Released	ISBN
1	1999-2013	Star Wars: Empire #7, 14, 16–18; Star Wars: Vader's Quest #1–4; Star Wars (2013) #1–12	504	Jun 22, 2016	978-0785195467
2	1997-2014	Star Wars (2013) #13–20; Star Wars: Empire #19–27; material from Star Wars Kids #1–20	488	May 10, 2017	978-1302906962
3	1987-2006	Star Wars: River of Chaos #1–4; Star Wars: Empire #28–40; Star Wars 3-D #1–3	488	May 22, 2019	978-1302918149
4	1997-2008	Star Wars: Rebellion #1-16, Star Wars: Boba Fett - Overkill #1, Star Wars: Boba Fett #½; material from Star Wars: Knights Of The Old Republic/Rebellion #0 and Star Wars Tales #3, 15, 17, 21	496	Aug 18, 2020	978-1302925055
5	1994-2014	Star Wars: Splinter of the Mind's Eye #1-4; Star Wars: Shadow Stalker #1; Star Wars: Rebel Heist #1-4; Star Wars: A Valentine Story #1; Classic Star Wars: The Empire Strikes Back #1-2; Star Wars: Tag and Bink are Dead #2; material from Star War Tales #4-6, 15–17, 20	488	Dec 13, 2022	978-1302948337
6	1994-2006	Star Wars: Shadows of the Empire #1-6; Star Wars: The Bounty Hunters - Scoundrel's Wages #1; Classic Star Wars: Return of the Jedi #1-2; Star Wars: Tales from Mos Eisley #1; Star Wars: Tag & Bink II #1; Sergio Aragones Stomps Star Wars #1; Star Wars: Shadows of the Empire Minicomic #1-2; material from Star Wars Kids #12; Star Wars Visionaries; Star Wars Tales #2, 4–8, 10, 12, 14, 20	488	Sep 24, 2024	978-1302956400

==== The New Republic ====
Spine lettering: Green
#	Years covered	Issues collected	Pages	Released	ISBN
1	1997–2005	Star Wars: Mara Jade – By the Emperor's Hand #0–6, Star Wars: Shadows of the Empire – Evolution #1–5, Star Wars: The Jabba Tape, Star Wars: Boba Fett – Twin Engines of Destruction; material from Star Wars Tales #1, 3–5, 10, 14–15, 20, 22	488	May 13, 2015	978-0785197164
1	1997–2005	Star Wars: Mara Jade – By the Emperor's Hand #0–6, Star Wars: Shadows of the Empire – Evolution #1–5, Star Wars: The Jabba Tape, Star Wars: Boba Fett – Twin Engines of Destruction; material from Star Wars Tales #1, 3–5, 10, 14–15, 20, 22	488	Apr 16, 2024	978-1302957841
2	1995–2005	Star Wars: X-Wing - Rogue Leader #1–3, Star Wars: X-Wing - Rogue Squadron #1–16, Special; material from Star Wars Tales #12, 23	512	Mar 23, 2016	978-0785197232
3	1997–1998	Star Wars: X-Wing - Rogue Squadron #17–35	472	Dec 6, 2017	978-1302907976
4	1995–1998	Star Wars: Heir to the Empire #1–6; Star Wars: Dark Force Rising #1–6; Star Wars: The Last Command #1–6	472	Oct 17, 2018	978-1302913830
5	1991–2003	Star Wars: Dark Empire #1-6; Star Wars: Dark Empire II #1-6; Star Wars: Empire's End #1-2; Star Wars Handbook (1998) #1, 3; material from Star Wars Tales #8, 11, 16–17	496	Mar 19, 2021	978-1302926984
6	1997-2012	Star Wars: Crimson Empire #0-6; Star Wars: The Bounty Hunters - Kenix Kil #1; Star Wars: Crimson Empire II - Council of Blood #1-6; Star Wars: Crimson Empire III - Empire Lost #1-6; material from Dark Horse Extra #21-24; Dark Horse Presents #1	496	Oct 4, 2022	978-1302948313
7	1995-2004	Star Wars: Boba Fett - Bounty on Bar-Kooda #1, Star Wars: Boba Fett - When the Fat Lady Swings #2, Star Wars: Boba Fett - Murder Most Foul #3, Star Wars: Boba Fett - Agent of Doom #1; Star Wars: Jedi Academy - Leviathan #1-4; Star Wars: The Mixed-Up Droid #1; Star Wars: Union #1-4; Star Wars: Chewbacca #1-4; material from Star Wars Tales #19	488	Dec 5, 2023	978-1302953928
8	2009-2011	Star Wars: Invasion #0-5; Star Wars: Invasion: Rescues #1-6; Star Wars: Invasion: Revelations #1-5; Star Wars Handbook 2: Crimson Empire; material from Star Wars: Tales #18-19, 21	488	Oct 29, 2024	978-1302959647

==== Legacy ====
Spine lettering: Orange
#	Years covered	Issues collected	Pages	Released	ISBN
1	2006–2008	Star Wars: Legacy (2006) #0–19	464	Sep 28, 2016	978-1302900120
2	2006–2009	Star Wars: Legacy (2006) #20–36, 41, 0, –½	464	Jan 17, 2018	978-1302910198
3	2006- 2010	Star Wars: Legacy (2006) #37-40, 42–50; Star Wars: Legacy - War (2010) #1-6	448	Jul 7, 2020	978-1302923754
4	2004-2014	Star Wars: Legacy (2013) #1-18; material from Star Wars Tales (1999) #19; Star Wars Visionaries (2005) #1	456	Mar 15, 2022	978-1302934507

==== Infinities ====
Spine lettering: Purple
#	Years covered	Issues collected	Pages	Released	ISBN
1	2001–2014	Star Wars: Infinities – A New Hope #1–4; Star Wars: Infinities – The Empire Strikes Back #1–4; Star Wars: Infinities – Return of the Jedi #1–4; The Star Wars #0–8	504	Dec 16, 2015	978-0785197256

=== Thor ===
The character of Thor launched in Journey Into Mystery #83 and became so popular that the book was retitled to Thor with issue #126.

Some of the character's most notable storylines - including The Surtur Saga and The Ballad of Beta Ray Bill - are yet to be reprinted in an Epic collection, though others include To Wake the Mangog in Volume 4, and The Eternals Saga in Volume 10.

Spine lettering: Blue
#	Subtitle	Years covered	Issues collected	Writers	Artists	Pages	Released	ISBN
1	The God of Thunder	1962-1964	Journey into Mystery #83–109	Stan Lee	Jack Kirby, Joe Sinnott, Don Heck	480	Oct 15, 2014	Journey into Mystery #105 cover: 978-0785188353
1	The God of Thunder	1962-1964	Journey into Mystery #83–109	Stan Lee	Jack Kirby, Joe Sinnott, Don Heck	480	Apr 5, 2022	Journey into Mystery #105 cover: 978-1302933982
2	When Titans Clash	1964-1966	Journey into Mystery #110–125, Annual #1, Thor #126–130; material from Not Brand Echh #3	Stan Lee	Jack Kirby	504	Nov 2, 2016	Journey into Mystery #114 cover: 978-0785194460
3	The Wrath of Odin	1966-1968	Thor #131–153, Annual #2	Stan Lee	Jack Kirby	512	Sep 27, 2017	Thor #151 cover: 978-1302903794
3	The Wrath of Odin	1966-1968	Thor #131–153, Annual #2	Stan Lee	Jack Kirby	512	Mar 1, 2022	Thor #151 cover: 978-1302933883
4	To Wake the Mangog	1968-1970	Thor #154–174	Stan Lee	Jack Kirby	456	Feb 25, 2015	Thor #156 cover: 978-0785191735
4	To Wake the Mangog	1968-1970	Thor #154–174	Stan Lee	Jack Kirby	456	Feb 1, 2022	Thor #156 cover: 978-1302933753
5	The Fall of Asgard	1970-1971	Thor #175–194	Stan Lee	Jack Kirby, John Buscema	432	Sep 26, 2018	Thor #175 cover: 978-1302912741
6	Into the Dark Nebula	1972-1973	Thor #195-216	Gerry Conway	John Buscema	480	Mar 25, 2020	Thor #197 cover: 978-1302922481
7	Ulik Unchained	1973-1975	Thor #217-241; Marvel Premiere #26	Gerry Conway	John Buscema	512	Dec 21, 2021	Thor #229 cover: 978-1302929497
8	War of the Gods	1975-1977	Thor #242-259, Annual #5; Marvel Spotlight #30	Len Wein	John Buscema	392	Jun 5, 2022	Thor #257 cover: 978-1302933647
9	Even an Immortal Can Die	1977-1979	Thor #260-280, Annual #6-7, Marvel Preview #10	Len Wein, Roy Thomas	John Buscema, Walt Simonson	520	Apr 25, 2023	Thor #274 cover: 978-1302948689
10	The Eternals Saga	1979-1980	Thor #281-302, Annual #8; material from Marvel Treasury Edition #24, 26	Roy Thomas, Mark Gruenwald, Ralph Macchio	Keith Pollard, John Buscema	496	Nov 26, 2024	Thor #300 cover: 978-1302955540
11	A Kingdom Lost	1981-1982	Thor #303–319, Annual #9–10	Doug Moench, Ralph Macchio, Mark Gruenwald	Keith Pollard	480	Apr 16, 2014	Thor #318 cover: 978-0785188629
12	Runequest	1982-1983	Thor #320–336, Annual #11; material from Bizarre Adventures #32	Doug Moench, Alan Zelenetz, Bob Hall	Alan Kupperberg, Bob Hall, Mark Bright	456	Aug 10, 2016	Thor #334 cover: 978-0785194453
13	The Surtur War	1983-1985	Thor #337–356	Walter Simonson	Walter Simonson	496	Mar 3, 2026	Thor #338 cover: 978-1302967710
16	War of the Pantheons	1987-1989	Thor #383–400	Tom DeFalco	Ron Frenz	472	Oct 23, 2013	Thor #390 cover: 978-0785187882
17	In Mortal Flesh	1989-1990	Thor #401–418, Annual #14	Tom DeFalco, Randall Frenz, Roy Thomas	Ron Frenz, Herb Trimpe, Al Milgrom	488	Aug 2, 2017	Thor Annual #14 cover: 978-1302906986
17	In Mortal Flesh	1989-1990	Thor #401–418, Annual #14	Tom DeFalco, Randall Frenz, Roy Thomas	Ron Frenz, Herb Trimpe, Al Milgrom	488	Aug 8, 2023	Thor Annual #14 cover: 978-1302950514
18	The Black Galaxy	1990-1991	Thor #419–436, Annual #15	Roy Thomas, Tom DeFalco	Herb Trimpe, Gary Hartle, Ron Frenz	488	Aug 14, 2019	Thor #433 cover: 978-1302918507
19	The Thor War	1991-1992	Thor #437-450, Annual #16-17	Tom DeFalco	Ron Frenz, Pat Olliffe	472	Dec 9, 2020	Thor #440 cover: 978-1302927066
19	The Thor War	1991-1992	Thor #437-450, Annual #16-17	Tom DeFalco	Ron Frenz, Pat Olliffe	472	Nov 15, 2022	Thor #440 cover: 978-1302946913
20	The Final Gauntlet	1992-1993	Thor #451-467, Thor Corps #1-4	Tom DeFalco, Ron Marz	Ron Frenz, Bruce Zick, Pat Olliffe	504	Jun 1, 2021	Thor #457 cover: 978-1302930882
21	Blood and Thunder	1993-1994	Thor #468-475, Annual #18; Silver Surfer (vol. 3) #86-88; Warlock Chronicles #6-8; Warlock and the Infinity Watch #23-25	Ron Marz, Jim Starlin, Roy Thomas	Cam Smith, M.C. Wyman	504	Nov 30, 2022	Silver Surfer (vol. 3) #88 cover: 978-1302948269
22	Hel On Earth	1994-1995	Thor #476-490, Annual #19; material from Avengers Annual #23	Roy Thomas	John Buscema, Jerry DeClaire, M.C. Wyman	512	Jul 18, 2023	Thor #488 cover: 978-1302951894
23	Worldengine	1995-1996	Thor #491–502; Captain America #449; Iron Man #326; Avengers #396; Thor: The Legend	Warren Ellis, William Messner-Loebs, Mark Waid, Terry Kavanagh	Mike Deodato Jr., Geof Isherwood	432	Jun 13, 2018	Thor #492 cover: 978-1302911577
24	The Lost Gods	1996-1997	Journey into Mystery #503-513, -1; Valkyrie #1; Hercules And The Heart of Chaos #1-3	Tom DeFalco	Mike Deodato Jr., John Buscema, Pablo Raimondi, Ron Frenz	400	Jun 4, 2024	Journey into Mystery #503 cover: 978-1302956509
25	The Dark Gods	1998-1999	Thor (vol. 2) #1-13, Annual '99; Silver Surfer/Thor Annual '98; Peter Parker: Spider-Man #2	Dan Jurgens, Tom DeFalco	John Romita Jr., Ramon Bernado, John Buscema	480	Jul 29, 2025	Thor (vol. 2) #1 cover: 978-1302964115
Jump to: Thor Modern Era Epic Collection

=== Thunderbolts ===
Created by Kurt Busiek and Mark Bagley, the Thunderbolts team first appeared in The Incredible Hulk #449, from January 1997.

That issue has yet to be reprinted in the Hulk series of Epic Collections.

Spine lettering: Gold
#	Subtitle	Years covered	Issues collected	Writers	Artists	Pages	Released	ISBN
1	Justice, Like Lightning	1997-1998	Thunderbolts #1-12, Annual '97; Thunderbolts: Distant Rumblings #-1; Incredible Hulk (vol. 2) #449; Spider-Man Team-Up #7; Heroes for Hire #7; material from Tales of the Marvel Universe #1	Kurt Busiek, Roger Stern	Mark Bagley, Sal Buscema	520	Jul 18, 2023	Thunderbolts #1 cover: 978-1302952051
2	Wanted Dead or Alive	1998-1999	Thunderbolts #13-25, 0; Captain America & Citizen V Annual 1998; Avengers (vol. 3) #12	Kurt Busiek, Karl Kesel, Barbara Kesel	Mark Bagley, George Perez	432	Apr 30, 2024	Thunderbolts #0 cover: 978-1302956462
3	Targeted For Death	1999-2000	Thunderbolts #26-41, Annual (2000); Avengers Annual (2000)	Kurt Busiek, Fabian Nicieza, Joe Casey	Mark Bagley, Norm Breyfogle, Leonardo Manco	464	May 27, 2025	Thunderbolts #27 cover: 978-1302964122
4	Redemption	2000-2001	Thunderbolts #42-52; Avengers (vol. 3) #31-34; Thunderbolts: Life Sentences	Fabian Nicieza, Kurt Busiek	George Perez, Mark Bagley, Patch Zircher	440	Mar 24, 2026	Thunderbolts #43 cover: 978-1302968441
5	Criminal Intent	2001-2002	Thunderbolts #53-63; Citizen V and the Battalion #1-3; Citizen V and the Battalion: The Everlasting 1-4	Fabian Nicieza & Michael Barreiro	Patch Zircher, Mark Bagley, Michael Ryan, Lewis LaRosa & Jose Kleber de Moura Jr.	448	Mar 23, 2027	Thunderbolts #58 cover: 978-1302971892

=== Venom ===
Venom did not get his own ongoing Marvel Comics series until 2003. Marvel's legacy numbering for the title started with 1993's, Lethal Protector, with various miniseries making up 60 issues before crossing into the Modern Era.

Spine lettering: Grey
#	Subtitle	Years covered	Issues collected	Legacy	Writers	Artists	Pages	Released	ISBN
1	Symbiosis	1984-1992	Amazing Spider-Man #258, #300, #315–317, #332–333, #346–347, and more: Web of Spider-Man #1; Marvel Graphic Novel No. 68 - Avengers: Deathtrap - The Vault; Darkhawk #13-14; material from Amazing Spider-Man #388 (1994), Annual #25-26; Web of Spider-Man Annual #7-8; Spectacular Spider-Man Annual #12		David Michelinie, Danny Fingeroth	Todd McFarlane, Ron Lim, Erik Larsen, Mike Manley	472	Nov 4, 2020	Amazing Spider-Man #347 cover: 978-1302927295
2	Lethal Protector	1992-1993	Amazing Spider-Man #361–363, #374; Spider-Man: The Trial of Venom, and more: Web of Spider-Man #95-96; Ghost Rider/Blaze: Spirits of Vengeance #5-6; Venom: Lethal Protector #1-6; material from Marvel Comics Presents #117-122; Amazing Spider-Man #373, 375	#1-6	David Michelinie, Howard Mackie	Mark Bagley, Sam Kieth, Ron Lim	480	Jan 4, 2022	Web of Spider-Man #95 cover: 978-1302932046
4	The Madness	1993-1994	Venom: The Madness #1-3; Venom: The Enemy Within #1-3, and more: Iron Man #302; Darkhawk #35-37; Incredible Hulk vs. Venom #1; Venom: The Mace #1-3; Nightwatch #5-6; Venom: Nights of Vengeance #1-4	#10-22	Danny Fingeroth, Ann Nocenti, Bruce Jones, Carl Potts, Howard Mackie	Tod Smith, Kelley Jones, Bob McLeod, Liam Sharp, Ron Lim	480	Sep 12, 2023	Venom: The Enemy Within #1 cover: 978-1302953874
5	Carnage Unleashed	1994-1995	Web Of Spider-Man #118-119; Spider-Man #52-53, and more: Spider-Man: The Arachnis Project #6; Venom: Separation Anxiety #1-4; Venom: Carnage Unleashed #1-4; Venom: Sinner Takes All #5; Uncanny Origins #7 (1997); material from Venom: Sinner Takes All #1-4	#23-30, 32–36	Howard Mackie, Larry Hama	Andrew Wildman, Ron Randell, Greg Luzniak	496	Sep 27, 2022	Venom: Carnage Unleashed #3 cover: 978-1302948252
6	Planet of the Symbiotes	1995-1996	Venom: Along Came A Spider #1-4; Venom: The Hunted #1-3, and more: material from: Amazing Spider-Man: Super Special; Spider-Man: Super Special; Venom: Super Special; Web Of Spider-Man: Super Special; Spectacular Spider-Man: Super Special; Venom: Sinner Takes All #1-4; Spider-Man: Holiday Special (1995)	#31, 37–43	Larry Hama, Evan Skolnick, David Michelinie	Joe St. Pierre, Duncan Rouleau,	488	Oct 28, 2025	Venom: The Hunted #2 cover: 978-1302965211
7	The Hunger	1996-1998	Venom: The Hunger #1-4; Venom: Tooth And Claw #1-3, and more: Venom: On Trial #1-3; Venom: License to Kill #1-3; Venom: Seeds Of Darkness #-1; Venom: Sign Of The Boss #1-2; Spider-Man: The Venom Agenda #1; Venom: The Finale #1-3	#44-60	Len Kaminski, Larry Hama,	Ted Halsted, Joe St. Pierre, Josh Hood, Mark Pajarillo	512	Aug 27, 2024	Venom: The Finale #2 cover: 978-1302959890
8	Shadows of the Past	1999-2010	Peter Parker: Spider-Man #9-10, 16-17 and more: Nova #7; Amazing Spider-Man (vol. 2) #19; Spectacular Spider-Man (vol. 2) #1-5; Spider-Man/Fantastic Four #2; material from Amazing Spider-Man (vol. 2) #12; Peter Parker: Spider-Man #12; Spider-Man Family #1-2		Howard Mackie, Paul Jenkins, Sean Kelley McKeever	John Romita Jr., Humberto Ramos	432	Sep 29, 2026	Spectacular Spider-Man (vol. 2) #1 cover: 978-1302969523
Jump to: Venom Modern Era Epic Collection

=== Wolverine ===
Wolverine's first appearance is collected in Incredible Hulk Epic Collection Vol. 7: And Now... The Wolverine. Afterwards the character would have many more appearances which are collected from X-Men Epic Collection Vol. 5: Second Genesis through X-Men Epic Collection Vol. 15: Fall of the Mutants before the first volume of this series. His first miniseries was reproduced in X-Men Epic Collection Vol. 10: God Loves, Man Kills.

Notable storylines in Wolverine's own Epic Collection line include the character fighting sentient cocaine, and Jungle Adventure, both in Vol. 2: Back to Basics; the Bone Claw Era (Vol. 8: The Dying Game); and the Origin miniseries (Vol. 13: Blood Debt).

Spine lettering: Orange
#	Subtitle	Years covered	Issues collected	Writers	Artists	Pages	Released	ISBN
1	Madripoor Nights	1988-1989	Wolverine (vol. 2) #1–16; material from Marvel Comics Presents #1–10, Marvel Age Annual #4	Chris Claremont, Peter David	John Buscema, Gene Colan	504	Dec 10, 2014	Wolverine (vol. 2) #6 cover: 978-0785189039
1	Madripoor Nights	1988-1989	Wolverine (vol. 2) #1–16; material from Marvel Comics Presents #1–10, Marvel Age Annual #4	Chris Claremont, Peter David	John Buscema, Gene Colan	504	May 12, 2021	Wolverine (vol. 2) #6 cover: 978-1302928483
1	Madripoor Nights	1988-1989	Wolverine (vol. 2) #1–16; material from Marvel Comics Presents #1–10, Marvel Age Annual #4	Chris Claremont, Peter David	John Buscema, Gene Colan	504	May 17, 2022	Wolverine (vol. 2) #6 cover: 978-1302946876
2	Back to Basics	1989-1990	Wolverine (vol. 2) #17–30; Marvel Graphic Novel No. 50 - Wolverine/Nick Fury: The Scorpio Connection; Wolverine: The Jungle Adventure	Archie Goodwin, Walt Simonson, Jo Duffy	Howard Chaykin, Mike Mignola, John Byrne	464	Mar 6, 2019	Wolverine (vol. 2) #27 cover: 978-1302916091
2	Back to Basics	1989-1990	Wolverine (vol. 2) #17–30; Marvel Graphic Novel No. 50 - Wolverine/Nick Fury: The Scorpio Connection; Wolverine: The Jungle Adventure	Archie Goodwin, Walt Simonson, Jo Duffy	Howard Chaykin, Mike Mignola, John Byrne	464	Oct 12, 2022	Wolverine (vol. 2) #27 cover: 978-1302946937
3	Blood and Claws	1990-1991	Wolverine (vol. 2) #31–44; Wolverine: Bloodlust; Wolverine: Bloody Choices	Larry Hama, Tom DeFalco	Marc Silvestri, Alan Davis, John Buscema	456	Jul 7, 2021	Wolverine (vol. 2) #41 cover: 978-1302930899
4	Escape from Weapon X	1991	Wolverine (vol. 2) #45-50; Wolverine: Rahne of Terra #1; X-Men (vol. 2) #4-7; material from Marvel Comics Presents #72-84			480	Jun 1, 2027	Wolverine (vol. 2) #48 cover: 978-1302971915
5	Valley of Death	1991-1992	Wolverine (vol. 2) #51-68; Ghost Rider / Wolverine / Punisher: Hearts Of Darkness; material from Marvel Holiday Special #2	Larry Hama	Andy Kubert, Mark Texeira, Steve Biasi	496	Sep 22, 2026	Wolverine (vol. 2) #51 cover: 978-1302969691
6	Inner Fury	1992-1993	Wolverine (vol. 2) #69-75; Wolverine: Inner Fury; Wolverine: Killing; Wolverine: Global Jeopardy; Sabretooth #1-4; X-Men #25	Larry Hama	Bill Sienkiewicz, Dwayne Turner, Kent Williams, Mark Texeira	472	Mar 11, 2020	Wolverine (vol. 2) #70 cover: 978-1302923907
7	To the Bone	1993-1994	Wolverine (vol. 2) #76-86; Cable #16; Wolverine: Evilution; Wolverine & Nick Fury: Scorpio Rising; Ghost Rider/Wolverine/Punisher: The Dark Design	Larry Hama, Ann Nocenti, Howard Mackie	Adam Kubert, Ron Garney	480	Jun 20, 2023	Wolverine (vol. 2) #79 cover: 978-1302951689
8	The Dying Game	1994-1996	Wolverine (vol. 2) #87–100, Annual '95; Wolverine: Knight of Terra	Larry Hama	Adam Kubert, James Williams III, Jan Duursema	488	Dec 9, 2015	Wolverine (vol. 2) #100 cover: 978-0785192619
9	Tooth and Claw	1996-1997	Wolverine (vol. 2) #101-109, 102.5, Annual '96; Uncanny X-Men #332; Venom: Tooth and Claw #1-3; Logan: Path of the Warlord #1; Logan: Shadow Society #1	Larry Hama, Howard Mackie	Val Semeiks, Anthony Winn, Joe St. Pierre	496	Aug 2, 2022	Venom: Tooth and Claw #3 cover: 978-1302946500
12	Shadow of Apocalypse	1999-2000	Wolverine (vol. 2) #133–149; Hulk #8; Wolverine/Cable: Guts and Glory	Erik Larsen, Eric Stephenson	Jeff Matsuda, Leinil Francis Yu, Mike Miller, Roger Cruz	504	Feb 1, 2017	Wolverine (vol. 2) #145 cover: 978-1302903855
13	Blood Debt	1999-2002	Wolverine (vol. 2) #150–158, Annual '99; Wolverine: Origin #1–6	Steve Skroce, Eric Stephenson, Paul Jenkins	Rob Liefeld, Ian Churchill, Adam Kubert	488	Mar 28, 2018	Wolverine (vol. 2) #154 cover: 978-1302910228
14	The Return of Weapon X	2000-2002	Wolverine (vol. 2) #159-172, Wolverine Annual 2000–2001	Frank Tieri	Jorge Santamaria, Sean Chen, Dan Fraga, Matthew Marsilia	448	Mar 26, 2024	Wolverine (vol. 2) #159 cover: 978-1302958114
15	Law of the Jungle	2002-2003	Wolverine (vol. 2) #173-189	Frank Tieri, Matt Nixon, Daniel Way	Sean Chen, Dan Fraga, Staz Johnson	440	Mar 25, 2025	Wolverine (vol. 2) #174 cover: 978-1302964139

=== X-Factor ===
Launched in 1986, X-Factor featured Angel, Beast, Cyclops, Marvel Girl and Iceman, the original line-up of X-Men from 1963.

The team debuted in Fantastic Four #286, with notable storylines including the introduction of villain Apocalypse in Volume 1: Genesis & Apocalypse, the conclusion of the Inferno event in Volume 4: Judgment War, plus the introduction of a new roster, led by Havok, in Volume 7: All-New, All-Different X-Factor.

Spine lettering: Blue
#	Subtitle	Years covered	Issues collected	Writers	Artists	Pages	Released	ISBN
1	Genesis & Apocalypse	1986	Avengers #263, Fantastic Four #286, X-Factor #1–9, Annual #1, Iron Man Annual #8, Amazing Spider-Man #282; material from Classic X-Men #8, 43	John Byrne, Bob Layton, Louise Simonson, Bob Harras	John Byrne, Jackson Guice, Paul Neary	456	Feb 28, 2017	X-Factor #1 cover: 978-1302900687
1	Genesis & Apocalypse	1986	Avengers #263, Fantastic Four #286, X-Factor #1–9, Annual #1, Iron Man Annual #8, Amazing Spider-Man #282; material from Classic X-Men #8, 43	John Byrne, Bob Layton, Louise Simonson, Bob Harras	John Byrne, Jackson Guice, Paul Neary	456	Feb 24, 2021	X-Factor #1 cover: 978-1302928506
2	The Morlock Massacre	1986-1987	X-Factor #10-20, Annual #2; Thor #373-374, 377–378; Power Pack #27; Incredible Hulk #336-337	Louise Simonson, Walter Simonson, Peter David, Jo Duffy	Walter Simonson, Sal Buscema	488	Nov 17, 2026	X-Factor #13 cover: 978-1302969530
3	Angel of Death	1987-1989	X-Factor #21-36, Annual #3; Power Pack #35	Louise Simonson, Walt Simonson	Sal Buscema, Jon Bogdanove, Terry Shoemaker, Steve Lightle	488	May 4, 2021	X-Factor #24 cover: 978-1302927103
4	Judgement War	1989-1990	X-Factor #37-50, Annual #4; Uncanny X-Men #242-243	Louise Simonson, Walter Simonson, John Byrne	Arthur Adams, Tom Smith, John Byrne	496	Aug 15, 2023	X-Factor #50 cover: 978-1302953980
7	All-New, All-Different X-Factor	1991-1992	X-Factor #71–83, Annual #7; Incredible Hulk #390–392	Peter David, Fabian Nicieza	Larry Stroman, Dale Keown, Joe Quesada	456	Nov 28, 2018	X-Factor #71 cover: 978-1302913861
8	X-Aminations	1992-1994	X-Factor #84–100, Annual #8	Peter David, Scott Lobdell, J.M. DeMatteis	Jae Lee, Joe Quesada, Jan Duursema	504	Nov 13, 2019	X-Factor #87 cover: 978-1302920579
9	Afterlives	1994-1995	X-Factor #101-111, X-Factor Annual #9, Spider-Man & X-Factor: Shadowgames 1–3, X-Force #38, Excalibur #82	J.M. DeMatteis, Todd DeZago	John Francis Moore, Jan Duursema, Mat Broome	496	Jun 21, 2022	X-Factor #101 cover: 978-1302934514
10	Wreaking Havok	1995-1997	X-Factor #112-126; Sabretooth and Mystique #1-4; Marvel Fanfare (1996) #6; material from X-Men: Prime (1995)	Howard Mackie	Jeff Matsuda, Steve Epting, Ariel Olivetti	496	Jan 28, 2025	X-Factor #117 cover: 978-1302959708

=== X-Force ===
The first appearance of X-Force is in New Mutants Epic Collection Volume 8: The End of the Beginning. That book leads directly into X-Force Epic Collection Volume 1: Under the Gun.

A notable storyline includes Destination Unknown from Vol. 7: Zero Tolerance.

Spine lettering: Blue
#	Subtitle	Years covered	Issues collected	Writers	Artists	Pages	Released	ISBN
Jump to: New Mutants Epic Collection
1	Under the Gun	1991-1992	X-Force #1–15, Annual #1; Spider-Man #16; Wolverine #54	Rob Liefeld, Fabian Nicieza	Todd McFarlane, Mark Pacella, Greg Capullo	496	Mar 22, 2017	X-Force #7 cover: 978-1302904579
2	X-Cutioner's Song	1992-1993	X-Force #16–19; Cable: Blood & Metal #1–2; Uncanny X-Men #294–296; X-Factor #84–86; X-Men #14–16; Stryfe's Strike File #1; New Warriors #31	Fabian Nicieza, Scott Lobdell	John Romita Jr., Brendan Peterson, Andy Kubert, Greg Capullo	496	Dec 11, 2019	Uncanny X-Men #294 cover: 978-1302920661
3	Assault on Graymalkin	1993	X-Force #20-26, Annual #2; Cable #1-4; Deadpool: The Circle Chase #1-4; Nomad #20	Fabian Nicieza	Greg Capullo, Art Thibert, Joe Madureira, Tony Daniel	496	Dec 12, 2023	X-Force #22 cover: 978-1302954024
4	Toy Soldiers	1993-1994	X-Force #27-39, Annual #3; Cable #6-8; New Warriors #45-46	Fabian Nicieza	Mat Broome, Tony Daniel, Aron Wiesenfeld, Darick Robertson, Mike Wieringo	512	Feb 18, 2025	X-Force #36 cover: 978-1302959814
5	Starting Over	1994-1996	X-Force #40-56; X-Force & Cable Annual (1995)	Fabian Nicieza, Jeph Loeb	Adam Pollina	488	Dec 29, 2026	X-Force #54 cover: 978-1302969783
7	Zero Tolerance	1997-1998	X-Force #66-84, -1	John Francis Moore	Adam Pollina, Pop Mhan, Andy Smith, Jim Cheung	472	Apr 19, 2022	X-Force #82 cover: 978-1302927110
8	Armageddon Now	1998-2000	X-Force #85-100, X-Force/Champions Annual 1998, X-Force Annual 1999	John Francis Moore	Terry Shoemaker, Jim Cheung, Anthony Williams, Chris Renaud	480	Jun 13, 2023	X-Force #100 cover: 978-1302948306

=== X-Men ===
The X-Men Epic Collection has three distinct periods. Volumes 1 to 4 reprint Classic X-Men books, written by Stan Lee and Roy Thomas, chronicling the period up to the comic's cancellation in 1970, and various guest appearances in other Marvel titles between 1970 and 1975.

Volume 5: Second Genesis starts with the reinvention of the team, in Giant-Sized X-Men from 1975. It then reproduces Chris Claremont's iconic 16-year run on Uncanny X-Men, concluding with volume 19: Mutant Genesis.

Volume 20: Bishop's Crossing starts the collection of material published after Claremont's exit in 1991.

Spine lettering: Blue
#	Subtitle	Years covered	Issues collected	Writers	Artists	Pages	Released	ISBN
1	Children of the Atom	1963-1966	X-Men #1–23	Stan Lee, Roy Thomas	Jack Kirby, Werner Roth	520	Dec 24, 2014	X-Men #15 cover: 978-0785189046
1	Children of the Atom	1963-1966	X-Men #1–23	Stan Lee, Roy Thomas	Jack Kirby, Werner Roth	520	Dec 11, 2019	X-Men #15 cover: 978-1302924171
1	Children of the Atom	1963-1966	X-Men #1–23	Stan Lee, Roy Thomas	Jack Kirby, Werner Roth	520	Apr 2, 2024	X-Men #15 cover: 978-1302957834
2	Lonely Are the Hunted	1966-1968	X-Men #24–45; Avengers #53; material from Not Brand Echh #4, 8	Roy Thomas	Werner Roth, Don Heck, George Tuska	504	Dec 7, 2016	X-Men #43 cover: 978-0785195832
2	Lonely Are the Hunted	1966-1968	X-Men #24–45; Avengers #53; material from Not Brand Echh #4, 8	Roy Thomas	Werner Roth, Don Heck, George Tuska	504	Feb 24, 2026	X-Men #43 cover: 978-1302967697
3	The Sentinels Live	1968-1971	X-Men #46–66; material from Ka-Zar #2–3, Marvel Tales #30	Roy Thomas, Arnold Drake	Neal Adams, Jim Steranko, Werner Roth	512	Nov 14, 2018	X-Men #49 cover: 978-1302912758
3	The Sentinels Live	1968-1971	X-Men #46–66; material from Ka-Zar #2–3, Marvel Tales #30	Roy Thomas, Arnold Drake	Neal Adams, Jim Steranko, Werner Roth	512	Apr 7, 2021	X-Men #49 cover: 978-1302928513
4	It's Always Darkest Before the Dawn	1970-1975	Material from X-Men #67-93; Amazing Adventures #11–17, and more: Amazing Spider-Man #92; Incredible Hulk #150, 161, 172, 180–182; Marvel Team-Up #4, 23; Avengers #110–111; Captain America #172–175; Defenders #15–16; Giant-Size Fantastic Four #4	Steve Englehart, Len Wein	Sal Buscema, Tom Sutton, Herb Trimpe, Gil Kane	512	Jul 17, 2019	Amazing Adventures #16 cover: 978-1302916039
4	It's Always Darkest Before the Dawn	1970-1975	Material from X-Men #67-93; Amazing Adventures #11–17, and more: Amazing Spider-Man #92; Incredible Hulk #150, 161, 172, 180–182; Marvel Team-Up #4, 23; Avengers #110–111; Captain America #172–175; Defenders #15–16; Giant-Size Fantastic Four #4	Steve Englehart, Len Wein	Sal Buscema, Tom Sutton, Herb Trimpe, Gil Kane	512	Jan 17, 2023	Amazing Adventures #16 cover: 978-1302950347
5	Second Genesis	1975-1978	Giant Size X-Men #1; X-Men #94–110; Iron Fist #14–15; Marvel Team-Up #53, 69–70, Annual #1	Chris Claremont	Dave Cockrum John Byrne	528	Mar 29, 2017	X-Men #100 cover: 978-1302903909
5	Second Genesis	1975-1978	Giant Size X-Men #1; X-Men #94–110; Iron Fist #14–15; Marvel Team-Up #53, 69–70, Annual #1	Chris Claremont	Dave Cockrum John Byrne	528	May 9, 2023	X-Men #100 cover: 978-1302950453
6	Proteus	1978-1980	X-Men #111–128, Annual #3; Incredible Hulk Annual #7; Marvel Team-Up #89	Chris Claremont	John Byrne	440	Aug 26, 2020	X-Men #114 cover: 978-1302922528
6	Proteus	1978-1980	X-Men #111–128, Annual #3; Incredible Hulk Annual #7; Marvel Team-Up #89	Chris Claremont	John Byrne	440	Sep 12, 2023	X-Men #114 cover: 978-1302950538
7	The Fate of the Phoenix	1980-1981	X-Men #129–143, Annual #4; Phoenix: The Untold Story (1984); material from Marvel Treasury Edition #26–27, Marvel Team-Up #100	Chris Claremont	John Byrne	480	Mar 16, 2021	X-Men #136 cover: 978-1302922535
7	The Fate of the Phoenix	1980-1981	X-Men #129–143, Annual #4; Phoenix: The Untold Story (1984); material from Marvel Treasury Edition #26–27, Marvel Team-Up #100	Chris Claremont	John Byrne	480	Jul 25, 2023	X-Men #136 cover: 978-1302950507
8	I, Magneto	1981-1982	Uncanny X-Men #144–153, Annual #5; Avengers Annual #10; Bizarre Adventures #27; material from Marvel Fanfare #1–4	Chris Claremont	Dave Cockrum, Michael Golden	480	Nov 30, 2021	Uncanny X-Men #150 cover: 978-1302929527
9	The Brood Saga	1982-1983	Uncanny X-Men #154–167, Annual #6; material from Special Edition X-Men #1	Chris Claremont	Dave Cockrum, Paul Smith	424	Dec 26, 2023	Uncanny X-Men #166 cover: 978-1302948818
10	God Loves, Man Kills	1982-1983	Uncanny X-Men #168–175, Annual #7; Marvel Graphic Novel #5 - God Loves, Man Kills; Wolverine #1–4	Chris Claremont	Paul Smith, Brent Anderson, Frank Miller	488	Dec 24, 2024	Uncanny X-Men #173 cover: 978-1302955595
11	Lifedeath	1983-1985	Uncanny X-Men #176-188; Kitty Pryde And Wolverine #1-6; material from Marvel Fanfare #40 (1988)	Chris Claremont	John Romita Jr., Al Milgrom	496	Jan 13, 2026	Uncanny X-Men #185 cover: 978-1302960643
12	The Gift	1984-1986	Uncanny X-Men #189–198, Annual #8; X-Men and Alpha Flight #1–2; Nightcrawler #1–4	Chris Claremont	John Romita Jr., Paul Smith, Dave Cockrum	512	Dec 23, 2015	Uncanny X-Men #197 cover: 978-0785192176
12	The Gift	1984-1986	Uncanny X-Men #189–198, Annual #8; X-Men and Alpha Flight #1–2; Nightcrawler #1–4	Chris Claremont	John Romita Jr., Paul Smith, Dave Cockrum	512	Jun 11, 2024	Uncanny X-Men #197 cover: 978-1302957940
13	Wounded Wolf	1985-1986	Uncanny X-Men #199-210, Annual #9-10; New Mutants Special Edition #1; Marvel Fanfare #33 (1987)	Chris Claremont	John Romita Jr., Art Adams, June Brigman, Barry Windsor-Smith	496	Oct 14, 2025	Uncanny X-Men #210 cover: 978-1302966010
14	Mutant Massacre	1986-1987	Uncanny X-Men #211-219; Spider-Man Vs. Wolverine; Fantastic Four Vs. X-Men #1-4; X-Men Vs. Avengers #1-4	Chris Claremont, Christopher Priest, Roger Stern	Marc Silvestri, Jon Bogdanove, Mark Bright	504	Jun 30, 2026	Uncanny X-Men #212 cover: 978-1302968007
15	Fall of the Mutants	1987-1988	Uncanny X-Men #220-234, Annual #11-12; Best of Marvel Comics 1987	Chris Claremont	Marc Silvestri	496	Jan 19, 2027	Uncanny X-Men #229 cover: 978-1302969790
17	Dissolution and Rebirth	1989-1990	Uncanny X-Men #248–267	Chris Claremont	Jim Lee, Marc Silvestri, Bill Jaaska, Mike Collins	488	Aug 14, 2019	Uncanny X-Men #254 cover: 978-1302918477
17	Dissolution and Rebirth	1989-1990	Uncanny X-Men #248–267	Chris Claremont	Jim Lee, Marc Silvestri, Bill Jaaska, Mike Collins	488	Sep 6, 2022	Uncanny X-Men #254 cover: 978-1302946814
19	Mutant Genesis	1991	Uncanny X-Men #278–280, Annual #15; X-Factor #65–70; X-Men (vol. 2) #1–3; material from New Mutants Annual #7 and X-Factor Annual #6	Fabian Nicieza, Chris Claremont	Whilce Portacio, Jim Lee, Andy Kubert	472	Nov 29, 2017	X-Factor #67 cover: 978-1302903916
19	Mutant Genesis	1991	Uncanny X-Men #278–280, Annual #15; X-Factor #65–70; X-Men (vol. 2) #1–3; material from New Mutants Annual #7 and X-Factor Annual #6	Fabian Nicieza, Chris Claremont	Whilce Portacio, Jim Lee, Andy Kubert	472	Jul 6, 2021	X-Factor #67 cover: 978-1302929992
19	Mutant Genesis	1991	Uncanny X-Men #278–280, Annual #15; X-Factor #65–70; X-Men (vol. 2) #1–3; material from New Mutants Annual #7 and X-Factor Annual #6	Fabian Nicieza, Chris Claremont	Whilce Portacio, Jim Lee, Andy Kubert	472	Apr 22, 2025	X-Factor #67 cover: 978-1302963934
20	Bishop's Crossing	1991-1992	Uncanny X-Men #281–288, Annual #16; X-Men (vol. 2) #4–9, Annual #1; Ghost Rider (vol. 3) #26–27	Jim Lee, Fabian Nicieza, John Byrne, Scott Lobdell	Jim Lee, Whilce Portacio	512	Mar 29, 2022	Uncanny X-Men #281 cover: 978-1302934521
20	Bishop's Crossing	1991-1992	Uncanny X-Men #281–288, Annual #16; X-Men (vol. 2) #4–9, Annual #1; Ghost Rider (vol. 3) #26–27	Jim Lee, Fabian Nicieza, John Byrne, Scott Lobdell	Jim Lee, Whilce Portacio	512	Jan 20, 2026	Uncanny X-Men #281 cover: 978-1302967635
21	The X-Cutioner's Song	1992-1993	Uncanny X-Men #289–296; X-Men (vol. 2) #10–16; X-Factor #84–86; X-Force #16–18	Scott Lobdell, Fabian Nicieza	Tom Raney, Brendan Peterson, Andy Kubert	520	Dec 13, 2022	X-Men (vol. 2) #11 cover: 978-1302948283
21	The X-Cutioner's Song	1992-1993	Uncanny X-Men #289–296; X-Men (vol. 2) #10–16; X-Factor #84–86; X-Force #16–18	Scott Lobdell, Fabian Nicieza	Tom Raney, Brendan Peterson, Andy Kubert	520	Sep 22, 2026	X-Men (vol. 2) #11 cover: 978-1302967888
22	Legacies	1993	Uncanny X-Men #297–300, Annual #17; X-Men (vol. 2) #17–23; X-Men Unlimited #1; Stryfe's Strike File	Scott Lobdell, Fabian Nicieza	Brandon Peterson, Andy Kubert, John Romita Jr., Chris Bachalo	488	Apr 11, 2023	X-Men (vol. 2) #20 cover: 978-1302951115
23	Fatal Attractions	1993-1994	Uncanny X-Men #301–306; X-Men (vol. 2) #24–25; X-Men Unlimited #2; Wolverine #75; Gambit #1–4; X-Men: Survival Guide to the Mansion	Scott Lobdell, Fabian Nicieza, Howard Mackie	John Romita Jr., Lee Weeks	520	Apr 23, 2024	X-Men (vol. 2) #24 cover: 978-1302956851
Jump to: New X-Men Modern Era Epic Collection
Jump to: Astonishing X-Men Modern Era Epic Collection

== Modern Era Epic Collections ==
Marvel's "Modern Era" has never been specifically defined, however, when Marvel Knights launched in 1998, it was described as "the first wave of Marvel's renaissance". The imprint was launched partly as a way to redefine the company, following Marvel's bankruptcy - and was "a major factor behind the revival of Marvel Comics".

The first Modern Era Epic Collection was solicited by Marvel in December 2022. Spider-Gwen: Ghost Spider - Edge of Spider-Verse was released in May 2023 to coincide with the release of the Spider-Man: Across the Spider-Verse movie.

=== All-New Wolverine ===
Laura Kinney - or X-23 - was originally introduced in the television series, X-Men Evolution. Her first comics appearance was in the 2003 NYX series as a clone of Wolverine. Tom Taylor's new take on the character launched at the end of 2015, exploring Kinney's relationship with her cloned sisters.

#	Subtitle	Years covered	Issues collected	Writers	Artists	Pages	Released	ISBN
1	The Four Sisters	2015-2017	All-New Wolverine #1-18, Annual (2016)	Tom Taylor	David López, David Navarrot, Marcio Takara, Ig Guara, Nik Virella, Djibril Morissette-Phan	472	Dec 2, 2025	All-New Wolverine #1 cover: 978-1302966041
2	Orphans Of X	2017-2018	All-New Wolverine #19-35; Generations: Wolverine & All-New Wolverine #1	Tom Taylor	Leonard Kirk, Juann Cabal, Marco Failla, Djibril Morissette-Phan & Ramon Rosanas	416	Dec 29, 2026	All-New Wolverine #19 cover: 978-1302969721

=== Amazing Spider-Man ===
The character's modern era begins with J. Michael Straczynski, who wrote The Amazing Spider-Man for six years from 2001. His first arc, Coming Home, introduced the villain Morlun, and saw Peter Parker's Aunt May discover his alter-ego.

Later, the writer attempted to reinvent parts of Spider-Man's origin, with storylines such as Spider-Totem and The Other. He caused controversy with the Sins Past storyline, which involved Gwen Stacy – then navigated the Civil War event, before finishing with One More Day, which saw Peter's marriage to Mary-Jane removed from history.

Every volume so far is a direct port of a previous Complete Collection into the Modern Epic line.

Title lettering: Red
#	Subtitle	Years covered	Issues collected	Legacy	Writers	Artists	Pages	Released	ISBN
Jump to: Amazing Spider-Man Epic Collection
1	Coming Home	2001-2002	Amazing Spider-Man (vol. 2) #30-45	#471-486	J. Michael Straczynski	John Romita Jr., J. Scott Campbell	392	Apr 29, 2025	Amazing Spider-Man (vol. 2) #43 cover: 978-1302964450
2	The Life and Death of Spiders	2002-2003	Amazing Spider-Man (vol. 2) #46-58, 500–502	#487-502	J. Michael Straczynski, Fiona Avery	John Romita Jr., John Romita Sr.	416	Jan 6, 2026	Amazing Spider-Man #500 cover: 978-1302965402
3	Sins Past	2004-2005	Amazing Spider-Man #503-518, 509 (Director's Cut)	#503-518	J. Michael Straczynski, Fiona Kai Avery	John Romita Jr., Mike Deodato Jr., Mark Brooks	408	Apr 28, 2026	Amazing Spider-Man #509 cover: 978-1302967086
4	The Other	2005-2006	Amazing Spider-Man #519–528; Friendly Neighborhood Spider-Man #1–4; Marvel Knights Spider-Man #19–22; Spider-Man: The Other Sketchbook	#519-528	J. Michael Straczynski, Peter David, Reginald Hudlin	Mike Deodato Jr., Mike Wieringo & Pat Lee	472	Jan 26, 2027	Amazing Spider-Man (vol. 2) #520 cover: 978-1302967130
14	Big Time	2010-2011	Amazing Spider-Man #648 (A story), 649–662, 654.1	#648-662	Dan Slott, Christos N. Gage	Humberto Ramos, Reilly Brown	512	Sep 23, 2025	Amazing Spider-Man #648 cover: 978-1302965839
15	Spider-Island	2011-2012	Amazing Spider-Man #663-676; Amazing Spider-Man: Infested; FCBD: Spider-Man (2011); Spider-Island: Deadly Foes	#663-676	Dan Slott	Humberto Ramos, Giuseppe Camuncoli, Barry Kitson	448	Sep 8, 2026	Amazing Spider-Man (vol. 2) #667 cover: 978-1302967123
16	Ends of the Earth	2012	Amazing Spider-Man #677-687, 679.1; Daredevil #8; Avenging Spider Man #8; Amazing Spider-Man: Ends of the Earth #1	#677-687	Mark Waid, Dan Slott, Christopher Yost, Brian Clevinger, Rob Williams & Ty Templeton	Emma Rios, Haim Kano, Humberto Ramos, Matthew Clark, Giuseppe Camuncoli, Stefano Caselli & Thony Silas	352	Feb 2, 2027	Amazing Spider-Man (vol. 2) #683 cover: 978-1302970871

=== Annihilation ===
Annihilation is the first Marvel Event to be published as an Epic Collection. The contents of the first volume are identical to 2018's Complete Collection. The event leads into the beginning of 2008's Guardians of the Galaxy reboot.

#	Subtitle	Years covered	Issues collected	Writers	Artists	Pages	Released	ISBN
1	Annihilation Day	2005-2006	Drax the Destroyer (2005) #1-4; Annihilation: Prologue (2006); Annihilation: Nova (2006) #1-4; Annihilation: Silver Surfer (2006) #1-4; Annihilation: Super Skrull (2006) #1-4	Keith Giffen, Dan Abnett, Andy Lanning, Javier Grillo-Marxuach	Mitch Breitweiser, Ariel Olivetti, Scott Kolins, Kev Walker, Renato Arlem, Gregory Titus	472	Jun 10, 2025	Annihilation: Prologue cover: 978-1302963255
2	Desperate Measures	2006-2007	Annihilation: Ronan (2006) #1-4; Annihilation (2006) #1-6; Annihilation: Heralds Of Galactus (2006) #1-2; Annihilation: Nova Corps Files (2006)	Keith Giffen, Simon Furman, Christos N. Gage, Stuart Moore	Andrea Di Vito, Jorge Lucas, Giuseppe Camuncoli, Mike McKone, Scott Kolins	408	Oct 7, 2025	Annihilation #1 cover: 978-1302963262
3	Conquest Prelude	2007-2008	Annihilation: Conquest Prologue; Annihilation: Conquest - Quasar #1-4; Annihilation: Conquest - Starlord #1-4; Annihilation: Saga; Nova (vol. 4) #1-7	Christos N. Gage, Keith Giffen, TBC	Mike Lilly, Timothy Green II, TBC	440	Jun 9, 2026	Annihilation: Conquest Prologue cover: 978-1302967116
4	Conquest	2007-2008	Annihilation: Conquest - Wraith #1-4; Nova (vol. 4) #8-12, and Annual #1; Annihilation: Conquest #1-6			416	Jun 22, 2027	Annihilation: Conquest #6 cover: 978-1302971854

=== Astonishing X-Men ===
The first two Astonishing X-Men volumes contains the entire 25-issue run from Joss Whedon and John Cassaday. For the most part, the series continued Grant Morrison's New X-Men series, while ignoring much of Marvel's ongoing continuity.

Title lettering: Orange-yellow
#	Subtitle	Years covered	Issues collected	Writers	Artists	Pages	Released	ISBN
1	Gifted	2004-2005	Astonishing X-Men (vol. 3) #1-12	Joss Whedon	John Cassaday	320	Mar 26, 2024	Astonishing X-Men (vol. 3) #1 variant cover: 978-1302957971
2	Unstoppable	2006-2008	Astonishing X-Men (vol. 3) #13-24; Giant-Size Astonishing X-Men #1	Joss Whedon	John Cassaday	344	Mar 4, 2025	Astonishing X-Men (vol. 3) #13 cover: 978-1302961114

=== Black Widow ===
Title lettering: Red
#	Subtitle	Years covered	Issues collected	Writers	Artists	Pages	Released	ISBN
Jump to: Black Widow Epic Collection
1	The Itsy-Bitsy Spider	1999-2006	Black Widow (1999) #1-3, Black Widow (2001) #1-3, Black Widow: Pale Little Spider (2002) #1-3, Black Widow (2004) #1-6, Black Widow: The Things They Say About Her (2005) #1-6	Devin Grayson, Greg Rucka, Richard Morgan	Jeffrey Glen Jones, Scott Hampton, Igor Kordey, Bill Sienkiewicz, Goran Parlov, Sean Phillips	512	Apr 15, 2025	Black Widow (1999) #1 cover: 978-1302964061
2	Widowmaker	2009-2014	Black Widow Deadly Origin #1-4; Black Widow (vol. 4) #1-8; Widowmaker #1-4; Fear Itself: Black Widow; Black Widow Saga; material from Enter The Heroic Age; Iron Man: Kiss And Kill	Paul Cornell, Marjorie Liu, Duane Swierczynski, Jim Mccann	Tom Raney, John Paul Leon, Daniel Acuña, Manuel Garcia, David López	464	Apr 14, 2026	Black Widow: Deadly Origin #1 cover: 978-1302967079
3	Chaos	2014-2015	Black Widow (vol. 5) #1-20; Punisher (vol. 10) #9; material from All-New Marvel Now! Point One #1	Nathan Edmondson	Phil Noto, Mitch Gerads	472	Apr 9, 2024	Black Widow Vol. 5 #18 cover: 978-1302956431

=== Captain America ===
The modern era of Captain America starts with writer Ed Brubaker's eight-year run. The first two volumes include the return of Bucky Barnes as The Winter Soldier, and the death of Captain America following Civil War.

The storyline was not only "one of the best-selling comics of the decade" but also "perhaps one of the best moves that Marvel could have made ... (as it) provided the perfect opportunity for the gravity of the Civil War's outcome to be felt".

Title lettering: Light blue
#	Subtitle	Years covered	Issues collected	Legacy	Writers	Artists	Pages	Released	ISBN
Jump to: Captain America Epic Collection
1	The Winter Soldier	2004-2006	Captain America (vol. 5) #1-17; Captain America 65th Anniversary Special; Captain America: Winter Soldier Director's Cut	#550-566	Ed Brubaker	Steve Epting, Michael Lark, John Paul Leon, Lee Weeks, Javier Pulido, Marcos Martin	472	Jun 18, 2024	Captain America (vol. 5) #14 cover: 978-1302956387
2	Death of the Dream	2006-2007	Captain America (vol. 5) #18-30; Captain America #25: Director's Cut; Winter Soldier: Winter Kills; Fallen Son: The Death Of Captain America #1-5	#567-579	Ed Brubaker, Jeph Loeb	Steve Epting, Mike Perkins, Lee Weeks, Leinil Francis Yu, Ed McGuinness, John Romita Jr, David Finch, John Cassaday	520	Oct 22, 2024	Fallen Son: The Death Of Captain America #3 cover: 978-1302956455
3	The Burden of Dreams	2007-2008	Captain America (vol. 5) #31-48, #34 Director's Cut	#580-597	Ed Brubaker	Steve Epting, Luke Ross, Butch Guice, Mike Perkins, Roberto De La Torre	480	Oct 7, 2025	Captain America Vol. 5 #41 cover: 978-1302956486
4	Reborn	2008-2010	Captain America (vol. 5) #49-50; 600–601; Captain America Reborn #1-6; Captain America Reborn: Who Will Wield The Shield?	#598-601	Ed Brubaker	Bryan Hitch, Butch Guice, Luke Ross, Gene Colan	456	Oct 13, 2026	Captain America Reborn #1 cover: 978-1302970048

=== Carnage ===
#	Subtitle	Years covered	Issues collected	Writers	Artists	Pages	Released	ISBN
Jump to: Carnage Epic Collection
1	Carnage U.S.A.	2010-2013	Carnage (2010) #1-5; Carnage U.S.A. #1-5; Minimum Carnage: Alpha; Scarlet Spider (2012) #10-11; Venom (2011) #26-27; Minimum Carnage: Omega; Superior Carnage #1-5	Zeb Wells, Kevin Shinick, Cullen Bunn, Kevin Shinick	Clayton Crain, Stephen Segovia, Lan Medina, Khoi Pham, Declan Shalvey	472	Sep 30, 2025	Carnage, U.S.A. #1 cover: 978-1302965846
2	Prophecy of the Darkhold	2014-2016	Superior Carnage Annual (2014); Deadpool vs. Carnage #1-4; AXIS: Carnage #1-3; Nova #26-27; Carnage (vol. 2) #1-10; All-New, All-Different Point One #1 (Carnage Story)	Cullen Bunn, Rick Spears, Gerry Duggan, Gerry Conway	Mike Henderson, Aaron Kim Jacinto, Sala Espin, Germán Peralta, John Timms Moreira, Michael Perkins	472	Sep 15, 2026	Carnage (vol. 2) #10 cover: 978-1302970031

=== Daredevil ===
In 1998, Daredevil was cancelled and relaunched, with a new #1 - plus filmmaker Kevin Smith as writer and Joe Quesada as artist. This relaunch "set the tone for the entire Marvel Knights line, directly inspired subsequent depictions of the character in film and television and set the template for how to relaunch a Marvel character."

The rest of the volume was dominated by Brian Michael Bendis' 55 issues, then 33 from Ed Brubaker. Bendis' run starts with Volume 2: Underboss; Brubaker's with Volume 6: The Devil in Cell-Block D

- See also: Daredevil collected editions

Title lettering: Dark red
#	Subtitle	Years covered	Issues collected	Legacy	Writers	Artists	Pages	Released	ISBN
Jump to: Daredevil Epic Collection
1	Guardian Devil	1998-2000	Daredevil (vol. 2) #0-15, 1/2	#381-395	Kevin Smith, David Mack	Joe Quesada	440	Feb 23, 2027	Daredevil (vol. 2) #1 cover: 978-1302972141
2	Underboss	2000-2002	Daredevil (vol. 2) #16-31; Daredevil: Ninja #1-3	#396-411	Brian Michael Bendis, Bob Gale	Rob Haynes, David Mack, Phil Winslade, Dave Ross, Alex Maleev	472	Feb 27, 2024	Daredevil (vol. 2) #26 cover: 978-1302956332
3	Out	2002-2003	Daredevil (vol. 2) #32-50	#412-430	Brian Michael Bendis	Alex Maleev, Manuel Gutierrez, Terry Dodson	448	Oct 15, 2024	Daredevil (vol. 2) #36 cover: 978-1302956370
4	King of Hell's Kitchen	2003-2004	Daredevil (vol. 2) #51-65; What If... Karen Page Had Lived? (2004)	#431-445	Brian Michael Bendis, David Mack	Alex Maleev, Michael Golden, Greg Horn, Philip Russell, Phil Hester, Chris Bachalo, Michael Lark	408	Feb 11, 2025	Daredevil (vol. 2) #65 cover: 978-1302956424
5	The Murdock Papers	2004-2006	Daredevil (vol. 2) #66-81	#446-461	Brian Michael Bendis	Alex Maleev	432	Feb 24, 2026	Daredevil (vol. 2) #66 cover: 978-1302966966
6	The Devil in Cell-Block D	2006-2007	Daredevil (vol. 2) #82-94, Annual (2007)	#462-474	Ed Brubaker	Michael Lark, Ande Parks, David Aja, Lee Weeks, Leandro Fernández	376	Jul 1, 2025	Daredevil (vol. 2) #86 cover: 978-1302964337

=== Dark Avengers ===
Dark Avengers was a 2009 spin-off from Brian Michael Bendis' main New Avengers book, following the events of the Secret Invasion event. It saw Norman Osborn take charge of a revamped Avengers team, crossing over with the Utopia event, before concluding with Siege.

Title lettering: Purple
#	Subtitle	Years covered	Issues collected	Writers	Artists	Pages	Released	ISBN
1	Osborn's Reign	2009-2010	Dark Avengers #1-16, Annual #1; Dark Avengers / Uncanny X-Men: Utopia; Dark Avengers / Uncanny X-Men: Exodus; Uncanny X-Men #513-514	Brian Michael Bendis, Matt Fraction	Mike Deodato, Marc Silvestri, Terry Dodson, Luke Ross, Greg Horn, Chris Bachalo	552	Jan 30, 2024	Dark Avengers #1 second printing cover: 978-1302952709

=== Deadpool & Cable ===
Even though the individual comic issues are named Cable & Deadpool, the collected Modern Era Epic line is called Deadpool & Cable. Marvel's legacy numbering for Deadpool continues from the original Epic Collection, through the Deadpool & Cable books, then onto Deadpool's Modern Era Epics.

Title lettering: Red
#	Subtitle	Years covered	Issues collected	Legacy	Writers	Artists	Pages	Released	ISBN
Jump to: Deadpool Epic Collection
1	Ballistic Bromance	2004-2005	Cable & Deadpool #1-18	#93-110	Fabian Nicieza	Patch Zircher, Mark Brooks, Marvin Law	424	Aug 7, 2024	Cable & Deadpool #1 cover: 978-1302960902

=== Deadpool ===
The legacy numbering of the Deadpool books means these Modern Era Epics take place directly after the Deadpool And Cable line.

Title lettering: Red
#	Subtitle	Years covered	Issues collected	Legacy	Writers	Artists	Pages	Released	ISBN
Jump to: Deadpool Epic Collection
1	Magnum Opus	2008-2009	Wolverine: Origins #21-25; Deadpool (vol. 3) #1-12; Thunderbolts #130-131	#143-154	Daniel Way	Paco Medina, Steve Dillon	472	Jan 13, 2026	Deadpool (vol. 3) #1 cover: 978-1302965419
2	X X Baby	2009-2010	Deadpool (vol. 3) #13-31	#155-173	Daniel Way, Duane Swierczynski	Shawn Crystal, Paco Medina, Carlo Barberi, Tan Eng Huat, Philip Bond, Bong Dazo	464	Jul 7, 2026	Deadpool (vol. 3) #17 cover: 978-1302967147
3	Evil Deadpool	2010-2012	Deadpool (vol. 3) #32-49, #33.1, #49.1	#174-191			448	Apr 6, 2027	Deadpool (vol. 3) #47 cover: 978-1302970925
5	In Wade We Trust	2012-2013	Deadpool (vol. 4) #1-19	#206-224	Brian Posehn, Gerry Duggan	Tony Moore, Scott Koblish, Mike Hawthorne, Declan Shalvey	448	May 6, 2025	Deadpool (vol. 4) #15 cover: 978-1302964511

=== Guardians of the Galaxy ===
Despite the same name, the Modern Era Guardians of the Galaxy are largely separate from the 1960s version. Regardless of this, Marvel considers both versions part of the same legacy numbering. The 2008 team line-up - Star-Lord, Rocket Raccoon, Groot, Phyla-Vell, Gamora, Drax the Destroyer, and Adam Warlock - first came together during the Annihilation: Conquest event.

Title lettering: Light blue
#	Subtitle	Years covered	Issues collected	Legacy	Writers	Artists	Pages	Released	ISBN
1	Somebody's Got to Do It	2007-2009	Annihilation: Conquest - Star-Lord #1-4, Guardians of the Galaxy (vol. 2) #1-12	#63-74	Keith Giffen, Dan Abnett, Andy Lanning	Timothy Green II, Paul Pelletier, Brad Walker, Carlos Magno, Wes Craig	416	Sep 19, 2023	Guardians of the Galaxy (vol. 2) #1 cover: 978-1302953751
2	War of Kings	2009-2010	Guardians of the Galaxy (vol. 2) #13-25; Thanos Imperative: Ignition #1; Thanos Imperative #1-6	#75-87	Dan Abnett, Andy Lanning	Brad Walker, Wes Craig, Miguel Sepulveda	488	Jan 7, 2025	Guardians of the Galaxy (vol. 2) #20 cover: 978-1302959968
3	Annihilators	2010-2011	The Thanos Imperative: Devastation #1; Annihilators #1-4; Annihilators: Earthfall #1-4; Thanos Sourcebook	No legacy issues	Dan Abnett & Andy Lanning	Miguel Angel Sepulveda, Tan Eng Huat & Timothy Green II	360	Dec 8, 2026	Annihilators #1 cover: 978-1302969868

=== Hawkeye ===
The modern era of Hawkeye releases begin later than almost any other character. Spider-Girl's first volume starts with an issue from 1997, while Hawkeye doesn't kick off until 2009.

The Clint Barton version of the character was killed during 2004's Avengers Disassembled event, though returned to the team as Ronin in New Avengers. His separate Modern Era series begins after the events of Secret Invasion, in which his wife, Mockingbird, returns.

Title lettering: Purple
#	Subtitle	Years covered	Issues collected	Writers	Artists	Pages	Released	ISBN
Jump to: Hawkeye Epic Collection
1	The Reunion	2009-2011	New Avengers: The Reunion #1-4; Hawkeye & Mockingbird #1-6; Widowmaker #1-4; Hawkeye: Blindspot #1-4; Hawkeye & Mockingbird Sketchbook #1; material from Dark Reign: New Nation #1; Enter the Heroic Age #1	Jim McCann, Duane Swierczynski	David Lopez, Manuel Garcia, Paco Diaz, Nick Dragotta, Valentine De Landro, Lee Weeks	480	Jul 2, 2024	Hawkeye: Blind Spot #1 cover: 978-1302956530

=== Hulk ===
The first twelve issues of Hulk volume 2 are part of The Incredible Hulk legacy numbering. Issues #13-57 feature Red Hulk and are not part of the Incredible Hulk legacy numbering. The series was renamed Red She-Hulk with #58 and lasted with that name until its cancellation. Marvel published Incredible Hulk #600 after Hulk volume 2 #12; however, they miscalculated the numbering and issue #600 should have been #599. They corrected this several years later when they restored the majority of their titles to their original legacy numbering in October of 2017.

Title lettering: Green
#	Subtitle	Years covered	Issues collected	Legacy	Writers	Artists	Pages	Released	ISBN
Jump to: Incredible Hulk Epic Collections
6	Who Is The Red Hulk?	2008-2009	Hulk (vol. 2) #1-12; King-Size Hulk #1; material from Incredible Hulk #600, Wolverine (vol. 3) #50	#587-599	Jeph Loeb	Ed McGuinness, Arthur Adams, Frank Cho, Herb Trimpe	440	May 7, 2024	Hulk (vol. 2) #1 cover: 978-1302956479
7	Code Red	2009	Hulk (vol. 2) #13-18; Incredible Hulk #601-605; Dark Reign: The List - Hulk; material from Incredible Hulk #600	#600-604	Jeph Loeb, Greg Pak, Fred Van Lente	Ed McGuinness, Ian Churchill, Whilce Portacio, Ariel Olivetti, Giuseppe Camuncoli, Ben Oliver, Michael Ryan	416	Jan 20, 2026	Incredible Hulk #600 cover: 978-1302966058
8	Fall Of The Hulks	2009-2010	Hulk (vol. 2) #19-21; Incredible Hulk #606-608; Fall Of The Hulks: Alpha; Fall Of The Hulks: Gamma; Fall Of The Hulks: Red Hulk #1-4; Fall Of The Hulks: Save She-Hulks #1-3; Fall Of The Hulks: MODOK	#605-607	Jeph Loeb, Greg Pak, Jeff Parker, Ryan Dunlavey	Ed McGuinness, Paul Pelletier, John Romita Jr., Carlos Rodriguez, Fernando Blanco, Salva Espin, Ryan Dunlavey	472	Nov 10, 2026	Fall of the Hulks: Gamma #1 cover: 978-1302970130
9	World War Hulks	2010	Hulk (vol. 2) #22-24; Incredible Hulk #609-611 (A Stories); World War Hulks #1; Hulked Out Heroes #1-2; World War Hulks: Spider-Man vs. Thor #1-2; World War Hulks: Captain America vs. Wolverine #1-2	#608-610	Jeph Loeb, Greg Pak, Jeff Parker, Kieron Gillen	Ed McGuinness, Paul Pelletier, Humberto Ramos, Jorge Molina	456	Feb 16, 2027	World War Hulks #1 cover: 9781302972455

=== Iron Man ===
Launching at the same time as Marvel's first Iron Man movie, volumes three to six of the character's modern era covers the Matt Fraction-Salvador Larroca run on the title. Readers "were treated to a version of Tony [Stark] that embraced his mistakes and flaws", plus arcs which were "filled with stories that pushed the Armored Avenger to his limit, and revealed new layers to the tortured genius underneath the suit". The Iron Man legacy numbering was incorrectly calculated when issue #500 was released in March of 2011 and was later corrected in October of 2017.

Title lettering: Yellow
#	Subtitle	Years covered	Issues collected	Legacy	Writers	Artists	Pages	Released	ISBN
Jump to: Iron Man Epic Collection
3	World's Most Wanted	2008-2009	Invincible Iron Man (vol. 2) #1-19	#470-488	Matt Fraction	Salvador Larroca	496	Jun 4, 2024	Invincible Iron Man (vol. 2) #8 cover: 978-1302956646
4	Stark Disassembled	2009-2010	Invincible Iron Man (vol. 2) #20-33; Iron Man: Requiem #1; Rescue #1; FCBD 2010 Iron Man/Thor	#489-502	Matt Fraction, Kelly Sue DeConnick	Salvador Larroca, Kano, Andrea Mutti, John Romita Jr, Jamie McKelvie	488	Dec 24, 2024	Invincible Iron Man (vol. 2) #25 Larroca variant cover: 978-1302959951
5	The New Iron Age	2010-2011	Invincible Iron Man (vol. 2) 500 (A story), #500.1, 501–509; Invincible Iron Man Annual (2010); Fear Itself (2011) #7.3: Iron Man	#503-512	Matt Fraction	Salvador Larroca, Carmine Di Giandomenico, Kano, Howard Chaykin	416	Jul 15, 2025	Invincible Iron Man (vol. 2) #501 cover: 978-1302964092
6	The Future	2012	Invincible Iron Man (vol. 2) #510-527	#513-530	Matt Fraction	Salvador Larroca	392	Jul 14, 2026	Invincible Iron Man (vol. 2) #527 cover: 978-1302968854

=== Loki ===
The first two Modern Era Loki volumes were released at the same time as the Disney+ series of the same name.

Title lettering: Green
#	Subtitle	Years covered	Issues collected	Writers	Artists	Pages	Released	ISBN
1	Journey into Mystery	2010-2011	Siege: Loki; Journey Into Mystery #622-636, 626.1	Kieron Gillen, Robert Rodi	Jamie McKelvie, Doug Braithwaite, Pasqual Ferry, Richard Elson, Whilce Portacio, Mitchell Breitweiser	416	Aug 15, 2023	Siege: Loki cover: 978-1302952594
2	Everything Burns	2012	Journey Into Mystery #637-645; Exiled #1; New Mutants (vol. 2) #42-43; Mighty Thor #18-21; material from A+X #5	Kieron Gillen, Dan Abnett, Andy Lanning, Matt Fraction,	Carmine Di Giandomenico, Richard Elson, Alan Davis, Stephanie Hans, Joe Bennett	384	Sep 5, 2023	Journey Into Mystery #644 cover: 978-1302952655

=== Miles Morales: Spider-Man ===
Miles Morales was created by Brian Michael Bendis and debuted in Ultimate Fallout #4 from 2011.

The first three Modern Era Epic Collections, have the same content and page count as 2015's Ultimate Collection line. All three volumes take place in Marvel's Ultimate Universe, labelled Earth-1610, before the character moved to the company's main Earth-616 multiverse.

- See also: Miles Morales collected editions

Title lettering: Red
#	Subtitle	Years covered	Issues collected	Writers	Artists	Pages	Released	ISBN
1	Hero In Training	2011-2012	Ultimate Comics Spider-Man (2011) #1-12; Spider-Men (2012) #1-5; material from Ultimate Fallout (2011) #4	Brian Michael Bendis	Sara Pichelli, Chris Samnee, David Marquez	400	Mar 11, 2025	Ultimate Comics Spider-Man #1 Pichelli variant cover: 978-1302961053
2	Spider-Man No More	2012-2013	Ultimate Comics Spider-Man (2011) #13-28, 16.1	Brian Michael Bendis	David Marquez, Pepe Larraz, Sara Pichelli	384	Aug 26, 2025	Ultimate Comics Spider-Man #23 cover: 978-1302961060
3	Revivals and Revelations	2013-2015	Cataclysm: Ultimate Spider-Man (2013) #1-3; Ultimate Spider-Man #200; Miles Morales: Ultimate Spider-Man #1-12	Brian Michael Bendis	David Marquez, Mark Bagley, Mark Brooks, Sara Pichelli, David Lafuente	368	Jan 27, 2026	Miles Morales: Ultimate Spider-Man #3 1:25 cover: 978-1302961077
4	Sitting in a Tree	2015-2016	Spider-Man (vol. 2) #1-14; Spider-Gwen (vol. 2) #16-18	Brian Michael Bendis, Jason Latour	Sara Pichelli, Robbi Rodriguez, TBC	392	Aug 25, 2026	Spider-Man (vol. 2) #10 cover: 978-1302970024
5	Sinister Six Reborn	2016-2017	Spider-Man (vol. 2) #15-21, #234-240; Spider-Men II #1-5; Generations: Miles Morales Spider-Man & Peter Parker Spider-Man #1	Brian Michael Bendis	Szymon Kudranski, Jan Bazaldua, Nico Leon, Sara Pichelli & Ramón	464	Apr 27, 2027	Spider-Man (vol. 2) #240 cover: 978-1302972080

=== New Avengers ===
The first four New Avengers volumes have been solicited with the same contents, and page count, as the previously released New Avengers by Brian Michael Bendis Complete Collections from 2017.

Bendis relaunched The Avengers with the 2004 event Avengers Disassembled, which is included in the first Modern Era Epic. He wrote New Avengers for seven-and-a-half-years, alongside sister series Mighty Avengers, (2007–2010), and Dark Avengers (2009–2013).

The run is entwined with a series of Marvel events, including House of M (2005, written by Bendis), Civil War (2006–07, Mark Millar), Secret Invasion (2008, Bendis), Siege (2010, Bendis), and culminates with Avengers vs. X-Men (2012, co-written by Bendis).

Title lettering: Orange
#	Subtitle	Years covered	Issues collected	Legacy	Writers	Artists	Pages	Released	ISBN
Jump to: Avengers Epic Collection
1	Assembled	2004-2005	Avengers #500-503; Avengers Finale; New Avengers (vol. 1) #1-10; New Avengers #1 Director's Cut; New Avengers Most Wanted Files	#500-513	Brian Michael Bendis	David Finch, Steve McNiven	504	Aug 29, 2023	New Avengers #1 Quesada variant cover: 978-1302952617
2	Civil War	2005-2007	New Avengers #11-25, Annual (2006); New Avengers Guest Starring the Fantastic Four; Giant-Size Spider-Woman; New Avengers: Illuminati One-Shot; Civil War: The Confession	#514-528	Brian Michael Bendis, Dan Jurgens	David Finch, Frank Cho, Steve McNiven, Mike Deodato, Olivier Coipel, Alex Maleev, Howard Chaykin, Leinil Francis Yu, Pasqual Ferry, Jim Cheung	496	Dec 17, 2024	New Avengers #12 cover: 978-1302955816
3	The Initiative	2006-2008	Civil War: The Initiative; New Avengers #26-37, Annual (2006) #2; New Avengers: Illuminati #1-5	#529-540	Brian Michael Bendis, Warren Ellis, Brian Reed	Marc Silvestri, Alex Maleev, Leinil Yu, Carlo Pagulayan, Jim Cheung	464	May 13, 2025	New Avengers Annual #2 cover: 978-1302963842
4	Secret Invasion	2008-2009	New Avengers #38-54, Secret Invasion: Dark Reign	#541-557	Brian Michael Bendis	Michael Gaydos, David Mack, Jim Cheung, Billy Tan, Alex Maleev, Chris Bachalo	480	May 12, 2026	New Avengers #48 cover: 978-1302967093
5	Dark Reign		New Avengers #55-64; New Avengers Annual #3; Dark Reign: The List - Avengers; Free Comic Book Day 2009 (Avengers); New Avengers Finale #1; material from Amazing Spider-Man #601, and Breaking Into Comics the Marvel Way! #1	#558-567	Brian Michael Bendis		408	May 11, 2027	New Avengers Finale #1 cover: 978-1302970994

=== New X-Men ===
New X-Men ran for 44 issues from 2001 to 2004. It was written by Grant Morrison, with the majority of the art from Frank Quitely. The series numbering continued from the previous X-Men (vol. 2), despite the change in title.

Title lettering: Orange-yellow
#	Subtitle	Years covered	Issues collected	Writers	Artists	Pages	Released	ISBN
1	E Is for Extinction	2001-2002	New X-Men #114-126, Annual 2001	Grant Morrison	Frank Quitely, Leinil Yu, Ethan Van Sciver, Igor Kordey, Tom Derenick	376	Jun 25, 2024	New X-Men #114 cover: 978-1302957964
2	New Worlds	2002-2003	New X-Men #127-141	Grant Morrison	Frank Quitely, John Paul Leon, Igor Kordey, Phil Jimenez, Ethan van Sciver, Keron Grant	360	Jun 3, 2025	New X-Men #135 cover: 978-1302961268
3	Planet X	2003-2004	New X-Men #142-154	Grant Morrison	Chris Bachalo, Marc Silvestri, Phil Jimenez, TBC	336	Jun 2, 2026	New X-Men #144 cover: 978-1302967109

=== Spider-Girl ===
Mayday Parker debuted in What If... (vol. 2) #105, released on 17 December 1997. This makes it the earliest issue covered by the Modern Era Epic Collection line so far. The first full issue of the Spider-Girl series was released on 12 August 1998, with a cover date of 1 October.

The series takes place outside of the main Marvel continuity, on Earth-982.

Title lettering: Blue
#	Subtitle	Years covered	Issues collected	Writers	Artists	Pages	Released	ISBN
1	Legacy	1998-1999	What If? (vol. 2) #105; Spider-Girl (1998) #1-15, #½; Spider-Girl Annual 1999	Tom DeFalco	Bill Rosemann, Pat Olliffe, Ron Frenz, Paul Ryan	456	Mar 26, 2024	Spider-Girl #2 variant cover: 978-1302957957
5	Keeping the Faith	2004-2005	Spider-Girl #68-84	Tom DeFalco	Ron Frenz, Pat Olliffe	384	Nov 19, 2024	Spider-Girl #76 cover: 978-1302959821
6	Family Ties	2004-2006	Spider-Girl #85-99; material from #100 and Spider-Man Family #1	Tom DeFalco, Ron Frenz, Pat Olliffe	Ron Frenz, Pat Olliffe	400	Nov 18, 2025	Spider-Girl #92 cover: 978-1302966089
7	Comes the Carnage!	2006-2007	The Amazing Spider-Girl #0-15	Tom DeFalco	Ron Frenz, Pat Olliffe, John Romita, J. Scott Campbell	384	Aug 18, 2026	Amazing Spider-Girl #1 cover: 978-1302969776

=== Spider-Gwen: Ghost-Spider ===
Spider-Gwen initially appeared in Edge Of Spider-Verse #2, from 2014. The story explores a world in which Gwen Stacy was bitten by a radioactive spider, instead of Peter Parker. The character's first ongoing series was Spider-Gwen a year later, with the core stories taking place outside of main Marvel continuity, in the Earth-65 universe.

Edge of Spider-Verse, was the first release of Marvel's Modern Era line.

Title lettering: Pink
#	Subtitle	Years covered	Issues collected	Writers	Artists	Pages	Released	ISBN
1	Edge of Spider-Verse	2014-2016	Edge Of Spider-Verse #2; Spider-Gwen (vol. 1) #1-5; Spider-Gwen (vol. 2) #1-8; Spider-Women Alpha #1; Silk (vol. 2) #7-8; Spider-Woman (vol. 6) #6-7; Spider-Women Omega #1	Jason Latour, Dennis Hopeless, Kelly Thompson	Robbi Rodriguez, Bengal, Tana Ford, Joëlle Jones	480	May 1, 2023	Edge Of Spider-Verse #2 cover: 978-1302949983
2	Weapon of Choice	2016-2017	Spider-Gwen (vol. 2) #9-24, Annual #1; All-New Wolverine Annual #1; Spider-Man (vol. 2) #12-14	Jason Latour, Tom Taylor, Brian Michael Bendis	Hannah Blumenreich, Robbi Rodriguez, Chris Brunner, Chris Visions, Olivia Margraf, Marcio Takara, Sara Pichelli, Jorge Coelho, Jordan Gibson	496	Feb 20, 2024	Spider-Gwen (vol. 2) #20 cover: 978-1302956356
3	Gwenom	2017-2019	Spider-Gwen (vol. 2) #25-34; Spider-Geddon: Ghost Spider Video Comic; Spider-Gwen: Ghost-Spider #1-10	Jason Latour, Seanan McGuire	Robbi Rodriguez, Veronica Fish, Olivia Margraf, Chris Visions, Tim Eldred, Alti Firmansyah, Rosi Kämpe, Takeshi Miyazawa	464	Oct 14, 2025	Spider-Gwen: Ghost-Spider #1 cover: 978-1302965891
4	Into the Gwenverse	2019-2022	Ghost-Spider #1-10, Annual #1; King In Black: Gwenom vs. Carnage #1-3; Spider-Gwen: Gwenverse #1-5	Seanan McGuire, Tim Seeley	Takeshi Miyazawa, Flaviano Armentaro, Jodi Nishijima	456	Sep 29, 2026	Spider-Gwen: Gwenverse #1 cover: 978-1302969820

=== Spider-Man/Deadpool ===
Joe Kelly was Deadpool writer in 1997 when the character first got his own series. The writer introduced the concept of Deadpool breaking the fourth wall, although he left the book after 33 issues. After 19 years, Kelly returned to the character with Spider-Man/Deadpool, which ran for exactly 50 issues.

Title lettering: Red
#	Subtitle	Years covered	Issues collected	Writers	Artists	Pages	Released	ISBN
1	Isn't It Bromantic?	2016-2018	Spider-Man / Deadpool #1-14, 17–18, 1.MU	Joe Kelly, Scott Aukerman, Gerry Duggan, Penn Jillette, Paul Scheer, Nick Giovannetti, Joshua Corin	Ed McGuinness, Reilly Brown, Scott Koblish, Todd Nauck, David Walker	400	Oct 31, 2023	Spider-Man / Deadpool #13 cover: 978-1302951641
2	Til Death Do Us	2017-2018	Spider-Man / Deadpool #15-16, 19–32; Deadpool (vol. 5) #28-29; Deadpool And The Mercs For Money (vol. 2) #9-10	Gerry Duggan, Joshua Corin, Christopher Hastings, Elliott Kalan, Robbie Thompson	Salva Espin, Scott Koblish, Iban Coello, Will Robson, Todd Nauck, Chris Bachalo, Scott Hepburn, Elmo Bondoc	440	Sep 3, 2024	Spider-Man / Deadpool #31 cover: 978-1302959838
3	Road Trip	2019-2020	Spider-Man / Deadpool #33-50	Robbie Thompson	Matt Horak, Jim Towe, Scott Hepburn, Flaviano Armentaro, Nick Roche	416	Sep 2, 2025	Spider-Man / Deadpool #33 cover: 978-1302965600

=== Star Wars (canon) ===
The return of Star Wars comics rights to Marvel saw the continuity of previous releases reset to "Legends", with "any material published since April 2014 now considered canon." That means only the Modern Era releases are in the same world as the Star Wars films and television series.

==== Star Wars (ongoing) ====
The first issue of the 2015 Star Wars relaunch "exceeded one million copies sold on the direct market ... the top-selling single issue of the past 20 years." That version of the comic ran for 75 issues, exploring the time between Episode IV: A New Hope and Episode V: The Empire Strikes Back.

Charles Soule's 2020 relaunch ran for 50 issues, bridging the gap from Episode V until Episode VI: Return of the Jedi.

Title lettering: Yellow
#	Subtitle	Years covered	Issues collected	Writers	Artists	Pages	Released	ISBN
1	Skywalker Strikes	2015-2016	Star Wars (2015) #1-14, #1: Director's Cut; Star Wars: Vader Down #1; Darth Vader #13-15	Jason Aaron, Kieron Gillen	John Cassaday, Simone Bianchi, Stuart Immonen, Mike Deodato Jr, Salvador Larroca	488	Jul 23, 2024	Star Wars (2015) #1 cover: 978-1302956707
2	Yoda's Secret War	2015-2017	Star Wars (2015) #15-30, Annual #1-2	Jason Aaron, Kieron Gillen, Kelly Thompson	Salvador Larroca, Mike Mayhew, Leinil Francis Yu, Jorge Molina	448	Jul 22, 2025	Star Wars (2015) #27 cover: 978-1302964108
3	The Screaming Citadel	2017-2018	Star Wars (2015) #31-43, Annual #3; Star Wars: The Screaming Citadel; Star Wars: Doctor Aphra #7-8	Jason Aaron, Kieron Gillen	Salvador Larroca, Andrea Broccardo	424	Jul 21, 2026	Star Wars: Doctor Aphra #8 cover: 978-1302968885
4	Mutiny at Mon Cala	2018-2019	Star Wars (2015) #44-61	Kieron Gillen	Salvador Larroca, Giuseppe Camuncoli, Andrea Broccardo & Angel Unzueta Galarza	424	Feb 16, 2027	Star Wars (2015) #54 cover: 978-1302972158

==== Star Wars: Darth Vader ====
Kieron Gillen's 2015 Darth Vader series lasted 25 issues, filling the gap between Episode IV: A New Hope and Episode V: The Empire Strikes Back. Gillen wrote: "This was my story... Vader must fall from power in some way after A New Hope and then climb to whole new heights. My go-to reference was House of Cards - where a powerful man feels slighted and turns to methods that he would have previously avoided to reach whole new levels of power."

The series was relaunched in 2017 by writer Charles Soule, for a separate 25-issue run that immediately follows the events of Episode III: Revenge of the Sith.

It was relaunched a third time in 2020, for a 50-issue arc, with writer Greg Pak bridging Episode V: The Empire Strikes Back and Episode VI: Return of the Jedi.

Title lettering: Red
#	Subtitle	Years covered	Issues collected	Writers	Artists	Pages	Released	ISBN
1	Shadows and Secrets	2015	Darth Vader (2015) #1 Director's Cut; #2-12, Darth Vader Annual (2015)	Kieron Gillen	Salvador Larroca, Leinil Yu	352	Nov 26, 2024	Darth Vader Annual (2015) cover: 978-1302960100
2	Vader Down	2016-2017	Darth Vader (2015) #13-25, Vader Down; Star Wars (2015) #13-14	Kieron Gillen, Jason Aaron	Salvador Larroca, Max Fiumara, Mike Deodato Jr., Mike Norton	416	Nov 25, 2025	Darth Vader (2015) #13 cover: 978-1302966034
3	The Chosen One	2017-2018	Darth Vader (2017) #1-12, Annual 2	TBC	TBC	328	Nov 24, 2026	Darth Vader (2017) #2 cover: 978-1302969851
4	Fortress Vader		Darth Vader (2017) #13-25; Obi-Wan and Anakin #1-5				May 2027	

==== Star Wars: Kanan ====
Star Wars: Kanan is a standalone 12-issue series, following the character Kanan Jarrus, from the Star Wars Rebels animated series.

Spine lettering: Orange
Subtitle	Years covered	Issues collected	Writers	Artists	Pages	Released	ISBN
The Last Padawan	2015-2016	Kanan: The Last Padawan #1-5; Kanan #6-12	Greg Weisman	Pepe Laraz, Jacopo Camagni, Andrea Broccardo	272	Aug 26, 2025	Kanan - The Last Padawan #1 cover: 978-1302959470

=== Thor ===
After 2004's Avengers Disassembled event, the Thor comic was cancelled. J. Michael Straczynski and Olivier Coipel relaunched the series three years later by bringing the kingdom of Asgard to the skies above Oklahoma. The first issue of the new series debuted at #1.

Title lettering: Blue
#	Subtitle	Years covered	Issues collected	Legacy	Writers	Artists	Pages	Released	ISBN
Jump to: Thor Epic Collection
1	Reborn from Ragnarok	2006-2009	Thor (vol. 3) #1-12, Thor #600, Fantastic Four #536-537; material from Dark Reign: The Cabal One-Shot	#588-600	J. Michael Straczynski, Stan Lee, Peter Milligan	Mike McKone, Olivier Coipel, Marko Djurdjevic, David Aja, Tonci Zonjic	448	Jul 9, 2024	Thor (vol. 3) #6 cover: 978-1302956837
2	The Siege of Asgard	2009-2010	Thor #601-614, Annual (2009); Thor: Giant-Size Finale; New Mutants (vol. 3) #11	#601-614	J. Michael Straczynski, Peter Milligan, Kieron Gillen	Marko Djurdjevic, Mico Suayan, Tom Grindberg, Stefano Gaudiano, Billy Tan, Jamie McKelvie, Richard Elson, Doug Braithwaite, Niko Henrichon	456	Dec 31, 2024	Thor #604 cover: 978-1302959845
3	The World Eaters	2010-2011	Thor #615-621, 620.1; The Mighty Thor (vol. 2) #1-6; FCBD 2010: Iron Man/Thor	#615-627	Matt Fraction, Dan Abnett	Andy Lanning, John Romita Jr., Mark Brooks, Pasqual Ferry, Olivier Coipel, Salvador Larroca, Khoi Pham	408	Aug 19, 2025	The Mighty Thor (vol. 2) #1 cover: 978-1302965617
4	Fear Itself	2011-2012	The Mighty Thor (vol. 2) #7-12; Fear Itself #1-7; Fear Itself #7.2: Thor	#628-633	Matt Fraction	Pasqual Ferry, Pepe Larraz, Giuseppe Camuncoli, Stuart Immonen, Adam Kubert	392	Nov 24, 2026	The Mighty Thor (vol. 2) #11 cover: 978-1302969684

=== Venom ===
Nineteen years after Venom's debut in Amazing Spider-Man, the character received an own ongoing series, written by Daniel Way. The full 18-issue run is collected in the first volume, Shiver. By volume four, Agent Venom, Flash Thompson had replaced Eddie Brock as the main protagonist.

Title lettering: Grey
#	Subtitle	Years covered	Issues collected	Legacy	Writers	Artists	Pages	Released	ISBN
Jump to: Venom Epic Collection
1	Shiver	2003-2004	Venom #1-18	#61-78	Daniel Way	Francisco Herrera, Lan Medina, Skottie Young, Sean Galloway	424	Sep 17, 2024	Venom #10 cover: 978-1302959869
2	Sting of the Scorpion	2004-2008	Venom Vs. Carnage #1-4; Marvel Knights: Spider-Man #7-8, 11; Sensational Spider-Man (vol. 2) #38-39; Thunderbolts: Reason In Madness; Venom: Dark Origin #1-5	#79-83	Mark Millar, Peter Milligan, Roberto Aguirre-Sacasa, Zeb Wells	Terry Dodson, Clayton Crain, Lee Weeks, Angel Medina	400	Jul 28, 2026	Marvel Knights Spider-Man #8 cover: 978-1302968892
4	Agent Venom	2011-2012	Amazing Spider-Man #654, #654.1; Venom (vol. 2) #1-16, #13.1-13.4	#84-103	Dan Slott, Rick Remender, Rob Williams, Jeff Parker	Humberto Ramos, Tony Moore, Tom Fowler, Stefano Caselli, Lan Medina, Lee Garbett, Sana Takeda, Julian Totino Tedesco, Kev Walker	496	Aug 29, 2023	Venom (vol. 2) #9 cover: 978-1302952624
5	The Savage Six	2012-2013	Venom (vol. 2) #17-35, #27.1; Minimum Carnage: Alpha #1; Minimum Carnage: Omega #1; Scarlet Spider (vol. 2) #10-11	#104-123	Rick Remender, Cullen Bunn, Christopher Yost	Kev Walker, Lan Medina, Declan Shalvey, Thony Silas, Khoi Pham, Reilly Brown, Marco Checchetto	520	Dec 19, 2023	Venom (vol. 2) #25 cover: 978-1302952679
6	Space Knight	2013-2016	Venom (vol. 2) #36-42; Venom: Space-Knight #1-13	#124-143	Cullen Bunn, Robbie Thompson	Pepe Larraz, Kim Jacinto, Iban Coello, Ariel Olivetti, Gerardo Sandoval	440	Aug 13, 2024	Venom: Space-Knight #1 cover: 978-1302959852

=== Young Avengers ===
The first Modern Era volume of Young Avengers contains the complete 2005 series, written by Allan Heinberg, with art from Jim Cheung. There was a run of limited series before volume two relaunched in 2013.

Title lettering: Turquoise
#	Subtitle	Years covered	Issues collected	Writers	Artists	Pages	Released	ISBN
1	Not What You Think	2005-2006	Young Avengers (vol. 1) #1-12, Director's Cut; Young Avengers Special (2005)	Allan Heinberg	Jim Cheung, Andrea Di Vito, Michael Gaydos, Neal Adams, Gene Ha, Jae Lee, Bill Sienkiewicz, Pasqual Ferry	424	Feb 11, 2025	Young Avengers Special cover: 978-1302961916
2	Dark Reign	2006-2010	Civil War: Young Avengers & Runaways #1-4; Young Avengers Presents #1-6; Secret Invasion: Runaways/Young Avengers #1-3; Dark Reign: Young Avengers #1-5; Siege: Young Avengers	Zeb Wells, Ed Brubaker, Chris Yost, Paul Cornell, Sean McKeever	Stefano Caselli, Paco Medina, Takeshi Miyazawa, Mark Brooks, Mahmud Asrar	456	Aug 12, 2025	Young Avengers Presents #1-3, 6 combined cover: 978-1302961909
3	The Children's Crusade	2010-2011	Avengers: The Children's Crusade #1-9; Avengers: The Children's Crusade - Young Avengers; Avengers World (2014) #15-16; And Material From Uncanny X-Men (1981) #526 And; I Am An Avenger (2010) #1 And #4-5	Allan Heinberg	Jim Cheung, Olivier Coipel, Alan Davis	328	Feb 17, 2026	Avengers: The Children's Crusade #1 cover: 978-1302961923
4	Style > Substance	2012-2014	Young Avengers (vol. 2) #1-15; and material from Marvel Now! Point One #1	Kieron Gillen	Mike Norton, Jamie McKelvie	408	Apr 13, 2027	Young Avengers #13 cover: 978-1302970956

== Ultimate Epic Collections ==
On 10 October 2024, Marvel announced - via the Epic Marvel Podcast - that the Ultimate Epic Collection would be separate from the main Epic Collection, with its own trade dress.

While most Epic Collection releases take place in Marvel's main Earth-616 universe, the Ultimate series is designated as Earth-1610, with its own continuity.

The first book released was Ultimate Spider-Man Vol. 1: Learning Curve in March 2025, with a different Ultimate book released in April, May and June. The launch marked 25 years since the inception of Ultimate Marvel.

As well as the four lines below, the first three volumes of Miles Morales: Spider-Man also takes place in the Earth-1610 continuity.

=== Ultimate Fantastic Four ===
After Ultimate Spider-Man, X-Men, and Ultimates, Ultimate Fantastic Four was the final core book to launch in Marvel's new universe. Writers Mark Millar and Brian Michael Bendis worked together with artist Adam Kubert for the first six-issue arc, before Warren Ellis took on the series.

Compared to the main universe counterparts, the new series saw: "The more "superheroic" elements of the series done away with, as the Ultimate Fantastic Four book focused more on science fiction and exploration. Doctor Doom was given a less cartoony characterization than his more well-known mainstream counterpart. Other villains such as Mole Man, Annihilus and even Galactus also received massive makeovers."

The series ran for 60 issues.

Spine color: Blue
#	Subtitle	Years covered	Issues collected	Writers	Artists	Pages	Released	ISBN
1	The Fantastic	2004-2005	Ultimate Fantastic Four #1-18	Mark Millar, Brian Michael Bendis, Warren Ellis	Adam Kubert, Stuart Immonen	464	Jun 17, 2025	Ultimate Fantastic Four #1 cover: 978-1302963859
2	Frightful	2005-2006	Ultimate Fantastic Four #19-32, Annual #1	Mark Millar, Mike Carey	Greg Land, Jae Lee	400	Jun 30, 2026	Ultimate Fantastic Four #32 cover: 978-1302967994
3	God War	2006-2007	Ultimate Fantastic Four #33-46, and Annual #2; Ultimate X-Men/Fantastic Four #1; Ultimate Fantastic Four/X-Men #1	Mike Carey	Pasqual Ferry, Scott Kolins, Mark Brooks, Stuart Immonen, Frazer Irving	440	Jun 29, 2027	Ultimate Fantastic Four #42 cover: 978-1302971908

=== Ultimate Spider-Man ===
The first book in Marvel's Ultimate Universe was Ultimate Spider-Man. The title ran from 2000 until 2012, with a younger version of Peter Parker as the main protagonist. The new iteration was a response to "so much backstory that the stories (in the main books) were almost incomprehensible."

Bill Jemas, President of Marvel Enterprises from 2000 to 2004, wrote: "Joe Quesada and I started the Ultimate books because we wanted Marvel to get back in touch with kids. We wanted Marvel's great teen heroes - Spidey and the X-Men - to star in comics for 2001 kids."

Creator Brian Michael Bendis said: "When I got hired, I literally thought I was going to be writing one of the last — if not the last — Marvel comics."

The title went on to run for more than 150 issues and launched the character of Miles Morales.

- See also: Ultimate Spider-Man collected editions

Spine color: Red
#	Subtitle	Years covered	Issues collected	Writers	Artists	Pages	Released	ISBN
1	Learning Curve	2000-2001	Ultimate Spider-Man #1-13	Brian Michael Bendis	Mark Bagley	352	Mar 18, 2025	Ultimate Spider-Man #104 variant cover: 978-1302963002
2	Hunted	2001-2002	Ultimate Spider-Man #14-27	Brian Michael Bendis	Mark Bagley	344	Mar 17, 2026	978-1302967949
3	Venom	2002-2003	Ultimate Spider-Man #28-39, 1/2	Brian Michael Bendis	Mark Bagley	296	Mar 16, 2027	Ultimate Spider-Man #36 cover: 978-1302970918

=== Ultimate X-Men ===
Launched by writer Mark Millar, Ultimate X-Men saw "the superheroic side of the franchise pushed a bit to the sidelines. Instead, the prejudice mutants faced on a daily basis took center stage."

Millar was followed by superstar writers Brian Michael Bendis, Brian K Vaughan, and Robert Kirkman, and "the Ultimate X-Men comics quickly became the most popular titles at Marvel Comics, even outselling X-Men books in the mainstream continuity."

The series ran for 100 issues.

Spine color: Orange
#	Subtitle	Years covered	Issues collected	Writers	Artists	Pages	Released	ISBN
1	The Tomorrow People	2001-2002	Ultimate X-Men #1-12, ½	Mark Millar, Geoff Johns	Adam Kubert, Tom Raney	336	Apr 22, 2025	Ultimate X-Men #1 cover: 978-1302963019
2	World Tour	2002-2003	Ultimate X-Men #13-25	Chuck Austen, Mark Millar	Esad Ribic, Adam Kubert, Chris Bachalo, Kaare Andrews	336	Apr 21, 2026	Ultimate X-Men: Ultimate Collection Vol. 2 cover: 978-1302967963
3	Return of the King	2002-2003	Ultimate War #1-4; Ultimate X-Men #26-33	Mark Millar	Chris Bachalo, David Finch, Adam Kubert	304	Apr 20, 2027	978-1302970963

=== Ultimates ===
The Ultimates portrayed a version of The Avengers, outside of the main Marvel continuity that "looked and sounded like a movie in a way that no Marvel story ever had."

Written by Mark Millar, and drawn by Bryan Hitch, the comic blurred the lines of right and wrong, where the heroes "have no idea they are supervillains. They think they're merely doing what superheroes are supposed to do: defend truth, justice, and the American Way — with an emphasis on the latter." Millar conceded that point, describing the series as a "pro-status quo book" and "kind of a right-wing book, like Rush Limbaugh doing super comics".

Director of Marvel Studio's 2012 The Avengers movie, Joss Whedon, said: "It's my feeling that Ultimates brought Marvel into the modern age in a way no other book did."

Spine color: Silver
#	Subtitle	Years covered	Issues collected	Writers	Artists	Pages	Released	ISBN
1	Super-Human	2002-2004	Ultimates #1-13	Mark Millar	Bryan Hitch	376	May 20, 2025	Ultimates #13 cover: 978-1302963033
2	Gods and Monsters	2005-2006	Ultimates 2 #1-13, Annual #1	Mark Millar	Bryan Hitch	488	Sep 1, 2026	Ultimates 2: Ultimate Collection cover: 978-1302969370

== Cancelled ==
Book	Issues collected	Pages	Original date	ISBN
King Conan Chronicles Vol. 2: Wolves and Dragons	King Conan: The Hour of the Dragon (2013) #1-6, King Conan: The Conqueror (2014) #1-6, Conan: Wolves Beyond the Border (2015) #1-4; material from Robert E. Howard's Savage Sword #5	416	Oct 2022	978-1302948184
Master of Kung Fu Vol. 3: Traitors to the Crown	Master of Kung Fu #54–79	480	Jan 13, 2023	978-1302901370

== Statistics ==
=== Longest books ===
Line	Title	Released	Pages
Modern Era Epic	Dark Avengers Vol. 1: Osborn's Reign	Jan 30, 2024	552
Epic	Star Wars: The Original Marvel Years Vol. 6	May 9, 2023	544
Epic	Star Wars: The Original Marvel Years: Droids & Ewoks	Nov 12, 2024	536
Epic	Avengers Vol. 11: The Evil Reborn	May 21, 2024	528
Epic	Avengers Vol. 12: Court-Martial	May 6, 2025	528
Epic	Avengers Vol. 27: Timeslide	Dec 16, 2025	528
Epic	Daredevil Vol. 6: Watch Out for Bullseye	Mar 28, 2023	528
Epic	Daredevil Vol. 7: The Concrete Jungle	Apr 2, 2024	528
Epic	Daredevil Vol. 17: Into the Fire	Aug 8, 2023	528
Epic	Incredible Hulk Vol. 8: The Curing of Dr. Banner	Oct 24, 2023	528
Epic	Iron Fist Vol. 1: The Fury of Iron Fist	Jul 8, 2015	528
Epic	Thor Vol. 25: The Dark Gods	Jul 29, 2025	528
Epic	X-Men Vol. 5: Second Genesis	Mar 29, 2017	528

=== Shortest books ===
Line	Title	Released	Pages
Epic	Planet of the Apes: The Original Marvel Years Vol. 1	May 24, 2024	224
Modern Era Epic	Young Avengers Vol.3: The Children's Crusade	Feb 17, 2026	248
Modern Era Epic	Annihilation Vol.3: Conquest Prelude	Jun 9, 2026	272
Modern Era Epic	Star Wars: Kanan - The Last Padawan	Aug 26, 2025	272
Epic	Conan: The Original Marvel Years Vol. 2: Hawks from the Sea	Mar 23, 2021	288
Epic	Ms. Marvel Vol. 1: This Woman, This Warrior	Jan 9, 2019	312
Epic	Silver Surfer Vol. 1: When Calls Galactus	Nov 19, 2014	320
Modern Era Epic	Astonishing X-Men Vol. 1: Gifted	Mar 26, 2024	320
Epic	Conan: The Original Marvel Years Vol. 6: Vengeance In Asgalun	Sep 22, 2022	328
Epic	Conan: The Original Marvel Years Vol. 3: The Curse of the Golden Skull	Aug 10, 2021	336
Ultimate Epic	Ultimate X-Men Vol. 1: The Tomorrow People	Apr 15, 2025	336
Ultimate Epic	Ultimate X-Men Vol. 2: World Tour	Apr 21, 2026	336
Modern Era Epic	New X-Men Vol. 3: Planet X	Jun 2, 2026	336

=== Oldest books ===
Statistics for debut chart position and first-month sales come from ICv2. Estimates are for North American stores only, with UK purchases adding between three and 20 per cent to sales numbers.

Title	Released	Price (USD)	Pages	Chart Pos	Sales
Iron Man Vol. 10: The Enemy Within	Sep 18, 2013	$39.99	504	129	864
Thor Vol. 16: War of the Pantheons	Oct 23, 2013	$34.99	472	127	986
Amazing Spider-Man Vol. 20: Cosmic Adventures	Nov 20, 2013	$39.99	504	103	1,010
Avengers Vol. 9: The Final Threat	Dec 11, 2013	$39.99	440	135	943
Fantastic Four Vol. 17: All in the Family	Jan 15, 2014	$34.99	496	136	757
Captain America Vol. 9: Dawn's Early Light	Feb 19, 2014	$34.99	496	122	866
Iron Man Vol. 16: War Games	Mar 19, 2014	$39.99	504	160	867
Daredevil Vol. 18: Fall from Grace	Apr 9, 2014	$44.99	456	157	830
Thor Vol. 11: A Kingdom Lost	Apr 16, 2014	$34.99	480	156	838
Amazing Spider-Man Vol. 15: Ghosts of the Past	May 21, 2014	$34.99	472	81	1,152
Avengers Vol. 17: Judgment Day	Jun 18, 2014	$34.99	464	110	969
Fantastic Four Vol. 20: Into the Time Stream	Jul 23, 2014	$39.99	504	171	818
Captain America Vol. 12: Society of Serpents	Aug 20, 2014	$34.99	432	103	944
Fantastic Four Vol. 1: The World's Greatest Comic Magazine	Sep 10, 2014	$34.99	456	85	1,233
Amazing Spider-Man Vol. 1: Great Power	Sep 24, 2014	$34.99	504	54	1,680
Moon Knight Vol. 1: Bad Moon Rising	Oct 1, 2014	$39.99	504	73	1,688
Thor Vol. 1: The God of Thunder	Oct 15, 2014	$34.99	480	98	1,379
Iron Man Vol. 1: The Golden Avenger	Oct 29, 2014	$34.99	520	118	1,193
Avengers Vol. 1: Earth's Mightiest Heroes	Nov 12, 2014	$34.99	456	77	1,381
Silver Surfer Vol. 1: When Calls Galactus	Nov 19, 2014	$34.99	320	58	1,664
Captain America Vol. 1: Captain America Lives Again	Nov 26, 2014	$34.99	488	85	1,256
Wolverine Vol. 1: Madripoor Nights	Dec 10, 2014	$34.99	504	54	1,486
X-Men Vol. 1: Children of the Atom	Dec 24, 2014	$34.99	520	56	1,444
Iron Man Vol. 13: Stark Wars	Jan 21, 2015	$39.99	496	89	1,090
Thor Vol. 4: To Wake The Mangog	Feb 25, 2015	$34.99	456	101	1,007
Amazing Spider-Man Vol. 22: Round Robin	Mar 31, 2015	$34.99	488	97	1,094
Star Wars Legends: The Empire Vol. 1	Apr 8, 2015	$34.99	440	40	2,340
Avengers Vol. 4: Behold... The Vision	Apr 29, 2015	$34.99	456	100	1,401
Star Wars Legends: The New Republic Vol. 1	May 13, 2015	$34.99	488	39	2,081
Fantastic Four Vol. 25: Strange Days	May 27, 2015	$34.99	472	147	876
Captain America Vol. 16: Streets of Poison	Jun 17, 2015	$34.99	512	129	1,044
Ant Man/Giant-Man Vol. 1: The Man in the Ant Hill	Jun 24, 2015	$34.99	448	100	1,318
Star Wars Legends: The Old Republic Vol. 1	Jul 1, 2015	$34.99	440	54	1,840
Iron Fist Vol. 1: The Fury of the Iron Fist	Jul 8, 2015	$39.99	528	62	1,720
Power Man & Iron Fist Vol. 1: Heroes for Hire	Aug 5, 2015	$39.99	448	51	1,809
Daredevil Vol. 21: Widow's Kiss	Aug 19, 2015	$34.99	504	93	1,320
Star Wars Legends: Rise of the Sith Vol. 1	Aug 26, 2015	$34.99	488	42	1,972

=== Releases per year ===
Statistics are correct up to and including the scheduled release of Captain America Epic #24: American Nightmare on 30 December 2025.

Year	Epics	Reprints	Moderns	Ultimates	Total
2013	4				4
2014	19				19
2015	20				20
2016	22				22
2017	32				32
2018	34	1			35
2019	41	4			45
2020	33	4			37
2021	37	18			55
2022	47	24			71
2023	50	22	8		80
2024	45	20	24		89
2025	40	6	27	4	77
Total	424	99	59	4	586

== Recent and upcoming releases ==
Series	Title	Out	ISBN
November 2026
Generation X Epic #6	Counter X	Nov 3, 2026	978-1302969738
Captain America Epic #8	The Lazarus Conspiracy	Nov 3, 2026	978-1302967901
Hulk Modern Epic #8	Fall Of The Hulks	Nov 10, 2026	978-1302970130
X-Factor Epic #2	The Morlock Massacre	Nov 17, 2026	978-1302969530
Star Wars: Darth Vader Modern Epic #3	The Chosen One	Nov 24, 2026	978-1302969851
Thor Modern Epic #4	Fear Itself	Nov 24, 2026	978-1302969684
December 2026
All-New Wolverine Modern Epic #2	Orphans Of X	Dec 1, 2026	978-1302969721
Daredevil Epic #9	Resurrection	Dec 1, 2026	978-1302967925
Ghost Rider: Danny Ketch Epic #2	Bad To The Bone	Dec 1, 2026	978-1302969486
Guardians Of The Galaxy Modern Epic #3	Annihilators	Dec 8, 2026	978-1302969868
Amazing Spider-Man Epic #29	The Mark Of Kaine	Dec 8, 2026	978-1302970055
She-Hulk Epic #5	Interrupted Melody	Dec 22, 2026	978-1302969516
Avengers: West Coast Epic #8	Terminated	Dec 29, 2026	978-1302969455
X-Force Epic #5	Starting Over	Dec 29, 2026	978-1302969783
January 2027
Namor the Sub-Mariner Epic #2	Destiny or Death	Jan 5, 2027	978-1302967468
Silver Surfer Epic #11	Temptation	Jan 12, 2027	978-1302969769
Deadpool Epic #6	Funeral for a Freak	Jan 12, 2027	978-1302969462
X-Men Epic #15	Fall of the Mutants	Jan 19, 2027	978-1302969790
Incredible Hulk Epic #16	Joe Fixit	Jan 26, 2027	978-1302969493
Amazing Spider-Man Modern Era Epic #4	The Other	Jan 26, 2027	978-1302967130
February 2027
Amazing Spider-Man Modern Era Epic #16	Ends of the Earth	Feb 2, 2027	978-1302970871
Amazing Spider-Man Epic #30	Maximum Clonage	Feb 9, 2027	978-1302971847
Star Wars Modern Era Epic #4	Mutiny at Mon Cala	Feb 16, 2027	978-1302972158
Hulk Modern Era Epic #9	World War Hulks	Feb 16, 2027	9781302972455
Daredevil Modern Era Epic #1	Guardian Devil	Feb 23, 2027	978-1302972141
Incredible Hulk Epic #12	Unholy Alliance	Feb 23, 2027	978-1302971151
March 2027
Punisher Epic #1	The Punisher Strikes	Mar 2, 2027	978-1302972493
Daredevil Epic #10	Redemption	Mar 9, 2027	978-1302971168
Iron Man Epic #12	Iron Monger	Mar 9, 2027	978-1302972486
Ultimate Spider-Man Ultimate Epic #3	Venom	Mar 16, 2027	978-1302970918
Thunderbolts Epic #5	Criminal Intent	Mar 23, 2027	978-1302971892
Avengers Epic #28	Heroes Reborn	Mar 30, 2027	978-1302972127
April 2027
Deadpool Modern Era Epic #3	Evil Deadpool	Apr 6, 2027	978-1302970925
Young Avengers Modern Era Epic #4	Style > Substance	Apr 13, 2027	978-1302970956
Ultimate X-Men Ultimate Epic #3	Return of the King	Apr 20, 2027	978-1302970963
Miles Morales: Spider-Man Modern Era Epic #5	Sinister Six Reborn	Apr 27, 2027	978-1302972080
May 2027
Fantastic Four Epic #14	Into the Negative Zone	May 4, 2027	978-1302971175
Ghost Rider: Danny Ketch Epic #3	Rise of the Midnight Sons	May 4, 2027	978-1302971861
New Avengers Modern Era Epic #5	Dark Reign	May 11, 2027	978-1302970994
Star Wars: Darth Vader Modern Epic #4	Fortress Vader	May 18, 2027	978-1302972165
Aliens Epic #5	The Original Years	May 25, 2027	978-1302971830
June 2027
Wolverine Epic #4	Escape from Weapon X	Jun 1, 2027	978-1302971915
Marvel Two-In-One Epic #5	Monster Man	Jun 8, 2027	978-1302971182
Captain America Epic #25	Twisted Tomorrows	Jun 15, 2027	978-1302972134
Annihilation Modern Era Epic #4	Conquest	Jun 22, 2027	978-1302971854
Ultimate Fantastic Four Ultimate Epic #3	God War	Jun 29, 2027	978-1302971908

== See also ==
- Marvel Premier Collection
- Marvel Omnibus
- Marvel oversized hardcovers
- Marvel Gallery Editions
- Marvel Complete Collections
- Marvel Masterworks
- Essential Marvel
- Daredevil collected editions
- Spider-Man collected editions
- DC Finest trade paperbacks
- DC Compact Comics
