= List of Star Wars comic books =

This is a list of Star Wars comic books set in the fictional Star Wars universe. Star Wars comic books were originally published by Marvel Comics, starting with the original series in 1977 and ending in 1984. Blackthorne Publishing published a run of 3-D comics from 1987 to 1988, and Dark Horse Comics published Star Wars comic books from 1991 until 2014. Exclusive publishing rights returned to Marvel Comics in 2015. Almost all Star Wars comics published prior to 2015 have been rebranded as non-canon with the designation Legends.

BBY stands for years before the Battle of Yavin, an in-universe event which occurred during the original Star Wars film. (Note: Later titled Star Wars: Episode IV – A New Hope) ABY stands for years after the Battle of Yavin.

== Film and television adaptations ==
All pre-2014 film and television adaptations are in the Legends continuity, even though they adapt Canon films.

=== Film adaptations ===
Title	Publishing Date	Timeline	Author
Marvel (Legends)
Star Wars #1–6 (A New Hope) (Note: Also included in Classic Star Wars: A Long Time Ago... Volume 1: Doomworld by Archie Goodwin (which collects Marvel Star Wars #1–20))	1977	0 BBY–0 ABY	Roy Thomas
Star Wars #39–44 (The Empire Strikes Back) (Note: Also included in Classic Star Wars: A Long Time Ago... Volume 3: Resurrection of Evil (which collects Marvel's Star Wars #39–53))	1980	3 ABY	Archie Goodwin
Return of the Jedi #1–4	1983	4 ABY	Archie Goodwin
Dark Horse Comics (Legends)
Star Wars: A New Hope — The Special Edition #1–4	1997	0 BBY–0 ABY	Bruce Jones
Episode I: The Phantom Menace #1–4	1999	32 BBY	Henry Gilroy
Episode II: Attack of the Clones #1–4	2002	22 BBY	Henry Gilroy
Episode III: Revenge of the Sith #1–4	2005	19 BBY	Miles Lane
Marvel (Canon)
Solo: A Star Wars Story #1–7	October 2018–April 2019	13-10 BBY	Robbie Thompson
Rogue One: A Star Wars Story #1–6	April–September 2017	0 BBY	Jody Houser
Star Wars: The Force Awakens #1–6	June–November 2016	34 ABY	Chuck Wendig
Star Wars: The Last Jedi #1–6	May–September 2018	34 ABY	Gary Whitta
Star Wars: The Rise of Skywalker #1–5	February–June 2025	35 ABY	Jody Houser
Disney Lucasfilm Press
Star Wars: The Original Trilogy – A Graphic Novel	March 2016	0 BBY–4 ABY	Alessandro Ferrari
Star Wars: The Prequel Trilogy – A Graphic Novel	April 2017	32 BBY–19 BBY	Alessandro Ferrari
IDW Publishing
Star Wars: The Phantom Menace Graphic Novel Adaptation	July 2021	32 BBY	Alessandro Ferrari
Star Wars: Attack of the Clones Graphic Novel Adaptation	December 14 2021	22 BBY	Alessandro Ferrari
Solo: A Star Wars Story Graphic Novel Adaptation	March 2019	13 BBY–10 BBY	Alessandro Ferrari
Rogue One: A Star Wars Story Graphic Novel Adaptation	December 2017	0 BBY	Alessandro Ferrari
Star Wars: A New Hope Graphic Novel Adaptation	September 2018	0 BBY	Alessandro Ferrari
Star Wars: The Empire Strikes Back Graphic Novel Adaptation	March 2019	3 ABY	Alessandro Ferrari
Star Wars: Return of the Jedi Graphic Novel Adaptation	October 2019	4 ABY	Alessandro Ferrari
Star Wars: The Force Awakens Graphic Novel Adaptation	August 2017	34 ABY	Alessandro Ferrari
Star Wars: The Last Jedi Graphic Novel Adaptation	September 2018	34 ABY	Alessandro Ferrari
Star Wars: The Rise of Skywalker Graphic Novel Adaptation	March 2021	35 ABY	Alessandro Ferrari
Joe Books Ltd
Star Wars: A New Hope Cinestory Comic	October 2017	0 BBY–0 ABY	
Random House
Star Wars: The Empire Strikes Back Screen Comix	October 2020	3 ABY	
Star Wars: The Rise of Skywalker Screen Comix	October 2020	35 ABY	

=== Television adaptations ===
Title	Publishing Date	Timeline	Episodes Adapted
Marvel (Canon)
The Mandalorian #1–8	July 2022–March 2023	9 ABY	Season 1, Episodes 1–8
The Mandalorian Season 2 #1–8	June 2023–January 2024	9 ABY	Season 2, Episodes 1–8
Obi-Wan Kenobi #1–6	September 2023–March 2024	9 BBY	Season 1, Episodes 1–6
Ahsoka #1–8	July 2024–February 2025	9 ABY	Season 1, Episodes 1–8
Joe Books Ltd
Star Wars Rebels: Spark of Rebellion Cinestory Comic	August 2017	5 BBY	Season 1, Episodes 1–6
Star Wars Rebels: Path of the Jedi Cinestory Comic	November 2017	4 BBY	Season 1, Episodes 8–10, 12–13
Maul: A Star Wars Rebels Cinestory Comic	February 2018	3 BBY–2 BBY	Season 2, Episodes 21–22; Season 3, Episodes 3, 11 and 20
Random House
The Clone Wars: Season 7: Volume 1	December 2020	19 BBY	Season 7, Episodes 1–6
The Mandalorian: Season 1: Volume 1	March 2021	9 ABY	Season 1, Episodes 1–4
The Mandalorian: The Rescue	May 2022	9 ABY	Season 2, Episodes 8

== Canon original stories ==
=== The High Republic ===
Title	Publishing Date	Issue / Arc	Timeline	Author(s)
The High Republic — The Blade	December 2022–March 2023		382 BBY	Charles Soule
The High Republic (2022) #1–10	October 2022–May 2023)	#1–5 Balance of the Force; #6–10 Battle for the Force	382 BBY	Cavan Scott
The High Republic (2021) #1–15	January 2021–March 2022	#1–5 There is No Fear; #6–8 Heart of the Drengir; #9–10 The Shadow of the Nihil; #10–15 Jedi's End	c. 232-230 BBY	Cavan Scott
The High Republic Adventures #1–13	February 2021–February 2022	#1 Collision Course; #2 Bralanak City Smackdown; #3 Starlight; #4 The Mountain; #5 Showdown on the Junk Moon; Special: Attack on the Republic Fair; #6-7 Mission to Bilbousa; #8-10 Back Together and Away Again; Special: Galactic Bake-Off Spectacular; #11 The Great Jedi Rumble Race; Annual 2021; #12 Let Go; #13 For Light and Life	c. 232-230 BBY	Daniel José Older
The High Republic Adventures: The Monster of Temple Peak #1–4	August–November 2021		c. 232 BBY	Cavan Scott
The High Republic: Trail of Shadows #1–5	October 2021–February 2022	#1 Trail of Shadows; #2 Way Down Deep in the Dark; #3 Cold Comfort; #4 Whatever It Takes; #5 Dust	231 BBY	Daniel José Older
The High Republic: Eye of the Storm #1–2	January–March 2022	#1 Ro: The Truth. The Lie. The Kill.; #2 Marchion: The Wreckage. The Hunt. The Storm.	252–230 BBY	Charles Soule
The High Republic: Shadows of Starlight #1–4	October 2023–January 2024		229 BBY	Charles Soule
The High Republic (2023) #1–10	November 2023–August 2024	1–5 Children of the Storm; 6–10 The Hunted	229 BBY	Cavan Scott
The High Republic: Fear Of The Jedi #1–5	February 2025–June 2025		228 BBY	Cavan Scott

=== Fall of the Jedi ===
Title	Publishing Date	Issue / Arc	Timeline	Author(s)
Mace Windu #1–4	February 2024–May 2024	#1 Mace Windu; #2 Underground; #3 The Run; #4 Showdown	Before 42 BBY	Marc Bernardin
Jedi Fallen Order: Dark Temple #1–5	September–December 2019	#1 A Planet Divided; #2 Trapped in Ontotho; #3 A Fragile Peace; #4 A Truce, a Trap and a Traitor; #5 The Collapse of All Things	41 BBY	Matthew Rosenberg
Darth Maul – Black, White & Red #1–4	April 2024–July 2024	#1 Ghost Ship; #2 The Remainders; #3 The Mission; #4 Peace and Quiet	Between 40 BBY and 32 BBY	Benjamin Percy
Jango Fett #1–4	March 2024–June 2024	#1–4 Trail of Lost Hope	33 BBY	Ethan Sacks
Darth Maul #1–5	February–July 2017	Probe Droid Problem by Chris Eliopoulos and Jordie Bellaire (mini-comic published in issue #1, reprinted in Droids Unplugged #1)	c. 32 BBY	Cullen Bunn
Star Wars: Jedi Knights #1–	March 2025-		Up to 32 BBY	Marc Guggenheim
Episode I: The Phantom Menace
Obi-Wan & Anakin #1–5	January–May 2016		29 BBY	Charles Soule
Episode II: Attack of the Clones
Jedi of the Republic – Mace Windu #1–5	August–December 2017		c. 22 BBY	Matt Owens
The Clone Wars (film)
The Clone Wars (TV series)
Darth Maul – Son of Dathomir #1–4: Originally published by Dark Horse Comics.; Reprinted in 2017 by Marvel Comics.	May–August 2014	#1 The Enemy of My Enemy; #2 A Tale of Two Apprentices; #3 Proxy War; #4 Showdown on Dathomir	19 BBY	Jeremy Barlow
Episode III: Revenge of the Sith

=== Reign of the Empire ===
Title	Publishing Date	Issue / Arc	Timeline	Author(s)
The Bad Batch
Darth Vader: Dark Lord of the Sith #1–25, 1 annual	June 2017–December 2018	#1–6 The Chosen One; No Good Deed... by Chris Eliopoulos and Jordie Bellaire (mini-comic published in Issue #1); #7–10 The Dying Light; #11–12 The Rule of Five; #13–17 Burning Seas; #18 Bad Ground; Annual #2: Technological Terror; #19–25 Fortress Vader	19 BBY–12 BBY	Charles Soule Chuck Wendig (Annual #2)
Inquisitors #1–4	July 2024–October 2024		Between 14 BBY–9 BBY	Rodney Barnes
Thrawn #1–6: Adaptation of the novel	February–July 2018		13 BBY–2 BBY	Jody Houser
Beckett one-shot	August 2018	#1 The Man in Black; #2 To Live and Die on Hovun IV; #3 You and the Bantha you Rode In on	11 BBY–10 BBY	Gerry Duggan
Lando: Double or Nothing #1–5	May–September 2018		10 BBY	Rodney Barnes
Solo: A Star Wars Story
Han Solo: Imperial Cadet #1–5	November 2018–March 2019		13 BBY–10 BBY	Robbie Thompson
Obi-Wan Kenobi
Andor
Star Wars Rebels
Kanan #1–12	April 2015–March 2016	#1–6 The Last Padawan; #1 Part I: Fight (flashback to 19 BBY); #2 Part II: Flight (flashback to 19 BBY); #3 Part III: Pivot (flashback to 19 BBY); #4 Part IV: Catch (flashback to 18 BBY); #5 Part V: Release (flashback to 18 BBY); #6 Epilogue: Haunt; #7–12 First Blood; #7 Part I: The Corridors of Coruscant (flashback to 19 BBY); #8 Part II: The Towers of the Temple (flashback to 19 BBY); #9 Part III: The Canyons of Kardoa (flashback to 19 BBY); #10 Part IV: The Mesas of Mygeeto (flashback to 19 BBY); #11 Part V: The Fog of War (flashback to 19 BBY); #12 Part VI: The Ties That Bind	4 BBY During events of Star Wars Andor Star Wars Rebels Season 1.	Greg Weisman
Rogue One – Cassian & K-2SO Special one-shot	August 2017		2 BBY–0 BBY	Duane Swierczynski
Vader: Dark Visions #1–5	March–June 2019	#1 Dark Visions; #2 Unacceptable; #3 Tall, Dark and Handsome; #4 Hotshot; #5 You Can Run...	2 BBY–0 BBY	Dennis Hallum
Han Solo & Chewbacca #1–10	March 2022–March 2023	#1–5 The Crystal Run; # 6-10: Dead or Alive	Between 8 BBY–2 BBY	Marc Guggenheim
Thrawn: Alliances #1–4: Adaptation of the novel	January 2024–April 2024		2 BBY	Timothy Zahn, Jody Houser
Obi-Wan #1–5	May 2022–September 2022	#1 Youngling's Challenge; #2 A Shadow Falls on the Padawan; #3 Darkest Before the Dawn; #4 The Sun Sets and It Rises; #5 Ben	1 BBY	Christopher Cantwell
Rogue One: A Star Wars Story

=== Age of Rebellion ===
Title	Publishing Date	Issue / Arc	Timeline	Author(s)
Episode IV: A New Hope
Princess Leia #1–5	March–June 2015		0 ABY	Mark Waid
Han Solo #1–5	June–November 2016		0 ABY	Marjorie Liu
Chewbacca (2015) #1–5	October–December 2015		0 ABY	Gerry Duggan
Star Wars (2015) #1–75, 4 annuals	January 2015 – December 2019	#1–6 Skywalker Strikes; #7 From the Journals of Old Ben Kenobi: "The Last of His Breed" (flashback to 11 BBY); #8–12 Showdown on the Smuggler's Moon; Annual #1; #13 Vader Down, Part III; #14 Vader Down, Part V; #15, #20 From the Journals of Old Ben Kenobi (flashback to 10 BBY); #16–19 Rebel Jail; #21–25 The Last Flight of the Harbinger; #25 co-authored by Chris Eliopoulos; Droid Dilemma by Chris Eliopoulos and Jordie Bellaire (mini-comic published in Issue #25, reprinted in Droids Unplugged 1); Annual #2; #26–30 Yoda's Secret War (flashback to pre-32 BBY and 10 BBY); Shu-Torun Lives by Kieron Gillen (mini-comic published in Issue #30); #31 Screaming Citadel, Part II; #32 Screaming Citadel, Part IV; #33 Rebels in the Wild; #34 The Thirteen Crates; #35 The Hutt Run; #36 Revenge of the Astromech; Annual #3; #37 Imperial Pride; The Sand Will Provide by Jason Aaron and Dash Aaron (mini-comic published in Issue #37); #38–43 The Ashes of Jedha; #44–49 Mutiny at Mon Cala; Annual #4; #50–55 Hope Dies; #56–61 The Escape; #62–67 The Scourging of Shu-Torun; #68–72 Rebels and Rogues; #73–75 Rogues and Rebels	0–3 ABY Issues #1–25 parallel to Star Wars: Darth Vader. Issues #26–75 parallel to Star Wars: Doctor Aphra.	Jason Aaron (Issues #1–37) Kieron Gillen (Annual #1, Issues #38–67) Greg Pak (Issues #68–75) Kelly Thompson (Annual #2) Jason Latour (Annual #3) Cullen Bunn (Annual #4)
Darth Vader (2015) #1–25, 1 annual	February 2015–October 2016	#1–6 Vader; #7–12 Shadows and Secrets; Annual 1; #13 Vader Down, Part II; #14 Vader Down, Part IV; #15 Vader Down, Part VI; #16–19 The Shu-Torun War; #20–25 End of Games; The Misadventures of Triple-Zero and Beetee (mini-comic published in Issue #20); Coda (mini-comic published in Issue #25)	0–1 ABY Parallel to Star Wars #1–25.	Kieron Gillen
Vader Down Star Wars and Darth Vader crossover event.	November 2015	Star Wars: Vader Down; #1 Part I (one-shot); #2 Part II (Issue #13 of Darth Vader); #3 Part III (Issue #13 of Star Wars); #4 Part IV (Issue #14 of Darth Vader); #5 Part V (Issue #14 of Star Wars); #6 Part VI (Issue #15 of Darth Vader)	0 ABY	Jason Aaron and Kieron Gillen
Doctor Aphra (2016) #1–40, 3 annuals	December 2016–December 2019	#1–6 Aphra; #7 Screaming Citadel, Part III; #8 Screaming Citadel, Part V; #9–13 The Enormous Profit; Annual #1; #14–19 Remastered; #20–25 The Catastrophe Con; Annual #2; #26–31 Worst Among Equals; #32–36 Unspeakable Rebel Superweapon; Annual #3; #37–40 A Rogue's End	0–3 ABY Parallel to Star Wars #26–75.	Kieron Gillen (Issues #1–19) Simon Spurrier (Issues #14–present)
The Screaming Citadel Star Wars and Doctor Aphra crossover event.	May 2017	Star Wars: The Screaming Citadel; #1 Part I (one-shot); #2 Part II (Issue #31 of Star Wars); #3 Part III (Issue #7 of Doctor Aphra); #4 Part IV (Issue #32 of Star Wars); #5 Part V (Issue #8 of Doctor Aphra)	0–1 ABY	Jason Aaron and Kieron Gillen
The Last Jedi – Storms of Crait one-shot	December 2017		Between 0 ABY and 1 ABY	Ben Acker and Ben Blacker
Lando #1–5	July–October 2015		Between 0 ABY and 3 ABY	Charles Soule
Target Vader #1–6	July–December 2019	#1 On the Hunt; #2 The Plan; #3 The Trap; #4 The Shot; #5 The Past; #6 Free	Pre-3 ABY	Robbie Thompson
Empire Ascendant one-shot	December 2019	Darth Vader: In Service to the Empire; Doctor Aphra: Epilogue; Bounty Hunters: Two Sides to Every Sortie; Star Wars: An Echo of Victory	Pre-3 ABY	Charles Soule, Greg Pak, Ethan Sacks, and Simon Spurrier
Yoda #1–10	November 2022–August 2023	1–3 Light and Life (Flashback c. 384-382 BBY); 4–6 Students of the Force (Flashback 42 BBY); 7–9 Size Matters Not (Flashback 19 BBY); 10 The Cave	3 ABY	Cavan Scott, Jody Houser, Marc Guggenheim
Episode V: The Empire Strikes Back
Star Wars (2020) #1–50	January 2020–September 2024	#1–6 The Destiny Path; #7–12 Operation Starlight; #13 War Of The Bounty Hunters Prelude 2: The Hunt For Han Solo; #14-18 War Of The Bounty Hunters; #19-20 Dangerous Turns & Dangerous Lessons; #21 Trapped On A Star Destroyer; #22-24 The Last Division & The Dawn Alliance; #25 The Lesson (Obi-Wan & Anakin), The Lesson (Darth Vader), See You Around, Kid, A Eulogy For Snap; #26-30 The Path To Victory; #31-36 Quests Of The Force; #37-41 Dark Droids; #42-43 The Sith And The Skywalker; #44-47 The Trial Of Lando Calrissian; #48-50 The Path Of Light	3–4 ABY	Charles Soule (Issues #1–50)
Darth Vader (2020) #1–50	February 2020–September 2024	#1–5 Dark Heart Of The Sith; #6–11 Into the Fire; #12 War of the Bounty Hunters Prelude 4: Into The Trap; #13-17 War Of The Bounty Hunters; #18-24 Crimson Reign; #25-27 The Shadow's Shadow; #28-32 Return Of The Handmaidens; #33-34 Unbound Force; #35-36 Target Aphra; #37-41 Dark Droids; #42-45 Rise Of The Schism Imperial; #46-50 Phantoms	3–4 ABY	Greg Pak (Issues #1–50)
Doctor Aphra (2020) #1–40	May 2020–January 2024	#1–5 Fortune and Fate; #6–9 The Engine Job; #10 War of the Bounty Hunters Prelude 5: The Invitation; #11-15 War Of The Bounty Hunters; #16-21 Crimson Reign; #22-25 Spark Eternal; #26-31 Ascendant; #32-34 Ripple Effect; #35-40 Dark Droids	3–4 ABY	Alyssa Wong (Issues #1–40)
Bounty Hunters #1–42	May 2020–January 2024	#1–5 Galaxy's Deadliest; #6–7 Target Valance; #8–10 The Terminus Gauntlet; #11 The Great Hunt of Malastare; #12 War of the Bounty Hunters Prelude 3: Target Solo; #13-17 War of the Bounty Hunters; #18-23 Crimson Reign; #24-26 The Raid On The Vermillion; #27-28 Havoc At The Accretion Disco; #29-32 Bedlam On Bestine; #33-34 In The Crosshairs Of Inferno Squad; #35-36 Target: Fett; #37-42 Dark Droids	3–4 ABY	Ethan Sacks (Issues #1–42)
War of the Bounty Hunters; Bounty Hunters, Darth Vader, Doctor Aphra, and Star Wars crossover event.	May–November 2021	Part 1 from War of the Bounty Hunters Alpha one-shot; Parts 2, 8, 16, 20, 28, 33 from Star Wars (2020) (issues #13–18); Parts 3, 7, 11, 17, 27, 34 from Bounty Hunters (issues #12–17); Parts 4, 9, 14, 21, 25, 31 from Darth Vader (2020) (issues #12–17); Parts 5, 10, 12, 22, 24, 30 from Doctor Aphra (2020) (issues #10–15); Parts 6, 13, 19, 23, 29 from War of the Bounty Hunters miniseries (issues #1–5); Part 15 from War of the Bounty Hunters – Jabba the Hutt one-shot; Part 18 from War of the Bounty Hunters – 4-LOM & Zuckuss one-shot; Part 26 from War of the Bounty Hunters – Boushh one-shot; Part 32 from War of the Bounty Hunters – IG-88 one-shot	3–4 ABY	Charles Soule, Greg Pak, Alyssa Wong, Ethan Sacks, Justina Ireland and Daniel José Older
Crimson Reign #1–5	December 2021–June 2022	#1 The Orphans; #2 The Assassins; #3 The Archivist; #4 The Knights; #5 The Scarlet Queen	3–4 ABY	Charles Soule
The Hidden Empire #1–5	November 2022–April 2023	#1 A Matter of Time; #2 The Dawn Fleet; #3 I Am Chanath Cha; #4 Rings; #5 Amaxine	3–4 ABY	Charles Soule
Dark Droids #1–5	August 2023–December 2023		3–4 ABY	Marc Guggenheim, Charles Soule
Dark Droids: D-Squad #1–4	September 2023–December 2023		3–4 ABY	Marc Guggenheim
Sana Starros #1–5	February 2023–June 2023	#1–5 Family Matters	3–4 ABY	Justina Ireland
Return of the Jedi	March 2023–August 2023	Jabba's Palace #1; Ewoks #1; Lando #1; The Empire #1; The Rebellion #1; Max Rebo #1	4 ABY	Marc Guggenheim, Jody Houser, Daniel José Older, Stephanie Phillips, Alex Segura
Episode VI: Return of the Jedi
TIE Fighter #1–5	April–August 2019	#1–5 The Shadow Falls	3-4 ABY	Jody Houser
Shattered Empire #1–4	September–October 2015		4 ABY	Greg Rucka

=== The New Republic ===
Title	Publishing Date	Issue / Arc	Timeline	Author(s)
Ewoks #1–4	October 2024–January 2025	Caravan of Carnage	4 ABY	Steve Orlando
Battle Of Jakku — Insurgency Rising #1–4	October–November 2024	TBA	c. 4–5 ABY	Alex Segura
Battle Of Jakku — Republic Under Siege #1–4	November–December 2024	TBA	c. 4–5 ABY	Alex Segura
Battle Of Jakku — Last Stand #1–4	December 2024–January 2025	TBA	c. 4–5 ABY	Alex Segura
Star Wars: Doctor Aphra — Chaos Agent #1–	June 2025–	TBA	c. 5 ABY (TBC)	Cherish Chen
Star Wars (2025) #1–	May 2025–	TBA	c. 6 ABY	Alex Segura
The Mandalorian
The Book of Boba Fett
Ahsoka

=== Rise of the First Order ===
Title	Publishing Date	Issue / Arc	Timeline	Author(s)
The Rise Of Kylo Ren #1–4	December 2019–March 2020		28 ABY	Charles Soule
Life Day one-shot	November 2021	(Framing Sequence); Deck the Halls (flashback 231 BBY); Paid on Delivery (flashback 10 BBY); Gift of Light (flashback 0 ABY)		Jody Houser, Justina Ireland, Steve Orlando and Cavan Scott
Star Wars Special: C-3PO: The Phantom Limb one-shot	April 2016		c. 31–32 ABY	James Robinson
Poe Dameron #1–31, 2 annuals	April 2016–September 2018	#1–3 Black Squadron; SaBBotage by Chris Eliopoulos and Jordie Bellaire (mini-comic published in Issue #1, reprinted in Droids Unplugged 1); #4–6 Lockdown; #7–13 The Gathering Storm; #14–16 Legend Lost; Annual #1; #17–19 War Stories; #20–25 Legend Found; #26–31 The Awakening; Annual #2	32-34 ABY	Charles Soule Robert Thompson (Annual #1) Jody Houser (Annual #2)
Star Wars Resistance
Episode VII: The Force Awakens
Captain Phasma #1–4	September 2017		34 ABY	Kelly Thompson
The Last Jedi – DJ: Most Wanted one-shot	January 2018		34 ABY	Ben Acker and Ben Blacker
Episode VIII: The Last Jedi
Allegiance #1–4	October 2019	#1 An Old Hope; #2 Troubled Waters; #3 Dark Side of the Moon; #4 A Rising Tide	34 ABY	Ethan Sacks
Galaxy's Edge #1–5	April–August 2019	#1 Baiting the Hook; #2 Shoot First, Questions Later; #3 Honor Among Thieves; #4 The Betrayal of Khashyun; #5 A Double-Edged Sword	34 ABY	Ethan Sacks
Star Wars: Legacy Of Vader #1–	February 2025–	TBA	34-35 ABY	Charles Soule
Galactic Starcruiser: Halcyon Legacy #1–5	February–July 2022	#1 The Storm on the Horizon; #2 A Most Dangerous Gamble; #3 A Cause Worth Fighting For; #4 The Heist on the Halcyon; #5 The Path of the Sungrazer	35 ABY	Ethan Sacks
Episode IX: The Rise of Skywalker

=== Marvel anthology series ===
Title	Publishing Date	Issue / Arc	Author(s)
Star Wars: Age of Republic	December 2018–March 2019	Heroes; Qui-Gon Jinn #1: "Balance"; Obi-Wan Kenobi #1: "Mission"; Anakin Skywalker #1: The Sacrifice"; Padmé Amidala #1: "Bridge"; Villains; Darth Maul #1: "Ash"; Jango Fett #1: "Training"; Special #1: Asajj Ventress in "Sisters"; Captain Rex & Jar Jar Binks in "501 Plus One"; Mace Windu in "The Weapon"; Count Dooku #1: "The Cost"; General Grievous #1: "Burn"	Jody Houser
Star Wars: Age of Rebellion	April 2019–June 2019	Heroes; Princess Leia #1: "Princess Scoundrel"; Han Solo #1: "Running from the Rebellion"; Lando Calrissian #1: "Cloud City Blues"; Luke Skywalker #1: "Fight or Flight"; Villains; Grand Moff Tarkin #1: "Tooth and Claw"; Special #1: IG-88 in "The Long Game"; Biggs Darklighter & Jek Porkins in "Stolen Valor"; Yoda in "The Trials of Dagobah"; Boba Fett #1: "Hunter's Heart"; Jabba the Hutt #1: "Great to be Jabba"; Darth Vader #1: "To The Letter"	Jon Adams, Marc Guggenheim, Greg Pak, Simon Spurrier
Star Wars: Age of Resistance	July 2019–September 2019	Heroes; Finn #1: "Infestation"; Special #1: Maz Kanata in "Maz's Scoundrels"; Amylin Holdo in "The Bridge"; BB-8 in "Robot Resistance"; Poe Dameron #1:"Fight or Flight"; Rose Tico #1:"My Hero"; Rey #1:"Alone"; Villains; Captain Phasma #1: "Fallen Guns"; General Hux #1:"Marooned"; Supreme Leader Snoke #1:"Fail. Or Kill it."; Kylo Ren #1:"Out of the Shadow"	Chris Eliopoulos, Tom Taylor, G. Willow Wilson
Marvel Comics #1000	August 2019	"Red Four"	Charles Soule
Darth Vader – Black, White & Red #1–4	April 2023–July 2023	#1–4 "Hard Shutdown"; #1 "Inescapable" and "Dissolution of Hope"; #2 "The Endless Mercy" and "Power"; #3 "Annihilated" and "Diplomatic Impunity"; #4 "The Inhabitant" and "Return to Hoth"	Jason Aaron, Peach Momoko, Torunn Grønbekk

=== IDW Publishing anthology series ===
Title	Publishing Date	Issue / Arc	Author(s)
Star Wars Adventures (2017) #0–32, 2 annuals, 2 FCBD issues	July 2017–July 2020	#0–32; One-shots: Star Wars Adventures Free Comic Book Day 2018; Star Wars Adventures Annual 2018; Flight of the Falcon; Star Wars Adventures Free Comic Book Day 2019; Star Wars Adventures Annual 2019	Landry Q. Walker, Cavan Scott, Elsa Charretier, Alan Tudyk, Shannon Denton, Pierrick Colinet, Ben Acker, Ben Blacker, Delilah S. Dawson, Shaun Manning, Sholly Fisch, Otis Frampton, John Barber, Nick Brokenshire, John Jackson Miller
Star Wars Adventures: Destroyer Down	December 2017	"Destroyer Down" and "The Ghost Ship"	Scott Beatty.
Star Wars Forces of Destiny #1–5	January 2018	#1 Leia; #2 Rey; #3 Hera; #4 Ahsoka & Padmé; #5 Rose & Paige	Jody Houser, Delilah S. Dawson, Elsa Charretier, Beth Revis, and Devin Grayson.
Star Wars Adventures: Tales from Vader's Castle #1–5	October 2018		Cavan Scott
Star Wars Adventures: Return to Vader's Castle #1–5	October 2019		Cavan Scott
Star Wars Adventures: The Clone Wars – Battle Tales #1–5	May–September 2020		Michael Moreci
Star Wars Adventures (2020) #1–14, 2 annuals	October 2020–February 2022	#1–14; Star Wars Adventures Annual 2020; Star Wars Adventures Annual 2021	Michael Moreci, Nick Brokenshire, Landry Q. Walker
Star Wars Adventures: Shadow of Vader's Castle	November 2020		Cavan Scott
Star Wars Adventures: Smuggler's Run #1–2	December 2020–January 2021		Greg Rucka, Alec Worley
Star Wars Adventures: The Weapon of a Jedi #1–2	May–June 2021		Jason Fry, Alec Worley
Star Wars Adventures: Ghosts of Vader's Castle #1–5	September–October 2021		Cavan Scott

=== Dark Horse Comics anthology series ===
Title	Publishing Date	Issue / Arc	Author(s)
Star Wars: Hyperspace Stories #1–12, 1 special	August 2022–December 2023	#1–12; Hyperspace Stories Annual—Jaxxon 2023	Cecil Castellucci, Amanda Deibert, Michael Moreci
Tales from the Rancor Pit	November 2022	"Ghosts of the Machine"; "Undead or Alive"; "In the Lair of the Dragon Slug"	Cavan Scott
Tales from the Death Star	October 2023	"Nightmares Long Remembered"; "The Creature from the Trash Compactor"; "The Wild Squadron"; "We Shall Double Our Efforts"; "The Haunting of Grand Moff Tarkin"	Cavan Scott

=== Comic strips ===
==== Star Wars Rebels comic strips ====
The Star Wars Rebels comic strips are set in-between episodes of the Disney XD television show of the same name. The first 37 strips were published in the monthly Germany, UK, and U.S.A. Star Wars Rebels Magazine issues, which debuted in January 2015. The UK and U.S.A. versions were discontinued in 2016, with the German version being discontinued in 2017. After issue, 39, the strips were published in the bimonthly German magazine Star Wars Rebels Animation-Magazine. Trade paperback volumes have also been released in Germany and France. In 2022, Dark Horse published a trade paperback collection of all strips in English language.

===== Star Wars Rebels Magazine strips =====
All comics from this magazine were written by Martin Fisher and Jeremy Barlow.

- Volume 1: Resistance (March 2016)
  - Ring Race (Issue #1)
  - Learning Patience (Issue #2)
  - The fake Jedi (Issue #3)
  - Kallus' Hunt (Issue #4)
  - Return of the Slavers (Issue #5)
  - Eyes on the Prize (Issue #6)
  - Sabotaged Supplies (Issue #7, reprinted in Issue #36)
  - Ezra's Vision (Issue #8, reprinted in Issue #38)
- Volume 2: Changes (September 2016)
  - Senate Perspective (Issue #9)
  - Becoming Hunted (Issue #10)
  - Assessment (Issue #11)
  - Ocean Rescue (Issue #12)
  - Secrets of Sienar (Issue #13)
  - No Sympathy (Issue #14)
  - A Day's Duty (Issue #15)
  - Ice Breaking (Issue #16)
- Volume 3: Rebellion at the Edge of the Galaxy (July 2017)
  - Vulnerable Areas (Issue #17)
  - Academy Cadets (Issue #18)
  - Escaping the Scrap Pile (Issue #19)
  - The Gangsters of Galzez (Issue #20)
  - Puffer Problems (Issue #21)
  - The Thune Cargo (Issue #22)
  - Always Bet on Chop (Issue #23)
  - The Second Chance (Issue #24)
- Uncollected
  - The Ballad of 264 (Issue #25)
  - The Line of Duty (Issue #26)
  - A Time to Survive (Issue #27)
  - Too Late to Change (Issue #28)
  - The Size of the Fight (Issue #29)
  - The Wrong Crowd (Issue #30)
  - Off the Rails (Issue #31)
  - To Thy Metal Heart be True (Issue #32)
  - Sons of the Sky (Issue #33)
  - Final Round (Issue #34)
  - A Youth Unpromising (Issue #35)
  - Fifth and Final (Issue #37)
  - Never Far Behind (Issue #39)

===== Star Wars Rebels Animation-Magazine strips =====
All comics from this magazine were written by Alec Worley.

- Uncollected
  - A Trooper's Worth (Issue #1)
  - Divide and Conquer (Issue #2)
  - The Beast Within (Issue #3)
  - Crossing the Line (Issue #4)

==== Star Wars Resistance comic strips ====
The Star Wars Resistance comic strips are adaptations of episodes of the Disney XD television show of the same name. The strips were published in the monthly German Star Wars Resistance Animation-Magazine issues, which debuted in May 2019, however it was discontinued after four issues. A fifth strip was included in Star Wars Fun & Action.

===== Star Wars Resistance Animation-Magazine strips =====
All comics from this magazine were written by Alec Worley.

- The Recruit, Part 1 (Issue #1)
- The Recruit, Part 2 (Issue #2)
- The Triple Dark (Issue #3)
- Fuel for the Fire (Issue #4)

===== Star Wars Fun & Action strips =====
Most comics in Star Wars Fun & Action were reprints of previous Star Wars Adventures comics

- The High Tower by Alec Worley

=== Animated webcomics ===
In September 2015, multinational food and beverage company Nestlé released two animated webcomics as part of a licensed Star Wars-themed promotional campaign for The Force Awakens. Adapted from the novels The Weapon of a Jedi: A Luke Skywalker Adventure by Jason Fry and Smuggler's Run: A Han Solo & Chewbacca Adventure by Greg Rucka, the two animated comics were originally offered exclusively on the now-defunct Nestlé Comics website by typing a digital code featured on every box of Nestlé cereals.

=== Novel adaptations into German comics ===
The comics listed here are licensed by Disney, but were not released by Marvel or Disney-Lucasfilm Press. Their canonical status is disputed due to some minor changes made to the story due to cultural interpretation.

==== Star Wars: Weapon of a Jedi (2017) ====
Star Wars: Weapon of a Jedi is a four-part German comic adaptation of the Jason Fry novel of the same name by Alec Worley. The comics are available in Issues #19–22 of Star Wars Magazin, published by Panini Comics. A trade paperback volume has been released in March 2018, and eventually an English translation will released in May 2021 as Star Wars Adventures: Weapon of a Jedi. Set in the Rise of the Empire Era, between Episode IV: A New Hope and Episode V: The Empire Strikes Back.

- Issue #19, Comic #1 (March 2017)
- Issue #20, Comic #2 (May 2017)
- Issue #21, Comic #3 (July 2017)
- Issue #22, Comic #4 (September 2017)

==== Star Wars: Smuggler's Run (2018) ====
Star Wars: Smuggler's Run is a four-part German comic adaptation of the Greg Rucka novel of the same name by Alec Worley. The comics are available in Issues #1–4 of Das Star Wars Universum, published by Panini Comics, and eventually, an English translation was released in 2020-2021 as Star Wars Adventures: Smuggler's Run. Set in the Rise of the Empire Era, between Episode IV: A New Hope and Episode V: The Empire Strikes Back.

- Issue #1, Comic #1 (January 2018)
- Issue #2, Comic #2 (February 2018)
- Issue #3, Comic #3 (March 2018)
- Issue #4, Comic #4 (April 2018)

=== Cancelled canon comics ===
The following comics have been officially announced, but have not been released or officially cancelled.

Title	Intended Publication Date	Cancellation Date	Publisher
Luke versus the Imperial Guard one-shot	Unknown	November 2017	Marvel Comics
Star Wars Forces of Destiny: May the Force Be with Us Cinestory Comic	March 2019	April 2019	Joe Books Ltd
Grand Admiral Thrawn: A Star Wars Rebels Cinestory Comic	March 2019	April 2019	Joe Books Ltd
Star Wars: Shadow of Vader	July 2019	November 2018	Marvel Comics
Star Wars Rebels: Ahsoka Cinestory Comic	August 2019	April 2019	Joe Books Ltd
Star Wars Forces of Destiny: Strength and Hope Cinestory Comic	August 2019	April 2019	Joe Books Ltd
Star Wars: The Empire Strikes Back Cinestory Comic	September 2019	April 2019	Joe Books Ltd
Star Wars: Return of the Jedi Cinestory Comic	September 2019	April 2019	Joe Books Ltd
Star Wars: Galaxy's Edge Kids Comic	Fall 2019	Fall 2019	IDW Publishing

== Star Wars Legends comics original stories ==
=== Before the Republic era (37,000–25,000 BBY) ===
Title	Publishing Date	Issue / Arc	Timeline	Author(s)
Dawn of the Jedi: Force Storm #1–5	February–June 2012		25,793 BBY	John Ostrander
Dawn of the Jedi: The Prisoner of Bogan #1–5	November 2012–May 2013		25,793 BBY	John Ostrander
Dawn of the Jedi: Force War #1–5	November 2013–March 2014		25,792 BBY	John Ostrander

=== Old Republic Era / The Sith era (5,000–1,000 BBY) ===
Title	Publishing Date	Issue / Arc	Timeline	Author(s)
Tales of the Jedi: Golden Age of the Sith #0–5	July 1996–February 1997		5,000 BBY	Kevin J. Anderson
Tales of the Jedi: The Fall of the Sith Empire #1–5	June–October 1997		4,990 BBY	Kevin J. Anderson
Tales of the Jedi: Knights of the Old Republic #1–5	October 1993–February 1994	#1–2 Ulic Qel-Droma and the Beast Wars of Onderon; #3–5 The Saga of Nomi Sunrider	4,000–3,999 BBY	Tom Veitch
Tales of the Jedi: The Freedon Nadd Uprising #1–2	August–September 1994		3,998 BBY	Tom Veitch
Tales of the Jedi: Dark Lords of the Sith #0–6	September 1994–March 1995		3,996 BBY	Tom Veitch and Kevin J. Anderson
Tales of the Jedi: The Sith War #1–6	August 1995–January 1996		3,996 BBY	Kevin J. Anderson
Tales of the Jedi: Redemption #1–5	July–November 1998		3,986 BBY	Kevin J. Anderson
Knights of the Old Republic #0–50	March 2006–February 2010	#0 Crossroads; #1–6 Commencement; #7–8, #10 Flashpoint; #9 Flashpoint Interlude: Homecoming; #11–12 Reunion; #13–15 Days of Fear; #16–18 Nights of Anger; #19–21 Daze of Hate; #22–24 Knights of Suffering; #25–28 Vector; #29–30 Exalted; #31 Turnabout; #32–35 Vindication; #36–37 Prophet Motive; #38 Faithful Execution; #39–41 Dueling Ambitions; #42 Masks; #43–44 The Reaping; #45–46 Destroyer; #47–50 Demon	3964–3963 BBY	John Jackson Miller
Knights of the Old Republic: War #1–5	January–May 2012		3,962 BBY	John Jackson Miller
The Old Republic #1–6	July–December 2010	#1–3 Threat of Peace; #4–6 Blood of the Empire	3,678–3,653 BBY	Robert Chestney, Alexander Freed
The Old Republic—The Lost Suns #1–5	June–October 2011		3,643 BBY	Alexander Freed
Lost Tribe of the Sith—Spiral #1–5	August–December 2012		2974 BBY	John Jackson Miller
Knight Errant: Aflame #0–5	October 2010–February 2011		1,032 BBY	John Jackson Miller
Knight Errant: Deluge #1–5	August–December 2011		1,032 BBY	John Jackson Miller
Knight Errant: Escape #1–5	June–October 2011		1,032 BBY	John Jackson Miller
Jedi vs. Sith #1–6	April–September 2001		1,000 BBY	Darko Macan

=== Rise of the Empire era (1,000–0 BBY) ===
Title	Publishing Date	Issue / Arc	Timeline	Author(s)
Jedi—The Dark Side #1–5	May 2011–March 2012		53 BBY	Scott Allie
Qui-Gon and Obi-Wan: The Aurorient Express #1–2	February 2002–June 2002		38 BBY	Mike Kennedy
Qui-Gon and Obi-Wan: Last Stand on Ord Mantell #1–3	December 2000–March 2001		37 BBY	Ryder Windham
Dark Horse Presents Annual 2000	June 2000	"Aurra's Song"	36 BBY	Dean Motter
Republic #0–83: (titled Star Wars for #0–45)	December 1998–February 2006	#1–6 Prelude to Rebellion; #4–6 Vow of Justice (67 BBY, backup); #7–12 Outlander; #13–18 Emissaries to Malastare; #19–22 Twilight; #23–26 Infinity's End; #27 Starcrash; #28–31 The Hunt for Aurra Sing; #32–35 Darkness; #36–39 The Stark Hyperspace War; #40–41 The Devaronian Version; #42–45 Rite of Passage; #46–48 Honor and Duty; #49 Sacrifice; #50 The Battle of Kamino; #51–52 The New Face of War; #53 Blast Radius; #54 Double Blind; #55–58 The Battle of Jabiim; #59 Enemy Lines; #60 Hate and Fear; #61 Dead Ends; #62 No Man's Land; #63 Striking from the Shadows; #64 Bloodlines; #65–66 Show of Force; #67 Forever Young; #68 Armor; #69–71 The Dreadnaughts of Rendili; #72–73 Trackdown; #74–77 Siege of Saleucami; #78 Loyalties; #79–80 Into the Unknown; #81–83 The Hidden Enemy	33–19 BBY	Jan Strnad, Timothy Truman, Pat Mills, John Ostrander
Jedi Council: Acts of War #1–4	June–September 2000		33 BBY	Randy Stradley
Darth Maul #1–4	September–December 2000		32.5 BBY	Ron Marz
Star Wars: Episode I – The Phantom Menace
Episode I Adventures	May–July 1999	Anakin Skywalker; Queen Amidala; Qui-Gon Jinn; Obi-Wan Kenobi; The Phantom Menace ½	32 BBY	Timothy Truman, Mark Schultz, Ryder Windham, Henry Gilroy
Podracing Tales (online comic)	December 2000		32 BBY	Ryder Windham
Jango Fett: Open Seasons #1–4	May–September 2002		32 BBY	Haden Blackman
Dark Horse Extra #35–37	May–July 2001	"Heart of Fire"	30 BBY	John Ostrander
Jedi Quest #1–4	September–December 2001		28 BBY	Ryder Windham
Jango Fett	March 2002		27 BBY	Ron Marz
Zam Wesell	March 2002		27 BBY	Ron Marz
The Bounty Hunters: Aurra Sing	August 1999		27 BBY	Timothy Truman
Dark Horse Extra #44–47	February 2002	"Poison Moon"	25 BBY	Michael Carriglitto
Starfighter: Crossbones #1–3	January–March 2002		24 BBY	Haden Blackman
Star Wars: Episode II – Attack of the Clones
Hasbro/Toys "R" Us Exclusive #1–4	May–July 2002	Full of Surprises; Most Precious Weapon; Practice Makes Perfect; Machines of War	23 BBY	Jason Hall
Jedi	February 2003–July 2004	Jedi: Mace Windu; Jedi: Shaak Ti; Jedi: Aayla Secura; Jedi: Dooku; Jedi: Yoda	22–21 BBY	John Ostrander
Clone Wars Adventures Volume 1	July 2004	"Blind Force"; "Heavy Metal Jedi"; "Fierce Currents"	22 BBY	Haden Blackman
Clone Wars Adventures Volume 2	November 2004	"Skywalkers"; "Hide in Plain Sight"; "Run Mace Run"	22 BBY	Haden Blackman, Welles Hartley, Matthew and Shawn Fillbach
Clone Wars Adventures Volume 3	March 2005	"Rogues Gallery"; "The Package"; "Stranger in Town"; "One Battle"	22 BBY	Haden Blackman, Matthew and Shawn Fillbach, Bytim Mucci
Clone Wars Adventures Volume 4	October 2005	"Another Fine Mess"; "The Brink"; "Orders"; "Descent"	22 BBY	Matthew and Shawn Fillbach, Justin Lambros, Ryan Kaufman, Haden Blackman
Clone Wars Adventures Volume 5	April 2006	"What Goes Up..."; "Bailed Out"; "Heroes on Both Sides"; "The Order of Outcasts"	22–19 BBY	Chris Avellone, W. Haden Blackman, Matthew Fillbach, Shawn Fillbach, Matt Jacobs, Ryan Kaufman, Justin Lambros
Clone Wars Adventures Volume 6	August 2006	"It Takes a Thief"; "The Drop"; "To the Vanishing Point"; "Means and Ends"	22–19 BBY	Thomas Andrews, W. Haden Blackman, Matthew Fillbach, Shawn Fillbach, Mike Kennedy
Clone Wars Adventures Volume 7	January 2007	"Creature Comfort"; "Spy Girls"; "Impregnable"; "This Precious Shining"	22 BBY	Chris Avellone, Jeremy Barlow, Matthew Fillbach, Shawn Fillbach, Ryan Kaufman
Clone Wars Adventures Volume 8	June 2007	"Versus"; "Old Scores"; "One of a Kind"; "Pathways"	22 BBY	Chris Avellone, Jeremy Barlow, Matthew Fillbach, Shawn Fillbach, Jason Hall
Clone Wars Adventures Volume 9	October 2007	"Appetite for Adventure"; "Salvaged"; "Life Below"; "No Way Out"	22 BBY	Matthew and Shawn Fillbach
Clone Wars Adventures Volume 10	December 2007	"Graduation Day"; "Thunder Road"; "Chain of Command"; "Waiting"	22 BBY	Chris Avellone, Matthew and Shawn Fillbach, Jason Hall
The Clone Wars (webcomics)	October 2, 2008–April 2011		22 BBY	
The Clone Wars (graphic novellas)	September 2008–June 2013	Shipyards of Doom; Crash Course; The Wind Raiders of Taloraan; The Colossus of Destiny; Deadly Hands of Shon-Ju; The Starcrusher Trap; Strange Allies; The Enemy Within; The Sith Hunters; Defenders of the Lost Temple; The Smuggler's Code	22–19 BBY	Henry Gilroy, John Ostrander
The Clone Wars #1–12	September 2008–January 2010	#1–6 Slaves of the Republic; #7–9 In the Service of the Republic; #10–12 Hero of the Confederacy	21 BBY	Henry Gilroy, Steven Melching
2009 Free Comic Book Day	May 2009	Gauntlet of Death	21 BBY	Henry Gilroy
General Grievous #1–4	March–July 2005		20 BBY	Chuck Dixon
2006 Free Comic Book Day	May 2009	Routine Valor	20 BBY	Randy Stradley
Darth Maul—Death Sentence #1–4	July–October 2012		20 BBY	Tom Taylor
Obsession #1–5	November 2004–May 2005		19.5 BBY	Haden Blackman
2005 Free Comic Book Day	May 2005	Unnamed	19.5 BBY	Miles Lane
Evasive Action	October 2004–November 2006	Reversal of Fortune; Recruitment; Prey; End Game	19–18 BBY	Paul Ens
Star Wars: Episode III – Revenge of the Sith
Purge one-shots	December 2005–January 2013	Purge; Purge: Seconds to Die; Purge: The Hidden Blade; Purge – The Tyrant's Fist 1; Purge – The Tyrant's Fist 2	19 BBY	John Ostrander, W. Haden Blackman, Alexander Freed
Darth Vader and the Lost Command #1–5	January–May 2011		19 BBY	Hayden Blackman
Dark Times #0–17	November 2006–June 2010	#1–5 The Path to Nowhere; #6–10 Parallels; #11–12 Vector; #0, 13–17 Blue Harvest	19 BBY	Mick Harrison
Dark Times—Out of the Wilderness #1–5	August 2011–April 2012		19 BBY	Mick Harrison
Darth Vader and the Ghost Prison #1–5	May–September 2012		19 BBY	Hayden Blackman
Dark Times—Fire Carrier #1–5	February–June 2013		19 BBY	Mick Harrison
Dark Times—A Spark Remains #1–5	July–December 2013		19 BBY	Mick Harrison
Darth Vader and the Ninth Assassin #1–5	April–August 2013		19 BBY	Tim Siedell
Darth Vader and the Cry of Shadows #1–5	December 2013–April 2014		19 BBY	Tim Siedell
Droids (1986) #1–8	February 1986–March 1987		15–0 BBY	David Manak
Blood Ties: Boba Fett is Dead #1–4	April–July 2012		10 BBY	Tom Taylor
Droids (1994) #1–6, 2 specials	April 1994–January 1995	#1–6 The Kalarba Adventures; Droids Special #1; Artoo's Day Out	5.5 BBY	Dan Thorsland
Droids (1995) #1–8, 1 special	April–December 1995	#1–4 Rebellion; #5–8 Season of Revolt; The Protocol Offensive	5.5 BBY	Dan Thorsland, Ryder Windham, Jan Strnad, Anthony Daniels
Dark Horse Presents Annual 1999	August 1999	"Luke Skywalker's Walkabout"	5 BBY	Phill Norwood
Jabba the Hutt one-shots	April 1995–February 1996	The Gaar Suppoon Hit; The Hunger of Princess Nampi; The Dynasty Trap; Betrayal	5 BBY	Jim Woodring
Boba Fett: Enemy of the Empire #1–4	January–April 1999		3 BBY	John Wagner
The Empire Strikes Back Monthly #157: reprinted in Devilworlds #2, 1996	1982	The Flight of the Falcon	3 BBY	Steve Parkhouse
Agent of the Empire—Iron Eclipse #1–5	December 2011–April 2012		3 BBY	John Ostrander
Agent of the Empire—Hard Targets #1–5	October 2012–February 2013		3 BBY	John Ostrander
Blood Ties: A Tale of Jango and Boba Fett #1–4	August–November 2010		2 BBY (Note: flashbacks in 22 BBY)	
Han Solo at Stars' End: Adaptation of the novel	October 1980–February 1981		2–1 BBY	Archie Goodwin
The Force Unleashed: Adaptation of the video game	August 2008		2 BBY	Haden Blackman
The Force Unleashed II: Adaptation of the video game	September 2010		1 BBY	Haden Blackman
Han Solo and the Hollow Moon of Khorya	April 2009		1 BBY	Jeremy Barlow
A Decade of Dark Horse #2	August 1996	"This Crumb for Hire"	1 BBY	Ryder Windham
Dark Forces: Soldier for the Empire	February 1997		1 BBY	William C. Dietz
Underworld: The Yavin Vassilika	December 2000–June 2001		1 BBY	Mike Kennedy
Star Wars Weekly #94–96	December 1979	"Way of the Wookiee!"	1 BBY	Archie Goodwin

=== Rebellion era (0 BBY–5 ABY) ===
Title	Publishing Date	Issue / Arc	Timeline	Author(s)
Star Wars: Episode IV – A New Hope
Star Wars (1977) #1–38, Annual #1	April 1977–May 1980	#1–6 Star Wars: A New Hope; #7 New Planets, New Perils; #8 Eight for Aduba-3; #9 Showdown on a Wasteland World; #10 Behemoth from the World Below; #11 Star Search; #12 Doomworld; #13 Day of the Dragon Lords; #14 The Sound of Armageddon; #15 Star Duel; #16 The Hunter; #17 Crucible; #18 The Empire Strikes; #19 The Ultimate Gamble; #20 Deathgame; #21 Shadow of a Dark Lord; #22 To the Last Gladiator; #23 Flight Into Fury; #24 Silent Drifting; #25 Siege at Yavin; #26 Doom Mission; #27 Return of the Hunter; #28 What Ever Happened to Jabba the Hut?; #29 Dark Encounter; #30 A Princess Alone; #31 Return to Tatooine; #32 The Jawa Express; #33 Saber Clash; #34 Thunder in the Stars; #35 Dark Lord's Gambit; #36 Red Queen Rising; #37 In Mortal Combat; #38 Riders in the Void; Annual #1 The Long Hunt	0 BBY–0.5 ABY	Archie Goodwin
Pizzazz #1-16, Star Wars Weekly #60	October 1977–January 1979	#1-9 The Keeper's World; #10-16 The Kingdom of Ice	0 ABY	Roy Thomas, Archie Goodwin
Star Wars Weekly #97–99, 104–115	January–May 1980	#97 "The Day after the Death Star!"; #98 "Space Duel!"; #99 "Empire Kills!"; #104 "The Weapons Master!"; #105 "Day of the Assassins!"; #106 "My Enemies Surround Me!"; #107 "World of Fire!"; #108 "Star Terror!"; #109 "Molten Doom!"; #110 "The Word for World is Death!"; #111 "Unholy Alliance!"; #112 "A Creature in the Stars!"; #113 "The Guardian of Forever!"; #114 "Betrayal!"; #115 "The Monster's Secret!"	0 ABY	Archie Goodwin, Chris Claremont
Star Wars (Newspaper Comic Strips)	1979–1984	Gambler's World; The Constancia Affair; The Kashyyyk Depths; Tatooine Sojourn; Princess Leia, Imperial Servant; The Second Kessel Run; Bring Me the Children; As Long As We Live; The Frozen World of Ota; Planet of Kadril; Han Solo at Stars' End; The Bounty Hunter of Ord Mantell; Darth Vader Strikes; The Serpent Masters; Deadly Reunion; Traitor's Gambit; The Night Beast; The Return of Ben Kenobi; The Power Gem; Iceworld; Revenge of the Jedi; Doom Mission; Race for Survival; The Paradise Detour; A New Beginning; Showdown; The Final Trap	0 ABY	Russ Manning, Steve Gerber, Archie Goodwin as Russ Helm
Empire #1–40	September 2002–March 2006	#1–4 Betrayal; #5–6 Princess... Warrior; #7 Sacrifice; #8–9, 12, 15 Darklighter; #10–11 The Short, Happy Life of Roons Sewell; #13 What Sin Loyalty?; #14 The Savage Heart; #16–18 To the Last Man; #19 Target: Vader; #20–21 A Little Piece of Home; #22 Alone Together; #23 The Bravery of Being Out of Range; #24–25 Idiot's Array; #26–27 "General" Skywalker; #28 Wreckage; #29–30, 32–34 In the Shadows of Their Fathers; #31 The Price of Power; #35 A Model Officer; #36–40 The Wrong Side of the War	1 BBY–0.5 ABY	Scott Allie, Paul Chadwick, Jeremy Barlow, Paul Alden, Welles Hartley, Ron Marz, Thomas Andrews, John Jackson Miller
Vader's Quest #1–4	February–May 1999		0 ABY	Darko Macan
Star Wars (2013)	January 2013–August 2014	1–6 In the Shadow of Yavin; 7–12 From the Ruins of Alderaan; 13–14 Five Days of Sith; 15–18 Rebel Girl; 19–20 A Shattered Hope	0 ABY	Brian Wood
River of Chaos #1–4	June–October 1995		0 ABY	Louise Simonson
Shadow Stalker	January–November 1997		0 ABY	Ryder Windham
Star Wars 3-D #1–3	December 1987–Fall 1988		0 ABY	Len Wein, John Stephenson
Rebellion #0–16	March 2006–August 2008	#0 Crossroads; #1–5 My Brother, My Enemy; #6–10 The Ahakista Gambit; #11–14 Small Victories; #15–16 Vector	0 ABY	Thomas Andrews, Rob Williams, Brandon Badeaux, Jeremy Barlow
Rookies	February–October 2006	Rookies: Rendezvous; Rookies: No Turning Back	0 ABY	Pablo Hidalgo
Chewbacca and the Slavers of the Shadowlands	August 2011		0 ABY (Note: flashbacks in 185 BBY)	Chris Cerasi
The Empire Strikes Back Monthly #149, 151, 153–156: reprinted in Devilworlds #1–2	September 1981May 1982	The Pandora Effect; Dark Knight's Devilry; Tilotny Throws a Shape; Dark Lord's Conscience; Rust Never Sleeps	0–3 ABY	Alan Moore, Steve Moore
Splinter of the Mind's Eye #1–4: Adaptation of the novel	December 1995 – June 1996		2 ABY	Alan Dean Foster, Terry Austin
Princess Leia and the Royal Ransom	August 2009		2 ABY	Jeremy Barlow, Carlo Soriano
Boba Fett and the Ship of Fear	April 2011		2 ABY	Jeremy Barlow, Carlo Soriano
Rebel Heist #1–4	April–July 2014		3 ABY	Matt Kindt
A Valentine Story	February 2003	"Breaking the Ice"	3 ABY	Judd Winick, Paul Chadwick
Star Wars: Episode V – The Empire Strikes Back
Star Wars (1977) #39–80, Annual #2–3	June 24, 1980–November 1983	The Empire Strikes Back; Death Probe by Archie Goodwin; The Dreams of Cody Sunn-Childe by J. M. DeMatteis; Droid World by Archie Goodwin; The Third Law by Larry Hama; The Last Jedi by Mike W. Barr; The Crimson Forever by Archie Goodwin; Resurrection of Evil by David Michelinie; To Take The Tarkin by David Michelinie; The Last Gift From Alderaan by Chris Claremont; to be added	3–4 ABY	to be added
Luke Skywalker and the Treasure of the Dragonsnakes	February 2010		3 ABY	Tom Taylor
The Will of Darth Vader	July 2010		3 ABY	Tom Taylor
Shadows of the Empire #1–6	May–October 1996		3 ABY	John Wagner
Tales from Mos Eisley	March 1996	"Light Duty"; "Mostly Automatic"; "Heggs' Tale"	3 ABY	Bruce Jones
The Bounty Hunters: Scoundrel's Wages	September 1999		3 ABY	Mark Schultz
Ewoks (1985) #1–14	May 1985–July 1987		3 ABY	David Manak
Battle of the Bounty Hunters	July 23 1996		3 ABY	Ryder Windham
Star Wars: Episode VI – Return of the Jedi
Return of the Jedi #1–4	October 1983–January 1984		4 ABY	Archie Goodwin
Star Wars (1977) #81–108	December 1983–June 1986, May 2019	to be added	4–5 ABY	to be added
Mara Jade – By the Emperor's Hand #1–6	July 1998–February 1999		4 ABY	Timothy Zahn, Michael A. Stackpole
X-Wing: Rogue Leader #1–3	September–November 2005		4 ABY	Haden Blackman
Shadows of the Empire: Evolution #1–5	February 1998–June 1998		4 ABY	Steve Perry
The Jabba Tape	December 1998		4 ABY	John Wagner

=== New Republic era (5–25 ABY) ===
Title	Publishing Date	Issue / Arc	Timeline	Author(s)
Boba Fett: Agent of Doom	November 2000		5 ABY	John Ostrander
X-Wing Rogue Squadron #1–35, ½, 1 special	July 1995–November 1998	#1–4 The Rebel Opposition; #5–8 The Phantom Affair; #9–12 Battleground: Tatooine; #13–16 The Warrior Princess; #17–20 Requiem for a Rogue; #21–24 In the Empire's Service; #25 The Making of Baron Fel; #26–27 Family Ties; #28–31 Masquerade; #32–35 Mandatory Retirement	5 ABY	Michael A. Stackpole, Darko Macan, Jan Strnad, Scott Tolson, Mike W. Barr
Dark Forces: Rebel Agent	March 1998		6 ABY	William C. Dietz
Dark Forces: Jedi Knight	October 1998		6 ABY	William C. Dietz
Heir to the Empire #1–6: Adaptation of the novel	October 1995–April 1996		9 ABY	Timothy Zahn, Mike Baron
Dark Force Rising #1–6: Adaptation of the novel	May 1997–October 1997		9 ABY	Timothy Zahn, Mike Baron
The Last Command #1–6: Adaptation of the novel	November 1997–July 1998		9 ABY	Timothy Zahn, Mike Baron
Dark Empire #1–6	December 1991–October 1992		10 ABY	Tom Veitch
Dark Empire II #1–6	December 1994–May 1995		10 ABY	Tom Veitch
Boba Fett	December 1995–April 2006	Bounty on Bar-Kooda; When the Fat Lady Swings; Murder Most Foul; Twin Engines of Destruction; Agent of Doom; Overkill; Salvage	5–10 ABY	John Wagner, Andy Mangels, John Ostrander, Jeremy Barlow
Empire's End #1–2	October 1995–November 1995	#1 Triumph of the Empire; #2 Rage of the Emperor	11 ABY	Tom Veitch
Crimson Empire #1–6	December 1997–May 1998		11 ABY	Mike Richardson, Randy Stradley
Crimson Empire II: Council of Blood #1–6	November 1998–April 1999		11 ABY	Mike Richardson, Randy Stradley
Kenix Kil (published in The Bounty Hunters)	October 1999		11 ABY	Randy Stradley
Dark Horse Extra #21–24	March 2000	Hard Currency	11 ABY	Randy Stradley
The Third Time Pays for All (published in Dark Horse Presents #1)	April 2011		13 ABY	Randy Stradley
Crimson Empire III—Empire Lost #1–6	October 2011–April 2012		13 ABY	Mike Richardson, Randy Stradley
Jedi Academy: Leviathan #1–4	October 1998–January 1999		13 ABY	Kevin J. Anderson
Union #1–4	November 1999–February 2000		20 ABY	Michael A. Stackpole

=== New Jedi Order era (25–36 ABY) ===
Title	Publishing Date	Issue / Arc	Timeline	Author(s)
Chewbacca (2000) #1–4	January–April 2000		25 ABY	Darko Macan
Invasion #0–5	October–November 2009	#0–5 Refugees	25 ABY	Tom Taylor
Invasion: Rescues #1–6	May–December 2010		25 ABY	Tom Taylor
Invasion: Revelations #1–5	July–November 2011		25 ABY	Tom Taylor

=== Legacy era (37 ABY onwards) ===
Title	Publishing Date	Issue / Arc	Timeline	Author(s)
Legacy #0, 0½, 1–50	June 2006–August 2010	#1–3, 5–7 Broken; #4 Noob; #8 Allies; #9–10 Trust Issues; #11–12 The Ghosts of Ossus; #13 Ready To Die; #14–19 Claws of the Dragon; #20–21 Indomitable; #22 The Wrath of the Dragon; #23–24 Loyalties; #25–26 The Hidden Temple; #27 Into the Core; #28–31 Vector; #32–33 Fight Another Day; #34–35 Storms; #36 Renegade; #37–40 Tatooine; #41 Rogue's End; #42 Divided Loyalties; #43–46 Monster; #47 The Fate of Dac; #48–50 Extremes	130 ABY	John Ostrander
Legacy—War #1–6	December 2010–May 2011		138 ABY	John Ostrander
Legacy Volume 2 #1–18	March 2013–August 2014	#1–5 Prisoner of the Floating World; #6–10 Outcasts of the Broken Ring; #11–15 Wanted: Ania Solo; #16–18 Empire of One	138–140 ABY	Corinna Bechko, Gabriel Hardman

=== Star Wars Tales ===
Title	Publishing Date	Issue / Arc	Timeline	Author(s)
Star Wars Tales	September 1999–October 2004	#23 "Shadows and Light"	3993 BBY	Joshua Ortega
Star Wars Tales	September 1999–October 2004	#24 "Unseen, Unheard"	3952 BBY	Chris Avellone
Star Wars Tales	September 1999–October 2004	#17 "The Apprentice"	1000 BBY	Mike Denning
Star Wars Tales	September 1999–October 2004	#17 "All For You"	996 BBY	Adam Gallardo
Star Wars Tales	September 1999–October 2004	#16 "Heart of Darkness"	700 BBY	Paul Lee
Star Wars Tales	September 1999–October 2004	#13 "Stones"	58 BBY	Haden Blackman
Star Wars Tales	September 1999–October 2004	#5 "Yaddle's Tale: The One Below"	c. 44–37 BBY (Note: Flashback to 200 years prior)	Dean Motter
Star Wars Tales	September 1999–October 2004	#20 "George R. Binks"	c. 43 BBY	Tony Millionaire
Star Wars Tales	September 1999–October 2004	#13 "Survivors"	before 32 BBY	Jim Krueger
Star Wars Tales	September 1999–October 2004	#14 "Mythology"	before 32 BBY	Chris Eliopoulos
Star Wars Tales	September 1999–October 2004	#13 "The Secret of Tet Ami"	43 BBY	Fabian Nicieza
Star Wars Tales	September 1999–October 2004	#12 "Once Bitten"	37 BBY	C. B. Cebulski
Star Wars Tales	September 1999–October 2004	#13 "Children of the Force"	36 BBY	Jason Hall
Star Wars Tales	September 1999–October 2004	#10 "Nameless"	34 BBY	Christian Read
Star Wars Tales	September 1999–October 2004	#24 "Marked"	33 BBY	Rob Williams
Star Wars Tales	September 1999–October 2004	#14 "Urchins"	33 BBY	Stan Sakai
Star Wars Tales	September 1999–October 2004	#5 "A Summer's Dream"	33 BBY	Terry Moore
Star Wars Tales	September 1999–October 2004	#1 "Life, Death, and the Living Force"	33 BBY	Jim Woodring
Star Wars Tales	September 1999–October 2004	#2 "Incident at Horn Station"	33 BBY	Dan Jolley
Star Wars Tales	September 1999–October 2004	#7 "Single Cell"	32.5 BBY	Haden Blackman
Star Wars Tales	September 1999–October 2004	#3 "The Death of Captain Tarpals"	32.5 BBY	Ryder Windham
Star Wars Tales	September 1999–October 2004	#3 "Deal with a Demon"	32 BBY	John Ostrander
Star Wars Tales	September 1999–October 2004	#21–24 "Nomad"	32 BBY	Rob Williams
Star Wars Tales	September 1999–October 2004	#8 "Bad Business"	30 BBY	John Ostrander
Star Wars Tales	September 1999–October 2004	#13 "The Sith in Shadow"	27 BBY	Bob Harris
Star Wars Tales	September 1999–October 2004	#12 "A Jedi's Weapon"	24 BBY	Henry Gilroy
Star Wars Tales	September 1999–October 2004	#13 "Puzzle Peace"	24 BBY	Scott Beatty
Star Wars Tales	September 1999–October 2004	#18 "Way of the Warrior"	23 BBY	Peter Alilunas

22 BBY

- "Nobody's Perfect" by Peter Bagge (published in Tales #20)
- "The Lesson" by Adam Gallardo (published in Tales #14)
- "Tides of Terror" by Milton Freewater Jr. (published in Tales #14)
- "Dark Journey" by Jason Hall (published in Tales #17)

21 BBY

- "Honor Bound" by Ian Edginton (published in Tales #22)
- "Rather Darkness Visible" by Jeremy Barlow (published in Tales #19)

18 BBY

- "The Duty" by Christian Read (published in Tales #12)

18–5 BBY

- "The Value of Proper Intelligence to Any Successful Military Campaign is Not to be Underestimated" by Ken Lizzi (published in Tales #19)

12 BBY

- "Ghost" by Jan Duursema (published in Tales #11)
- "Fortune, Fate, and the Natural History of the Sarlacc" by Mark Schultz (published in Tales #6)

11 BBY

- "Nerf Herder" by Phil Amara (published in Tales #7)

8 BBY

- "Luke Skywalker: Detective" by Rick Geary (published in Tales #20)
- "Sandstorm" by Jason Hall (published in Tales #15)

7 BBY

- "Number Two in the Galaxy" by Henry Gilroy (published in Tales #18)
- "Payback" by Andy Diggle (published in Tales #18)
- "Being Boba Fett" by Jason Hall (published in Tales #18)

6 BBY

- "The Princess Leia Diaries" (pages 1–7) by Jason Hall (published in Tales #11)
- "Outbid but Never Outgunned" by Beau Smith (published in Tales #7)

5 BBY

- "Routine" by Tony Isabella (published in Tales #2)
- "Young Lando Calrissian" by Gilbert Hernandez (published in Tales #20)
- "The Princess Leia Diaries" (pages 8–9) by Jason Hall (published in Tales #11)

4 BBY

- "Falling Star" by Jim Beard (published in Tales #15)

3 BBY

- "In the Beginning" by Garth Ennis (published in Tales #11)

2 BBY

- "First Impressions" by Nathan Walker (published in Tales #15)

1 BBY

- "The Princess Leia Diaries" (pages 10–12) by Jason Hall (published in Tales #11)
- "Darth Vader: Extinction" by Ron Marz (published in Tales #1-2)
- "The Hovel on Terk Street" by Tom Fassbender and Jom Pascoe (published in Tales #6)

0 ABY

- "Trooper" by Garth Ennis (published in Tales #10)
- "Walking The Path That's Given" by Shane McCarthy (published in Tales #21)
- "Lucky Stars" by Brian Augustyn (published in Tales #15)
- "Death Star Pirates" by Henry Gilroy (published in Tales #8)

1 ABY

- "Lady Luck" by Rich Handley and Darko Macan (published in Tales #3, 2000)
- "Planet of the Dead" by Steve Niles (published in Tales #17, 2003)

2 ABY

- "Ghosts of Hoth" by Rob Williams (published in Tales #17) (2003)
- A Valentine's Story: Breaking the Ice by Judd Winick and Paul Chadwick (2003)
- "The Hidden" by Sean Konot and Scott Morse (published in Tales #6) (2000)

3 ABY

- "Moment of Doubt" by Lovern Kindzierski (published in Tales #4)
- "Slippery Slope" by Scott Lobdell (published in Tales #15)
- "Thank the Maker" by Ryder Windham (published in Tales #6)
- "Hunger Pains" by Jim Campbell (published in Tales #20)

4 ABY

- "Sand Blasted" by Killian Pluckett (published in Tales #4)
- "A Day in the Life" by Brett Matthews (published in Tales #12)
- "Free Memory" by Brett Matthews (published in Tales #10)
- "Lucky" by Rob Williams (published in Tales #23)
- "Do or Do Not" by Jay Laird (published in Tales #15)

5 ABY

- "Mara Jade: A Night on the Town" by Timothy Zahn (published in Tales #1)
- "Marooned" by Lucas Marangon (published in Tales #22)
- "Three Against the Galaxy" by Rich Hedden (published in Tales #3)
- "Phantom Menaces" by Joe Casey (published in Tales #17)

6 ABY

- "Collapsing New Empires" by Jim Pascoe (published in Tales #19)

7 ABY

- "Problem Solvers" by Chris Eliopoulos (published in Tales #20)

8 ABY

- "Lando's Commandos: On Eagle's Wings" by Carlos Meglia (published in Tales #5)

11 ABY

- "The Other" by Jason Hall (published in Tales #16)
- "Tall Tales" by Scott Allie (published in Tales #11)

15 ABY

- "The Secret Tales of Luke's Hand" by Henry Gilroy (published in Tales #8)

19 ABY

- "Apocalypse Endor" by Christian Read (published in Tales #14)

25 ABY

- "Revenants" by Haden Blackman (published in Tales #18)

28 ABY

- "Equals and Opposites" by Nathan P. Butler (published in Tales #21)

40 ABY

- "The Lost Lightsaber" by Andrew Robinson & Jim Royal (published in Tales #19)

Long after Yavin

- "Storyteller" by Jason Hall (published in Tales #19)

=== Infinities (not within timeline) ===
- Infinities
  - A New Hope #1–4
  - The Empire Strikes Back #1–4
  - Return of the Jedi #1–4
- N-canon Star Wars Tales stories
  - Skippy the Jedi Droid by Peter David (published in Tales #1)
  - Stop that Jawa! by Dave Cooper (published in Tales #2)
  - A Death Star is Born by Kevin Rubio (published in Tales #4)
  - Spare Parts by Mark Evanier (published in Tales #4)
  - What They Called Me by Craig Thompson (published in Tales #5)
  - Hoth by Tony Millionaire (published in Tales #5)
  - A Hot Time in the Cold Town Tonite by Ian Edginton (published in Tales #6)
  - Junkheap Hero by Mark Evanierspli (published in Tales #6)
  - Jedi Chef by Randy Stradley (published in Tales #7)
  - Force Fiction by Kevin Rubio (published in Tales #7)
  - Captain Threepio by Ryan Kinnaird (published in Tales #8)
  - The One that Got Away by Andi Watson (published in Tales #8)
  - Resurrection by Ron Marz (published in Tales #9)
  - Lil' Maul in: Hate Leads to Lollipops by Dave McCaig (published in Tales #9)
  - The Rebel Four by Jay Stephens (published in Tales #9)
  - Skreej by Mike Kennedy (published in Tales #10)
  - A Wookiee Scorned by Jason Hall (published in Tales #10)
  - Prey by Kia Asamiya (published in Tales #11)
  - The Revenge of Tag and Bink by Kevin Rubio (published in Tales #12)
  - The Emperor's Court by Jason Hall (published in Tales #14)
  - Smuggler's Blues by Matthew and Shawn Fillbach (published in Tales #14)
  - The Sandstorm by Jason Hall (published in Tales #15)
  - Best Birthday Ever by Tod Parkhill (published in Tales #16)
  - The Long, Bad Day by Mike Denning (published in Tales #16)
  - Kessel Run by Gilbert Austin (published in Tales #16)
  - Lunch Break by Jonathan Adams (published in Tales #16)
  - The Rebel Club by Scott Kurtz (published in Tales #19)
  - Into the Great Unknown by Haden Blackman (published in Tales #19; crossover with Indiana Jones)
  - Who's Your Daddy by Jason (published in Tales #20)
  - Fred Jawa by Jason (published in Tales #20)
  - Failing Up with Jar Jar Binks by Peter Bagge (published in Tales #20)
  - Melvin Fett by James Kochalka (published in Tales #20)
  - Fett Club by Kevin Rubio (published in Tales #24)
- Tag and Bink: Revenge of the Clone Menace by Kevin Rubio
- Tag and Bink Are Dead #1–2 by Kevin Rubio
- The Return of Tag and Bink: Special Edition by Kevin Rubio
- Sergio Stomps Star Wars by Sergio Aragones
- Star Wars: Visionaries
  - Old Wounds by Aaron McBride (published in Star Wars: Visionaries and in Star Wars Legends Epic Collection: The Empire Vol. 4)
- The Star Wars #1–4 and posthumous #0 (adapted from George Lucas's 1974 screenplay The Star Wars: Rough Draft).

== Writers ==
This is a list of Star Wars comic book writers. It covers those who have written for series, one-shots, film adaptations, and comics from Star Wars Tales.

- Jonathan Adams
- Paul Alden
- Peter Alilunas
- Scott Allie
- Phil Amara
- Kevin J. Anderson
- Thomas Andrews
- Kia Asamiya
- Brian Augustyn
- Chris Avellone
- Peter Bagge
- Jeremy Barlow
- Mike Baron
- Jim Beard
- Scott Beatty
- Haden Blackman
- Nathan P. Butler
- Joe Casey
- C.B. Cebulski
- Paul Chadwick
- Chris Claremont
- Dave Cooper
- Brian Daley
- Peter David
- Mike Denning
- William C. Dietz
- Andy Diggle
- Chuck Dixon
- Jan Duursema
- Ian Edginton
- Chris Eliopoulos
- Garth Ennis
- Paul Ens
- Mark Evanierspli
- Tom Fassbender
- Matthew Fillbach
- Shawn Fillbach
- Alan Dean Foster
- Alexander Freed
- Milton Freewater Jr.
- Warren J. Fu
- Adam Gallardo
- Rick Geary
- Henry Gilroy
- Archie Goodwin
- Jason Hall
- Rich Handley
- Bob Harris
- Mick Harrison
- Welles Hartley
- Rich Hedden
- Gilbert Hernandez
- Pablo Hidalgo
- Shin-ichi Hiromoto
- Tony Isabella
- Matt Jacobs
- Bruce Jones
- Ryan Kaufman
- Mike Kennedy
- Ryan Kinnaird
- Sean Konot
- Jim Krueger
- Toshiki Kudo
- Scott Kurtz
- Jay Laird
- Justin Lambros
- Miles Lane
- Paul Lee
- Sang Jun Lee
- Ken Lizzi
- Darko Macan
- David Manak
- Andy Mangels
- Russ Manning
- Lucas Marangon
- Ron Marz
- Brett Matthews
- Aaron McBride
- Shane McCarthy
- Carlos Meglia
- Steven Melching
- John Jackson Miller
- Pat Mills
- Alan Moore
- Steve Moore
- Scott Morse
- Dean Motter
- Tim Mucci
- Michael Murnane
- Fabian Nicieza
- Steve Niles
- Phill Norwood
- John Ostrander
- Steve Parkhouse
- Jim Pascoe
- Steve Perry
- Doug Petrie
- Killian Pluckett
- Christian Read
- Mike Richardson
- Andrew Robinson
- Jim Royal
- Kevin Rubio
- Stan Sakai
- Mark Schultz
- Louise Simonson
- Beau Smith
- Michael A. Stackpole
- Jay Stephens
- Randy Stradley
- Jan Strnad
- Tom Taylor
- Darek Thompson
- Dan Thorsland
- Erik Tiemens
- Timothy Truman
- Tom Veitch
- John Wagner
- Chris Warner
- Nathan Walker
- Andi Watson
- Rob Williams
- Ryder Windham
- Judd Winick
- Jim Woodring
- Timothy Zahn

== Star Wars manga ==
All are Legends adaptations of the films or Canon adaptations of canonical TV shows/novels.

=== Film ===
Produced before Disney, and as a result they take place in the Legends continuity.

- Episode I: The Phantom Menace (manga) by Kia Asamiya
- Episode IV: A New Hope (manga) by Hisao Tamaki
- Episode V: The Empire Strikes Back (manga) by Toshiki Kudo
- Episode VI: Return of the Jedi (manga) by Shin-ichi Hiromoto

==== Star Wars: Story Before the Force Awakens (2015) ====
The comic series listed here is licensed by Disney but was not released by Marvel or Disney-Lucasfilm Press. Its canonical status is disputed due to some minor changes made to the story due to cultural interpretation but all are film adaptations.

Star Wars: Story Before the Force Awakens is a webcomic adaptation of the original trilogy by Korean artist and writer Hong Jac-ga. The strips were translated to English and have been made available worldwide on the platform Webtoon. The Story Before the Force Awakens spans the "Rise of the Empire Era" and the "Rebellion Era". The English translations have since been removed and there is no information if they will ever be re-released.

- An Old Friend (Issue #1) (12 BBY–6 BBY)
- Meeting the Droids (Issue #2) (6 BBY–0 BBY)
- Beginning of an Adventure (Issue #3) (0 BBY)
- Only Hope (Issue #4) (0 BBY)
- Escape (Issue #5) (0 BBY)
- Death Star (Issue #6) (0 BBY)
- Rescue (Issue #7) (0 BBY)
- Darth Vader (Issue #8) (0 BBY)
- Vanishing into the Force (Issue #9) (0 BBY)
- The Little Spark (Issue #10) (0 BBY)
- X-Wing (Issue #11) (0 BBY)
- One Shot (Issue #12) (0 BBY)
- Awakening of the Force (Issue #13) (0 BBY)
- Miracle of Yavin (Issue #14) (0 BBY)
- Suffering (Issue #15) (3 ABY)
- Strike (Issue #16) (3 ABY)
- Retreat (Issue #17) (3 ABY)
- Dagobah (Issue #18) (3 ABY)
- Master Yoda (Issue #19) (3 ABY)
- Training (Issue #20) (3 ABY)
- Dark Side of Force (Issue #21) (3 ABY)
- Calling (Issue #22) (3 ABY)
- Trap (Issue #23) (3 ABY)
- Unprepared Duel (Issue #24) (3 ABY)
- The Cruel Truth (Issue #25) (3 ABY)
- Choice (Issue #26) (3 ABY)
- Determination (Issue #27) (3 ABY)
- Jabba's Palace (Issue #28) (4 ABY)
- Pit of Carkoon (Issue #29) (4 ABY)
- Lightsaber (Issue #30) (4 ABY)
- Rescue (Issue #31) (4 ABY)
- Secret of Birth (Issue #32) (4 ABY)
- Forest Moon (Issue #33) (4 ABY)
- Protectors of the Forest (Issue #34) (4 ABY)
- Surrender (Issue #35) (4 ABY)
- The Emperor (Issue #36) (4 ABY)
- Rage (Issue #37) (4 ABY)
- Light vs. Dark (Issue #38) (4 ABY)
- Epiphany (Issue #39) (4 ABY)
- The End (Issue #40) (4 ABY)

=== Television ===
The comic series listed here is licensed by Disney but was not released by Marvel or Disney-Lucasfilm Press. Its canonical status is disputed due to some minor changes made to the story due to cultural interpretation but adapts a canonical TV show.

==== Star Wars Rebels webcomic ====
Star Wars Rebels is an ongoing webcomic by Japanese artist Akira Aoki. It adapts the first season of the TV show Star Wars Rebels, consists of 28 chapters, and despite being made for a Japanese audience, it was partially translated into English in November 2020.

=== Novel ===
The comics listed here are licensed by Disney but were not released by Marvel or Disney-Lucasfilm Press. Their canonical status is disputed due to some minor changes made to the story due to cultural interpretation, but all adapt canonical novels.

==== Star Wars: Lost Stars (2017) ====
Star Wars: Lost Stars is a webcomic adaptation of the Claudia Gray novel of the same name by Japanese artist and writer Komiyama Yuusaku. The strips debuted May 4, 2017, on the Japanese version of WEBTOON. The first trade paperback was released in December 2017, with an English translation released in May 2018. The events of Lost Stars span the Rise of the Empire Era, the Rebellion Era, and the New Republic Era, from approximately 11 years before Episode IV: A New Hope to 1 year after Episode VI: Return of the Jedi.

- Volume 1 (December 2017)
  - Prologue #1 (May 2017)
  - Prologue #2 (May 2017)
  - Issue #1 (June 2017)
  - Artwork #1 (June 2017)
  - Issue #2 (July 2017)
  - Issue #3 (July 2017)
  - Issue #4 (August 2017)
  - Issue #5 (August 2017)
  - Issue #6 (September 2017)
  - Issue #7 (September 2017)
  - Issue #8 (October 2017)
  - Issue #9 (October 2017)
  - Issue #10 (November 2017)
  - Issue #11 (November 2017)
- Volume 2 (April 2019)
  - Issue #12 (December 2017)
  - Artwork #2 (December 2017)
  - Issue #13 (January 2018)
  - Issue #14 (January 2018)
  - Issue #15 (February 2018)
  - Issue #16 (February 2018)
  - Issue #17 (March 2018)
  - Issue #18 (March 2018)
  - Issue #19 (April 2018)
  - Issue #20 (May 2018)
  - Issue #21 (May 2018)
  - Issue #22 (June 2018)
  - Issue #23 (July 2018)
- Volume 3 (April 2020)
  - Issue #24 (July 2018)
  - Issue #25 (August 2018)
  - Issue #26 (September 2018)
  - Issue #27 (September 2018)
  - Issue #28 (October 2018)
  - Issue #29 (November 2018)
  - Issue #30 (November 2018)
  - Issue #31 (December 2018)
  - Issue #32 (December 2018)
  - Issue #33 (January 2019)
  - Issue #34 (February 2019)
  - Issue #35 (March 2019)
  - Issue #36 (March 2019)
- Uncollected
  - Bonus (April 2019)

==== Leia Organa: Ordeal of the Princess (2018) ====
Leia Organa: Ordeal of the Princess is a webcomic adaptation of the Claudia Gray novel of the same name by Japanese artist Haruichi. The strips began releasing in May 2019 on WEBTOON, however, the manga was put on hold after the 11th issue because the artist had some health issues. The manga takes place approximately three years before Episode IV: A New Hope.

==== Star Wars: Lords of the Sith and Star Wars: Heir to the Jedi (2018) ====
Star Wars: Lords of the Sith and Star Wars: Heir to the Jedi were planned Japanese manga adaptations of the novels by the same names. These manga were eventually canceled, and replaced with a Star Wars Rebels webcomic. An excerpt from the Lords of the Sith manga was included in the English paperback of the Rebels webcomic.

==== The Legends of Luke Skywalker-The Manga (2020) ====
The Legends of Luke Skywalker-The Manga is a manga adaptation of the novel The Legends of Luke Skywalker by Ken Liu. The manga is split up into four parts: "The Starship Graveyard", "I, Droid", "The Tale of Lugubrious Mote", and "Big Inside", all of which are drawn by different artists.

==== Star Wars: Guardians of the Whills: The Manga (2021) ====
Guardians of the Whills: The Manga is a manga adaptation of the novel Guardians of the Whills by Greg Rucka. It is written by Jon Tsuei and published by Viz Media.

=== Original manga stories ===
The comic listed here will be licensed by Disney, but will not be released by Marvel or Disney-Lucasfilm Press. As it will not be an adaptation, it can be assumed that it will be Canon.

==== Star Wars: The High Republic: The Edge of Balance (2021) ====
The High Republic: The Edge of Balance is an original manga in the High Republic multimedia project. It is written by Shima Shinya and Justina Ireland, and is published by Viz Media.

== See also ==
- List of Star Wars books
