= The Empire Strikes Back (disambiguation) =

The Empire Strikes Back is a 1980 film in the Star Wars saga. It may also refer to:

== Star Wars media ==
- The Empire Strikes Back (novel), the 1980 novelization of the film, written by Donald F. Glut
- The Empire Strikes Back (soundtrack), the soundtrack to the film
- The Empire Strikes Back (comic), the comic adaptation of the film, first published in Marvel Comics Super Special #16 (Spring 1980)
- The Empire Strikes Back, a 1983 radio adaptation of the film
- Choose Your Own Star Wars Adventure: The Empire Strikes Back, a 1998 gamebook by Christopher Golden
- Star Wars Manga: The Empire Strikes Back, a 1998 manga adaptation of the film, illustrated by Toshiki Kudo and published by MediaWorks
- Star Wars Infinities: The Empire Strikes Back, a 2003 four-part story arc in the Star Wars Infinities comic book limited series
- Star Wars: Episode V – The Empire Strikes Back, a 2004 junior novelization of the film by Ryder Windham
- William Shakespeare's The Empire Striketh Back: Star Wars Part the Fifth, a 2014 non-canon book by Ian Doescher

== Video games ==
- Star Wars: The Empire Strikes Back (1982 video game), an Atari 2600 game
- Star Wars: The Empire Strikes Back (1985 video game), an arcade game
- Star Wars: The Empire Strikes Back (1992 video game), a 1992 side-scrolling action game for the Nintendo Entertainment System and Game Boy
- Super Star Wars: The Empire Strikes Back, a 1993 side-scrolling action game for the Super NES
- The Empire Strikes Back (pinball), a pinball machine released in 1980 by Hankin

== Other media ==
=== General ===
- SP FX: The Empire Strikes Back, a 1980 television documentary
- The Empire Strikes Back: The Adventures of Luke Skywalker, a 1980 album published by RSO Records, presenting an abridged version of the film, adapted from the soundtrack and narrated by Malachi Throne
- The Empire Strikes Back (Country Teasers album), 2006
- The Falklands War, as popularly dubbed by American media outlets

=== Music ===
- Music from The Empire Strikes Back, a 1980 album by Boris Midney
- Meco Plays Music from The Empire Strikes Back, a 1980 album by Meco
- The Empire Strikes Back: Symphonic Suite from the Original Motion Picture Score, a 1980 Varèse Sarabande soundtrack album featuring music by John Williams, conducted by Charles Gerhardt with the National Philharmonic Orchestra

=== Literature ===
- Once Upon a Galaxy: The Journal of the Making of The Empire Strikes Back, a 1980 book by Alan Arnold
- The Art of The Empire Strikes Back, a 1980 book edited by Deborah Call with text by Vic Bulluck and Valerie Hoffman
- The Empire Strikes Back: Race and Racism in 70s Britain, a 1982 book co-authored by Paul Gilroy
- "The Empire Strikes Back: A Posttranssexual Manifesto", a 1987 essay by American academic theorist Sandy Stone
- The Making of The Empire Strikes Back, a 2010 book by J. W. Rinzler relating the production of the film

=== Television episodes ===
- "And the Empire Strikes Back", Law & Order: Special Victims Unit season 23, episode 1 (2021)
- "The Empire Strikes Back", Cunk on Britain episode 2 (2018)
- "The Empire Strikes Back", My Big Fat Greek Life episode 2 (2003)
- "The Empire Strikes Back", The Lost Pirate Kingdom episode 4 (2021)
- "The Empire Strikes Back", Treasures of Ancient Rome episode 3 (2012)
- "The Empires Strike Back", Bering Sea Gold season 15, episode 1 (2022)

== See also ==
- "The Eggpire Strikes Back", The Adventures of Jimmy Neutron, Boy Genius season 1, episode 15 (2003)
- Lego Star Wars: The Empire Strikes Out, a 2012 animated television special, the second special based on the Lego Star Wars theme
- The Umpire Strikes Back, a 1982 book by Ron Luciano and David Fisher
- The Vampire Strikes Back (disambiguation)
