= John O'Carroll =

British painter

- Born: John Patrick O'Carroll; 1958 (age 67–68); Cornwall, England
- Education: Cornwall College of Art
- Known for: Archaeological illustration; Painting; Sculpture
- Patrons: Holly Solomon (USA); Mondrain Foundation (Netherlands)
- Website: johnocarroll.co.uk

John Patrick O'Carroll (born 1958 in Cornwall, England) is a British archaeological illustrator, painter, and sculptor.

John O'Carroll studied at the Cornwall College of Art. He worked as an archaeological illustrator at the Dakhla Oasis in the Western Desert of Egypt for 23 years. This experience influenced his subsequent work as an artist. He has collected pigments in the desert to create his own paints. He has also developed an art technique that combines natural pigment layers with wax layers. O'Carroll has worked and exhibited in Mexico, The Netherlands, and the United States.

In 2005, O'Carroll returned to Cornwall, dividing his time between Egypt and the United Kingdom. He is a trustee on the Dakhleh Oasis Project in Egypt. O'Carroll is a resident artist at the Circle Contemporary gallery in Hawksfield, located between Padstow and Wadebridge in north Cornwall. He has also been represented by the Roger Katwijk Gallery in Amsterdam, The Netherlands. O'Carroll's work combines modern and natural materials, referencing ancient worlds.

O'Carroll's works are held in collections including the Holly Solomon Collection (United States) and by the British Embassy Mondrain Foundation (The Netherlands). His work is in corporate collections, including Accenture, AkzoNobel, AMC, Loyens & Loeff, and VUmc. In 2012, the National Museum of Antiquities in Leiden (The Netherland) included O'Carroll in the "Colours Of Oasis" exhibition. In 2015, his work featured at the Netherlands-Flemish Institute in Cairo (Egypt). In 2016, O'Carroll participated in the "Antropocine" exhibition at the Eden Project in Cornwall. He has been a consultant for the television documentary series Treasures of Ancient Egypt (2014, BBC Four), as well as making an appearance. He also appeared on Treasures of Ancient Rome (2012, BBC Four) and was credited on Ancient Worlds (2010, BBC).
