= ROTJ =

ROTJ may refer to:

- Return of the Jedi, a 1983 Star Wars film
- Return of the Jedi (disambiguation)
- Return of the Joker (disambiguation)
