= Return of the Jedi (disambiguation) =

Return of the Jedi is a film in the Star Wars saga. It may also refer to:

== General ==
- Return of the Jedi (novel), the 1983 novelization of the film, written by James Kahn
- Return of the Jedi (soundtrack), the soundtrack to the film
- Return of the Jedi (comic), a comic adaptation of the film, published as a four-issue limited series by Marvel Comics
- Return of the Jedi: The Storybook Based on the Movie, a 1983 children's book adaptation by Joan D. Vinge
- Return of the Jedi, a radio adaptation of the film, produced in 1996
- Choose Your Own Star Wars Adventure: Return of the Jedi, a 1998 gamebook in the Choose Your Own Adventure series by Christopher Golden
- Star Wars Manga: Return of the Jedi, a 1999 manga adaptation of the film, illustrated by Shin-ichi Hiromoto and published by MediaWorks
- Star Wars Infinities: Return of the Jedi, a 2004 four-part story arc in the Star Wars Infinities comic book series
- Star Wars: Episode VI – Return of the Jedi, a 2004 junior novelization of the film by Ryder Windham
- William Shakespeare's The Jedi Doth Return: Star Wars Part the Sixth, a 2014 non-canon book by Ian Doescher

== Video games ==
- Return of the Jedi: Death Star Battle, a 1983 shoot 'em up video game
- Star Wars: Return of the Jedi (video game)
- Star Wars: Return of the Jedi: Ewok Adventure, a cancelled 1983 shoot 'em up video game
- Super Star Wars: Return of the Jedi, a 1994 side-scrolling action game for the Super NES

== Other media ==
- Classic Creatures: Return of the Jedi, a 1983 television documentary
- The Art of Return of the Jedi, a 1983 book edited by George Lucas and Lawrence Kasdan
- The Making of Star Wars: Return of the Jedi, a 1983 book by John Phillip Peecher
- The Story of Star Wars: Return of the Jedi, a 1983 album published by Buena Vista Records, presenting an abridged version of the film, adapted from the soundtrack and narrated by Chuck Riley
- The Making of Return of the Jedi: The Definitive Story Behind the Film, a 2013 book by J. W. Rinzler relating the production of the film

=== Television episodes ===
- "Star Wars: Return of the Jedi", The Keith & Paddy Picture Show series 1, episode 3 (2017)
- "Return of the Return of the Jedi", Lego Star Wars: The Freemaker Adventures season 2, episode 13 (2017)

== See also ==
- Blue Harvest (disambiguation), referring to the ruse working title of the film
- Star Wars: Episode III – Revenge of the Sith, the third Star Wars prequel film those title is a reference to Revenge of the Jedi, the original working title of the film
- "Star Mort Rickturn of the Jerri", a 2020 episode of Rick and Morty
