= General Skywalker =

General Skywalker may refer to:

- Anakin Skywalker
- Luke Skywalker
- Star Wars Empire: "General" Skywalker
