= Chaillevois =

- Commune
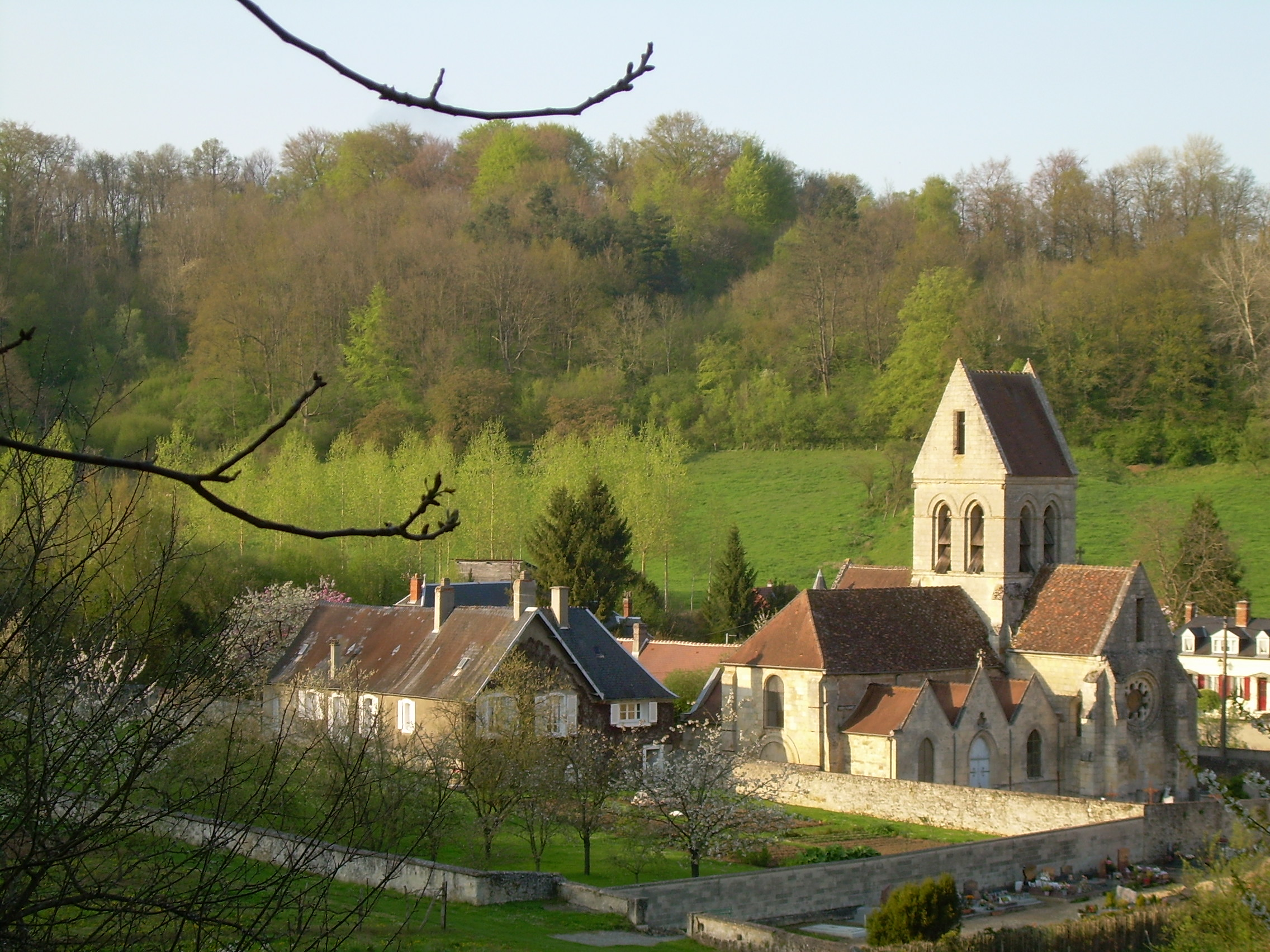
- The village of Chaillevois
- Location of Chaillevois
- Location within France Location within Hauts-de-France
- Coordinates: 49°30′48″N 3°31′33″E
- Country: France
- Region: Hauts-de-France
- Department: Aisne
- Arrondissement: Laon
- Canton: Laon-1
- Intercommunality: Picardie des Châteaux

Government
  - Mayor (2026–32): Philippe Mignot
- Area^{1}: 2.17 km^{2} (0.84 sq mi)
- Elevation: 75 m (246 ft)
- Highest elevation: 169 m (554 ft)
- Lowest elevation: 57 m (187 ft)
- Population (2023): 201
  - Density: 92.6/km^{2} (240/sq mi)
- Time zone: UTC+01:00 (CET)
  - Summer (DST): UTC+02:00 (CEST)
- INSEE/Postal code: 02155 /02000
- ^{1} French Land Register data, which excludes lakes, ponds, glaciers > 1 km^{2} (0.386 sq mi or 247 acres) and river estuaries.

Chaillevois (French pronunciation: [ʃajvwa]) is a commune in the Aisne department in Hauts-de-France in northern France.

== Geography ==
The river Ailette forms part of the commune's southern border.

The name of this village seems derive from an old path that probably happened in this place, callis via, or royal road. In 1760, most of the villagers made their living from forestry, agriculture or viticulture. The village once belonged to the bishops of Aaon, who lost possession in the French Revolution. It was also the home town of Jean-Baptiste Tholmé, a general in the time of the Revolution.

== Population ==
Historical population
Year	Pop.	±% p.a.
1968	149	—
1975	160	+1.02%
1982	155	−0.45%
1990	174	+1.46%
1999	175	+0.06%
2007	191	+1.10%
2012	183	−0.85%
2017	174	−1.00%
2023	201	+2.43%
Source: INSEE

== See also ==
- Communes of the Aisne department
