= Blue Harvest (disambiguation) =

Blue Harvest may refer to:

== Star Wars ==
- The ruse working title of the third original Star Wars film Return of the Jedi (1983)
- Blue Harvest, the fourth story arc of the comic book limited series Star Wars: Dark Times

== Television ==
- "Blue Harvest" (Ewoks), Ewoks episode
- "Blue Harvest", Family Guy episode

== See also ==
- Red Harvest (disambiguation)
