= Star Wars: Jedi =

Series of comics

The Jedi series of comics was written by John Ostrander and Jeremy Barlow, and was published by Dark Horse Comics from 20 August 2003 to 21 July 2004 as a series of one-shots chronicling the actions of five Jedi during the Clone Wars.

== Jedi: Mace Windu ==
Jedi: Mace Windu

Publication information
- Subject: Star Wars
- Genre: Science fiction
- Release date(s): 26 February 2003
- Country: United States
- Language: English
- No. of pages: 48

Expanded Universe
- Galactic Year: 22 BBY
- Canon: C

Creative team
- Script writer: John Ostrander
- Cover artist(s): Jan Duursema
- Penciller(s): Jan Duursema
- Inker(s): Dan Parsons
- Colorist(s): Joe Wayne
- Letterer(s): Digital Chameleon

=== Synopsis ===
Mace Windu is a male human from the planet Haruun Kal. Mace Windu was a senior member of the Jedi High Council since the age of 28, second only in authority to Yoda. He served as leader of the clone armies as a peace-keeper, known for his fierce dedication, rigorous example, and steady discipline. He is very knowledgeable of Jedi philosophy and history. A good and faithful friend of Yoda. He spent most of his time at the Jedi temple in Coruscant. It is notable that Mace Windu never trusted Anakin Skywalker. He saw Anakin's potential, but also realized his danger something that Yoda was not as able to sense. Mace Windu is portrayed in the Star Wars films by Samuel L. Jackson in Episodes I, II, and III.

=== Dramatis personae ===
- Asajj Ventress
- Cei Vookto
- Dama Montalvo
- Count Dooku
- Ki-Adi-Mundi
- K'Kruhk
- Ky Narec
- Mace Windu
- Mira
- Quinlan Vos
- Rhad Tarn
- Sian Jeisel
- Sora Bulq
- Tholme
- Yoda

== Jedi: Shaak Ti ==
Jedi: Shaak Ti

Publication information
- Subject: Star Wars
- Genre: Science fiction
- Release date(s): 14 May 2003
- Country: United States
- Language: English
- No. of pages: 48

Expanded Universe
- Galactic Year: 21 BBY
- Canon: C

Creative team
- Script writer: John Ostrander
- Cover artist(s): Jan Duursema
- Penciller(s): Jan Duursema
- Inker(s): Dan Parsons
- Colorist(s): Joe Wayne
- Letterer(s): Digital Chameleon

=== Synopsis ===
Shaak Ti is a female Togruta, a colorful and exotic alien species, from the planet Shili. Shaak Ti is a member of the Jedi High Council and a Jedi General during the Clone Wars. She is a very well respected warrior, known for slaying Artel Darc and surviving an encounter with General Grievous. Shaak Ti is portrayed in the Star Wars films by Orli Shoshan in Episodes II & III.

=== Dramatis personae ===
- Agen Kolar
- Count Dooku
- Fe Sun (Mentioned only)
- Lyshaa
- Plo Koon
- Quinlan Vos
- Ryyk
- Sagoro Autem
- Shaak Ti
- Shogar Tok
- Shon Kon Ray

== Jedi: Aayla Secura ==
Jedi: Aayla Secura

Publication information
- Subject: Star Wars
- Genre: Science fiction
- Release date(s): 20 August 2003
- Country: United States
- Language: English
- No. of pages: 48

Expanded Universe
- Galactic Year: 21 BBY
- Canon: C

Creative team
- Script writer: John Ostrander
- Cover artist(s): Jan Duursema
- Penciller(s): Jan Duursema
- Inker(s): Dan Parsons
- Colorist(s): Brad Anderson
- Letterer(s): Sno Cone Studios

=== Synopsis ===
Aayla Secura was first brought into the Star Wars saga by Dark Horse Comics. George Lucas took a liking to the character and decided to use her. Aayla Secura is a female Twi'lek, a bluish alien species, from the planet Ryloth. Aayla is very skilled in lightsaber combat. She was a Jedi Knight and Clone Wars General. Aayla caved to the Dark Side for a period when she was involved with Volfe Karkko. She died in the tragedy of Order 66 on Felucia. Aayla Secura is portrayed in the Star Wars films by Amy Allen in Episodes II & III.

=== Dramatis personae ===
- Aayla Secura
- An'ya Kuro ("Dark Woman")
- Aurra Sing
- Aven'sai'Ulrahk
- Elsah'sai'Moro
- Fenn Booda
- Kit Fisto
- Quinlan Vos
- Tholme
- T'ra Saa
- Vien'sai'Malloc
- Xiaan Amersu

== Jedi: Count Dooku ==
Jedi: Count Dooku

Publication information
- Subject: Star Wars
- Genre: Science fiction
- Release date(s): 3 December 2003
- Country: United States
- Language: English
- No. of pages: 48

Expanded Universe
- Galactic Year: 21 BBY
- Canon: C

Creative team
- Script writer: John Ostrander
- Cover artist(s): Jan Duursema; Brad Anderson
- Penciller(s): Jan Duursema
- Inker(s): Dan Parsons
- Colorist(s): Brad Anderson
- Letterer(s): Michael David Thomas

=== Synopsis ===
Dooku, also known as Darth Tyranus or Count Dooku, is a male Human from the planet Serenno. Padawan of Yoda and Master of Qui-Gon Jinn. Dooku was a master swordsman known throughout the galaxy. He served as a combat instructor in the Jedi Temple. It is said that only Mace Windu and Yoda are considered on equal terms. Dooku was a Jedi Master turned Sith Lord. He was brought to the dark side by Darth Sidious replacing Darth Maul. Dooku is portrayed in the Star Wars films by Christopher Lee in Episodes II & III.

=== Dramatis personae ===
- Count Dooku
- Jeisel
- Kadrian Sey
- Kai Justiss
- Khaleen Hentz
- Mace Windu
- Quinlan Vos
- Shylar
- Sora Bulq
- Spurlick
- Suribran Tu
- Tholme
- Tinté Vos
- Tol Skorr
- Tsui Choi
- Zurros

== Jedi: Yoda ==
Jedi: Yoda

Publication information
- Subject: Star Wars
- Genre: Science fiction
- Release date(s): 21 July 2003
- Country: United States
- Language: English
- No. of pages: 48

Expanded Universe
- Galactic Year: 21 BBY
- Canon: C

Creative team
- Script writer: Jeremy Barlow
- Cover artist(s): Hoon
- Artist(s): Hoon
- Letterer(s): Michael David Thomas

=== Synopsis ===
Yoda is of an unknown species from an unknown planet. He stands just 66 cm tall, yet he is the most renowned and powerful Jedi Master in all galactic history. Known for his mastery of the force, lightsaber combat skills, and his unparalleled wisdom. He is a member of the Jedi High Council reigning Grand Master of the Jedi Order. Some of Yoda's biggest mistakes in judgment were Supreme Chancellor Palpatine (Dark Lord of The Sith, Darth Sidious) and Anakin Skywalker (Lord Darth Vader). Yoda's voice is portrayed in the Star Wars films by Frank Oz in Episodes I, II, III, V, & VI

=== Dramatis personae ===
- Alaric
- Cal
- Clutch
- CR57
- Dekluun
- Mace Windu
- Mas Amedda
- Moje
- Navi
- Obi-Wan Kenobi
- Oppo Rancisis
- Palpatine
- Pix
- Tyffix
- Tyr
- Yoda
