= Star Wars: Rebellion (comics) =

2006 Star Wars comic series

My Brother, My Enemy
- Cover of the first issue

Publication information
- Publishing company: Dark Horse Comics
- Subject: Star Wars
- Genre: Science fiction
- Release date(s): 12 April 2006: 6 December 2006
- Country: United States
- Language: English
- No. of pages: 32 each

Expanded Universe
- Era: Rebellion
- Series: Rebellion
- Galactic Year: 0 ABY
- Canon: C
- Preceded by: Boba Fett: Overkill
- Followed by: Lady Luck

Creative team
- Script writer: Rob Williams
- Cover artist(s): Brandon Badeaux
- Artist(s): Michel Lacombe
- Colorist(s): Wil Glass
- Letterer(s): Michael Heisler
- Designer(s): Josh Elliott
- Editor(s): Jeremy Barlow
- Assistant editor(s): Dave Marshall
- Publisher(s): Mike Richardson

Star Wars: Rebellion is a Star Wars comic written by Rob Williams and published by Dark Horse Comics. The first issue was published on April 12, 2006. The story is set in the Star Wars galaxy nine months after the Battle of Yavin depicted in the original Star Wars film, and continues some plot threads begun in Star Wars: Empire.

== Story arcs ==
=== My Brother, My Enemy ===
Several long running plot-lines come together. Angered and confused after being injured by Luke Skywalker, Imperial Officer Janek Sunber decides to go to Darth Vader himself. He is welcome as he has much to tell about Skywalker's life on Tatooine.

Jorin Sol is on a Rebellion flagship, under intense questioning. Some believe that he is some sort of trap, sent by the Imperials to damage the Rebellion.

Though not many believe this, it is true. Jorin Sol 'goes off'. He nearly kills Deena Shan, but she escapes with her life. Sunber decides to make his move also. Sol ends up killing two officers, Princess Leia is badly injured and the Rebel's fleet becomes known to the Imperials. Sunber confronts Luke.

A battle ensues, with losses on both sides. Most of the Rebel fleet escapes, except for the flagship. Sunber and Sol are apparently lost in fiery debris but not before Sol recovers his mind enough to program in a seemingly random course for the flagship. It escapes the Imperials, one of many rebel ships now scattered.

Luke Skywalker manages to detect the launch of an escape pod, which indicates the possibility of Sol or Sunber surviving. Leia is shown spending time healing. The flagship is shown being repaired.

== Issues ==
- Rebellion #1: My Brother, My Enemy, Part 1
- Rebellion #2: My Brother, My Enemy, Part 2
- Rebellion #3: My Brother, My Enemy, Part 3
- Rebellion #4: My Brother, My Enemy, Part 4
- Rebellion #5: My Brother, My Enemy, Part 5
- Rebellion #6: The Ahakista Gambit, Part 1
- Rebellion #7: The Ahakista Gambit, Part 2 (June 20_{,} 2007)
- Rebellion #8: The Ahakista Gambit, Part 3 (July 11, 2007)
- Rebellion #9: The Ahakista Gambit, Part 4 (August 8, 2007)
- Rebellion #10: The Ahakista Gambit, Part 5 (September 2007)

== Dramatis personae ==
- Ackbar
- Beru Lars (Mentioned only)
- Biggs Darklighter (Flashback)
- CT-1707
- Darth Vader
- Deela (Mentioned only)
- Deena Shan
- Drybal
- Janek Sunber
- Jorin Sol
- Kale Roshuir
- Kendal Ozzel
- Leia Organa
- Luke Skywalker
- Owen Lars (Flashback)
- Palpatine (Flashback)
- R2-D2
- Raze
- Tepar (Mentioned only)
- Tungo Li
- Wedge Antilles
- Wyl Tarson
- Zuud
