= Jean-Baptiste Tholmé =

Jean-Baptiste Tholmé, (11 May 1753, Rocroi – 8 September 1805), was a general of brigade in the French Revolutionary Wars and Napoleonic Wars. He was named chief of staff of the Army of the Moselle (3 August 1794). During the Rhine Campaign of 1796, he led the main body of Ferino's division over the passage of the Lech and at the Battle of Friedberg. He was born in Rocroy, in the village of Chaillevois, near Laon, diocese of Soissons. He attended the School in Mezieres in 1768, where he studied engineering and geography, and was employed as an engineer in the corps of infantry. In 1780, he was a colonel of Infantry. He was an officer of the Legion of honor. He served in Switzerland, in the campaign in the Grisons (1800–1802). He was commandant of the army in Bologne in 1803.
