= Red Harvest (disambiguation) =

Red Harvest is a 1929 detective novel by Dashiell Hammett.

Red Harvest may also refer to:

- Red Harvest (band), a Norwegian industrial metal band
- Red Harvest (Bloodsimple album), 2007
- Red Harvest (Altar album), 2001
- Red Harvest (play), a 1937 Broadway play by Walter Charles Roberts
