= Return of the Joker =

Return of the Joker may refer to:

- Batman: Return of the Joker, a 1991 platform video game
- Batman Beyond: Return of the Joker, a 2000 American direct-to-video animated film
