= Alastair Sooke =

English art critic, journalist and broadcaster

- Born: 1981 (age 44–45)
- Education: Christ Church, Oxford; Courtauld Institute of Art (MA)
- Occupations: Journalist, broadcaster
- Awards: Queen's Scholar

Alastair Sooke (/suːk/; born 1981) is an English art critic, journalist and broadcaster, most notable for reporting and commenting on art for the British media and writing and presenting documentaries on art and art history for BBC television and radio. His BBC documentaries include Modern Masters for BBC One and three three-part series, Treasures of Ancient Rome, Treasures of Ancient Egypt, and Treasures of Ancient Greece, for BBC Four.

Sooke is chief art critic at The Daily Telegraph, writing on art and art history, including on the Turner Prize and contemporary art. He is also a regular presenter on The Culture Show.

== Biography ==
Sooke was born in west London in October 1981 and educated at Westminster School, an independent boarding school in Central London, where he was a Queen's Scholar. At the age of fourteen Sooke starred as Kay Harker in a BBC Radio 4 adaptation of John Masefield's children's fantasy novel, The Box of Delights. Sooke won a Westminster Scholarship to Christ Church, Oxford, where he read English language and literature and won the university's Charles Oldham Shakespeare Prize. After graduating with a First, he studied for an M.A. at the Courtauld Institute of Art in London.

Sooke lives in London with his wife and three children.

Sooke is known as a writer and presenter of documentaries on art and art history for BBC television and radio. His BBC documentaries include Modern Masters (for BBC One), exploring four artists who shaped modern art; the tripartite series Treasures of Ancient Rome in 2012, Treasures of Ancient Egypt in 2014, and Treasures of Ancient Greece in 2015, all for BBC Four, and How the Devil Got His Horns, a history of depictions of the Devil in Western art (also for BBC Four).

Sooke also serves as an art critic, and writes periodical-length pieces on art theory, history and criticism, as well as penning investigative pieces that have appeared in journals, and newspapers. These include The Telegraph, where he is a deputy art critic after joining the paper as a trainee journalist in 2003. He appears regularly on BBC2's The Culture Show. In addition, Sooke has written books on pop art, Henri Matisse and Roy Lichtenstein.

== Television ==
Year	Work	Channel
2010	Modern Masters	BBC One
2011	Romancing the Stone: The Golden Ages of British Sculpture	BBC Four
2011	The Perfect Suit	BBC Four
2011	The Summer Exhibition: BBC Arts at the Royal Academy	BBC Two
2011	The World's Most Expensive Paintings	BBC One
2012	How the Devil Got His Horns: A Diabolical Tale	BBC Four
2012	Unfinished Masterpieces	BBC Two
2012	The Summer Exhibition: BBC Arts at the Royal Academy	BBC Two
2012	Treasures of Ancient Rome	BBC Four
2013	Pride and Prejudice: Having a Ball	BBC Two
2013	The Summer Exhibition: BBC Arts at the Royal Academy	BBC Two
2013	Whaam! Roy Lichtenstein at Tate Modern	BBC Four
2014	Constable: A Country Rebel	BBC Four
2014	Pop Go the Women: The Other Story of Pop Art	BBC Two
2014	The Summer Exhibition: BBC Arts at the Royal Academy	BBC Two
2014	The World’s Most Expensive Stolen Paintings	BBC Two
2014	Treasures of Ancient Egypt	BBC Four
2015	Soup Cans and Superstars: How Pop Art Changed the World	BBC Four
2015	Treasures of Ancient Greece	BBC Four
2016	Lichtenstein: A Retrospective	BBC Two
2016	Robert Rauschenberg: Pop Art Pioneer	
2017	An Art Lovers' Guide	BBC Two
2017	Trump on Culture: Brave New World	BBC Two
2018	An Art Lover's Guide	BBC Two
2020	Museums in Quarantine: Warhol	BBC Four

== Bibliography ==
- Postcards from Vegas (2011) ISBN 9780955819513
- Roy Lichtenstein: How Modern Art was Saved by Donald Duck (2013) ISBN 9780241965061
- Henri Matisse: A Second Life (2014) ISBN 9780241969090
- Pop Art: A Colourful History (2015) ISBN 9780241973073
