= Treasures of Ancient Rome =

- Title card of the documentary; Sooke standing in front of the Pantheon, Rome
- Genre: Documentary
- Written by: Alastair Sooke
- Directed by: Tim Dunn
- Presented by: Alastair Sooke
- Theme music composer: John Dutton
- Country of origin: United Kingdom
- Original language: English
- No. of episodes: 3

Production
- Executive producer: Jonty Claypole
- Camera setup: Mark Hammond
- Running time: 180 minutes
- Production company: BBC

Original release
- Network: BBC Four
- Release: 3 September – 17 September 2012

Treasures of Ancient Rome is a 2012 three-part documentary written and presented by Alastair Sooke. The series was produced by the BBC, and originally aired in September 2012 on BBC Four. In the documentary Sooke sets out to "debunk the myth that Romans didn't do art and were unoriginal". This is based on the view that Romans heavily incorporated Greek style in their art, and hence produced nothing new or original. Sooke has received some criticism from the media because there is no consensus among academics on this topic, and hence no 'myth' exists in the first place.

== Episode one: Warts 'n' All ==
In this episode Sooke begins by focussing on two major works of art, the Capitoline Wolf and the Capitoline Brutus at the Capitoline Museum in Rome. He informs us that through the process of carbon-dating scientists have found the she-wolf to be a thousand years younger than it was formerly considered to be. He then looks at the Treu Head in the British Museum, and suggests that it must have been fully painted in antiquity, a finding scientists have confirmed from traces of pigment found on the bust. Other artworks featured in this episode include the Altar of Domitius Ahenobarbus, the Tomb of Eurysaces the Baker, the Alexander Mosaic and the Villa of the Mysteries of Pompeii, the Head of Augustus and the Blacas Cameo in the British Museum, and the Ara Pacis in Rome.

== Episode two: Pomp and Perversion ==
In the second episode Sooke explores the legacy of the Romans in France. He begins by introducing the well-preserved Maison Carrée, a Roman temple in southern France dedicated to Gaius Caesar and Lucius Caesar, the grandsons of Augustus. He then looks at the Great Cameo of France in the Bibiliotheque Nationale. Sooke then returns to Italy, introducing the well-known Latin work The Twelve Caesars by Suetonius, and referencing it in relation to the art works discussed. He shows the grotto of Tiberius at Sperlonga, and the sculpture of the Blinding of Polyphemus in the Sperlonga Museum. Other major artworks featured in this episode include the Frescoed wall from the House of Livia, the Hanging Marsyas in the Louvre, the Farnese Bull, the Warren Cup in the British Museum, Nero's Villa Poppaea, the Equestrian Statue of Marcus Aurelius, the Arch of Titus, Trajan's Column, Hadrian's mausoleum Castel Sant'Angelo, sculptures of the young boy Antinous including Antinous Mondragone, and Hadrian's Villa.

== Episode three: The Empire Strikes Back ==
Sooke looks at late Roman art in this episode. He travels to Libya and discovers how late-Roman art took an African turn in the ancient city of Leptis Magna. He explores the Arch of Septimus Severus, Roman emperor in AD 193, and the Villa Selene. Other important artworks featured in this episode are the Portrait of Artemidorus, the Mildenhall Dish, the Portland Vase and the Lycurgus Cup in the British Museum, the Roman Baths in Bath, the Portonaccio sarcophagus in Rome, the Portrait of the Four Tetrarchs in Venice, the famous mosaics of Mausoleum of Galla Placidia, and the Basilica of San Vitale in Ravenna.
