= Star Wars Infinities =

Graphic novel trilogy

Star Wars Infinities is a graphic novel trilogy published by Dark Horse Comics from 2002 to 2004. It tells a non-canon alternate version of each film in the original Star Wars trilogy in which a point of divergence occurs and changes the outcome of the story. Each individual Infinities story is unrelated to the others and is set within the timeline of their original film.

== A New Hope ==
Star Wars Infinities: A New Hope

Publication information
- Publishing company: Dark Horse Comics
- Subject: Star Wars
- Genre: Science fiction
- Release date(s): 6 February 2002
- Country: United States
- Language: English
- No. of pages: 96
- ISBN: ISBN 1-56971-648-X

Expanded Universe
- Era: Infinities
- Series: Star Wars Infinities
- Canon: N
- Followed by: Star Wars: Infinities - The Empire Strikes Back

Creative team
- Script writer: Chris Warner
- Cover artist(s): Tony Harris; Chris Blythe
- Penciller(s): Drew Johnson
- Inker(s): Ray Snyder
- Colorist(s): Dave McCaig
- Letterer(s): Steve Dutro
- Designer(s): Keith Wood
- Editor(s): Dave Land
- Assistant editor(s): Philip Simon
- Publisher(s): Mike Richardson

Star Wars Infinities: A New Hope is a 2002 four-part story arc in the Star Wars Infinities series of comic books. It is an extended alternate ending of the 1977 film Star Wars in which Luke Skywalker's proton torpedoes fail to destroy the Death Star.

=== Synopsis ===
At the Battle of Yavin, events begin to change when the torpedoes fired by Luke Skywalker experience a technical malfunction and fail to destroy the Death Star, but prevent the complete destruction of Yavin 4. Unable to fire a fully charged shot from the Death Star's superlaser, Governor Tarkin orders the technicians to fire, but the reduced power only nearly levels the Massassi Temple on the moon's surface.

The Imperials send out a wing of TIE Fighters to pick off the remaining members of Red Squadron. Luke, enraged by the failure of the mission and the apparent destruction of Rebel base, turns his fighter to face the TIEs alone. Eventually, Han Solo convinces Luke to flee and the Millennium Falcon jumps into hyperspace with Luke's X-Wing on its tail.

The Rebel forces attempt to flee the Yavin system, but are captured by the Imperials. The Rebel leaders are imprisoned on the Death Star to await execution, but Princess Leia is taken to Coruscant, where she is put under house arrest at Emperor Palpatine's's residence, the great former Jedi Temple. Once there, Darth Vader subtly begins Leia's conversion to the dark side of the Force.

After the Falcon drops out of hyperspace, Luke and Han argue and Luke accuses Han of having abandoned the Rebellion. Luke pulls out his lightsaber and threatens to kill Han. Obi-Wan Kenobi's ghost then appears and tells Luke that he is moving into the dark side. Obi-Wan then instructs Luke to travel to Dagobah and seek out the Jedi Master Yoda. Han takes Luke to Dagobah, where he begins his training under Yoda's tutelage. Han then leaves with Chewbacca to finish the repairs on the Falcon. While on Dagobah, Luke enters a mysterious cave as part of his training. There, he fights and kills a vision of Darth Vader and is shocked to find Leia's face under the helmet.

Five years later, the Empire celebrates the fifth anniversary of the Rebellion's defeat by renaming the Death Star the Justice Star, which then eclipses Coruscant's sun as a sign of everlasting peace. Now trained in the ways of the Sith, Leia convinces the Emperor to reinstate the Imperial Senate. Han and Chewbacca watch coverage of the celebrations in a bar on Ord Mantell and then board the Falcon and head back to Dagobah.

On Dagobah, Luke's training is nearing completion. The last test is for Luke to re-enter the cave. Luke is again confronted by a vision of Vader but is now able to overcome his fears and completely connect to the Force. Han arrives soon after and informs Luke of Leia's whereabouts. Yoda then reveals to Luke the truth that Leia is really his sister and that Vader is their father.

Luke, Yoda, Han, Chewbacca and R2-D2 then take the Falcon to the Coruscant system. Once there, the Falcon lands on the Justice Star where Yoda and R2-D2 disembark. Yoda confronts Tarkin, now an admiral, and takes control of him with a Jedi mind trick.

Chewbacca flies the Falcon to Coruscant, where Luke and Han attempt to infiltrate the Emperor's palace. Once there, Luke and Han defeat a number of red-cloaked Imperial Guards and a reprogrammed, more aggressive C-3PO before confronting the Emperor and his two apprentices, Vader and Leia. At his master's orders, Vader turns his lightsaber over to Leia, who duels with Luke. Luke refuses to kill her and reveals to her that she is his sister. When Leia refuses to kill her brother, the Emperor attacks them both with Force lightning. Vader intervenes to protect Luke and Leia.

Luke, Leia, Han and C-3PO then escape to the Falcon as the Emperor overcomes Vader. Yoda, using R2-D2 to control the Justice Star's orbit, contacts the Emperor and announces that he is coming to see him and will be there soon. The Justice Star crashes into Coruscant, destroying both the planet and the battle station and killing Yoda, Tarkin and the Emperor.

Later, R2-D2's memory is inserted into an identical body. The story ends with Luke and Leia being visited by the ghosts of Obi-Wan, Yoda and Anakin Skywalker during the inaugural celebration of the first Chancellor of the New Republic, Leia, on the planet Naboo.

== The Empire Strikes Back ==
Star Wars Infinities: The Empire Strikes Back

Publication information
- Publishing company: Dark Horse Comics
- Subject: Star Wars
- Genre: Science fiction
- Release date(s): 2 April 2003
- Country: United States
- Language: English
- No. of pages: 96
- ISBN: ISBN 1-56971-904-7

Expanded Universe
- Series: Star Wars Infinities
- Canon: N
- Preceded by: Star Wars: Infinities - A New Hope
- Followed by: Star Wars: Infinities - Return of the Jedi

Star Wars Infinities: The Empire Strikes Back is a 2003 four-part story arc in the Star Wars Infinities series of comic books. It is an alternate telling of the 1980 film The Empire Strikes Back in which Luke Skywalker freezes to death during the blizzard on Hoth. The comic is not a direct sequel to Star Wars Infinities: A New Hope, but rather a sequel to the events after the actual film version of A New Hope.

=== Synopsis ===
Three years after the Rebels' success at the Battle of Yavin, the Alliance sets up a new base on the remote ice world of Hoth. After escaping from a Wampa ice monster, Luke sees the spirit of Obi-Wan instructing him to go to Dagobah and find the Jedi Master Yoda. Events begin to change when Han's Tauntaun dies before Han can find the missing Luke. Unable to find Luke in time and with no way to keep him warm, Han is unable to save Luke from death by exposure. But before Luke's death, the young Jedi imparts Obi-Wan's message to Han.

Later, during the funeral for Luke, Han tells Leia that he has to go to Dagobah, believing that he is to train as Jedi. Just then, the Empire attacks and the Rebellion starts to evacuate Hoth. The Millennium Falcon, unable to effectively escape the Hoth System due to a malfunctioning hyperdrive, sets a course for Bespin, where Han hopes he can get repairs to the ship. Unbeknownst to Han, Darth Vader has hired a number of bounty hunters to follow the Falcon, including Boba Fett, who follows the Falcon to Bespin.

Upon his arrival at Bespin, Han meets up with his gambling buddy Lando Calrissian in Cloud City. Casually laughing off Han's claim that he's going to become a Jedi, Lando agrees to repair the Falcon's hyperdrive. When Lando returns to his office, he finds Boba Fett sitting at his desk, demanding that Han, Leia, Chewbacca and C-3PO be turned over to him, but what Boba does not know is that they have already arrived (as Han decided not to go into the asteroid field). Fett is led into a trap by Lando and is knocked unconscious after grappling with Han and Chewbacca.

After the repairs are finished and the Falcon leaves Bespin, Lando returns to his office to admire his new desk, which is crafted using Boba Fett now carbonite-encased. However, Vader's ship arrives soon after the Falcon leaves and demands that Lando turn over the Rebels to him. Upon learning that the Falcon has already left, Vader orders the devastating bombardment of Cloud City, killing every inhabitant.

Eventually, the Falcon arrives at Dagobah where Han is surprised that he is not to be trained as a Jedi, but Leia is instead. Yoda tells Leia that Luke was her brother and her father is Darth Vader. Han, determined to settle his debt with Jabba the Hutt, leaves Leia on Dagobah to train with Yoda.

During the next several months, Han gathers together the money he needs to pay off Jabba, Leia trains with great fervor, and Darth Vader continues his search for Luke, not knowing the youth's fate; dismissing rumors that Luke has died, Vader insists that he can still sense Luke's presence.

Eventually, Han, Chewbacca, and C-3PO return to Tatooine to settle Han's debt, but upon their arrival, they are captured by Jabba's thugs and the Falcon is stolen by a bounty hunter. Han and Chewbacca are taken to Jabba's palace where they are forced to do battle with two nexu that Jabba keeps in a pit beneath his audience chamber. Han and Chewbacca are able to escape with R2-D2's help, and the now freed nexu tear through Jabba's palace, destroying everything in sight. In the confusion, Han and Chewbacca are able to board a Hutt shuttlecraft and escape to the docked Falcon in Mos Eisley.

Soon after Han's escape, Vader arrives at Jabba's palace to question him about Han's presence. Jabba says that he does not know where Han is now. Vader recognizes C-3PO and demands that his former creation be handed over to him. After returning to his ship, Vader dismantles C-3PO and retrieves Dagobah's location from the droid's memory.

Back on Dagobah, Leia is in the last stages of her training. Yoda sends her on a mission to find a crystal for her lightsaber from a nearby cave. During Leia's absence, Vader arrives and confronts Yoda. Using his connection to the Force, Yoda delves deep into Vader's psyche and confronts the man inside, Anakin Skywalker, who is surrounded by multiple layers of the dark side of the Force. During the mental battle, Leia finds her crystal and receives an image of Vader confronting Yoda. In his mind, Anakin fights off shadows of long-deceased Jedi such as Obi-Wan Kenobi, Mace Windu and Qui-Gon Jinn. During the confrontation, Vader learns of Luke's death. Vader is then able to deliver a fatal blow to Yoda despite the mental link, severing the Jedi's lock on his mind.

Leia then arrives and duels with Vader. Vader offers her the chance to join him and rule the galaxy, but Leia refuses. Before Vader can strike her down, Han and Chewbacca arrive in the Falcon. Han then fires on Vader and kills him. Before Yoda dies, he tells Leia to pass what she has learned on to others. Leia burns her father's body on a funeral pyre before leaving with Han on the Falcon to rejoin the Rebels and save the galaxy.

== Return of the Jedi ==
Star Wars Infinities: Return of the Jedi

Publication information
- Publishing company: Dark Horse Comics
- Subject: Star Wars
- Genre: Science fiction
- Release date(s): 28 July 2004
- Country: United States
- Language: English
- No. of pages: 104
- ISBN: ISBN 1-59307-206-6

Expanded Universe
- Series: Star Wars Infinities
- Canon: N
- Preceded by: Star Wars: Infinities - The Empire Strikes Back

Star Wars Infinities: Return of the Jedi is a 2004 four-part story arc in the Star Wars Infinities series of comic books. It is an alternate telling of the 1983 film Return of the Jedi in which C-3PO is damaged in Jabba the Hutt's throne room, and there is no one to translate for Jabba and Leia. The comic is not a direct sequel to the previous Infinities stories, but rather a sequel to the events after the actual film versions of A New Hope and The Empire Strikes Back.

=== Synopsis ===
Princess Leia, posing as the bounty hunter Boushh, infiltrates Jabba's palace in an attempt to rescue Han Solo, who has been frozen in carbonite. During the negotiations, C-3PO is translating for the disguised Leia, until Jabba knocks C-3PO over and the droid is damaged and unable to function. With no translator, Leia is forced to reveal her identity and she threatens Jabba with a thermal detonator, telling him to release Solo.

During the ensuing melee, Leia and Chewbacca chase after Boba Fett, who escapes with Han Solo's carbonite-encased body. Leia fires on Fett but misses and hits the carbonite block's life support control panel. Leia, Chewbacca and a disguised Lando escape from Jabba's palace and reunite with Luke shortly before the thermal detonator goes off, killing everyone within Jabba's palace. Luke promises Leia that he will find Han.

On Dagobah, Yoda, now on his deathbed, senses that he will die before Luke arrives. On Tatooine, Luke is able to get a lead on Boba Fett's whereabouts. Yoda dies on Dagobah; Luke and Emperor Palpatine both sense it. The Emperor sends Vader to Dagobah to investigate.

Luke arrives on Dagobah and is greeted by Yoda and Obi-Wan's ghosts. They confirm Vader's claim that he is Luke's father and reveal that Leia is Luke's sister. Realizing that he has to confront Vader on his own, Luke has R2-D2 record a message for Leia and send a message to the Rebellion and takes off from the planet. Just then, a Star Destroyer drops out of hyperspace over Dagobah; when his ship is caught in a tractor beam, Luke has R2-D2 send a second transmission before the Empire has a chance to jam the signal. Luke, captured by Vader, is taken to the second Death Star in orbit over Endor and is brought before the Emperor.

Meanwhile, Boba Fett is holding a meeting with Imperial officials, hoping to sell them Han in his carbonite block. Leia, Chewbacca and Lando track Fett down and interrupt the meeting, and kill Fett in the skirmish. Leia and the others return to the Rebel fleet with Han's frozen body. After thawing out Han from the carbonite, Leia is informed by a medic that the damage to the life support control unit resulted in Han becoming permanently blind. Lando then prepares the Falcon for an assault on the second Death Star, set to commence when the station's energy shield is destroyed by a Rebel unit on Endor's moon.

Before the fleet leaves for Endor, Leia receives Luke's message from R2-D2 which reveals that they are twins and that Vader is their father. A second transmission reveals Luke's subsequent capture and that no rescue attempt is to be made. Leia takes the Slave-1, commandeered after Fett's death, and heads straight to the Death Star to rescue Luke. Han realizes what has happened and asks Lando if he can accompany him and Chewbacca on the Falcon.

Leia arrives at the Death Star, but is soon captured and brought before the Emperor. Meanwhile, the Rebel fleet outside the Death Star engages the Imperial fleet while waiting for the ground assault team to destroy the shield generator. However, the battle between the Rebel and Imperial units on Endor disturbs the Ewoks, causing them to attack both sides.

On the Death Star, Palpatine orders Vader to kill Leia. Luke unleashes his lightsaber and duels with Vader himself. Vader overpowers Luke and the Emperor tells him to join them or die. Leia attempts to intervene, but is subdued by Force Lightning from the Emperor.

Han, despite his blindness, takes Chewbacca's place in the Falcon's gunner turret after Chewbacca is injured. The Falcon flies down to Endor after a Kamikaze Rebel sacrifices himself to destroy the Imperial bunker exposing the shield over the moon, and destroy the shield generator itself, allowing the Rebel fleet in space to enter the half-exposed Death Star. Lando takes the Falcon back to the Death Star to rescue Luke and Leia.

Luke is face-to-face with Vader, and reveals that he and Leia are Vader's children. Vader is stunned by the revelation but declares that it is now too late. Luke and Vader's duel continues. Vader overpowers Luke, at the cost of one of his arms. However, Vader is unable to kill his own children and surrenders; this turns Vader away from the dark side of the Force, and he becomes Anakin Skywalker once again.

During the duel, the Emperor escapes and Luke and Leia carry their wounded father to the Falcon waiting in the docking bay; they escape and the Death Star explodes. Sometime later, on the Rebel flagship, Luke informs Mon Mothma that the Emperor is alive and still a threat. Anakin, a Jedi once more and now clad in a white variation of the life-support suit he wore as Vader, agrees to help the Rebels track down Palpatine.

== See also ==
- Elseworlds, a similar concept by DC Comics
- Star Wars Tales
- Star Wars: Visionaries
- What If?, a similar concept by Marvel Comics
