= Star Wars: Empire =

2002 series of comics

Cover of Star Wars: Empire #1 (September 2002)

Star Wars: Empire is a series of comics published by Dark Horse Comics. The first issue was released on 4 September 2002. It ran for 40 issues, and was continued in the Star Wars: Rebellion series.

== Story arcs ==
=== Betrayal ===
Betrayal consists of issues 1 to 4.

On Coruscant, Darth Vader, Grand Moff Trachta and Moff Kadir test the blaster accuracy of a battalion of a newly trained stormtroopers. Vader is so impressed by their skill that he orders them sent to escort Governor Wilhuff Tarkin to the Death Star. Kadir objects, as the men were assigned to his Coruscant City Guard. Vader threatens him that the previous commander of Coruscant Security also made demands for more soldiers, and that Kadir should be silent if he doesn't wish to share his predecessor's fate. As Vader leaves, Kadir and Trachta express their annoyance with the Sith. Trachta hints that there might be a solution to the Sith problem, and tells Kadir that he'll be sent for.

Emperor Palpatine and Trachta meet. Palpatine asks Trachta to provide a skilled detachment of stormtroopers for his escort to the Death Star. He then says that he would have assigned Trachta to oversee the construction of the Death Star instead of Tarkin, if only Trachta wasn't necessary for the Emperor's operations on Coruscant. Meanwhile, Darth Vader thinks back to a conversation he had with Qui-Gon Jinn before he was introduced to the Jedi Council. He then meets with Palpatine, who gives him a mission to hunt down a lightsaber-wielding criminal on the planet Dargulli. They both suspect it could be one of Vader's children.

=== Princess ... Warrior ===
Princess ... Warrior is a two-part story arc written by Randy Stradley. The first issue was published on 5 February 2003. The story is set one year before the Battle of Yavin in Star Wars: Episode IV – A New Hope.

=== Sacrifice ===
Sacrifice is the 7th issue of the Star Wars: Empire comic book series, featuring Boba Fett. It was originally published on 9 April 2003, and later collected in the Boba Fett: Man with a Mission trade paperback.

=== Darklighter ===
Darklighter is a four-part story arc written by Paul Chadwick. The first issue was published on 21 May 2003. The story is set shortly before, and during the Battle of Yavin.

=== The Short, Happy Life of Roons Sewell ===
The Short, Happy Life of Roons Sewell is a two-part story arc written by Paul Chadwick. The first issue was published on 23 July 2003. Shortly before the Battle of Yavin, General Jan Dodonna speaks at the funeral of his predecessor, Roons Sewell. He first tells of how Sewell became a disaffected actor after the Empire killed his love interest. Then, he tells of Sewell's days with the Rebellion and how he died in battle.

=== What Sin Loyalty? ===
What Sin Loyalty? is the 13th issue of the series. It was originally published on 26 November 2003, and later collected in The Imperial Perspective trade paperback.

4 days BBY, the planet Ralltiir. What was supposed to be a small rebel cell turned out to be a planetwide rebellion. Commander Akobi led Imperial forces. In some cases, the Rebels used women and children to defend themselves. The Rebels jammed communications and disrupted sensors. During an Imperial bombing run on a Rebel supply depot, the TIE bomber sensors failed. Akobi ordered them to go on anyway. The Bombers bombed a Med Center by accident, killing scores of civilians. The Imperials covered it up, and made Akobi into a hero. While he was trying to get power back up, the Rebels tried to bomb him. His friend and bodyguard, a Stormtrooper, TK-622 saved him. The Commander believed it to be an accident. Akobi and 622 were then assigned to the Death Star. During a meeting of officers, a RA-7 Death Star Droid opened fire, killing some of the officers. 622 shot it down before it could do more harm. The remains of the droid was brought to a Technician. While he was scanning it 622 came across an explicit order to kill Commander Akobi. Just then, the droid's memory banks exploded. While TK-622 was escorting Commander Akobi to a medals ceremony for his actions on Ralltiir, an errant probe droid attacked them. It severely wounded Akobi. While medtechs were fighting to save Akobi's life, 622 tried to track any leads. He did not find anything that could help. At this time, the Millennium Falcon was brought on board, eventually escaping with Princess Leia. Akobi died, but not before telling 622 about what really happened on Ralltiir. TK-622 went to the tech's station, where he was attacked by the Technician. They begin to fight, as the Battle of Yavin rages. A nearby surface impact caused debris to fall on the Technician, killing him. Before his death though, the traitor confessed to the attacks on Akobi from the power generator bomb on Ralltiir, to the probe droid's attack. The Technician was from Ralltiir, and was a Rebel agent. TK-622 watched as Luke Skywalker's X-wing starfighter fired into the Thermal Exhaust Port. He knew the station was about to explode, and in his last seconds, he reflected on his life.

=== The Savage Heart ===
The Savage Heart is the 14th issue of the series. It was originally published on 10 December 2003, and later collected in The Imperial Perspective trade paperback.

Escaping from the Battle of Yavin in his Advanced TIE fighter, Darth Vader crash lands on the planet Vaal. The only Imperial presence on the planet is a small Imperial communications outpost, led by the lazy Sergeant Reybn and two other men. They prefer to relax and have fun, rather than doing actual work, reasoning that they're on one of the Empire's most distant outposts. Meanwhile, Vader encounters a pack of canine creatures, who attempt to kill him. After slaying the pack leader, Vader is regarded as the new leader by the hounds. He helps them kill a large, horned mammal, then walks to the Imperial outpost, with the pack following him. The outpost crew is shocked over seeing Vader suddenly arrive, and are petrified as they watch him enter their Lambda-class shuttle. As Vader blasts off, the hounds kill Reybn and the two other men. Later, Vader arrives on Coruscant, and informs a commander that the communications outpost on Vaal will need a new crew.

=== To the Last Man ===
To the Last Man is a three-part story arc written by Welles Hartley. The first issue was published on 28 January 2004. The story is set during the same time period as the events in A New Hope.

=== Target: Vader ===
Target: Vader is the 19th issue of the series. It was originally published on May 12, 2004, and later collected in The Imperial Perspective trade paperback. The events in this story take place approximately five months after the events in A New Hope.

Darth Vader arrives on Void Station, an asteroid city, seeking the Bothan information broker Jib Kopatha. Vader complains that Kopatha has not provided the Empire with any information other than speculations for several months. To re-establish the Empire's faith in him, Vader says, Kopatha must provide him with information regarding the Rebel Alliance. Kopatha complies, and tries to persuade Vader to stay in the city for a few days, offering him various delicate foods and women, but is turned down. As Vader walks back to the hangar to leave, A Falleen woman named Xora approaches him, promising him information about the Rebels. Vader follows her into a seemingly empty room, where he is attacked by several Falleen, seeking revenge for his massacre of an entire city on the planet Falleen. Despite there being many of them and one landing a blow on him, he manages to kill them all. Vader grabs Xora by the throat says he doesn't like to be reminded of his past and chokes her to death before leaving.

=== A Little Piece of Home ===
A Little Piece of Home is a two-part story arc written by Ron Marz. The first issue was published on 26 May 2004. About six months after the Battle of Yavin, Princess Leia visits Raal Panteer, a childhood love interest, on a moon of Ryloth, which she hopes could serve as the new Rebel base. While there, Panteer shows Leia the natural wonders of the moon's jungle, but they are attacked by the creatures that inhabit it. Panteer dies, and Leia leaves regretting putting another society into danger.

=== Alone Together ===
Alone Together is the 22nd issue of the series. It was originally published on 14 July 2004, and later collected in the Allies and Adversaries trade paperback. The events in this story take place approximately six months after the events in A New Hope. Supply Officer Deena Shan goes along on a mission with Han, Chewie, and Leia when they are forced to evacuate the Rebel fleet. She learns how dedicated the Rebel heroes are to each other despite the dangers they face.

=== The Bravery of Being Out of Range ===
The Bravery of Being Out of Range is the 23rd issue of the series. It was originally published on 18 August 2004, and later collected in the Allies and Adversaries trade paperback. The events in this story take place approximately six months after the events in A New Hope.

=== Idiot's Array ===
Idiot's Array is a two-part story arc written by Ron Marz. The first issue was published on 8 September 2004. Approximately six months after the Battle of Yavin, Han reveals his Rebel involvement to Sheel Odala, an old acquaintance. He is betrayed by Odala and tortured for information on the Rebellion's whereabouts. Odala has a change of heart and asks Chewie to help her save Han.

=== "General" Skywalker ===
"General" Skywalker is a two-part story arc written by Ron Marz. The first issue was published on 10 November 2004. The story is set approximately seven months after the Battle of Yavin.

=== Wreckage ===
Wreckage is the 28th issue of the series. It was originally published on 29 December 2004 The events in this story take place approximately seven months after the events in A New Hope.

=== In the Shadows of Their Fathers ===
In the Shadows of Their Fathers is a two-part story arc written by Thomas Andrews. The first issue was published on 23 February 2005. The story is set approximately eight months after the Battle of Yavin.

=== The Price of Power ===
The Price of Power is the 31st issue of the series. It was originally published on 18 May 2005, and in October 2006, it was collected in the In the Footsteps of Their Fathers trade paperback. The events in this story take place approximately eight months after the events in A New Hope.

=== A Model Officer ===
A Model Officer is the 35th issue of the series. It was originally published on 21 September 2005, and in January 2007, it was collected in The Wrong Side of the War trade paperback. The events in this story take place approximately eight months after the events in A New Hope.

=== The Wrong Side of the War ===
The Wrong Side of the War is a five-part story arc written by Welles Hartley. The first issue was published on 12 October 2005. The story is set approximately eight months after the Battle of Yavin.

A squad of Rebel soldiers, led by Luke Skywalker, infiltrate an Empire-run fueling depot in an attempt to steal much-needed fuel and rescue a valuable prisoner.

The Rebels are accepted as Imperial officers and allowed to on base under restrictions. The mission is also complicated by the revelation of prisoners from a planet, Jabiim, that the Rebels had lost to the Imperials very recently.

The focus of previous stories, Lt. Sunber, had been on Jabim just recently. The loss of many of his men against the Rebels and the disheartening way the prisoners are treated make him question his role in the Imperial army.

== Issues ==
- Star Wars Empire 1: Betrayal, Part 1
- Star Wars Empire 2: Betrayal, Part 2
- Star Wars Empire 3: Betrayal, Part 3
- Star Wars Empire 4: Betrayal, Part 4
- Star Wars Empire 5: Princess ... Warrior, Part 1
- Star Wars Empire 6: Princess ... Warrior, Part 2
- Star Wars Empire 7: Sacrifice
- Star Wars Empire 8: Darklighter, Part 1
- Star Wars Empire 9: Darklighter, Part 2
- Star Wars Empire 10: The Short, Happy Life of Roons Sewell, Part 1
- Star Wars Empire 11: The Short, Happy Life of Roons Sewell, Part 2
- Star Wars Empire 12: Darklighter, Part 3
- Star Wars Empire 13: What Sin Loyalty?
- Star Wars Empire 14: The Savage Heart
- Star Wars Empire 15: Darklighter, Part 4
- Star Wars Empire 16: To the Last Man, Part 1
- Star Wars Empire 17: To the Last Man, Part 2
- Star Wars Empire 18: To the Last Man, Part 3
- Star Wars Empire 19: Target: Vader
- Star Wars Empire 20: A Little Piece of Home, Part 1
- Star Wars Empire 21: A Little Piece of Home, Part 2
- Star Wars Empire 22: Alone Together
- Star Wars Empire 23: The Bravery of Being Out of Range
- Star Wars Empire 24: Idiot's Array, Part 1
- Star Wars Empire 25: Idiot's Array, Part 2
- Star Wars Empire 26: "General" Skywalker, Part 1
- Star Wars Empire 27: "General" Skywalker, Part 2
- Star Wars Empire 28: Wreckage
- Star Wars Empire 29: In the Shadows of Their Fathers, Part 1
- Star Wars Empire 30: In the Shadows of Their Fathers, Part 2
- Star Wars Empire 31: The Price of Power
- Star Wars Empire 32: In the Shadows of Their Fathers, Part 3
- Star Wars Empire 33: In the Shadows of Their Fathers, Part 4
- Star Wars Empire 34: In the Shadows of Their Fathers, Part 5
- Star Wars Empire 35: A Model Officer
- Star Wars Empire 36: The Wrong Side of the War, Part 1
- Star Wars Empire 37: The Wrong Side of the War, Part 2
- Star Wars Empire 38: The Wrong Side of the War, Part 3
- Star Wars Empire 39: The Wrong Side of the War, Part 4
- Star Wars Empire 40: The Wrong Side of the War, Part 5

== Trade paperback collections ==
- Star Wars: Empire Vol 1: Betrayal (#1-4)
- Star Wars: Empire Vol 2: Darklighter (#8-12, 15)
- Star Wars: Empire Vol 3: The Imperial Perspective (#13-19)
- Star Wars: Empire Vol 4: The Heart of the Rebellion (#5-6, 20–22; A Valentine Story one-shot)
- Star Wars: Empire Vol 5: Allies and Adversaries (#23-27)
- Star Wars: Empire Vol 6: In the Shadows of Their Fathers (#29-34)
- Star Wars: Empire Vol 7: The Wrong Side of the War (#35-40)
- Star Wars Omnibus: Boba Fett (includes #7, 28)
- Star Wars Omnibus: At War with the Empire Vol. 1 (#1-6, 10–11, 13–14, 19–22, 24–25, 31)
- Star Wars Omnibus: At War with the Empire Vol. 2 (includes #26-27, 29–30, 32–35; A Valentine Story one-shot)
- Star Wars Omnibus: The Other Sons of Tatooine (includes #8-9, 12, 15–18, 23, 36–40)
