= Star Wars (manga) =

Manga adaptation of Star Wars films

- The first volume of the Star Wars manga, published in Japan on July 15, 1998

スター・ウォーズ
- Genre: Science fiction
- Manga

A New Hope
- Written by: George Lucas
- Illustrated by: Hisao Tamaki
- Published by: MediaWorks
- English publisher: NA: Dark Horse Comics
- Published: 1997
- Volumes: 2
- Manga

The Empire Strikes Back
- Written by: George Lucas
- Illustrated by: Toshiki Kudo
- Published by: MediaWorks
- English publisher: NA: Dark Horse Comics
- Published: 1998
- Volumes: 2
- Manga

Return of the Jedi
- Written by: George Lucas
- Illustrated by: Shinichi Hiromoto
- Published by: MediaWorks
- English publisher: NA: Dark Horse Comics
- Published: 1999
- Volumes: 2
- Manga

The Phantom Menace
- Written by: George Lucas
- Illustrated by: Kia Asamiya
- Published by: Shogakukan
- English publisher: NA: Dark Horse Comics
- Published: 2000
- Volumes: 1

The original Star Wars trilogy was adapted into manga by MediaWorks between 1997 and 1999: A New Hope (1977), The Empire Strikes Back (1980), and Return of the Jedi (1983). Later Shogakukan adapted The Phantom Menace (1999). They were published in English by Dark Horse Comics.

== Volumes ==
In the English versions the art was copied in mirror-image in order to be read from left to right and the content was split into more volumes than the Japanese edition.

=== A New Hope ===
Artwork – Hisao Tamaki
Volumes – 4
Volume 1: Luke meeting Obi-Wan and the droids, destruction of Luke's home
Volume 2: Meeting of Han Solo, journey to Death Star
Volume 3: Death Star events, Obi-Wan's death
Volume 4: Attack of Death Star

=== The Empire Strikes Back ===
Artwork – Toshiki Kudo
Volumes – 4
Volume 1: Hoth Battle
Volume 2: Meeting Yoda
Volume 3: Han, Leia, Chewbacca, C-3PO on Cloud City
Volume 4: Han frozen, Luke loses his hand to Vader

=== Return of the Jedi ===
Artwork – Shin'ichi Hiromoto
Volumes – 4
Volume 1: Everyone captured by Jabba
Volume 2: Escape from Jabba, head to Dagobah
Volume 3: Ewok village, Luke's capture
Volume 4: Death of Vader and Palpatine

=== The Phantom Menace ===
Artwork – Kia Asamiya
Volumes – 2
Volume 1: Finding of Anakin
Volume 2: Qui-Gon's death and Darth Maul battle
