= Star Wars Tales =

Comic book series published by Dark Horse Comics, 1999-2005

Star Wars Tales #1, September 1999

Star Wars Tales is a comic book series published by Dark Horse Comics, beginning on September 29, 1999, and completing its run on July 13, 2005. Each issue is 64 pages and features a few unrelated stories from various eras of the Star Wars timeline. Stories from issues #1–20 were retroactively labelled "Infinities", placing them outside the Star Wars canon, while those of issues #21–24 were considered to be within continuity, unless labelled otherwise. References to the stories were made within the Expanded Universe, the entirety of which was deemed non-canon by Lucasfilm in 2014.

The entire series was collected into six trade paperbacks, comprising four issues each.

== Issues and their canonicity ==
Issue number	Canonicity	Collected into
1	No	Star Wars Tales Volume 1
2	No	Star Wars Tales Volume 1
3	No	Star Wars Tales Volume 1
4	No	Star Wars Tales Volume 1
5	No	Star Wars Tales Volume 2
6	No	Star Wars Tales Volume 2
7	No	Star Wars Tales Volume 2
8	No	Star Wars Tales Volume 2
9	No	Star Wars Tales Volume 3
10	No	Star Wars Tales Volume 3
11	No	Star Wars Tales Volume 3
12	No	Star Wars Tales Volume 3
13	No	Star Wars Tales Volume 4
14	No	Star Wars Tales Volume 4
15	No	Star Wars Tales Volume 4
16	No	Star Wars Tales Volume 4
17	No	Star Wars Tales Volume 5
18	No	Star Wars Tales Volume 5
19	No	Star Wars Tales Volume 5
20	No	Star Wars Tales Volume 5
21	Yes, unless labelled otherwise	Star Wars Tales Volume 6
22	Yes, unless labelled otherwise	Star Wars Tales Volume 6
23	Yes, unless labelled otherwise	Star Wars Tales Volume 6
24	Yes, unless labelled otherwise	Star Wars Tales Volume 6

== Volume 1 ==
=== Issue #1 ===
Star Wars Tales 1

Publication information
- Subject: Star Wars
- Genre: Science fiction
- Release date: 29 September 1999
- Country: United States
- Language: English
- No. of pages: 64

Creative team
- Cover artist: Igor Kordey
- Designer: Mark Cox
- Editor: Peet Janes
- Assistant editor: Mike Hansen
- Publisher: Mike Richardson

==== Life, Death, and the Living Force ====
Script: Jim Woodring
Pencils: Robert Teranishi
Colors: Christopher Chuckry
14 pages
Galactic Year: 33 BBY
Preceded by: A Summer's Dream
Followed by: Incident at Horn Station

==== Mara Jade: A Night on the Town ====
Script: Timothy Zahn
Pencils: Igor Kordey
Colors: Keith Wood
16 Pages
Galactic Year: 5 ABY
Preceded by: Supply and Demand
Followed by: Marooned

==== Darth Vader: Extinction (Part 1) ====
Script: Ron Marz
Pencils: Claudio Castellini
Colors: Guy Major
16 Pages
Galactic Year: 1 BBY
Preceded by: Underworld: The Yavin Vassilika
Followed by: Darth Vader: Extinction (Part 2)

==== Skippy the Jedi Droid ====
Script: Peter David
Pencils: Martin Egeland
Inks: Howard S. Shum

Colors: Harold MacKinnon
8 Pages
Galactic Year: 0 ABY
Preceded by: X-Wing Rogue Squadron #1/2
Followed by: Resurrection

=== Issue #2 ===
Star Wars Tales 2

Publication information
- Subject: Star Wars
- Genre: Science fiction
- Release date: 5 January 2000
- Country: United States
- Language: English
- No. of pages: 64

Creative team
- Cover artist: Claudio Castellini
- Designer: Mark Cox
- Editor: Peet Janes
- Assistant editor: Dan Harris
- Publisher: Mike Richardson

==== Routine ====
Script: Tony Isabella
Pencils: John Nadeau
Colors: Dave Nestelle
8 Pages
Galactic Year: 5 BBY
Preceded by: Luke Skywalker: Walkabout
Followed by: Young Lando Calrissian

Han Solo and Chewbacca, flying the Jaina's Light (named after Han's mother), are stopped by the Vigilant, an Imperial ship. A Level One inspection is performed on Jaina's Light, but the Imperial Captain Deyd Llnewe and Lieutenant Raprice find nothing. This happens two more times, with the inspection being more intensive each time, Llnewe being convinced that Solo is up to something. After the third unsuccessful inspection, Han and Chewie are sent on their way, when Captain Llnewe suddenly realizes that the ships Solo was piloting were different each time; Han was not smuggling spice or some other illegal substance, but ships. Deyd orders his gunners to fire on Han, but he was long gone by then.

==== Darth Vader: Extinction (Part 2) ====
Script: Ron Marz
Pencils: Claudio Castellini
Inks: Jason Hvam
Colors: Guy Major
16 Pages
Galactic Year: 1 BBY
Preceded by: Darth Vader: Extinction (Part 1)
Followed by: The Hovel on Terk Street

==== Stop That Jawa! ====
Story & Art: Dave Cooper
8 Pages
Galactic Year: 3 ABY
Preceded by: Skreej
Followed by: A Hot Time in the Cold Town Tonite

==== Incident at Horn Station ====
Script: Dan Jolley
Pencils: Sean Phillips
Colors: Matthew Hollingsworth
18 Pages
Galactic Year: 33 BBY
Preceded by: Life, Death, and the Living Force
Followed by: Prelude to Rebellion

=== Issue #3 ===
Star Wars Tales 3

Publication information
- Subject: Star Wars
- Genre: Science fiction
- Release date: 29 March 2000
- Country: United States
- Language: English
- No. of pages: 64

Creative team
- Cover artist: Dave Dorman
- Designer: Mark Cox
- Editors: Dave Land & Peet Janes
- Assistant editor: Dan Harris
- Publisher: Mike Richardson

==== The Death of Captain Tarpals ====
Script: Ryder Windham
Pencils: Tom Fowler
Colors: Dave Nestelle
8 Pages
Galactic Year: 32.5 BBY
Preceded by: Darth Maul
Followed by: Episode 1: The Phantom Menace

In the Gungan city of Otoh Gunga, Chef Marshoo catches Jar Jar Binks in the kitchen trying to scavenge leftovers. Marshoo prepares to punch Binks just as Captain Roos Tarpals comes in to arrest Binks for the very same thing. He puts the handcuffs on Binks and takes him away. Soon after, Tarpals tells Binks that everyone down at the station is calling him "The Death of Captain Tarpals." Suddenly Tarpals is ambushed by Marshoo and some of his friends, who prepare to beat down Binks as they'd planned. They throw a frying pan at Binks, but he ducks, and it goes flying into his kaadu, who retaliates with a kick to Marshoo, sending him and his cohorts into a small fountain. Binks revives Tarpals, and asks to be released after taking care of Marshoo. Roos ignores him and takes him to the surface of Naboo, where he shall live for a long time to come.

==== Deal with a Demon ====
Script: John Ostrander
Pencils: Jan Duursema
Inks: Rick Magyar
Colors: Dan Jackson
10 Pages
Galactic Year: 32 BBY
Preceded by: Outlander
Followed by: Force Fiction

Vilmarh Grahrk has been hired by the people of Ootoola (who he fondly refers to as "fishfaces") to smuggle Princess Foolookoola off-planet; she is currently being hunted down by the purists of Ootoola, who previously killed the patriarch and his wife, seizing power of the planet. He and Naradan D'ulin, the caretaker of the princess, begin taking her to Villie's ship, when they're suddenly ambushed by a group of Ootoola purists. Villie hands the princess over, telling Naradan that the purists offered more credits than the loyalists did. Naradan and the princess are taken away and put into the purists' prison.

That night, Villie blows open the prison door and rescues them, only to get a punch in the face from Naradan. Vilmarh explains that before, with the princess running loose, everybody was looking for her, but now that they've assumed she's still locked up, nobody will be trying to find her. Naradan grabs a rifle in case she decides to shoot him, and they head out. They spot a couple of guards, and Villie casually walks up to them, steals one of their blasters, and shoots both of them. Villie, Naradan and the princess quickly escape the palace and head to Vilmarh's ship, the Inferno, where they are vocally greeted by NT. They fly off, Villie destroying the palace on his way up. They make their way to the planet Dur Sabon, where Foolookoola is to live her life among the Dur Sabon until she can return to Ootoola.

==== Lady Luck ====
Script: Rich Handley & Darko Macan
Pencils: Chris Brunner
Colors: Michelle Madgen & Dave Stewart
16 Pages
Galactic Year: 1 ABY
Preceded by: My Brother, My Enemy
Followed by: Dark Lord's Conscience

==== Three Against the Galaxy ====
Script: Rich Hedden
Pencils: Rick Leonardi
Inks: Mark Lipka
Colors: Dave McCaig
22 Pages
Galactic Year: 5 ABY
Preceded by: Marooned
Followed by: Boba Fett: Agent of Doom

=== Issue #4 ===
Star Wars Tales 4

Publication information
- Subject: Star Wars
- Genre: Science fiction
- Release date: 28 June 2000
- Country: United States
- Language: English
- No. of pages: 64

Creative team
- Cover artist: Kilian Plunkett
- Designer: Mark Cox
- Editor: Dave Land
- Assistant editor: Michael Carriglitto
- Publisher: Mike Richardson

==== Moment of Doubt ====
Script: Lovern Kindzierski
Pencils: Robert Teranishi
Colors: Dave McCaig
14 Pages
Galactic Year: 3 ABY
Preceded by: Duel a Dark Lord
Followed by: Hoth

The story takes place 3 A.B.Y. Awarru Tark arrives aboard the Star Destroyer Avenger in a YT-1300 freighter, answering Darth Vader's call for bounty hunters to find the Millennium Falcon. When he meets with Vader he immediately launches a vicious assault on the Sith Lord with Grenades and light blades that extend from his arms.

As Vader reaches into Tark's mind he finds Awarru Tark is actually Stauz Czycz. Czycz underwent a surgical transformation to implant a force field generator into his body, so that he could attack Vader as revenge, having lost his own family in an Imperial assault on his homeworld.

Using telekinesis to disable the generator, Vader decapitates Czycz, leaving him to consider Czycz's status as more machine than man.

==== A Death Star is Born ====
Script: Kevin Rubio
Pencils: Lucas Marangon
Colors: Dave Nestelle
12 Pages
Galactic Year: 2 BBY
Preceded by: The Black Cavern
Followed by: Han Solo At Stars' End

Moff Wilhuff Tarkin, Tol Sivron, and Bevel Lemelisk submit their Death Star proposal to Emperor Palpatine and Darth Vader. The perceived flaws of the schematics are humorously discussed. The appearance of Bevel Lemelisk is different in this comic than in any other source where he is portrayed. This was an intentional choice on behalf of the comic's creator, although for unknown reasons. One should also note the presence of Ackbar, a Mon Calamari, and Grand Moff Tarkin's slave, soon to be Rebel Alliance Admiral listening in through the door.

Several references in the story allude to popular culture, including the following:

- The Imperial insignia, reminiscent of Mickey Mouse-ears;
- A "Bob's Big Boy" fast food chain statue;
- A hologram of Yogi Bear;
- The starship from the Star Trek series known as Starship Enterprise.
- The Beatles' Yellow Submarine

==== Spare Parts ====
Script: Mark Evanier & Sergio Aragonés
Pencils: Sergio Aragonés
Colors: Tom Luth
4 Pages
Galactic Year: 22 ABY
Preceded by: Union
Followed by: Chewbacca

==== Sand Blasted ====
Story & Art: Kilian Plunkett
Colors: Dave Nestelle
28 Pages
Galactic Year: 4 ABY
Preceded by: The Jabba Tape
Followed by: A Day in the Life

== Volume 2 ==
=== Issue #5 ===
Star Wars Tales 5

Publication information
- Subject: Star Wars
- Genre: Science fiction
- Release date: 27 September 2000
- Country: United States
- Language: English
- No. of pages: 64

Creative team
- Cover artist: Andrew Robinson
- Designer: Mark Cox
- Editor: Dave Land
- Assistant editor: Michael Carriglitto
- Publisher: Mike Richardson

==== Yaddle's Tale: The One Below ====
Script: Dean Motter
Pencils: Jesus Saiz
Inks: Fernando Blanco
Colors: Dave Nestelle
16 Pages
Galactic Year: 245 BBY
Preceded by: Heart of Darkness
Followed by: Vow of Justice

Whilst discussing the possibility of knighting Yaddle the Jedi Council revisit the story of her training under the tutelage of Polvin Kut, two-hundred years prior.

On a mission to liberate the colonies of the Advozse Warlock Tulak the duo are betrayed on Koba, leading to Kut's death. The Padawan Yaddle is taken hostage by the Warlock but is impervious to his interrogations, warning him 'Rule by terror you do, die by fear you will'.

In time Tulak tires of the colony and leaves Koba. However, he seals Yaddle in a pit with the hope that he can use her as a future bargaining tool but she is soon forgotten. She is confined for a century, surviving on food and water provided by wardens left behind when Tulak left. Over the generations, the Koba society collapses, though the primitives still tend to her, lowering food as part of a ritual they barely understand. She is spoken of as The One Below. During this time Yaddle hones her Jedi skills.

Eventually an earthquake brings down the roof of her pit, allowing her to escape. Seeing the destruction of the nearby village she remains on the planet to aid the Kobans. She dedicates herself to teaching the children, society rebuilds around her. She is quietly content with her work until the day Kalut, Tulak's son, returns to Koba claiming it as his heirloom. He casually attacks, slaying many and deciding what, if anything to take, Forced to fight, Kulat ends up speared on his own weapon and dies.

On hearing the story the Jedi Council, in particular Yoda, are swayed to initiate her as a Jedi Master.

==== What They Called Me ====
Story & Art: Craig Thompson
4 Pages
This story is non-canon

==== A Summer's Dream ====
Script: Terry Moore
Pencils: Cliff Richards
Inks: P. Craig Russell
Colors: Matt Hollingsworth
12 Pages
Galactic Year: 33 BBY
Preceded by: Jedi Council: Acts of War
Followed by: Life, Death, and the Living Force

==== Hoth ====
Story & Art: Tony Millionaire
Colors: Michelle Madsen
2 Pages
Galactic Year: 3 ABY
Preceded by: Moment of Doubt
Followed by: Slippery Slope

An encounter on the frozen ice fields.

==== Lando's Commandos: On Eagle's Wings ====
Script: Ian Edginton
Pencils: Carlos Meglia
Colors: Michelle Madsen
22 Pages
Galactic Year: 4 ABY
Preceded by: Problem Solvers
Followed by: The Thrawn trilogy

Lando Calrissian is assigned to lead an operation against a faction of pirates responsible for personnel losses, equipment destruction, and a decline in the Rebellion's political standing. The mission incorporates a defector or former associate who previously trained the pirate group.

=== Issue #6 ===
Star Wars Tales 6

Publication information
- Subject: Star Wars
- Genre: Science fiction
- Release date: 20 December 2000
- Country: United States
- Language: English
- No. of pages: 64

Creative team
- Cover artist: Kilian Plunkett
- Designer: Mark Cox
- Editor: Dave Land
- Assistant editor: Michael Carriglito
- Publisher: Mike Richardson

==== The Hovel on Terk Street ====
Script: Tom Fassbender & Jom Pascoe
Pencils: Eric Powell
Inks: Drew Geraci & Keith Barnett
Colors: Dave Stewart
12 Pages
Galactic Year: 1 BBY
Preceded by: Extinction
Followed by: Rookies Rendezvous

==== The Max Rebo Band in "A Hot Time in the Cold Town Tonite!" ====
Script: Ian Edginton
Pencils: Mark Martin & Rick Neilsen
7 Pages
Galactic Year: 3 ABY
Preceded by: Stop That Jawa!
Followed by: The One That Got Away

==== Fortune, Fate, and the Natural History of the Sarlacc ====
Script: Mark Schultz
Pencils: Kellie Strom
9 Pages
Galactic Year: 12 BBY
Preceded by: Ghost
Followed by: Nerf Herder

==== Junkheap Hero ====
Script: Mark Evanier
Pencils: Sergio Aragonés
Colors: Dave McCaig
5 Pages
Galactic Year: 2 ABY
Preceded by: Lucky Stars
Followed by: River of Chaos

==== The Hidden ====
Script: Sean Konot & Scott Morse
Pencils: Scott Morse
7 Pages
Galactic Year: 2 ABY
Preceded by: A Valentine's Story: Breaking the Ice
Followed by: Lunch Break

==== Thank the Maker ====
Script: Ryder Windham
Pencils: Kilian Plunkett
Colors: Dave McCaig
9 Pages
Galactic Year: 3 ABY
Preceded by: Slippery Slope
Followed by: Hunger Pains

=== Issue #7 ===
Star Wars Tales 7

Publication information
- Subject: Star Wars
- Genre: Science fiction
- Release date: 7 March 2001
- Country: United States
- Language: English
- No. of pages: 64

Creative team
- Cover artist: Francisco Velasco
- Designer: Mark Cox
- Editor: Dave Land
- Assistant editor: Philip Simon
- Publisher: Mike Richardson

==== Single Cell ====
Script: Haden Blackman
Pencils: Jan Duursema
Inks: Ray Kryssing
Colors: Dave McCaig
12 Pages
Galactic Year: 32.5 BBY
Preceded by: Prelude to Rebellion
Followed by: Darth Maul

Aboard the Trade Federation battleship Stockade, the incarcerated Feeorin Nym recounts the story of how he got there to his Neimoidian cellmate ...

In orbit around Maramere in the Havoc, Nym, Kole and Jinkins waited for the mercenary Vana Sage and her 'buyers' (a group of high class bounty hunters) to trade experimental weapons for Stygium crystals.

Once on board the space station, Nym and his crew met the buyers to exchange goods. When Nym revealed that he had buried the power cells for the weapons as a safeguard, a fight ensues between the crew of the Havoc and the bounty hunters.

Under the threat of Droidekas, Sage captured the crew, sent Kole and Jinkins to Maramere in an escape pod, and took the Havoc as payment for delivering Nym to the Trade Federation.

Back in the cell, Merick and Bravo arrive to torture Nym who vows revenge on Vana Sage.

==== Nerf Herder ====
Script: Phil Amara
Pencils: Francisco Hererra
Inks: Howard M. Shum
Colors: Michelle Madsen
10 Pages
Galactic Year: 11 BBY
Preceded by: Fortune, Fate, and the Natural History of the Sarlacc
Followed by: Luke Skywalker: Detective

==== Jedi Chef (or Pizza Hutt) ====
Script: Randy Stradley
Art: Francisco Ruiz Velasco
8 Pages
Galactic Year: 34 BBY
Preceded by: Qui-Gon and Obi-Wan: Last Stand on Ord Mantell
Followed by: Nameless

Jedi Council members Micah Giiett and Plo Koon embark on a mission to planet Ord Mantell, to rescue famous chef Slabba Drewl from Corpo the Hutt. Apparently Drewl was enslaved to Corpo after losing a bet with the Hutt.

Corpo's priorities in life were gambling and food, and his prize possession was a MREM-02 kitchen droid, called Moreemohtwo. Giett bets Corpo that he can prepare a meal better than one made by Moreemohtwo. Corpo accepts the wager - if Giiett wins, Drewl is freed. If Moreemohtwo wins, then Giiett would also become enslaved to the Hutt.

Giiett secretly instructs Plo Koon to "sabotage" the meal prepared by the droid. The "cook-off" begins, with a host announcing the theme ingredient: Denusian squirmers. Giiett is bitten on the nose by a squirmer, and he uses his lightsaber to power-chop and flash cook the theme ingredient. Meanwhile, Plo Koon sneakily replaces Moreemohtwo's seebo sauce with droid oil, and slips gundar droppings, Rakririan burnout sauce and Bothan foot powder into Moreemohtwo's pot.

At the end of the cook-off, Moreemohtwo presents 5 dishes of delicious looking food, while Giett presents his two messy bowls of squirmer stew. After Corpo tastes Moreemohtwo's sabotaged meal, Corpo immediately releases Drewl from custody.

==== Outbid But Never Outgunned ====
Script: Beau Smith
Pencils: Mike Deodato Jr.
Inks: Neil Nelson
Colors: Dave McCaig
16 Pages
Galactic Year: 6 BBY
Preceded by: The Princess Leia Diaries (pages 1–7)
Followed by: Luke Skywalker: Walkabout

==== Force Fiction ====
Script: Kevin Rubio
Art: Lucas Marangon
Colors: Michelle Madsen
10 Pages
Galactic Year: 32 BBY
Preceded by: Deal with a Demon
Followed by: Nomad, Chapter one

Mace Windu and Yoda debate the possibility of training Anakin Skywalker while eating at a fast food restaurant, resorting to food-based analogies to make their points. At one point, Yoda uses his mind control powers on the waitress to make the meal free, to protect them from "high prices." They also fend off a robbery. At the end of the story, Supreme Chancellor Palpatine joins them and expresses his opinion that Skywalker would make a fine Jedi.

=== Issue #8 ===
Star Wars Tales 8

Publication information
- Subject: Star Wars
- Genre: Science fiction
- Release date: 13 June 2001
- Country: United States
- Language: English
- No. of pages: 64

Creative team
- Cover artist: Kia Asamiya
- Publisher: Mike Richardson

==== Captain Threepio ====
Script: Ryan Kinnaird
Art: Ryan Kinnaird
Letters: Jason Hvam
Editor: Phil Amara
6 Pages
Galactic Year: 0 ABY
Preceded by: Shadow Stalker
Followed by: Classic Star Wars Volume 3: Escape to Hoth

C-3PO and R2D2 are part of the droid complement of a ship carrying technology vital to the rebellion. When an attacks kills all the humans on board, something must be done. R2D2 has a plan.

==== The One That Got Away ====
Script: Andi Watson
Art: Andi Watson
8 Pages
Galactic Year: 3 ABY
Preceded by: A Hot Time in the Cold Town Tonite
Followed by: Return of the Jedi

==== The Secret Tales of Luke's Hand! ====
Script: Henry Gilroy
Art: Dario Brizuela
Colors: Cara L. Niece
Letters: Steve Dutro
8 Pages
Galactic Year: 15 ABY
Preceded by: Jedi Academy: Leviathan
Followed by: Apocalypse Endor

To help his son Anakin go to sleep, Han Solo tells the tale of what happened to Luke Skywalker's lost hand.

==== Death Star Pirates ====
Script: Henry Gilroy
Art: Glen Murakami
Colors: Don Skinner
20 Pages
Galactic Year: 0 ABY
Preceded by: Classic Star Wars Volume 3: Escape to Hoth
Followed by: Target: Vader

Among the last ships to leave the site of the Battle of Yavin, the Millennium Falcon is caught up in a battle with a formidable pirate ship. Luke Skywalker is there to assist, until he crashes into the ship's upper levels.

==== Bad Business ====
Script: John Ostrander
Pencils: Francis Portela
Inks: Howard M. Shum
Colors: Dave Nestelle
Lettering: Steve Dutro
12 Pages
Galactic Year: 30 BBY
Preceded by: Star Crash
Followed by: The Hunt for Aurra Sing

== Volume 3 ==
=== Issue #9 ===
Star Wars Tales 9

Publication information
- Subject: Star Wars
- Genre: Science fiction
- Release date: 10 October 2001
- Country: United States
- Language: English
- No. of pages: 64

Creative team
- Cover artist: Jon Foster
- Designer: Lia Ribacchi
- Editor: Dave Land
- Assistant editor: Philip Simon
- Publisher: Mike Richardson

==== Resurrection ====
Script: Ron Marz
Pencils: Rick Leonardi
Inks: Terry Austin
Colors: Raul Treviño
48 Pages
Galactic Year: 0 ABY
Preceded by: Skippy the Jedi Droid
Followed by: Trooper

==== Lil’ Maul in: Hate Leads to Lollipops ====
Story & Art: Dave McCaig
4 Pages
Galactic Year: 45 BBY
Preceded by: Survivors
Followed by: George R. Binks

==== The Rebel Four ====
Story & Art: Jay Stephens
4 Pages
Galactic Year: 1 BBY
Preceded by: Rookies Rendezvous: No Turning Back
Followed by: Way of the Wookiee

=== Issue #10 ===
Star Wars Tales 10

Publication information
- Subject: Star Wars
- Genre: Science fiction
- Release date: 12 December 2001
- Country: United States
- Language: English
- No. of pages: 64

Creative team
- Cover artist: Leinil Francis Yu
- Designer: Lia Ribacchi
- Editor: Dave Land
- Assistant editor: Philip Simon
- Publisher: Mike Richardson

==== Trooper ====
Script: Garth Ennis
Pencils: John McCrea
Inks: Jimmy Palmiotti
Colors: Brad Anderson
19 Pages
Galactic Year: 0 ABY
Preceded by: Resurrection
Followed by: Smuggler's Blues

==== Skreej ====
Script: Mike Kennedy
Pencils: Francisco Ruiz Velasco
Galactic Year: 3 ABY
Preceded by: Scoundrel's Wages
Followed by: Stop that Jawa!

==== Nameless ====
Script: Christian Read
Pencils: Chris Slane
Colors: Giulia Brusco & Matt Hollingsworth
Galactic Year: 34 BBY
Preceded by: Jedi Chef
Followed by: Marked

Darth Sidious questions his apprentice Darth Maul to explain the story behind his new double-bladed lightsaber. Maul was ordered to the Jentares system by Sidious to kill the Jedi master Siolo Ur Manka. But Manka easily defeated Maul's surprise attack, using only a wooden staff. Having fled, Maul regrouped and constructs his new weapon. In the next fight Maul surprises Manka, stabbing him through the back with the second blade. Sidious encourages Maul to name the weapon. However, Maul does not want it to become anything more than an anonymous instrument of murder.

==== A Wookiee Scorned ====
Script: Jason Hall
Pencils: Christina Chen
Colors: Dan Jackson
10 Pages
Galactic Year: 4 ABY
Preceded by: Do or Do Not
Followed by: X-Wing: Rogue Leader

==== Free Memory ====
Script: Brett Matthews
Pencils: Vatche Mavlian
Colors: Michelle Madsen
10 Pages
Galactic Year: 4 ABY
Preceded by: A Day in the Life
Followed by: Lucky

=== Issue #11 ===
Star Wars Tales 11

Publication information
- Subject: Star Wars
- Genre: Science fiction
- Release date: 20 March 2002
- Country: United States
- Language: English
- No. of pages: 64

Creative team
- Cover artist: Killian Plunkett
- Designer: Lia Ribacchi
- Editor: Dave Land
- Assistant editor: Philip Simon
- Publisher: Mike Richardson

==== Prey ====
Story & Art: Kia Asamiya
Colors: Dave Stewart
22 Pages
Galactic Year: 1 BBY
Preceded by: The Princess Leia Diaries (pages 10–12)
Followed by: Underworld: The Yavin Vassilika

==== In the Beginning ====
Script: Garth Ennis
Pencils: Amanda Connor
Inks: Jimmy Palmiotti
Colors: Todd Broeker
6 Pages
Galactic Year: 3 BBY
Preceded by: The Flight of the Falcon
Followed by: Droids: The Kalarba Adventures

==== The Princess Leia Diaries ====
Script: Jason Hall
Pencils: Chris Brunner
Colors: Dave Nestelle
12 Pages
Galactic Year: 6-1 BBY
Preceded by: Being Boba Fett
Followed by: Outbid but Never Outgunned

==== Tall Tales ====
Script: Scott Allie
Pencils: Paul Lee & Brian Horton
Colors: Dave Stewart
8 Pages
Galactic Year: 11 ABY
Preceded by: The Other
Followed by: Jedi Academy: Leviathan

==== Ghost ====
Script: Jan Duursema
Pencils: Jan Duursema & Dave McCaig
8 Pages
Galactic Year: 12 BBY
Preceded by: Separated
Followed by: Fortune, Fate, and the Natural History of the Sarlacc

=== Issue #12 ===
Star Wars Tales 12

Publication information
- Subject: Star Wars
- Genre: Science fiction
- Release date: 5 June 2002
- Country: United States
- Language: English
- No. of pages: 64

Creative team
- Cover artist: John McCrea
- Designer: Lia Ribacchi
- Editor: Dave Land
- Assistant editor: Philip Simon
- Publisher: Mike Richardson

==== A Day in the Life ====
Script: Brett Matthews
Pencils: Adrian Sibar
Colors: Guy Major
12 Pages
Galactic Year: 4 ABY
Preceded by: Sand Blasted
Followed by: Free Memory

==== A Jedi's Weapon ====
Script: Henry Gilroy
Pencils: Manuel Garcia
Inks: Jimmy Palmiotti
Colors: Guy Major
12 Pages
Galactic Year: 24 BBY
Preceded by: The Sith in Shadow
Followed by: Starfighter: Crossbones

NOTE: Also given out as a Free Comic Book Day single

==== The Revenge of Tag and Bink ====
Script: Kevin Rubio
Pencils: Rick Zombo
Inks: Randy Emberlin
Colors: Dan Brown
10 Pages
Galactic Year: 4 ABY
Preceded by: Return of the Jedi
Followed by: The Return of Tag and Bink: Special Edition

==== Once Bitten ====
Script: C. B. Cebulski
Pencils: Makoto Nakatsuka
Colors: Dave Nestelle
10 Pages
Galactic Year: 36 BBY
Preceded by: Qui-Gon and Obi-Wan: The Aurorient Express
Followed by: Children of the Force

==== The Duty ====
Script: Christian Read
Pencils: John McCrea
Inks: Jimmy Palmiotti
Colors: Giulia Brusco
12 Pages
Galactic Year: 18 BBY
Preceded by: The Path to Nowhere
Followed by: The Value of Proper Intelligence to Any Successful Military Campaign is Not to be Underestimated

== Volume 4 ==
=== Issue #13 ===
Star Wars Tales 13

Publication information
- Subject: Star Wars
- Genre: Science fiction
- Release date: 25 September 2002
- Country: United States
- Language: English
- No. of pages: 64

Creative team
- Cover artist: Tim Bradstreet
- Designer: Lia Ribacchi
- Editor: Dave Land
- Assistant editor: Philip Simon
- Publisher: Mike Richardson

Mace Windu is featured in each story in this issue.

==== Puzzle Peace ====
Script: Scott Beatty
Pencils: Sanford Greene
Inks: Kris Kaufman
Colors: Dan Jackson
8 Pages
Galactic Year: 24 BBY
Preceded by: Starfighter: Crossbones
Followed by: Honor and Duty

==== The Secret of Tet Ami ====
Script: Fabian Nicieza
Pencils: Timothy II
Colors: Michelle Madsoen
10 Pages
Galactic Year: 43 BBY
Preceded by: Mythology
Followed by: Qui-Gon and Obi-Wan: The Aurorient Express

==== Survivors ====
Script: Jim Krueger
Pencils: Kagan McLeod
10 Pages
Galactic Year: 45 BBY
Preceded by: Stones
Followed by: Mythology

Mace Windu has tracked down Uda-Khalid, a known murderer, and has come to confront him. The story begins with Windu's approach to the fortress where he is. The path there is a narrow bridge across a deep ravine. While he is crossing it, two guards watch his approach, debating on whether or not he is a bounty hunter, and how he could have possibly found Uda-Khalid. As he crosses, he must battle high winds and "walk worms" (large worms that come out of the sides of the middle of the bridge). The sentries lose sight of him, only to find Windu standing right behind them. Before they fire on him, he mind-tricks them into believing that their job is to guard the walls from outside intruders, and that since he is inside the walls, he couldn't be a danger.

Windu enters the main audience hall to find Uda-Khalid waiting for him. He offers to double Windu's pay, believing he is a bounty hunter, to which Windu responds that he has been paid with the story of his crimes. Uda-Khalid says that he has left no evidence of his crimes, no survivors, no witnesses. We then see hundreds if not thousands of spirits of Uda-Khalid's victims filling the hall around the two. Windu reveals that he is a Jedi Knight and ignites his lightsaber. Khalid gloats that it has been a long time since he's killed a Jedi, and the duel begins, only to be ended swiftly with a stab to Uda-Khalid's heart.

==== Stones ====
Script: Haden Blackman
Pencils: Michael Zulli
Colors: Giulia Brusco
6 Pages
Galactic Year: 58 BBY
Preceded by: Vow of Justice
Followed by: Survivors

A young Padawan named Mace Windu was sent to Hurikane to negotiate with these beings and possibly obtain some of the crystals. After events went poorly, several of the native gave chase to Windu, resulting in Mace panicking and pushing them into a canyon. Having realized the error of his ways, the young Jedi apprentice healed the being's broken body by piecing it back together with the Force. In gratitude, Mace received some of the Hurrikaine crystals from the being's body, which he used to create his purple lightsaber blade.

==== The Sith in Shadow ====
Script: Bob Harris
Pencils: Jerome Opena
Colors: Dave Nestelle
10 Pages
Galactic Year: 27 BBY
Preceded by: Zam Wesell
Followed by: A Jedi's Weapon

==== Children of the Force ====
Script: Jason Hall
Pencils: Lucas Marangon
12 Pages
Galactic Year: 37 BBY
Preceded by: Once Bitten
Followed by: Qui-Gon and Obi-Wan: Last Stand on Ord Mantell

=== Issue #14 ===
Star Wars Tales 14

Publication information
- Subject: Star Wars
- Genre: Science fiction
- Release date: 11 December 2002
- Country: United States
- Language: English
- No. of pages: 64

Creative team
- Cover artist: Pat Lee
- Designer: Debra Bailey
- Editor: Dave Land
- Assistant editor: Philip Simon
- Publisher: Mike Richardson

==== Apocalypse Endor ====
Script: Christian Read
Pencils: Clayton Henry
Inks: Jimmy Palmiotti
Colors: Dan Jackson
10 Pages
Galactic Year: 19 ABY
Preceded by: The Secret Tales of Luke's Hand!
Followed by: Union

==== The Emperor's Court ====
Script: Jason Hall
Pencils: Ramon Bachs
Inks: Raul Fernandez
Colors: Dave Nestelle
8 Pages
This story is non-canon

==== Urchins ====
Story & Art: Stan Sakai
Colors: Tom Luth
8 Pages
Galactic Year: 33 BBY
Preceded by: Marked
Followed by: Jedi Council: Acts of War

==== Tides of Terror ====
Script: Milton Freewater Jr.
Pencils: Adriana Melo
Inks: Fabio Laguna
Colors: Chris Blythe
10 Pages
Galactic Year: 22 BBY
Preceded by: The Lesson
Followed by: Sacrifice

==== The Lesson ====
Script: Adam Gallardo
Pencils: Homs
Colors: Dan Jackson
6 Pages
Galactic Year: 22 BBY
Preceded by: Nobody's Perfect
Followed by: Tides of Terror

==== Smuggler's Blues ====
Story & Art: The Filbach Brothers
Colors: Jason Hvam
4 Pages
Galactic Year: 0 ABY
Preceded by: Trooper
Followed by: What Sin Loyalty?

==== Mythology ====
Script: Chris Eliopolous
Pencils: Jon Sommariva
Inks: Pierre-Andre Dery
Colors: Darrin Moore
10 Pages
Galactic Year: 44 BBY
Preceded by: Survivors
Followed by: The Secret of Tet Ami

=== Issue #15 ===
Star Wars Tales 15

Publication information
- Subject: Star Wars
- Genre: Science fiction
- Release date: 12 March 2003
- Country: United States
- Language: English
- No. of pages: 64

Creative team
- Cover artist: Leinil Francis Yu
- Designer: Debra Bailey
- Editor: Dave Land
- Assistant editor: Philip Simon
- Publisher: Mike Richardson

==== The Sandstorm ====
Script: Jason Hall
Pencils: Sunny Lee
Inks: Randy Emberlin
Colors: Digital Chameleon
12 Pages
Galactic Year: 8 BBY
Preceded by: Luke Skywalker: Detective
Followed by: Number Two in the Galaxy

While braving a Tatooine sandstorm and desert creatures including a Krayt dragon, a 10-year-old Luke gains an unlikely ally - "Annie", his father Anakin as a child.

==== First Impressions ====
Script: Nathan Walker
Pencils: Kilian Plunkett
Colors: Dave Nestelle
8 Pages
Galactic Year: 1 BBY
Preceded by: Boba Fett: Enemy of the Empire
Followed by: Crucible!

==== Falling Star ====
Script: Jim Beard
Pencils: Todd Nauck
Inks: Jamie Mendoza
Colors: Matthew Anthony
10 Pages
Galactic Year: 4 BBY
Preceded by: The Princess Leia Diaries (pages 8–9)
Followed by: Star Wars: Ewoks

A misadventure of childhood friends and future Rogue Squadron wingmen Luke and Biggs Darklighter that ensues when the two of them attempt to take off from Tatooine and experience space travel four years before they both fought in the Battle of Yavin.

==== Do or Do Not ====
Script: Jay Laird
Pencils: Timothy Il
Colors: James Mason
4 Pages
Galactic Year: 4 ABY
Preceded by: Lucky
Followed by: A Wookiee Scorned

==== Slippery Slope ====
Script: Scott Lobdell
Pencils: Sean Murphy
Colors: Dan Jackson
8 Pages
Galactic Year: 3 ABY
Preceded by: Hoth
Followed by: Thank the Maker

==== Lucky Stars ====
Script: Brian Augustyn
Pencils: Paco Medina
Inks: Joe Sanchez
Colors: Michelle Madsen
14 Pages
Galactic Year: 2 ABY
Preceded by: Planet of the Dead
Followed by: Junkheap Hero

Leia channels her inner femme fatale while teaming up with the Quetzal Sisters, a group of Rebel operatives who are already known as such, while intercepting a holocube on Elerion that contains Rebel base information before it can be sold to the Empire.

=== Issue #16 ===
Star Wars Tales 16

Publication information
- Subject: Star Wars
- Genre: Science fiction
- Release date: 25 June 2003
- Country: United States
- Language: English
- No. of pages: 64

Creative team
- Cover artist: Ashley Wood
- Designer: Debra Bailey
- Editor: Dave Land
- Assistant editor: Philip Simon
- Publisher: Mike Richardson

==== The Other ====
Script: Jason Hall
Pencils: John McCrea
Colors: Giulia Brusco
10 Pages
Galactic Year: 11 ABY
Preceded by: Hard Currency
Followed by: Tall Tales

==== Best Birthday Ever ====
Script: Tod C. Parkhill
Pencils & Colors: Joey Mason
Inks: Howard Shum
8 Pages
This story is non-canon

==== The Long, Bad Day ====
Script: Mike Denning
Pencils: Lucas Marangon
2 Pages
Galactic Year: 0 ABY
Preceded by: Day After the Death Star
Followed by: Sacrifice

==== Kessel Run ====
Story & Art: Gilbert Austin
18 Pages
This story is non-canon

==== Lunch Break ====
Story & Art: Jonathan Adams
6 Pages
Galactic Year: 2 ABY
Preceded by: The Hidden
Followed by: The Empire Strikes Back

==== Heart of Darkness ====
Script: Paul Lee
Pencils: Paul Lee & Brian Horton
12 Pages
Galactic Year: 700 BBY
Preceded by: Prototypes
Followed by: Yaddle's Tale: The One Below

== Volume 5 ==
=== Issue #17 ===
Star Wars Tales 17

Publication information
- Subject: Star Wars
- Genre: Science fiction
- Release date: 1 October 2003
- Country: United States
- Language: English
- No. of pages: 64

Creative team
- Cover artist: UDON
- Designer: Debra Bailey
- Editor: Dave Land
- Assistant editor: Philip Simon
- Publisher: Mike Richardson

==== Planet of the Dead ====
Script: Steve Niles
Pencils: Davidé Fabbri
Inks: Christian Dalla Vecchia
Colors: Sno Cone
12 Pages
Galactic Year: 1 ABY
Preceded by: Tilotny Throws a Shape
Followed by: Lucky Stars

In this possibly canon story, Han Solo and Chewbacca come into the possession of some valuable glowing Tandgor gems, that Solo claims will pay off debts and mod the Millennium Falcon. When the Falcon runs low on fuel they head for a small unnamed planet. Solo receives no lifesign readings, as if the whole planet's population disappeared. After making planet fall, Solo and Chewbacca step out of their ship and into the fog, only for the Corellian to be confronted and overwhelmed by groaning skeletal figures; The undead. After Chewbacca fights them off they beat a hasty retreat back to the Falcon but find the fuel line has been severed. It seems someone doesn't want them to leave. Arming themselves, the two-man crew of the Falcon head back out and come face to face with a local and her baby. She explains that the crew of a 'Great Interplanetary Ark' perished after their ship crashed in the planet's fog. They are compelled to wander the planet as corpses, terrorizing the locals every night. Using the Tandgor Gems to lay down lines, Han forms a makeshift runway that drives away the fog. A ghostly apparition of the ship that crashed long ago uses it to land, easing the spirits of the perished crew. The living dead would no longer terrorize the planets residents. Han and Chewie leave the planet out of pocket, but were rewarded with enough fuel to last them the rest of their journey.

==== All for You ====
Script: Adam Gallardo
Pencils: Greg Titus
Inks: Julian Washburn
Colors: John Rauch
10 Pages
Galactic Year: 996 BBY
Preceded by: Jedi vs. Sith
Followed by: The Apprentice

This story is set 996 years before the Battle of Yavin on the planet Ceriun, where a Jedi's ship crashes near a primitive agriculture village. Some of the adults go to inspect the crash, and the dying Jedi gives them a Sith holocron to keep safe until another Jedi can come to retrieve it. The younger generation of the village disagree with their hiding it, and want to take it to give it to any Sith that show up looking for it, so as to get on their good side and be taken as apprentices. Two of the older men are killed in a fight that breaks out, and comes to a halt with a Sith enters and takes the holocron. The boys confront him and tell him they did all of this for him, for the Sith, to prove themselves so he would take them with him. He ends up cutting one boy in half, and tells them the Sith take whatever they want without anyone else's help, and rides off on his speeder

==== Phantom Menaces ====
Script: Joe Casey
Pencils: Francisco Paronzini
Colors: Dave Nestelle
8 Pages
Galactic Year: 5 ABY
Preceded by: Mandatory Retirement
Followed by: Collapsing New Empires

==== Ghosts of Hoth ====
Script: Rob Williams
Pencils: Cary Nord
Colors: Sno Cone
8 Pages
Galactic Year: 2 ABY
Preceded by: Splinter of the Mind's Eye
Followed by: A Valentine's Story: Breaking the Ice

==== The Apprentice ====
Script: Mike Denning
Pencils: David Nakayama
Inks: Greg Adams
Colors: Peter Dawes
6 Pages
Galactic Year: 90-100 BBY
Preceded by: All for You
Followed by: Prototypes

The Sith Lord Finn and his apprentice are on an outlying world, having set off an explosion in a building. On their way back to their ship, they are stopped by Lod, a Toydarian who offers Finn Marka, his blue-haired Human slave girl. When Marka refuses to show Finn her teeth, he hits her, causing the apprentice to angrily yell at him to stop. When Lod tells Finn that he should keep a closer eye on his slave, the apprentice screams that he is not a slave, and kills Lod with his lightsaber.

Finn scolds the apprentice for showing compassion, a Jedi trait, and Marka asks to be taken with them, using a mind trick on the apprentice. Finn says that he has no need for a slave and already has an apprentice, and the two Sith leave, heading back to their ship. Finn orders the apprentice to deal with Marka as he heads to the top of the building their landing pad is on. A few minutes later the apprentice returns with Marka in tow, having been unable to kill her. Finn once more tells Marka that he already has an apprentice.

In response, Marka uses the Force to snatch the apprentice's lightsaber, then pushes him off the building to his death. Finn's only response is to ask Marka if she is coming or not.

==== Dark Journey ====
Script: Jason Hall
Pencils: Ben Templesmith
12 Pages
Galactic Year: 22 BBY
Preceded by: Another Fine Mess
Followed by: Double Blind

During the Clone Wars, the Jedi Vydel Dir'Nul has ignored the call of the Jedi Council to take up a position as general. Instead, she tracks a serial killer called Kardem as vengeance for the murder of her lover, the freighter pilot Ash B'risko. Since Ash, Kardem has killed only female Twi'leks, but more disturbing is his means of killing: lightsaber and Force lightning, indicating that he is a dark Jedi. As she finds Kardem's eighth victim after following his trail of hints, a hooded figure approaches her and calls her name. They fight, but the figure disarms her and tells her he has come to take her back to the Jedi Council, but she retaliates with Force lightning. As he calls the name of Master Dir'Nul, she responds that her name is Kardem. The Jedi reveals that Dir'Nul is Kardem. She discovered Ash with a Twi'lek dancing girl, and in her rage killed him, creating the dark side mental persona of Kardem in the process. From then on, she killed female Twi'leks in the Kardem persona, then investigated the murders in the Dir'Nul persona. The Jedi tells her that he was sent to bring her back, dead or alive. Calling upon the dark side, Kardem kills him with lightning and his lightsaber. She then reverts to the Dir'Nul persona and is shocked to find that "Kardem" has claimed yet another victim, this time a Jedi. She reaffirms her vow to bring the killer to justice.

=== Issue #18 ===
Star Wars Tales 18

Publication information
- Subject: Star Wars
- Genre: Science fiction
- Release date: 24 December 2003
- Country: United States
- Language: English
- No. of pages: 64

Creative team
- Cover artist: Cam Kennedy
- Designer: Debra Bailey
- Editor: Dave Land
- Assistant editor: Katie Moody
- Publisher: Mike Richardson

==== Number Two in the Galaxy ====
Script: Henry Gilroy
Pencils: Todd Demong
Colors: Jim Campbell
10 Pages
Galactic Year: 7 BBY
Preceded by: The Sandstorm
Followed by: Payback

Boba Fett comes to get his armor repaired on the remote planet of Ma'ar Shaddam. While he is not wearing it, a group of bounty hunters attempt to kill him. Dressed only in a robe, he tricks some of the hunters into killing each other. He kills another barehanded and steals the dead being's blade. The ringleader of the hunters steals Fett's Mandalorian armor and Slave I. Using the ship's cannons, he blasts the facility that Fett is in. Believing he killed Fett, he goes to a nearby cantina, impersonating him. Fett comes in wearing Jango's old armor and takes his armor back, but leaves the impersonator alive to remember who is number one.

==== Payback ====
Script: Andy Diggle
Pencils: Henry Flint
Colors: Chris Blythe
8 Pages
Galactic Year: 7 BBY
Preceded by: Number Two in the Galaxy
Followed by: Being Boba Fett

Boba Fett takes a job from Drex, a crime lord in the Gallapraxis system. It is his job to get Feleen Bantillian, dead or alive, for the fee of 50,000. Drex tells him that Bantillian had killed his son. Fett tracks him to an abandoned droid plant on Vornax, and gives him a chance to surrender. Bantillian tells Fett that he is Drex's son, and that Fett killed his brother. Drex set up Fett. Fett fires at Bantillian, who blocks the blast with an old droideka shield. Bantillian closes the roof of the area they are in. Dozens of old droids stagger towards Fett, trying to kill him. A war droid shoots him out of the sky, damaging his jetpack. Fett destroys the droid. Fett then shoots a tank of machine oil, setting Bantillian afire. The being jumps into a deep pool of water, only belatedly realizing that he cannot swim. He calls for his droids to help and all of them sink to the bottom. Fett goes back to an astonished Drex, who pays Fett reluctantly. Fett gives Drex Bantillian's head, with a thermal detonator in the mouth. As Fett leaves he mutters, "Payback doesn't pay."

==== Being Boba Fett ====
Script: Jason Hall
Pencils: Stewart McKenny
Inks: John Wycough
Colors: Dave Nestelle
12 Pages
Galactic Year: 6 BBY
Preceded by: Payback
Followed by: The Princess Leia Diaries

The story begins with Boba Fett waking up in his home. After looking in the mirror and seeing his father's face, Boba looks for his daily bounty. After passing up escaped Wookiee slaves and high-ranking Imperial defectors, he settles for a dead-or-alive bounty named Bendu Fry. He goes into the cantina, where Fry is telling a joke to two women. As he says the punch line, Fett approaches. Fry tries to run, but Fett easily catches the fat Devaronian. To save his life, Bendu tells Fett of a Twi'lek Jedi Knight who is living on the planet. Fett leaves to track the Jedi down, and seems to locate his target. It turns out, however, the Twi'lek is not the Jedi after all, but the Jedi's son. The boy's father was killed at the Battle of Geonosis. Fett allows the boy to live and returns to cantina, disintegrating Bendu and getting his bounty.

==== Way of the Warrior ====
Script: Peter Alilunas
Pencils: Will Conrad
10 Pages
Galactic Year: 23 BBY
Preceded by: Honor and Duty
Followed by: The Eyes of Revolution

On the planet Kuat a year prior to the Battle Of Geonosis, a lone cloaked figure wanders into a small colony. When the leader of the colonists, Larbo emerges to see what is happening, the young Boba Fett hurls a thermal detonator and flees into one of the tents. As Chaos ensues Jango Fett arrives to slaughter the scattered prey. When approached by two gun men, a flick Knife appears from his gauntlet and, presumably, slits their throats. He then hunts down the other Colonists. Larbo finds Boba cowering in the corner of his tent and holds him at gunpoint to interrogate him. He is horrified to learn the young boy is the bounty hunters son. Jango, having finished assassinating the remaining members of the camp tracks down Boba and demands Larbo releases his son and slashes his way through the tents canopy. A disgusted Larbo asks what kind of man would use his own son a bait, and Boba replies "Only a son can know his father's heart". Jango seizes Boba and throws a Thermal Detonator into the tent before escaping with the boy. Jango and Boba leave the planet in Slave I, and the Bounty Hunter confirms to Count Dooku that his mission was accomplished. The Ruling Families can now commence with building factories for the Trade Federation and the Sith Lords other allies. On Boba's first training mission he learns an important lesson - that a warrior must suppress all emotion to succeed.

==== Revenants ====
Script: W. Haden Blackman
Pencils: Dub with Niko Henrichon
Inks: Pierre-André Déry
Colors: Phiz
16 Pages
Galactic Year: 25 ABY
Preceded by: Chewbacca
Followed by: Equals and Opposites

Several months after Chewbacca's death, Han Solo has been convinced by his wife and Lando Calrissian to stop moping and go on a reconnaissance mission on the other side of the galaxy from Vector Prime. Near Raxus Prime, Han's shuttle encounters Slave I and is shot down onto the junkyard moon. Keeping a log on his datapad for Leia, Han spends the next few weeks trekking across the moon, making makeshift weapons and survival gear to avoid Boba Fett, who is hunting him. Han finally comes to the realization that there is more than one Fett following him. When that happens, he comes face to face with the real Fett. Fett reveals to Han that the entire event has been a training exercise to cull the weak recruits from the new batch of Mandalorian Protectors prior to them taking up service for the Yuuzhan Vong - since, as mercenaries, the Mandalorians go for the highest bidder, and the Yuuzhan Vong are currently the richest ones in the galaxy. The Mandalorians then take off, leaving Han behind.

=== Issue #19 ===
Star Wars Tales 19

Publication information
- Subject: Star Wars
- Genre: Science fiction
- Release date: 14 April 2004
- Country: United States
- Language: English
- No. of pages: 64

Creative team
- Cover artist: Andrew Robinson
- Designer: Debra Bailey
- Editor: Dave Land
- Assistant editor: Philip Simon
- Publisher: Mike Richardson

==== Collapsing New Empires ====
Script: Jim Pascoe
Pencils: Ramon Bachs
Inks: Kris Justice
Colors: Tom Smith
10 Pages
Galactic Year: 6 ABY
Preceded by: Phantom Menaces
Followed by: Dark Forces: Rebel Agent

==== The Value of Proper Intelligence to Any Successful Military Campaign is Not to be Underestimated ====
Script: Ken Lizzi
Pencils: Lucas Marangon
2 Pages
Galactic Year: 18-5 BBY
Preceded by: The Duty
Followed by: The Destroyer

On the planet Gibbela, an agricultural planet well off any trade routes, a small Imperial contingent arrives to take control on the planet, demanding surrender from the first inhabitant they meet, a short, unassuming farmer. Much to their surprise, it transforms into a gigantic clawed beast and kills them all. The creature shrinks back to its original size and continues its fieldwork, using the remaining armor and weapons of the deceased Imperials as farm equipment.

==== Rather Darkness Visible ====
Script: Jeremy Barlow
Pencils: Greg Tocchini
Inks: Eddie Wagner
Colors: Michael Atiyeh
10 Pages
Galactic Year: 21 BBY
Preceded by: Honor Bound
Followed by: The Battle of Jabiim

On Katanos VII, Jedi Knight Lunis and his Padawan Obs Kaj investigate intelligence that the miners of the planet are performing illegal cloning experiments. Obs Kaj has grown disillusioned with the state of affairs in the Republic and secretly plans to leave the Jedi Order after the mission. However, when they arrive, they discover that they have walked into an ambush. The miners reveal that as profits from the cortosis mines declined, they looked to the Galactic Senate for support, but were spurned, and they began cloning operations to earn the necessary income. Their cloning attempts failed, and eventually they turned to the Confederacy of Independent Systems when they learned about the bounties that had been placed on Jedi. As the miners attack the Jedi, Obs Kaj feels cut off in the Force from her Master, a result of her distancing herself. Lunis eventually falls and Kaj flees, escaping in a short-range shuttlepod. As she leaves the planet's surface, broadcasting a distress call, a ship makes contact with her. When it approaches, she realizes it is in fact Count Dooku, who promptly fires upon her, blowing her craft from the sky. When Dooku later makes contact with the miners, he says he will only pay for the death of Lunis, half of what they expected and not enough to keep the mines afloat.

==== The Rebel Club ====
Story & Art: Scott Kurtz
Colors: Jim Zubkavich
8 Pages
This story is non-canon

==== The Lost Lightsaber ====
Script: Andrew Robinson & Jim Royal
Pencils: Núria Peris
Inks: Kris Justice
Colors: Tom Smith
8 Pages
Galactic Year: 40 ABY
Preceded by: Equals and Opposites
Followed by: Broken

==== Into the Great Unknown ====
Script: Haden Blackman
Pencils: Sean Murphy
Colors: Dan Jackson
10 Pages
This story is non-canon

Han Solo and Chewbacca are aboard the Millennium Falcon when they are attacked by Imperials. They are forced to leap to hyperspace blind and end up in our Solar System, where they crash on Earth's Pacific Northwest. Believing they are on Endor due to the large trees, they venture out to investigate, but Han is killed by Native Americans. The mourning Chewbacca leaves the Falcon to live in the trees, where the natives believe him to be a sasquatch. One hundred and twenty-six years later, the wreckage of the Falcon and Han's remains are found by the intrepid American archaeologist Indiana Jones and his sidekick, Short Round. Indy, spooked by how "eerily familiar" the remains are, decides to leave them in peace.

==== Storyteller ====
Script: Jason Hall
Pencils: Paul Lee
8 Pages
Galactic Year: Long after the Battle of Yavin
Preceded by: Trust Issues

Sometime long after the Battle of Yavin, the wicked Vindar have forced their neighboring race into slavery and rule them with an iron fist. The Vindar have tortured, burned, and killed many members of the other race, thus breaking the spirits of most of the race's people—but not that of Otalp. Since he was young, his den-mother told him of the mysterious "Oracle" she saw in one of her visions. The Oracle is said to tell tales of the past to give hope for the future. Otalp's den-brother, Remoh, disagrees with this, but only travels with Otalp to escape the misery of their eternal slavery.

When they reach the cave where The Oracle is fabled to live, Remoh repeats the classic line. As they enter the cave, they come across a certain protocol droid sputtering about a tragedy that occurred when he was last deactivated. The droid says strange words, like "Ar-Too" and "Master Luke", which confuses the brothers. As soon he starts talking in an understandable language, Otalp requests a story from him. Though the droid admits to being not that good a storyteller, he decides, because Otalp and Remoh came so far, to tell them the best story he knows. The story of young boy from a desolate planet who redeemed a darkened soul and freed the galaxy from the clutches of the ultimate evil using a mythical tool known as a "lightsaber". As the droid tells this story, the two brothers imagine it all as though it were their own kind who was fighting the fights.

Just after the storyteller has concluded his tale, the Vindar blasts his head off. While Remoh hides, Otalp claims that he came alone. The Vindar kills him and leave to attend other matters. As Remoh gazes over the petrified corpse of his brother, he notices an oddly shaped metal rod poking out of the storyteller's severed torso chest. Remoh notices it has a button and pushes it. A glowing, green blade appears from the rod. Realization dawning on him, he starts to think of a way to free his desolate planet from the clutches of their ultimate evil.

=== Issue #20 ===
Star Wars Tales 20

Publication information
- Subject: Star Wars
- Genre: Science fiction
- Release date: 30 June 2004
- Country: United States
- Language: English
- No. of pages: 64

Creative team
- Cover artist: Tony Millionaire
- Designer: Debra Bailey
- Editor: Dave Land
- Assistant editor: Katie Moody
- Publisher: Mike Richardson

==== George R. Binks ====
Story & Art: Tony Millionaire
Colors: Jim Campbell
10 Pages
Galactic Year: 45 BBY
Preceded by: Lil' Maul in: Hate Leads to Lollipops
Followed by: Mythology

On the seas of Naboo, George R. Binks of the Binks & Son Whaling Company attempts to take down a whale. However, the irresponsibility and clumsiness of his son Jar Jar causes their ship to founder and the Binkses to be marooned on a deserted island. A month goes by, and George is driven to madness by his son's follies. When Jar Jar proposes to swim for the mainland, George eagerly agrees, knowing that he will likely not make it. However, his wife intervenes. George, unable to take any more, decides to shoot himself. When his wife tries to stop him by asking him to "Think of our son!", he pulls the trigger, which grazes his skull. As he lies there he reminisces of his love Sheebla, and how he chose not to marry her because she could not bear him the son he wanted. As he imagines seeing Sheebla standing before him, the hallucination clears to reveal that it is really Jar Jar with an octopus wrapped around his head. George's only response is crushing despair.

==== Who's Your Daddy ====
Story & Art: Jason
Colors: Paul Hornschemeier
1 Page
This story is non-canon

==== Fred Jawa ====
Story & Art: Bob Fingerman
6 Pages
This story is non-canon

==== Luke Skywalker: Detective ====
Story & Art: Rick Geary
Colors: Sno Cone
12 Pages
Galactic Year: 8 BBY
Preceded by: Nerf Herder
Followed by: The Sandstorm

==== Hunger Pains ====
Story & Art: Jim Campbell
2 Pages
Galactic Year: 3 ABY
Preceded by: Thank the Maker
Followed by: Blind Fury

==== Failing Up With Jar Jar Binks ====
Story & Art: Peter Bagge
7 Pages
This story is non-canon

==== Nobody's Perfect ====
Story & Art: Peter Bagge
1 Page
Galactic Year: 22 BBY
Preceded by: Tag and Bink: Revenge of the Clone Menace
Followed by: The Lesson

==== Problem Solvers ====
Story & Art: Chris Eliopoulos
4 Pages
Galactic Year: 6 ABY
Preceded by: Boba Fett: Twin Engines of Destruction
Followed by: Lando's Commandos: On Eagle's Wings

==== Melvin Fett ====
Story & Art: James Kochalka
4 Pages
This story is non-canon

Melvin Fett, cousin of the infamous Boba Fett, travels to the "desert" planet of Tatooine seeking the bounty on Jar Jar Binks, hoping to finally gain respect from other bounty hunters. As he walks under the boiling twin suns in the Tatooine dunes, he hears Jar Jar, but because he is unable to see because of the sweat stinging his eyes, he doesn't notice that it is just a Jawa drinking out of a Jar Jar Binks Commemorative Drinking Cup with flexible straw and "talking action". As he pulls out his blaster, he trips on a rock and the blaster flies out of his hands and knocks out the Jawa. Grabbing the cup, he praises himself by the capture, thinking the other bounty hunters will never laugh at him ever again.

==== Young Lando Calrissian ====
Story & Art: Gilbert Hernandez
Colors: Michelle Madsen
8 Pages
Galactic Year: 5 BBY
Preceded by: Routine
Followed by: Falling Star

== Volume 6 ==
=== Issue #21 ===
Star Wars Tales 21

Publication information
- Publishing company: Dark Horse Comics
- Subject: Star Wars
- Genre: Science fiction
- Release date: 20 October 2004
- Country: United States
- Language: English
- No. of pages: 64

Creative team
- Cover artist: Lee Bermejo
- Designer: Richard E. Jones
- Editor: Jeremy Barlow
- Publisher: Mike Richardson

==== Nomad, Chapter one ====
Script: Rob Williams
Pencils: Brandon Badeaux
Colors: Dan Jackson
22 Pages
Galactic Year: 32 BBY
Preceded by: Force Fiction
Followed by: Nomad, Chapter two

A ship on a mission to return the deadly prisoner called Lycan to Coruscant crashes on the lands of Darca Nyl and he finds a dying Jedi Knight in the wreckage. The Jedi tells him of Lycan and gives Nyl his lightsaber. Nyl rushes back home and finds his son slain by Lycan, which causes Darca to pursue him.

Darca Nyl's pursuit leads him to an uninhospitable, colonized planet in the Outer Rim rich with ore, where he soon meets Samuel, the owner of the planet's mining facility. Samuel mistakes the lightsaber-wielding Nyl for a Jedi after he ends a conflict between Samuel's men and a boy accused of conspiring in the kidnapping of Samuel's daughter Leddar. Samuel reveals that Lycan has already left the planet a week earlier on a supply ship, but he asks Nyl to help return his daughter before he tells him Lycan's destination. Darca Nyl accepts the deal and ventures with Samuel outside the facility in protective suits to find Ledd. After a brief fight they managed to disarm the kidnapper and rescue Leddar. Samuel finally reveals that Lycan was heading for Molavar.

==== Walking the Path that's Given ====
Script: Shane McCarthy & Thomas Andrews
Pencils: Michel Lacombe
Inks: Serge LaPointe
Colors: SnoCone Studios
17 Pages
Galactic Year: 0 ABY
Preceded by: As Long as We Live Forever
Followed by: Vader's Quest

==== Equals and Opposites ====
Script: Nathan P. Butler
Pencils: James Raiz
Colors: Michael Atiyeh
14 Pages
Galactic Year: 28 ABY
Preceded by: Revenants
Followed by: The Lost Lightsaber

=== Issue #22 ===
Star Wars Tales 22

Publication information
- Publishing company: Dark Horse Comics
- Subject: Star Wars
- Genre: Science fiction
- Release date: 23 February 2005
- Country: United States
- Language: English
- No. of pages: 64

Creative team
- Cover artist: Lee Bermejo
- Designers: Richard E. Jones & Dave Nestelle
- Editor: Jeremy Barlow
- Publisher: Mike Richardson

==== Honor Bound ====
Script: Ian Edginton
Pencils: Steve Pugh
Colors: Michael Atiyeh
22 Pages
Galactic Year: 21 BBY
Preceded by: Jedi: Dooku
Followed by: Rather Darkness Visible

==== Nomad, Chapter two ====
Script: Rob Williams
Pencils: Brandon Badeaux
Colors: Dan Jackson
18 Pages
Galactic Year: 32 BBY
Preceded by: Nomad, Chapter one
Followed by: Nomad, Chapter three

Darca Nyl's pursuit is interrupted when the crew of the ship he is on turns against him. He manages to take care of them, but the ship crashes on an unknown planet. He soon meets a woman named Jaren and her brother Ament who he rescues from a man on a speeder bike. The siblings lie about their reason of being chased, but they tell Nyl he can find a freighter in their hometown. The following night Nyl's emotional difficulties finally catch up with him when Jaren shows him a trick: An image of his son in a campfire. Upon seeing the image he is compelled to face his feelings of guilt and rage. The next day, Ament leaves and doesn't return. Darca, while searching for Ament, finds a bear-like creature that attacks him. He ends up killing the creature with the lightsaber, but runs back to the campfire when he hears Jaren scream. Ament had returned and was killing a similar bear-like creature that threatened Jaren's life. It turned out that Ament was a murderer and that Jaren had helped him escape from prison. Ament suffered of guilty conscience and Darca Nyl took him and Jaren to the bikers who were chasing them earlier, who were able to show Nyl where he could get a ride to Molavar.

==== Marooned ====
Story & Art: Lucas Marangon
14 Pages
Galactic Year: 5 ABY
Preceded by: Mara Jade: A Night on the Town
Followed by: Three Against the Galaxy

=== Issue #23 ===
Star Wars Tales 23

Publication information
- Publishing company: Dark Horse Comics
- Subject: Star Wars
- Genre: Science fiction
- Release date: 11 May 2005
- Country: United States
- Language: English
- No. of pages: 64

Creative team
- Cover artists: Brandon Badeaux & Brad Anderson
- Designers: Richard E. Jones & Joshua Elliott
- Editor: Jeremy Barlow
- Publisher: Mike Richardson

==== Shadows and Light ====
Script: Joshua Ortega
Art: Dustin Weaver
Colors: Michael Atiyeh
Letters: Michael Heisler
Galactic Year: 3,993 BBY
Preceded by: The Sith War
Followed by: Unseen, Unheard

==== Nomad, Chapter three ====
Script: Rob Williams
Pencils: Brandon Badeaux
Colors: Dan Jackson
18 Pages
Galactic Year: 32 BBY
Preceded by: Nomad, Chapter two
Followed by: Nomad, Chapter four

On Molavar Darca Nyl continues his pursuit of Lycan, who had wreaked havoc in a local casino. Lycan had taken a ship of one of the people he killed in the casino and landed in the middle of the desert and in order to reach it Nyl joins a convoy led by a Molavaran called Tooth.

Four days later Tooth's convoy finds Lycan's ship, and Darca leaves to pursue on his own. He is soon found by a moisture farmer named Byrom, whose wife has just encountered Lycan in the desert. Byrom is troubled by a Molavaran gangster named Sleeth, whose mother is the reigning crime-lady of Malcraan. When Sleeth arrives to ask for protection money, Nyl chases them away and humiliates Sleeth. Darca wants to help defend Byrom, but Byrom insists that he continue his search for Lycan. Nyl leaves, and soon Sleeth's mother arrives to exact revenge. However, Darca returns with Tooth's convoy and Tooth forms an alliance with Byrom against Sleeth's mother. Darca leaves again in a borrowed landspeeder to pursue Lycan.

==== Lucky ====
Script: Rob Williams
Pencils: Michel Lacombe
Inks: Serge LaPointe & Andrew Pepoy
Colors: Wil Glass
14 Pages
Galactic Year: 4 ABY
Preceded by: Free Memory
Followed by: Do or Do Not

=== Issue #24 ===
Star Wars Tales 24

Publication information
- Publishing company: Dark Horse Comics
- Subject: Star Wars
- Genre: Science fiction
- Release date: 13 July 2005
- Country: United States
- Language: English
- No. of pages: 64

Creative team
- Cover artist: Brandon Badeaux
- Designers: Richard E. Jones & Joshua Elliott
- Editor: Jeremy Barlow
- Assistant editor: Dave Marshall
- Publisher: Mike Richardson

==== Marked ====
Script: Rob Williams
Pencils: Cully Hamner
Colors: Wil Glass
12 Pages
Galactic Year: 33 BBY
Preceded by: Nameless
Followed by: Urchins

Darth Sidious sends Darth Maul on a mission to eliminate a certain disturbance in the Force. Sidious informs Maul that the phenomenon threatens to wake the Jedi from their complacency and inability to sense the return of the Sith.

Maul tracks his quarry to a cantina on a planet in the Outer Rim. The disturbance is in the form of a Drovian brute called Silus, who is extremely strong in the dark side of the Force. Silus is a champion competitor in a fighting sport that involves use of the Force, and the winning of credits.

When Maul enters, an Aleena called Tabor engages Silus in combat. Tabor is no match for him, and dies quickly.

Maul confronts Silus, and opens a holocommunication channel to his master. Through the holo, Sidious offers Silus an opportunity to become his new apprentice: by giving him a chance to kill Darth Maul. Maul is confused by his Master's apparent betrayal, and turns to great anger. He kills Silus without much effort. Maul later realizes that it was merely a test of his own strength, and a lesson demonstrating that in fear there is power.

Throughout the story, Maul experiences some minor flashbacks. The flashbacks reveal that Maul had plain red skin as a child, and that his Sith tattoos were applied by none other than Darth Sidious himself.

==== Fett Club ====
Script: Kevin Rubio
Pencils: Roger Langridge
Colors: Wil Glass
11 Pages
This story is non-canon

==== Unseen, Unheard ====
Script: Chris Avellone
Pencils: Dustin Weaver
6 Pages
Galactic Year: 3,952 BBY
Preceded by: Shadows and Light
Followed by: Redemption
It is 4,000 years before the rise of the Galactic Empire. In the Mid Rim colony of Katarr a Miraluka (Visas Marr) female sits peacefully and gazes at the beauty of her world through the Force, unaware that her people have less than an hour left to live. Unbeknownst to them, their Force-sensitive race has attracted the attention of an unusual Sith Lord (Darth Nihilus), one who sustains himself through death in the Force. The Devastation of Katarr by way of the Sith Lord's considerable Force powers sends an echo, through the Force, of the screams of countless lives in which the female Miraluka sees the death of all living things on her world. Unconscious and near death herself, the Miraluka is taken aboard the Ravager, a seemingly destroyed ship of the Sith Lord, where she is healed of her injuries. Upon awakening, the Miraluka does not know where she is or why she has been spared. Seeking out the Sith Lord, she suddenly becomes aware that the answer to her question is that the Sith Lord wants her people, at last, to see.

==== Nomad, Chapter four ====
Script: Rob Williams
Pencils: Brandon Badeaux
Colors: Dan Jackson
24 Pages
Galactic Year: 32 BBY
Preceded by: Nomad, Chapter three
Followed by: Emissaries to Malastare

== See also ==
- Star Wars Infinities
- Star Wars: Visionaries
