= Star Wars: Shadows of the Empire =

1996 multimedia project created by Lucasfilm

- Author: George Lucas (characters); Steve Perry (novel); John Wagner (comic)
- Language: English
- Series: Canon C
- Subject: Star Wars
- Genre: Science fiction
- Publisher: Nintendo, LucasArts (video game); Bantam Books (novel); Dark Horse Comics (comic)
- Publication date: 1996
- Publication place: United States
- Media type: Paperback, Computer and video games: Nintendo 64, Windows
- Followed by: The Mandalorian Armor

Star Wars: Shadows of the Empire is a 1996 multimedia project created by Lucasfilm. The idea was to create a story set between the films The Empire Strikes Back and Return of the Jedi, and to explore all commercial possibilities of a full motion picture release without actually making a film. The venture was intended to reinvigorate interest in the franchise ahead of the theatrical Special Editions of the Star Wars trilogy released the following year.

Several products were released, including a novel, a junior novelization, a comic book series, a video game, a soundtrack, trading cards, role-playing games, posters, model kits, Micro Machines toys, statuettes, vinyl dolls, and a series of action figures and vehicles. The story introduces Rebel ally Dash Rendar, who aids the heroes in their attempt to liberate the frozen Han Solo from bounty hunter Boba Fett. Meanwhile, Darth Vader continues the search for his son, Luke Skywalker, whom crime lord Prince Xizor attempts to kill in his plot to replace Vader at the side of Emperor Palpatine.

== Background ==
In 1994, Lucasfilm publishing director Lucy Autrey Wilson met with Bantam editor Lou Aronica to discuss future publications, and Aronica suggested a Star Wars crossover multimedia event. Later in the year, Lucasfilm met with franchise licensees, including LucasArts representatives and author Steve Perry to discuss the multimedia project, intended to feature the media and marketing elements of a film release without actually producing a movie. This was largely meant to reinvigorate the franchise ahead of the prequel trilogy, along with George Lucas's 1997 Special Editions of the original trilogy. Lucasfilm producers originally wanted the project to focus on the main characters between the original Star Wars film (Note: Later titled Star Wars: Episode IV – A New Hope) and The Empire Strikes Back, but Dark Forces game designer Jon Knoles suggested that it take place between the latter film and Return of the Jedi (an era explored by no other Star Wars novel).

Shadows of the Empire
- Author: Steve Perry
- Cover artist: Drew Struzan
- Language: English
- Subject: Star Wars
- Genre: Science fiction
- Publisher: Bantam Spectra
- Publication date: Hardcover: 1 April 1996; Paperback: 3 March 1997
- Publication place: United States
- Pages: Hardcover: 340; Paperback: 416
- ISBN: 0-553-10089-0

== Novel ==
Princess Leia, Chewbacca, and Lando Calrissian hire Battle of Hoth veteran Dash Rendar, who has located Boba Fett's ship, which has the frozen Han Solo aboard. The heroes lead an attempt to liberate Han from the bounty hunter, but are outgunned by Imperial TIE fighters. Back on Tatooine, Luke Skywalker constructs a new lightsaber; he is chased by swoop bike riders working for Jabba the Hutt and is saved by Dash. Luke leads Dash and a group of Bothan pilots to intercept Imperial plans for a second Death Star; they bring these to Kothlis to be decoded. Luke is briefly captured by the agents of Darth Vader and learns of Prince Xizor, a Falleen who is the leader of powerful crime syndicate Black Sun. Xizor plans to kill Luke in a plot to gain the Emperor's favor. Seeking information on the attempts on Luke's life, Leia and Chewbacca go to Rodia to meet Xizor's human-replica droid, Guri, who takes them to Coruscant. There, Xizor tries to seduce the princess in an attempt to bait Luke. Meanwhile, Luke, Lando and Dash sneak into the crime lord's palace to save Leia. As the Rebels engage Imperial fighters above Coruscant, Xizor is prevented from escaping by the vengeful Vader, whose Star Destroyer shoots down his repulsor craft and Skyhook base. The debris from the explosion hits the Outrider, apparently killing Dash. (Note: Dash's fate is briefly explored in the sequel comic, Shadows of the Empire: Evolution.) Back on Tatooine once more, Luke records a holographic message for Jabba the Hutt.

Author Steve Perry was commissioned to write the novel—the backbone of the multimedia project—after writing the novelizations of The Mask for Bantam, and Aliens based upon graphic novels by Dark Horse Comics, which had been licensed by Lucasfilm to create Star Wars comics. In addition to studying the original Star Wars trilogy, Perry read the first spin-off novel in the franchise, Splinter of the Mind's Eye, to get an idea of how to write for Vader. The publishers wanted a 'substitute' for the incapacitated Han Solo, and Perry came up with the character of Dash, noted by fans as being mainly a vehicle for Solo-esque dialogue. The publishers also instructed Perry to make Xizor's attempt to seduce Leia successful, but the author refused as he feared fan backlash.

Steve Perry has expressed his support of adapting the story as an animated film. A prequel novel was planned, to be written by author Charles Grant, but was cancelled due to a Lucasfilm Licensing move from Bantam to Del Rey Books.

== Comics ==
The six-issue comic book series was written by John Wagner and illustrated by Kilian Plunkett; Steve Perry was a story consultant. It focuses on Boba Fett and his fellow bounty hunters (first seen briefly in The Empire Strikes Back) as well as Jix, a hireling of Darth Vader who infiltrates Jabba the Hutt's gang of bikers (led by Gizman) to prevent their attempt to kill Luke Skywalker.

Cover of Shadows of the Empire: Evolution

Excerpts from the comic were published in Nintendo Power magazine. Two separate mini-comics were released with Micro Machines toys (with three alternative covers) and Ertl model kits. (Note: The Galoob and Ertl comics were reprinted in Star Wars Omnibus: Wild Space – Volume 1.) A pop-up comic was also made, entitled Battle of the Bounty Hunters. A one-shot comic titled The Jabba Tape also features Gizman around the time of Return of the Jedi and was illustrated by Plunkett.

=== Sequel ===
A sequel comic was written, centered around Guri and titled Shadows of the Empire: Evolution. The five-issue series was later collected in a trade paperback. It was written by Steve Perry, and was his first foray into comics. The art was created by Ron Randall (pencils), P. Craig Russell (ink), and Dave Nestelle (color).

Soon after the events of Return of the Jedi, Guri is left wondering what her future will hold now that she no longer has a master. During the ongoing struggle for supremacy in the underworld, she endeavors to discover her human side—if it exists. But in her quest to alter her programming and gain humanity, Guri is pursued by both bounty hunters and Rebels led by Luke Skywalker. Secrets lying in her android mind make her a valuable asset.

== Video game ==
LucasArts's Shadows of the Empire was developed as a collaboration with Nintendo, and is one of the first games available for the Nintendo 64, and a port was released later for Windows. The best known product in the Shadows of the Empire line, the game was first released in December 1996 as an exclusive N64 title five months after the console's launch. The PC version came nearly a year later, in September 1997. In the game, players control mercenary Dash Rendar in four missions:

- Part I – Dash Rendar is drawn into the Battle of Hoth.
- Part II – Dash confronts bounty hunter IG-88, who leads him to Boba Fett.
- Part III – Dash saves Luke Skywalker's life by fighting a gang of swoop bikers in Mos Eisley, then helps Luke recover plans for the second Death Star.
- Part IV – Dash, with Luke and Lando Calrissian, travels to Coruscant to rescue Princess Leia from Prince Xizor's stronghold.

The PC version has full-motion cinematic cutscenes with sound effects and voices, while the N64 version utilizes artwork with subtitles at the bottom of the screen due to technical limitations.

== Soundtrack ==
Star Wars: Shadows of the Empire

Soundtrack album to the novel Star Wars: Shadows of the Empire by Joel McNeely
- Released: April 23, 1996
- Recorded: City Hall; Glasgow, 1996
- Genre: Classical
- Length: 51:27
- Label: Varèse Sarabande
- Producer: Robert Townson

Soundtrack
Review scores
Source	Rating
Allmusic	link
SoundtrackNet	link
FilmTracks	link
Soundtrack-Express	link
iTunes	link

Lucasfilm commissioned Varèse Sarabande Records to publish a score. Producer Robert Townson selected Joel McNeely to compose it; both had produced music for The Young Indiana Jones Chronicles. The soundtrack was performed by the Royal Scottish National Orchestra and Chorus. Themes from the movies can be heard in tracks one (the main theme from Star Wars and "Carbon Freeze") and eight ("The Imperial March" and "The Force Theme"). The tenth track also contains credited appearances of "The Imperial March". Portions of the soundtrack are featured in the video game.

The liner notes give plot summaries for each track's corresponding section of the novel. McNeely wrote, "Unlike with film music, I have been allowed to let my imagination run free with the images, characters and events from this story. I have also had the luxury to loiter as long as I like with a character or scene. Every passage represents some person, place or event in this story." Ben Burtt wrote a poem for the liner notes, about an ancient battle on Coruscant, which McNeely used in some compositions. In the lyrics, Burtt made references to the Droids series he was involved in writing.

The disc also includes an interactive track for personal computers, containing concept art and additional information about the project. The multimedia track includes an overview of the Shadows of the Empire project; a creative team gallery; information about McNeely, the orchestra, and the efforts to put together a soundtrack for the novel; and information about the book, the game, the comic series, and the toys based on the characters.

=== Track listing ===
1. "Main Theme from Star Wars and Leia's Nightmare" – 3:41 (Contains The Imperial March)
2. "The Battle of Gall" – 7:59
3. "Imperial City" – 8:02
4. "Beggar's Canyon Chase" – 2:56
5. "The Southern Underground" – 1:48
6. "Xizor's Theme" – 4:35
7. "The Seduction of Princess Leia" – 3:38
8. "Night Skies" – 4:17 (Contains The Imperial March and Force Theme)
9. "Into the Sewers" – 2:55
10. "The Destruction of Xizor's Palace" – 10:44 (Contains The Imperial March)

== Toys ==
Kenner was one of the companies that made the toy line for the Shadows of the Empire project. Their line contained action figures (including new characters such as Xizor and Dash Rendar), vehicles (from the Outrider to swoop bikes) and two-pack pairings of new and classic characters (such as IG-88 and Boba Fett). The classic characters figures were given a new spin with Chewbacca disguised as Snoova, a Wookiee bounty hunter, and Luke Skywalker costumed in an Imperial uniform (all the better to infiltrate Imperial City).

Lewis Galoob Toys, famous for their line of Micro Machines miniature toys and playsets, also developed a full Shadows of the Empire toy line. It included three sets of miniatures and a boxed Action Fleet set with two swoop bikes and riders and four miniature articulated figures. Also included in the sets are the classic Star Wars characters (Luke, Vader, the Emperor) as well as the new Shadows characters (Xizor, Dash Rendar, Guri and Leebo).

=== Kenner action figures ===
- Boba Fett vs. IG-88
- Chewbacca in Bounty Hunter Disguise (with Vibro-Axe and Heavy Blaster Rifle)
- Dash Rendar (with Heavy Weapons Pack)
- Leia in Boushh Disguise (with Blaster Rifle and Bounty Hunter Helmet)
- Luke Skywalker in Imperial Guard Disguise (with Taser Staff Weapon)
- Prince Xizor (with Energy Blade Shields)
- Prince Xizor vs. Darth Vader

=== Kenner vehicles ===
- Outrider - Dash Rendar's spaceship
- Slave I - Boba Fett's spaceship
- Swoop bike with Swoop Trooper

The model making company Ertl released several plastic model kits of Shadows of the Empire, including the Virago (Xizor's spaceship), Prince Xizor, and the Emperor.

Collectible and gift company Applause released two vinyl figures, of Dash Rendar and Prince Xizor as well as a cold-cast resin statuette of the villains: Xizor, the Emperor and Darth Vader.

== Trading cards ==
The Topps company developed the Shadows of the Empire trading card line. The 100-piece Shadows of the Empire card set from Topps represents all three platforms that tell the story—the book, comic series, and game. The cards are the work of Greg and Tim Hildebrandt, the twin artists who painted one of the more popular original Star Wars release posters. The 100 card set featured double UV-coating and an extra-thick 20 pt. card stock, all with full-bleed painted images on a 21/2" x 31/2" card. The Shadows of the Empire card series is highlighted by 72 cards that virtually storyboard the events in Steve Perry's novel. The series also contains six cards dedicated to vehicles, another six to the comics, and six more keyed to the video game. Each pack came with nine cards.

== Legacy ==
The 1996 Return of the Jedi radio drama by Brian Daley makes several references to Shadows of the Empire. In the 1997 Special Edition of A New Hope, swoop bikes and ASP labor droids make an appearance, as does Dash Rendar's ship, the Outrider. Though developed for the Special Edition of A New Hope, the Imperial landing craft made its first appearance in Shadows of the Empire.

The novel Specter of the Past (1997) mentions Xizor and the Bounty Hunter Wars trilogy (1998–1999) explores his and Fett's backstory. Several missions in the X-Wing Alliance (1999) computer game involve assisting Rendar in the capture of the Imperial freighter Suprosa, which was carrying the design schematics of the second Death Star. Rendar's Outrider can be seen in the game, as well as in 2002's Bounty Hunter. A one-shot comic book written by Ryder Windham called Shadow Stalker (2000) expands on the adventures of Jix before Shadows of the Empire. The planet Kothlis appears in later works such as the 2001 video game Rogue Squadron II: Rogue Leader and an ASP droid makes an appearance in the novelization of Attack of the Clones (2002). Rendar is the subject of a short story printed in a 2011 issue of Star Wars Insider, and the Falleen appear in a variety of works.

Following the 2012 acquisition of Lucasfilm by The Walt Disney Company, most of the licensed Star Wars novels and comics produced since the originating 1977 film were rebranded as Legends and declared non-canon in April 2014. The Falleen and Black Sun were made canon in 2013 episodes of The Clone Wars, in which Darth Maul's Shadow Collective absorbs the Falleen crime syndicate. A modified version of the Outrider (the ship model is a YT-2400 light freighter) appears in Star Wars Rebels. Additionally, Rendar is mentioned in the movie tie-in book Solo: A Star Wars Story – Tales from Vandor (2018) and the Galaxy's Edge cookbook (2019) features a recipe for "Xizor Salad".

In the Shadows of the Empire storyline, Leia obtains the armor of Black Sun-associated bounty hunter Boushh from Guri to get through Imperial customs on Coruscant. Contrarily, in the 2018 Forces of Destiny episode "Bounty Hunted", Leia and Maz Kanata take Boushh's armor directly from him on Ord Mantell. The 2021 canon comic crossover event War of the Bounty Hunters is set in the same era as Shadows of the Empire; it features Crimson Dawn (successor to the Shadow Collective) stealing the frozen Han from Boba Fett, and both Black Sun and Xizor are mentioned.

In 2023, Lucasfilm president Kathleen Kennedy stated that characters like Dash Rendar were discussed "all the time" for potential use in future projects, although there was nothing specific announced.
