= Star Wars: Visionaries =

Publication information
- Publishing company: Dark Horse Comics
- Subject: Star Wars
- Genre: Science fiction
- Release date(s): 2 April 2005
- Country: United States
- Language: English
- No. of pages: 136
- Size & Weight: 10.4 x 6.6 x 0.3 inches 10.24 ounces
- ISBN: ISBN 1-59307-311-9

Expanded Universe
- Galactic Year: 132 BBY - 3 ABY
- Canon: N

Creative team
- Script writer: Aaron McBride; Erik Tiemens; Derek Thompson; Mike Murnane; Alex Jaeger; M. Zachary Sherman; Stephan Martinière; Robert E. Barnes; Sang Jun Lee; Warren J. Fu
- Cover artist(s): Ryan Church
- Artist(s): Aaron McBride; Erik Tiemens; Derek Thompson; Mike Murnane; Alex Jaeger; M. Zachary Sherman; Stephan Martinière; Robert E. Barnes; Sang Jun Lee; Feng Zhu; Warren J. Fu
- Editor(s): Jeremy Barlow

Star Wars: Visionaries is a 2005 collection of 11 stories written and drawn by concept artists who worked on the film Star Wars: Episode III – Revenge of the Sith. The book is published by Dark Horse Comics and edited by Jeremy Barlow.

The comics constituting Visionaries are also collected in Star Wars Omnibus: Wild Space Volume 2.

== Contents ==
=== Old Wounds ===
Story and Art: Aaron McBride
13 pages
Galactic Year: 16 BBY
Preceded by: The Value of Proper Intelligence to Any Successful Military Campaign is Not to be Underestimated
Followed by: The Destroyer

The opening story begins with Owen Lars trying to teach new words to a toddler-age Luke Skywalker. They see a strange figure on the horizon running towards the Lars homestead. Owen instructs his wife, Beru, to bring him his rifle and take the boy inside. The figure dodges warning shots with ease and uses the Force to disarm Owen before smashing the weapon over his head. Standing on triple-jointed droid legs and concealed by a dark hood, the figure calls out through the Force to an unseen enemy. The voice claims to have been tracking this adversary for years, just missing him by two days on Kamino, one day on Geonosis, and only a few minutes on Mustafar. He had then killed witnesses on Polis Massa before finally gaining crucial information on Mos Espa from an aged Watto, whom he beheaded for his greed. The creature declares that he knows threatening Luke would bring his adversary out into the open, to which the hidden voice finally asks through the Force, "Does Palpatine know?" The cyborg-legged monster replies, "No. There is no Palpatine. No Empire. No Jedi. There is no Light. No Dark... Just you and I here now." At this point, Obi-Wan Kenobi bursts out from the sand. The dark figure casts off his hood and reveals himself to be Darth Maul, his severed lower body replaced by a pair of large cybernetic legs and abdomen, and his cranial horns having grown, crown-like, to over three times their original length. Kenobi and Maul engage in furious combat, in which Maul loses a further arm and four horns before being held at Kenobi's mercy. With his lightsaber hilt to Maul's forehead and his finger on the blade-ignition button, Kenobi hesitates to execute his helpless opponent, but has the decision taken out of his hands when the revived Owen blows the former Sith's head apart with his damaged rifle. As Kenobi prepares to leave and bury Maul's corpse, Owen asks Kenobi to permanently stay away from their farm, fearing that his presence will attract other potential enemies. Kenobi agrees. As he leaves, he tells Luke through the Force that he will always be watching over him.

The plot of Maul returning with cybernetic legs shared similarities with his canonical return in the CGI-animated The Clone Wars television series. The Old Wounds storyline would be adapted in the episode "Twin Suns" of the Star Wars Rebels animated series, where Maul tracks down Obi-Wan Kenobi to Tatooine and engages him in a final lightsaber duel, resulting in the former Sith Lord's death.

=== The Artist of Naboo ===
Story and Art: Erik Tiemens
12 pages
Galactic Year: 19 BBY
Preceded by: Revenge of the Sith
Followed by: Sithisis

=== Wat Tambor and the Quest for the Sacred Eye of the Albino Cyclops ===
Story and Art: Mike Murnane
13 pages
Galactic Year: 19 BBY
Preceded by: Brothers in Arms
Followed by: The Brink

=== Sithisis ===
Story and Art: Derek Thompson
14 pages
Galactic Year: 19 BBY
Preceded by: The Artist of Naboo
Followed by: Orders

=== Entrenched ===
Story M. Zachary Sherman
Art: Alex Jaeger
12 pages
Galactic Year: 3 ABY
Preceded by: Tag and Bink Are Dead 2
Followed by: Blind Fury

This story presents the Battle of Hoth (depicted in The Empire Strikes Back) from the perspective of a young Rebel soldier, Corporal Jobin Mothma. He has recorded a holographic message for his mother and the words in his message parallel the events in the story.

The Rebel troops prepare for the Imperial assault as the Empire unloads AT-ATs and Juggernauts. Jobin fights in the trenches with his squad. One of his men spots a group of snowtroopers and an AT-ST advancing on the Rebellion's Planetary ion cannon. After attempting to reach Ion Control, he and four of his men rush to outflank the AT-ST.

Meanwhile, the snowtroopers inside the now-captured emplacement listen to Rebel requests for ion support. The Rebels burst in. They dispatch the Imperials, losing a squad member. When Jobin fires the cannon, his men set it to self-destruct. The three remaining troops retreat to Hangar Bay Seven, only to find Darth Vader and his troops.

Jobin and his squad retreat to Hangar Bay Ten, but Jobin is shot. He gives his recorded message to one of his men. Darth Vader briefly interrogates him, but he doesn't talk. Vader kills him. Mon Mothma, apparently Jobin's mother, reads Jobin's letter at the Rebel rendezvous point near Sullust. Crix Madine tells her he's dead. She then goes to brief the Rebels for the Battle of Endor, with resolve in the words: "The emperor has made a critical error."

=== The Fourth Precept ===
Story and Art: Stephan Martinière
6 pages

The Fourth Precept is an artistic representation of the fight between good and evil. Two figures fight with lightsabers in various ethereal settings. It has no dialogue.

=== Prototypes ===
Story and Art: Robert E. Barnes
12 pages
Galactic Year: 132 BBY
Preceded by: The Apprentice
Followed by: Heart of Darkness

=== Imperial Recruitment ===
Story and Art: Feng Zhu
2 pages

Imperial Recruitment is a series of beautiful, scantily-clad human women in various military scenes with slogans urging citizens to enlist in the Imperial Navy.

=== Deep Forest ===
Story and Art: Sang Jun Lee
14 pages
Galactic Year: 21 BBY
Preceded by: Rather Darkness Visible
Followed by: The Battle of Jabiim

A Wookiee hunting expedition in the jungles of Kashyyyk becomes something far more dangerous than expected when a young warrior discovers a Separatist invasion force.

=== Celestia Galactica Photografica ===
Art: Ryan Church
12 pages

Celestia Galactica Photografica consists of a series of paintings depicting various scenes of the Galaxy; in terms of canonicity, they are in-universe paintings made by in-universe artists.

=== The Eyes of Revolution ===
Story and Art: Warren J. Fu
14 pages
Galactic Year: 23 BBY
Preceded by: Way of the Warrior
Followed by: Full of Surprises

On Kalee, a Kaleesh General named Qymaen jai Sheelal boards a shuttle to fight against the Huk. However, a device planted inside the shuttle then explodes, destroying it, as Count Dooku watches from the distance with electrobinoculars. Sheelal falls from the burning wreckage into the water below. Two MagnaGuards are sent to pull the legless general out of the water and a medical droid checks his vitals. Dooku administers a heart stun to keep Sheelal briefly alive and orders the droids to transport the Kaleesh to Geonosis immediately, declaring him ready for experimentation. Sheelal awakens in a tube filled with green liquid and is greeted by San Hill. Sheelal has been told that an InterGalactic Banking Clan frigate recovered his escape pod and brought him to Geonosis. Sheelal wants to go back to Kalee to be with his troops, but Hill tells him he won't survive the trip and proposes an experimental new treatment. Sheelal is interested in getting back and is apathetic towards the Separatist "New Order", but nonetheless accepts the offer. Dooku senses shallowness in his allegiance and orders Poggle the Lesser to leave Sheelal in the tank for some more time. Dooku then shows Poggle his old Jedi friend, Sifo-Dyas, who has been cryogenically preserved. Months later, Dooku gives Sifo-Dyas's lightsaber to Sheelal as a gift and reports to his master Darth Sidious that the experiment was successful. Sheelal lost his carnality, but still has anger, vanity, and a good mind for strategy. The newly christened General Grievous, enraged at being called a droid, uses his new lightsaber to kill all of the MagnaGuards surrounding him.

This origin story for General Grievous was later declared non-canon and changed in The Clone Wars animated series. While Grievous is still shown to be a former Kaleesh warlord, it is implied that he volunteered to be turned into a cyborg so that he could more easily kill Jedi.

== See also ==
- Star Wars Infinities
- Star Wars Tales
