= Jedi Council: Acts of War =

Jedi Council: Acts of War (Trade Paperback)

Publication information
- Publishing company: Dark Horse Comics
- Subject: Star Wars
- Genre: Science fiction
- Release date(s): 6 June 2001
- Country: United States
- Language: English
- No. of pages: 96

Expanded Universe
- Era: Rise of the Empire
- Series: Jedi Council: Acts of War
- Galactic Year: 33 BBY
- Canon: C
- Preceded by: Urchins
- Followed by: A Summer's Dream

Creative team
- Script writer: Randy Stradley
- Cover artist(s): David Michael Beck
- Penciller(s): Davide Fabri
- Inker(s): Christian Dalla Vecchia
- Colorist(s): Dave McCaig
- Letterer(s): Steve Dutro

Jedi Council: Acts of War is a 4-issue comics series, featuring several of the Jedi Masters, including Mace Windu, Qui-Gon Jinn, and Obi-Wan Kenobi. The comic is set less than a year before the Battle of Naboo in Star Wars: Episode I – The Phantom Menace, and 33 years before the Battle of Yavin in Star Wars Episode IV: A New Hope, telling the story of a Jedi task force sent to the Yinchorri system to settle a conflict.

== Issues ==
- Jedi Council: Acts of War 1
- Jedi Council: Acts of War 2
- Jedi Council: Acts of War 3
- Jedi Council: Acts of War 4

== Dramatis Personae ==
- Adi Gallia
- Darth Maul
- Darth Sidious
- Depa Billaba
- Ebor Taulk
- Eeth Koth
- Even Piell
- Finis Valorum
- Jude Rozess
- K'kruhk
- Lilit Twoseas
- Mace Windu
- Micah Giett
- Naeshahn
- Obi-Wan Kenobi
- Olmar Grahrk
- Oppo Rancisis
- Plo Koon
- Qui-Gon Jinn
- Saesee Tiin
- Sei Taria
- Soon Baytes
- Tharence Wo
- Theen Fida
- Tieren Nie-Tan
- Tsui Choi
- Vilmarh Grahrk
- Yaddle
- Yarael Poof
- Yoda

== Collections ==
- Jedi Council: Acts of War
- Omnibus: Rise of the Sith
