= Children of the Force =

Children of the Force may refer to

- Children of the Force, a Star Wars Tales comic
- "Children of the Force" (Star Wars: The Clone Wars), Star Wars: The Clone Wars episode
