= Qui-Gon & Obi-Wan =

Star Wars comic book miniseries

Qui-Gon & Obi-Wan: Last Stand on Ord Mantell

Publication information
- Publishing company: Dark Horse Comics
- Subject: Star Wars
- Genre: Science fiction
- Release date(s): 20 December 2000; 21 February 2001; 21 March 2001
- Country: United States
- Language: English
- No. of pages: 32

Expanded Universe
- Series: Qui-Gon & Obi-Wan

Creative team
- Script writer: Ryder Windham
- Cover artist(s): Ramon F. Bachs
- Penciller(s): Ramon F. Bachs
- Inker(s): Raul Fernandez
- Colorist(s): Bodhi Tree
- Letterer(s): Steve Dutro

Qui-Gon & Obi-Wan: The Aurorient Express

Publication information
- Publishing company: Dark Horse Comics
- Subject: Star Wars
- Genre: Science fiction
- Release date(s): 27 February 2002; 12 June 2002
- Country: United States
- Language: English
- No. of pages: 32

Expanded Universe
- Series: Qui-Gon & Obi-Wan

Creative team
- Script writer: Mike Kennedy
- Cover artist(s): Lucas Marangon
- Penciller(s): Lucas Marangon
- Inker(s): Howard M. Shum
- Colorist(s): Dan Jackson
- Letterer(s): Steve Dutro

Qui-Gon & Obi-Wan: Last Stand on Ord Mantell is a three-part comics series written by Ryder Windham, and published by Dark Horse Comics between December 2000 and March 2001. The series is set five years before Episode I – The Phantom Menace, and 37 years before Episode IV – A New Hope. The story features Qui-Gon Jinn and Obi-Wan Kenobi, who are sent into deep space to search for a valuable cargo freighter when it fails to reach its destination on the planet Coruscant.

Qui-Gon & Obi-Wan: The Aurorient Express is a two-part comics series written by Mike Kennedy, and published by Dark Horse Comics between February 2002 and June 2002. The series is set six years before The Phantom Menace, and 38 years before A New Hope. The story features Qui-Gon Jinn and Obi-Wan Kenobi. A luxury cloud cruiser has slipped out of control and is going to crash over Yorn Skot. The two Jedi must board the runaway ship and regain control.

== Last Stand on Ord Mantell summary ==
On Coruscant, Jedi Master Qui-Gon Jinn and his Padawan Obi-Wan Kenobi stop an assassination attempt by a mind-controlled guard on Baroness Omnino. Despite her distrust of the Jedi after her husband's death, Omnino summons Obi-Wan to protect her. During their negotiation, Omnino's son, Baron Sando, sends a distress signal from his freighter, which the two Jedi investigate. Qui-Gon and Obi-Wan find the entire crew dead, killed by a captive Mantellian Savrip, a large reptilian creature. They go to Ord Mantell after discovering the ship originated there.

Their investigation leads them to a moisture plant owned by Orin Bold. Bold tells the men he is resisting Taxer Sundown, a fellow farmer and rumored Force user who takes over moisture plants. The two learn that Sando's ship was in Sundown's territory. Orin's daughter, Nella, takes the Jedi there. Upon entering, they are met by a hologram of Sundown, who warns that they should not have come before a group of mind-controlled men wielding lightsabers attacks them and kidnaps Nella. Obi-Wan pursues Sundown to Orin's moisture plant while Qui-Gon goes after Nella's kidnappers.

Qui-Gon finds the kidnappers' ship destroyed, which is destroyed by Savrips. He tracks Nella to a Savrip camp. A Savrip catches Qui-Gon freeing Nella, but the Savrip explains that Sundown is enslaving them and blaming his massacres on them. Meanwhile, Obi-Wan learns that Orin and Nella have been mind-tricked into trafficking credits for Sundown. Orin attacks Sundown and breaks the device Sundown had been using to mind-control him. Afterward, Obi-Wan and Orin go to Sundown's transport, where they had arranged to meet with Qui-Gon and Nella.

At the transport area, Sundown is found dead, seemingly killed in a crash. Baroness Omnino arrives holding Galactic Republic Chancellor Valorum hostage. Omnino reveals that she fabricated the incident to have access to Coruscant, and that she aims to make a Savrip meat trade. Qui-Gon decapitates Omnino, revealing another mind-control device. Ord Mantellan colonists begin shooting at the Savrips, but Qui-Gon defuses the situation.

== Collections ==
- Omnibus: Rise of the Sith
