= Ryder Windham =

American science fiction author (born 1964)

Ryder Taylor Windham (born June 19, 1964) is an American author known for his extensive work in science fiction, particularly within the Star Wars universe. He has authored over 60 books related to Star Wars, encompassing novels, comics, and reference books, as well as junior novelizations of the Indiana Jones films. Since 1993, Windham has contributed to Star Wars literature, collaborating with other authors and working independently. His reference book, Star Wars: The Ultimate Visual Guide, was listed on the New York Times Best Seller list for three weeks in 2005.

== Career ==
=== Star Wars ===
Windham began his involvement with Star Wars projects in 1993 while employed at Dark Horse Comics. His role extended beyond writing, as he also oversaw the editing of comics in series such as Heir to the Empire, Jabba the Hutt, and Dark Empire II. His collaboration with Allan Kausch and Sue Rostoni at Lucas Licensing helped ensure continuity across Star Wars comics and novels. In his efforts to maintain narrative consistency, Windham worked alongside Leland Chee, the continuity database administrator for Lucasfilm, ensuring that his contributions to the Star Wars series remained coherent with the established universe.

=== Recent years ===
Since 2004, Windham has served as an instructor and certificate advisor for comic and sequential art classes at the Rhode Island School of Design Continuing Education. He resides in Providence, Rhode Island, with his family. Ryder Windham also works closely with the publisher becker&mayer! and Lucasfilm's publishing licensees, including Dark Horse Comics, Del Rey, DK Publishing, Grosset & Dunlap, HarperCollins, Random House, and Scholastic Inc. His work with the latter of these has included production of the Bionicle reboot novels and graphic novels.

=== Publications ===
Windham's bibliography includes a diverse range of Star Wars literature, from the Star Wars: The Clone Wars: Secret Missions series to junior novelizations of the original trilogy and the Indiana Jones films. His work in comics has contributed significantly to the Star Wars expanded universe, offering fans deeper insights into the saga's characters and stories.

== Novels ==
- Star Wars Missions 1: Assault on Yavin Four (1997)
- Star Wars Missions 2: Escape from Thyferra (1997)
- Star Wars Missions 3: Attack on Delrakkin (1997)
- Star Wars Missions 4: Destroy the Liquidator (1997)
- Star Wars Missions 9: Revolt of the Battle Droids (1998)
- Star Wars Missions 10: Showdown in Mos Eisley (1998)
- Star Wars Missions 11: Bounty Hunters vs. Battle Droids (1998)
- Star Wars Missions 12: The Vactooine Disaster (1998)
- Star Wars Missions 17: Darth Vader's Return (1999)
- Star Wars Missions 18: Rogue Squadron to the Rescue (1999)
- Star Wars Missions 19: Bounty on Bonadan (1999)
- Star Wars Missions 20: Total Destruction (1999)
- Episode I Adventures 1: Search for the Lost Jedi (1999)
- Episode I Adventures 2: The Bartokk Assassins (1999)
- Episode I Adventures 3: The Fury of Darth Maul (1999)
- Episode I Adventures 4: Jedi Emergency (1999)
- Episode I Adventures 9: Rescue in the Core (2000)
- Episode I Adventures 10: Festival of Warriors (2000)
- Episode I Adventures 11: Pirates from Beyond the Sea (2000)
- Episode I Adventures 12: The Bongo Rally (2000)
- Star Wars Adventures 1: Hunt the Sun Runner (2002)
- Star Wars Adventures 2: The Cavern of Screaming Skulls (2002)
- Star Wars Adventures 3: The Hostage Princess (2002)
- Star Wars Adventures 4: Jango Fett vs. the Razor Eaters (2003)
- Star Wars Adventures 5: The Shape-Shifter Strikes (2003)
- Star Wars Adventures 6: The Warlords of Balmorra (2003)
- Star Wars Episode IV: A New Hope junior novelization (2004)
- Star Wars Episode V: The Empire Strikes Back junior novelization (2004)
- Star Wars Episode VI: Return of the Jedi junior novelization (2004)
- Galactic Crisis! (2005)
- Journey Through Space (2005)
- Star Wars Lives & Adventures 1: The Rise and Fall of Darth Vader (2007)
- Star Wars Lives & Adventures 2: The Life and Legend of Obi-Wan Kenobi (2008)
- Indiana Jones and the Raiders of the Lost Ark junior novelization (2008)
- Indiana Jones and the Last Crusade junior novelization (2008)
- Star Wars Lives & Adventures 3: A New Hope: The Life of Luke Skywalker (2009)
- Star Wars The Clone Wars Secret Missions 1: Breakout Squad (2009)
- Star Wars The Clone Wars Secret Missions 2: Curse of the Black Hole Pirates (2010)
- Star Wars Adventures in HyperSpace: Fire Ring Race (2010)
- Star Wars Adventures in HyperSpace: Shinbone ShowDown (2010)
- Star Wars The Clone Wars Secret Missions 3: Duel at Shattered Rock (2011)
- Star Wars The Clone Wars Secret Missions 4: Guardians of the Chiss Key (2012)
- Indiana Jones and the Pyramid of the Sorcerer (2009)
- Star Wars Lives & Adventures 4: The Wrath of Darth Maul (2012)
- Star Wars Rebels: Ezra's Gamble (2014)
- LEGO BIONICLE: Island of Lost Masks (2015)
- LEGO BIONICLE: Revenge of the Skull Spiders (2016)
- LEGO BIONICLE: Escape from the Underworld (2016)

=== Comics ===
- "Star Wars Droids: Artoo's Day Out" in Star Wars Galaxy issue 1 (1994)
- Star Wars: The Mixed-Up Droid (1995)
- Star Wars Droids: The Kalarba Adventures (1995)
- X-wing Rogue Squadron: Apple Jacks Special Bonus Story (1995)
- Star Wars Droids (1995)
- Shadows of the Empire Galoob Micro-Machines Mini-Comic (1996)
- "This Crumb for Hire" in A Decade of Dark Horse issue 2 (1996)
- "The Rebel Thief" in Star Wars Kids issues 1-5 (1997)
- Shadow Stalker (1997)
- Star Wars Droids: The Protocol Offensive (1997)
- Battle of the Bounty Hunters (1998)
- Episode I: Qui-Gon Jinn (1999)
- Episode I: The Phantom Menace ½ (1999)
- Qui-Gon and Obi-Wan: Last Stand on Ord Mantell (2000)
- "The Death of Captain Tarpals" in Star Wars Tales issue 3 (2000)
- "Thank the Maker!" in Star Wars Tales issue 6 (2000)
- Podracing Tales (2000)
- Jedi Quest (2001)
- The Clone Wars: Strange Allies (2011)
- LEGO Bionicle: Gathering of the Toa (2015)
- LEGO Bionicle: Battle of the Mask Makers (2016)

=== Reference books ===
- Star Wars Who's Who (1998)
- Star Wars Episode I Who's Who: A Pocket Guide to Characters of the Phantom Menace (1999)
- Star Wars Episode I: The Phantom Menace Movie Scrapbook (1999)
- Aurra Sing: Dawn of the Bounty Hunters (2000), co-written with Josh Ling
- Star Wars Episode II: Attack of the Clones Movie Scrapbook (2002)
- Star Wars Episode III: Revenge of the Sith Movie Scrapbook (2005)
- Star Wars: The Ultimate Visual Guide (2005)
- Star Wars: The Comics Companion (2006)
- Jedi vs. Sith: The Essential Guide to the Force (2007)
- Star Wars: The Complete Vader (2009), co-written with Peter Vilmur
- Star Wars Blueprints: The Ultimate Collection (2008)
- Star Wars Blueprints: Rebel Edition (2010)
- Star Wars Year by Year: A Visual Chronicle (2010)
- Millennium Falcon: A 3-D Owner's Guide (2010)
- Imperial Death Star: Owner's Workshop Manual (2013)
- Ultimate Star Wars (2015), co-written with Tricia Barr, Adam Bray, and Daniel Wallace
- Star Wars: Stormtroopers: Beyond the Armor (2017)

=== Short stories ===
- Deep Spoilers (2000)

== Awards and honors ==
In 2005, Winham's book Star Wars: The Ultimate Visual Guide spent three weeks in the top 10 of the New York Times Best Seller list. This comprehensive reference book is known for its detailed exploration of the Star Wars universe, catering to both new fans and long-time enthusiasts alike.
