= Star Wars: The Bounty Hunters =

2000 trade paperback

Bounty Hunters (Trade Paperback)

Publication information
- Publishing company: Dark Horse Comics
- Subject: Star Wars
- Genre: Science fiction
- Release date(s): September 26, 2000
- Country: United States
- Language: English
- No. of pages: 112
- ISBN: ISBN 1-56971-467-3

Expanded Universe
- Era: Rise of the Empire
- Galactic Year: 31 BBY-11 ABY

Creative team
- Script writer: Andy Mangels, Mark Schultz, Randy Stradley and Timothy Truman
- Cover artist(s): Dave Dorman, Doug Wheatley, Dave McCaig, John Nadeau, Marc Gabbana and Timothy Truman
- Penciller(s): John Nadeau, Mel Rubi, Javier Saltares and Timothy Truman
- Inker(s): Jordi Ensign & Christopher Ivy & Andrew Pepoy & Timothy Truman
- Colorist(s): Amador Cisneros, Clem Robins and Michael Taylor
- Letterer(s): Amador Cisneros, Clem Robins and Michael Taylor
- Designer(s): Digital Broome, Dan Jackson, Dave McCaig and Cary Porter

Star Wars: The Bounty Hunters, also referred to as Star Wars: Bounty Hunters, is a Star Wars Legends trade paperback. It collects the three-part comic-book series Star Wars: The Bounty Hunters as well as the one-shot comic Star Wars: Boba Fett: Twin Engines of Destruction. It was published by Dark Horse Comics on September 26, 2000. An eBook version was published by Marvel Comics on January 8, 2015.
