= Dave Nestelle =

Comic book colorist and creator

Dave Nestelle is a comic book colorist and creator who is known for his Star Wars: X-wing – Rogue Squadron.

== Bibliography ==
- Star Wars: X-wing – Rogue Squadron
- Star Wars Tales
- Dark Horse Presents
- Star Wars
- Barb Wire Movie Special
- Dark Horse Monsters
- Agents of Law
