= Alex Jaeger =

American art director

Alex Jaeger is an American art director.

== Filmography ==
- 1996: Star Trek: First Contact, visual effects art director
- 1997: Starship Troopers, visual effects art director
- 2003: Hulk, visual effects art director
- 2007: Transformers, visual effects art director
- 2010: Iron Man 2, visual effects art director
- 2012: The Hunger Games, visual effects art director
- 2012: The Avengers, visual effects art director
- 2013: Pacific Rim, visual effects art director
