= Star Wars: Republic =

American comic book series

The cover of Star Wars: Republic #78: Loyalties featuring art by Luke Ross and Jason Keith

Star Wars: Republic is an American comic book series set in the fictional Star Wars universe. The series was published by Dark Horse Comics from 1998 to February 2006. The series was originally titled simply Star Wars, but acquired its Republic title at issue 46. The entire series comprises 83 issues. After issue 83, the series was replaced by Star Wars: Dark Times, which continued the Republic numbering on its inside covers. The Republic series is one of a number of comic book series set in the Star Wars Expanded Universe.

The events in Star Wars: Republic are set in roughly the same fictional timeframe as the Star Wars prequel trilogy. Character development builds on the films, including appearances by more prominent characters such as Mace Windu and Yoda, as well as peripheral characters such as Ki-Adi-Mundi and Quinlan Vos.

== Story arcs ==
=== Prelude to Rebellion ===
Issues 1–6 (December 1998–May 1999) were written by Jan Strnad with art by Anthony Winn.

Shortly before the events of The Phantom Menace, Jedi Master Ki-Adi-Mundi returns to his home world and defends his people, including his family, from raiders. After his success there, he is made a member of the Jedi Council.

=== Outlander ===
Issues 7–12 (June–November 1999) were written by Timothy Truman with art by Tom Raney, Rod Pereira, Rick Leonardi, and Al Rio.

Following the events of The Phantom Menace, Ki-Adi-Mundi is sent by the Jedi Council to Tatooine to investigate whether former Padawan Sharad Hett, who now identifies as a Tusken Raider, has become evil. Meanwhile, Gardulla and Jabba the Hutt send their minions to attack the Sand People in a scheme to drive the sales of outdated weapons. Hett dies, but his son and Padawan, A'Sharad Hett, returns to Coruscant to join the Jedi Order.

=== Emissaries to Malastare ===
Issues 13–18 (December 1999–May 2000) were written by Timothy Truman with art by Tom Lyle, Jan Duursema, and John Nadeau.

Jedi Masters Mace Windu, Yaddle, Adi Gallia, Plo Koon, Even Piell, and Ki-Adi-Mundi, as well as A'Sharad Hett, travel to Malastare to establish peace between two rival factions. They are caught up in the middle of a high-stakes podrace match that was played in a business ran by someone named toktzaxeman, which Sebulba dominates despite an assassination attempt on him. Mace then travels to Nar Shaddaa to investigate the trafficking of an animal from his home world.

=== Twilight ===
Quinlan Vos has had his memory erased, including his Jedi training and system of morality. He teams up with the Devaronian Vilmarh Grahrk, who places a bet on the Jedi's survival after failing to benefit from his death. Vos remembers his identity and that of his apprentice, Aayla Secura, when he finds their lightsabers. Vos and Grahrk travel to Ryloth in hopes of finding Secura and discovering who tried to erase her and Vos's existence.

=== Infinity's End ===
Quinlan Vos has been sent to Dathomir, where he is tasked with preventing a coven of crazy witches from using an outmoded portal to jump across spacetime, wreaking havoc to planets each time the gate is used.

=== Starcrash ===
A newly knighted Jedi crash-lands on a planet where he helps liberate a princess from an unwanted marriage.

=== The Hunt for Aurra Sing ===
Ki-Adi-Mundi, A'Sharad Hett, and Adi Gallia pursue Aurra Sing, who has recently been on a Jedi-slaying rampage.

=== Darkness ===
Quinlan Vos goes to a planet where the leader of some brain-devouring creatures has turned Aayla Secura to the dark side. Vos's former master shows up, as do some other Jedi and Vilmarh Grahrk, who help Vos save Secura.

=== The Devaronian Version ===
Issues 40 and 41 (March–May 2002) are written by John Ostrander with art by Davide Fabbri, and recount earlier events (previously depicted in Jedi Council: Acts of War) by Vilmarh Grahrk, with some embellishments.

=== The Dreadnaughts of Rendili ===
Issue 71 (November 2004) depicts Anakin Skywalker receiving his iconic eye scar in a duel with Asajj Ventress during the Clone Wars.

=== Loyalties ===
Issue 78 (October 2005) was written by John Ostrander with art by Luke Ross.

Shortly after the events of Revenge of the Sith, Emperor Palpatine introduces some of his highest-ranking Imperial officers to Darth Vader. One officer reluctant to serve the Empire, Sagoro Autem, is warned by his former partner Omin that he is soon to be executed. Vader arrives and kills Omin, knowing he helped Autem flee. The Sith lord hires three bounty hunters to find Autem, two of which he fights off. The third reveals himself as Autem's son, who flees with his father to the Outer Rim.

=== Into the Unknown ===
Issues 79 and 80 (November–December 2005) were written by Randy Stradley with art by Doug Wheatley.

Following the end of the Clone Wars, Jedi Master Kai Hudorra and Padawan Noirah Na hide from clone troopers, who have turned on the Jedi in accord with Order 66. Meanwhile, Jedi Master Dass Jennir befriends the natives of New Plympto, who were previously allied with the Separatists. All three Jedi travel to the Jedi Temple on Coruscant, where they witness a defiant Jedi being killed by clones. Hudorra and Na abandon the Jedi Order, and Jennir returns to New Plympto to fight the Galactic Empire. Jennir's story is continued in the first arc of Star Wars: Dark Times.

== Collected editions ==
=== Original series ===
- Star Wars: Prelude to Rebellion (collects #1-6)
- Star Wars: Outlander (collects #7-12)
- Star Wars: Emissaries to Malastare (collects #13-18)
- Star Wars: Twilight (collects #19-22)
- Star Wars: The Hunt for Aurra Sing (collects #28-31)
- Star Wars: Darkness (collects #32-35)
- Star Wars: The Stark Hyperspace War (collects #36-39)
- Star Wars: Rite of Passage (collects #42-45)
- Star Wars: Honor and Duty (collects #46-48, 78)

=== Clone Wars sub-series trade paperbacks (2003–2006) ===
- Star Wars: Clone Wars Volume 1: The Defense of Kamino (includes #49-50)
- Star Wars: Clone Wars Volume 2: Victories and Sacrifices (includes #51-53)
- Star Wars: Clone Wars Volume 3: Last Stand on Jabiim (collects #55-59)
- Star Wars: Clone Wars Volume 4: Light and Dark (includes #54, 63)
- Star Wars: Clone Wars Volume 5: The Best Blades (includes #60-62, 64)
- Star Wars: Clone Wars Volume 6: On the Fields of Battle (collects #65-71)
- Star Wars: Clone Wars Volume 8: The Last Siege, The Final Truth (collects #72-77)
- Star Wars: Clone Wars Volume 9: Endgame (includes #79-83)

=== 30th Anniversary Collection ===
- Star Wars: 30th Anniversary Collection Volume 5: Light and Dark (includes #54, 63)
- Star Wars: 30th Anniversary Collection Volume 6: Endgame (includes #79-83)

=== Omnibus ===
- Star Wars Omnibus: Rise of the Sith (includes #1-6)
- Star Wars Omnibus: Emissaries and Assassins (includes #7-18)
- Star Wars Omnibus: Menace Revealed (includes #27-31)
- Star Wars Omnibus: Quinlan Vos: Jedi in Darkness (collects #19-26, 32-45)
- Star Wars Omnibus: Clone Wars Volume 1 - The Republic Goes to War (includes #49-54, 61, 63, 67)
- Star Wars Omnibus: Clone Wars Volume 2 - The Enemy on All Sides (includes #55-60, 62, 64-66, 68)
- Star Wars Omnibus: Clone Wars Volume 3 - The Republic Falls (includes #69-77, 81-83)
- Star Wars Omnibus: Dark Times Volume 1 (includes #79-80)
