= Leddar =

LEDDAR (Light-Emitting Diode Detection And Ranging) is a proprietary technology owned by LeddarTech. It uses the time of flight of light signals and signal processing algorithms to detect, locate, and measure objects in its field of view.

== Technology ==
The Leddar technology is like a light-based radar that sends very short light pulses of invisible light about 100,000 times per second to actively illuminate an area of interest. The sensor captures the light backscattered from objects (either fixed or moving) over its detection area and processes the signals to precisely map their location and other attributes. The data is compiled thousands of times per second, providing up to a few hundred frames per second and offering accurate and reliable information even in adverse weather and lighting conditions.

The multi-channel sensor also provides lateral discrimination of detected objects and this feature, with 3D measurements, provides the basis for object tracking.

== Examples of Leddar Applications ==
=== Smart Cities ===
- Traffic light and intersection management
- Vehicle traffic flow monitoring
- Parking space occupancy management
- Automated highway toll
- Vehicle size monitoring and profiling
- Speed-limit enforcement
- Water-level monitoring
- Smart lighting applications
- Public space and building security

=== Smart Vehicles ===
- Collision warning and avoidance
- Obstacle detection
- Assisted driving (blind spots, parking, automatic cruise control)
- Unmanned vehicles, drones and UAV navigation assistance
- Heavy machinery and truck safety, as well as perimeter control
- Transportation vehicles’ bulk material levels (solids, liquids)
- Height and distance measurements

=== Smart Homes and Buildings ===
- Indoor security and surveillance (presence, movement, intrusion)
- Outdoor security and surveillance (perimeter intrusion)
- Occupancy sensing
- Touchless and remote controls (water faucets, lighting, etc.)
- Presence detection in unauthorized areas
- Autonomous robotic appliance navigation and collision avoidance

=== Smart Industries and Agriculture ===
- Mobile equipment and robot navigation
- Vehicle collision avoidance
- Machine safety (distance measurements, perimeter intrusion)
- Security and surveillance (presence, movement, intrusion)
- Smart level metering in tanks and reservoirs
- Bulk material volume estimates
- Silos, tanks, and reservoir level measurements
- Touchless remote controls (water faucets, lighting, etc.)

== See also ==
- Time of flight
- Rangefinder
- Laser rangefinder
- LIDAR
- Sonar
- Radar
