= Mace Windu =

Fictional character in Star Wars

- Star Wars character
- Samuel L. Jackson as Mace Windu (Note: Promotional image for Attack of the Clones (2002))
- First appearance: The Phantom Menace
- Created by: George Lucas
- Portrayed by: Samuel L. Jackson
- Voiced by: Samuel L. Jackson (Note: The Clone Wars (film) The Rise of Skywalker); Terrence C. Carson (Note: The Clone Wars (series) Clone Wars Tales of the Jedi Various video games); Donald Glover (Note: Robot Chicken); Adrian Holmes (Note: Lego Star Wars: The Yoda Chronicles Lego Star Wars: Droid Tales); Kevin Michael Richardson (Note: Star Wars Episode I: Jedi Power Battles Star Wars: Obi-Wan Star Wars: Jedi Starfighter)

In-universe information
- Occupation: Jedi Master; Jedi General
- Affiliation: Jedi Order; Galactic Republic
- Masters: Cyslin Myr; Yoda; Others in Legends (Note: Windu's master in the Star Wars Legends narrative universe is T'ra Saa.)
- Apprentice: Depa Billaba
- Homeworld: Haruun Kal

Mace Windu is a fictional character in the Star Wars franchise. He was introduced in the prequel trilogy as a Jedi Master who sits on the Jedi High Council during the final years of the Galactic Republic. He is portrayed by Samuel L. Jackson in all three prequel films. Windu also appears in the 2008 animated film The Clone Wars, the television series of the same name, and in novels, comics, and video games.

Windu wields a unique purple-bladed lightsaber, and is regarded as one of the most powerful Jedi of his time, second only to Yoda. During the Clone Wars, Windu becomes a Jedi General. He initially believes that Anakin Skywalker should not be trained as a Jedi, which leads to an antagonistic relationship between the two. Windu later participates in denying Anakin the rank of Jedi Master. Anakin eventually betrays Windu to protect the Sith Lord Darth Sidious, who subsequently defenestrates Windu.

== Creation and development ==
Several early incarnations of the character were present in George Lucas's original Star Wars drafts. They included a narrator, Princess Leia's brother and Luke Skywalker's friend. The character was ultimately removed from the original film trilogy, but it resurfaced in 1994 when Lucas began writing the prequel trilogy.

Although his weapon was not seen onscreen until Attack of the Clones, action figures released for The Phantom Menace paired Windu with a blue lightsaber. During the production of Attack of the Clones, Jackson asked Lucas if his character could wield a purple lightsaber to make him easily distinguishable in large battle scenes. According to Jackson, the lightsaber's hilt was engraved with the phrase "bad motherfucker", which is a reference to his role in Pulp Fiction. The engraving is not visible in the films. Even though Windu dies in Revenge of the Sith, Jackson has called for the character's return in future Star Wars media.

== Appearances ==
=== Prequel trilogy ===
Windu first appeared in The Phantom Menace (1999), the first film of the prequel trilogy. He is portrayed by Jackson in all three prequel films. In The Phantom Menace, the Jedi Master Qui-Gon Jinn comes before the Jedi High Council and requests that nine-year-old Anakin Skywalker be trained, believing he is the Chosen One of Jedi prophecy destined to bring balance to the Force. Windu and the other Council members deny the request, believing Anakin is too old and full of fear. When the Council discover that the Sith have returned after being presumed extinct for a millennium; they reluctantly allow Obi-Wan Kenobi to train Anakin.

Windu returns in Attack of the Clones (2002), which is set ten years after the previous film. He initially refuses to believe that the assassination attempt on Senator Padmé Amidala was planned by the former Jedi Master Count Dooku, who is now the leader of a Separatist movement. After Obi-Wan is captured on Geonosis while investigating the Separatists, Windu leads a cadre of Jedi to rescue him. In the ensuing battle, Windu beheads the bounty hunter Jango Fett and leads a clone army to victory against Dooku's forces. As the Clone Wars begin, Windu resolves to keep an eye on the increasingly corrupt Galactic Senate.

Revenge of the Sith (2005) takes place three years after the beginning of the Clone Wars. Windu and the other members of the Jedi Council are concerned that the Republic's Supreme Chancellor, Palpatine, may not relinquish his emergency powers when the Wars end. Their suspicions grow when the Senate grants Palpatine a vote on the Council by appointing Anakin as his personal representative. Although Anakin is granted Council membership, Windu notifies him that he will not be granted the rank of Jedi Master. This infuriates Anakin and diminishes his trust in the Council.

After Obi-Wan kills the Separatist leader General Grievous, Palpatine reveals to Anakin that he is the Sith Lord Darth Sidious, the mastermind of the war. When Anakin informs Windu of Sidious' treachery, Windu and three other Jedi Masters attempt to arrest Sidious. The Sith Lord easily kills Windu's companions and then duels with him, but Windu successfully disarms the Dark Lord. With Windu's victory imminent, Anakin pleads with him to spare Sidious—who, unbeknownst to Windu, has promised to teach Anakin to use the dark side to save his pregnant wife, Padmé Amidala, from dying in childbirth. Windu responds that Sidious is too dangerous to be kept alive, and prepares to execute him. However, desperate to save his wife, Anakin betrays Windu by severing his weapon hand before he can deliver the killing blow. Sidious then blasts Windu with Force lightning and defenestrates him, and he falls to his death.

=== The Rise of Skywalker ===
Jackson makes a vocal cameo as Windu in The Rise of Skywalker (2019), the final film of the sequel trilogy, set 54 years after his death in Revenge of the Sith. During Rey's battle against the resurrected Palpatine, she hears the voices of various deceased Jedi, including Windu.

=== The Clone Wars ===
Jackson voices Windu in the 2008 animated film The Clone Wars, which is set shortly after the beginning of the Wars. Like all other Jedi Masters, he is a General in the Grand Army of the Republic. Windu also appears in the animated series The Clone Wars (2008–2014; 2020), which is set between the film The Clone Wars and Revenge of the Sith. He is voiced by Terrence C. Carson. In the series, Windu participates in the liberation of Ryloth, encounters Boba Fett as he attempts to avenge the death of his father Jango, and tries to recover a stolen Jedi Holocron. He also works with Jar Jar Binks to rescue the queen of Bardotta, who was captured by a cult led by Mother Talzin. In the final season of the series, Windu and Obi-Wan lead the Republic's ground forces in the Anaxes campaign. Windu manages to deactivate a bomb hidden by Admiral Trench. During a meeting of the Jedi Council, Windu orders Ahsoka Tano to deliver Maul to Coruscant.

=== Comics ===
In 2017, Marvel released Jedi of the Republic – Mace Windu, a five-issue comic series focused on Windu during the early days of the Clone Wars. He leads a small team of Jedi to a remote planet to investigate a Separatist presence, then battles a mercenary droid hired by General Grievous. One of the Jedi turns on Windu after becoming disillusioned with the Jedi Order's involvement in war. Windu appears in flashbacks in the comic miniseries Star Wars Jedi: Fallen Order – Dark Temple.

=== Legends ===
Following the acquisition of Lucasfilm by The Walt Disney Company in 2012, most of the licensed Star Wars Expanded Universe material produced between 1977 and 2014 was rebranded as Star Wars Legends and declared non-canon to the franchise. The Legends works comprise a separate narrative universe. (Note: Attributed to multiple references:)

==== Novels ====
Windu appears in the novels Cloak of Deception, Darth Maul: Shadow Hunter, Rogue Planet, Outbound Flight, The Cestus Deception, Jedi Trial, Yoda: Dark Rendezvous, Labyrinth of Evil and Matthew Stover's Shatterpoint (2003).

Shatterpoint takes place six months after Attack of the Clones. It is based on Joseph Conrad's novel Heart of Darkness (1899). In the novel, Windu's former Padawan and fellow Jedi Master Depa Billaba has been sent to Windu's homeworld, Haruun Kal, to start a revolution against the Separatist-allied government. After the Jedi Council finds evidence that Billaba has fallen to the dark side of the Force, Windu is sent to find her. After a fight, he puts Billaba under arrest. The Separatists are forced to surrender to the Republic, and Billaba falls into a vegetative coma. A Republic force stays on the planet to police the restive local tribes. The novel explores Windu's unique talent of sensing "shatterpoints"—faultlines in the Force which reveal his enemies' weaknesses. It explains that Windu is the creator and sole master of Vaapad, a form of lightsaber combat which skirts dangerously close to the dark side.

==== Comics ====
Windu appears in the "Emissaries to Malastare" story arc (1999–2000) of the Star Wars: Republic comic series. He and other Jedi Masters travel to Malastare to establish peace between two rival factions. They subsequently find themselves caught in the middle of a high-stakes podrace. Windu then travels to Nar Shaddaa to investigate the trafficking of an animal from his homeworld.

==== Clone Wars ====
Terrence C. Carson voices Windu in the animated micro-series Clone Wars (2003–2005) which takes place between Attack of the Clones and Revenge of the Sith. In the early chapters, he defends the grasslands planet Dantooine against a hovering Separatist fortress. He loses his lightsaber during a battle, which forces him to use a lethal form of unarmed combat powered by the Force. In later chapters, Windu and Yoda help defend Coruscant from an attack by General Grievous, but are unable to prevent him from kidnapping Palpatine.

==== Videogames ====
Windu appeared as a playable character in Fortnite on May 1st 2025 during their Star Wars themed season.
