= Star Wars in other media =

Background of the Star Wars universe outside of the feature films

Star Wars has been expanded to other media since the eponymous 1977 film, including many books, comic books, and video games, as well as other forms such as audio dramas. Licensed and moderated by Lucasfilm, these derivative works have been produced concurrently with, between, and after the original, prequel, and sequel trilogies, as well as the spin-off films and television series.

Star Wars creator George Lucas reserved the right to draw from and contradict spin-off media in his own works. Non-film material produced before 2014, with the exception of the animated The Clone Wars TV series, was collectively known as the Star Wars Expanded Universe (EU). On April 25, 2014, Lucasfilm—which had been acquired by Disney in 2012—renamed the Expanded Universe Star Wars Legends and declared it non-canonical to the franchise. Since then, most but not all new Star Wars works have been part of the official Lucasfilm canon.

== Publication history ==
=== 1976–1987: Early films and television series ===
The first Star Wars spinoff material was Star Wars: From the Adventures of Luke Skywalker (1976), the novelization of the 1977 film. Lucas later commissioned Alan Dean Foster, who ghostwrote the novelization, to write a sequel, which resulted in Splinter of the Mind's Eye (1978). Lucas originally intended to use this as the basis for a potential low-budget sequel to Star Wars, but when it became one of the most successful films of all time, Lucas decided to write his own story for the film sequel, The Empire Strikes Back (1980). While this was in production, Lucas approved the Star Wars Holiday Special (1978), with which he had limited involvement.

Running from April 1977 to May 1986, the Star Wars comic book series from Marvel Comics met with such strong sales that former Marvel editor-in-chief Jim Shooter credited it with saving Marvel financially in 1977 and 1978. The series became one of the industry's top selling titles in 1979 and 1980. An adaptation of the third theatrical film, Return of the Jedi, was released as a separate four-issue limited series (1983–1984).

Two novel trilogies with original storylines were written, The Han Solo Adventures by Brian Daley (1979–1980), and 1983's The Adventures of Lando Calrissian by L. Neil Smith. Daley also wrote radio dramatizations of the original trilogy, which aired in 1981, 1983, and 1996.

The first Star Wars electronic game was released in 1979 by Kenner, followed by a handful of Atari and Parker Brothers video games in the early 1980s, mainly adaptations of film scenes.

Two spin-off television films focusing on the life of the Ewoks, introduced in Return of the Jedi, aired in 1984 and 1985. The furry creatures were also the subject of an American/Canadian animated television series produced by Nelvana, which ran for two seasons between 1985 and 1986. A sister series, Droids, features the further adventures of R2-D2 and C-3PO. In 1985, Marvel Comics' Star Comics imprint published a bi-monthly Ewoks tie-in comic, which ran for two years, and in 1986, published an eight-issue Droids series. The two series featured a crossover storyline.

The Star Tours ride was opened at Disney Parks in 1987 to commemorate the saga's 10th anniversary.

=== 1987–1991: "The Dark Times" ===
Following the series' 10th anniversary, the release of Star Wars spin-off media was largely halted. In 1987, the fan newsletter Bantha Tracks was absorbed by the official Lucasfilm magazine, which focused on the company's projects outside of Star Wars. Some fans feared that the franchise had come to an end, and the period between 1987 and 1991 has been called the "Dark Times."

There were some bright spots in this era, however. In 1987, West End Games began publishing Star Wars: The Roleplaying Game, and the subsequent ancillary role-playing game material such as sourcebooks, gamebooks, and adventure modules. These have been called "the first publications to expand greatly beyond what was known from the vintage era of the movies," and would serve as a resource for a number of franchise novelists.

=== 1991–1996: Thrawn novels and Dark Empire comics ===
The lack of new Star Wars material ended with the 1991 release of Timothy Zahn's novel Heir to the Empire. Heir to the Empire, which reached #1 on The New York Times Best Seller list, began what would become a large collection of works set before, between, and especially after the original films. StarWars.com wrote in 2014 that the novel "jumpstarted a publishing program that endures to this day and formalized the Expanded Universe". It introduced, among others, the popular characters Grand Admiral Thrawn and Mara Jade, and was followed by the sequels Dark Force Rising (1992) and The Last Command (1993). The Thrawn trilogy is widely credited with revitalizing the Star Wars franchise. In The Secret History of Star Wars, Michael Kaminski suggests this renewed interest was a factor in Lucas's decision to create the prequel trilogy.

Around this same time, the comics license was transferred to Dark Horse Comics, who launched a number of series set after the original film trilogy, including the popular Dark Empire sequence (1991–1995) by Tom Veitch and Cam Kennedy. The comic launched months after the first Thrawn novel and was a sequel to those novels; it notably resurrected the film characters Emperor Palpatine and Boba Fett. Zahn was critical of the concept of resurrecting Emperor Palpatine through cloned bodies, feeling it undermined and contradicted the meaning of the ending of Return of the Jedi.

The Jedi Prince series of young-reader novels, released between 1992 and 1993, depicts Luke, Leia, and Han about a year after Return of the Jedi. The Truce at Bakura (1993) depicts the immediate aftermath of the aforementioned film. In 1993, Dark Horse published Tales of the Jedi, expanding the fictional universe to the time of the Old Republic, approximately 4,000 years before the films. Later, the series spawned the Knights of the Old Republic computer roleplaying games, which led to many new productions set during the Old Republic era, such as the Bane Trilogy and the Knights of the Old Republic comic line.

In 1994, Lucas Licensing's Allan Kausch and Sue Rostoni discussed the relationship between Lucas' creations and the derivative works by other authors:

Gospel, or canon as we refer to it, includes the screenplays, the films, the radio dramas and the novelizations. These works spin out of George Lucas' original stories, the rest are written by other writers. However, between us, we've read everything, and much of it is taken into account in the overall continuity. The entire catalog of published works comprises a vast history—with many off-shoots, variations and tangents—like any other well-developed mythology.

=== 1996–1999: Special Editions and Shadows of the Empire ===
The 1996 Steve Perry novel Shadows of the Empire, set in the as-yet-unexplored time period between The Empire Strikes Back and Return of the Jedi, was part of a multimedia campaign that also included a comic book series and video game. The multimedia project was largely meant to reinvigorate the franchise ahead of the prequel trilogy, along with Lucas's 1997 Special Editions of the original trilogy. Lucas incorporated elements of the Expanded Universe into the Special Editions; for example, Coruscant, the New Republic capital planet created by Zahn in the Thrawn trilogy, made its film debut in the Special Edition of Return of the Jedi, before being featured more heavily in the prequel trilogy. An eponymous comic book series, later subtitled Republic, launched in 1998 and introduced Ki-Adi-Mundi ahead of his appearance in the films.

In 1999, Star Wars book publishing moved from Bantam Spectra to Del Rey Books. A new series set between 25 and 30 years after the original films, The New Jedi Order (1999–2003), was written by multiple authors and introduced a new threat: the Yuuzhan Vong, a powerful alien race attempting to invade and conquer the entire galaxy. The first novel in the series, R. A. Salvatore's Vector Prime, killed off popular character Chewbacca. (Note: Discussing the restructured Disney canon in 2014, Chee said the death of Chewbacca in Vector Prime was a key factor in the decision to rebrand the existing Expanded Universe as non-canon.)

=== 1999–2014: Prequel film trilogy and The Clone Wars ===
Before 1999, the bulk of the Expanded Universe explored the time periods either after Return of the Jedi or long before A New Hope (e.g. the Tales of the Jedi series). The time period shortly before the original trilogy (including the rise of the Galactic Empire and the personal histories of Anakin Skywalker and Emperor Palpatine) was largely kept "off-limits" for Lucas to develop in the form of a prequel trilogy, which began with Episode I: The Phantom Menace (1999).

The character Aayla Secura, introduced in 2000 in the Republic comic book series, appears in Episode II: Attack of the Clones (2002). The 2003 animated series Clone Wars and various spin-off books, comics, and video games explore the titular conflict in more detail leading up to Episode III: Revenge of the Sith (2005). Ahead of the film's release, Lucas announced a 3D "continuation" of Clone Wars, which was released as the animated film The Clone Wars (2008) and a television series of the same name (2008–2020). These reveal that Anakin had a Padawan learner, Ahsoka Tano, during this period. Various characters seen only briefly in the films or in other spin-off material are featured in more depth. At this time, Lucas denied any plans to ever make a Star Wars sequel trilogy.

As of 2004, over 1,100 Star Wars titles had been published, including novels, comics, non-fiction, and magazines. Then-president of Lucas Licensing, Howard Roffman, estimated that there were more than 65 million Star Wars books in print. He said, "The books are a way of extending the fantasy of Star Wars. The movies have had a really profound effect on a couple of generations. Star Wars has become a cultural touchpoint, and our fans are avidly interested in exploring more stories."

==== Holocron database and canonicity ====
Originally, Lucasfilm tracked the narrative content of the Expanded Universe in story bibles, alongside official reference books such as A Guide to the Star Wars Universe (1984/1994) and the Star Wars Encyclopedia (1998). In 2000, LucasArts lead tester Leland Chee was hired as Continuity Database Administrator for Lucas Licensing, and developed a database of franchise continuity based in part on 1998's encyclopedic Star Wars: Behind the Magic CD-ROM. (Note: This included the first release of certain deleted scenes from the original trilogy.) The database came to be known as the Holocron, a term used within the Star Wars universe for "ancient repositories of knowledge and wisdom". The Holocron consists of over 55,000 entries for franchise characters, locations, species, and vehicles.

Lucas Licensing's managing editor Sue Rostoni said in 2001, "Our goal is to present a continuous and unified history of the Star Wars galaxy, insofar as that history does not conflict with, or undermine the meaning of Mr. Lucas's Star Wars saga of films and screenplays." Lucasfilm's director of fan relations Steve Sansweet clarified:

When it comes to absolute canon, the real story of Star Wars, you must turn to the films themselves—and only the films. Even novelizations are interpretations of the film, and while they are largely true to George Lucas' vision (he works quite closely with the novel authors), the method in which they are written does allow for some minor differences ... The further one branches away from the movies, the more interpretation and speculation come into play. LucasBooks works diligently to keep the continuing Star Wars expanded universe cohesive and uniform, but stylistically, there is always room for variation.

In August 2005, Lucas said of the Expanded Universe:

I haven't read any of the novels. I don't know anything about that world ... But I do try to keep it consistent ... if I come up with a name or something else, I look it up and see if it has already been used. When I said [other people] could make their own Star Wars stories, we decided that ... we would have two universes: My universe and then this other one. They try to make their universe as consistent with mine as possible, but obviously they get enthusiastic and want to go off in other directions.

Regarding the Holocron database in 2012, Chee said: "What sets Star Wars apart from other franchises is that we develop a singular continuity across all forms of media, whether it be the films, TV series, video games, novels and comics, and the Holocron is a key component to Lucasfilm being able to do this." The Holocron was divided into five levels of canon (in order of precedence):

- G-canon was "George Lucas canon": Episodes I–VI (the released films at that time) overrode the lower levels of canonicity, even when referring to elements introduced in other media. In the words of Leland Chee: "George's view of the universe is his view. He's not beholden to what's gone before."
- T-canon was Television canon: The canonicity level comprising The Clone Wars, which Lucas co-created.
- C-canon was Continuity canon: Most of the material from the Expanded Universe including books, comics, and video games. The creation of stories that introduced radical changes in the continuity, like The Force Unleashed video game (which introduced Darth Vader's secret apprentice Starkiller), required Lucas's approval, and he spent hours explaining the character relationships to the developers.
- S-canon was Secondary canon: Any element introduced in Continuity canon that was contradicted by other material. The Holiday Special is an example, except for elements referenced in higher levels of canon.
- D-canon was Detours canon: Elements of the unreleased show Detours, though primarily intended as a parody of the franchise, were to follow a serial storyline that existed in a low level of canonicity.
- N-canon was Non-canon: "What if" stories (such as the first 20 issues of the Star Wars Tales comic anthology), crossover appearances (such as Star Wars character appearances in Soulcalibur IV), game statistics, and anything else directly contradicted by higher levels of canon.

==== Disney acquisition and canon restructuring ====
Since April 2014, the Legends label has been featured on reprints of Expanded Universe works that fall outside the Star Wars franchise canon.

On October 30, 2012, the Walt Disney Company acquired Lucasfilm for US$4.06 billion (equivalent to about US$5.69B in 2025 due to inflation). Subsequently, Lucasfilm formed the "Lucasfilm Story Group", which was established to keep track of and define the canon and unify the films, comics, and other media. Among its members are Chee, Kiri Hart, and Pablo Hidalgo. To prevent the planned sequel trilogy from being beholden to and restrained by the plotlines of the Expanded Universe works, the choice was made to discard that continuity. (Note: All events set after Return of the Jedi, such as the Yuuzhan Vong War (in which Chewbacca was killed) and Boba Fett's escape from the sarlacc, were removed from continuity. Major characters like Mara Jade (and by extension her marriage to Luke Skywalker) and Han Solo and Leia Organa's children were likewise removed. Other notable exclusions from the canon were the Ewoks television movies, the 2003 Clone Wars animated series, the Knights of the Old Republic video games, the Shadows of the Empire multimedia project, and video game characters like Darth Vader's apprentice, Starkiller, and stormtrooper-turned-Jedi Kyle Katarn.)

On April 25, 2014, Lucasfilm rebranded most of the Expanded Universe material with the exception of The Clone Wars as Star Wars Legends and declared it non-canonical to the franchise. The company's focus would be shifted towards a restructured Star Wars canon based on new material. Chee said in a 2014 Twitter post that a "primary goal" of the story group would be to replace the previous hierarchical canon (of the Holocron) with one cohesive one. However, the final season of The Clone Wars, which was released in 2020, contradicted aspects of the 2016 canon novel Ahsoka. The next year, The Clone Wars spin-off series The Bad Batch contradicted canon elements of the 2015 Kanan comic book series. The Bad Batch executive producer Jennifer Corbett explained that "Everything we did was for a reason and it might not match 100% but it's sort of just wanting to honor what existed but also give another take on it in this story."

In 2019, Marvel published a one-issue continuation of its 1977 Star Wars comic series for the company's 80th anniversary, making it the first new story to be published in the Legends continuity. In 2021, Del Rey Books announced it would be republishing several popular Legends novels as part of the Essential Legends Collection for the franchise's 50th anniversary, starting with Heir to the Empire, Darth Bane: Path of Destruction and Shatterpoint.

=== 2014–2019: Sequel trilogy and anthology films ===
In its 2014 announcement, Lucasfilm explained that the only preexisting works to be considered canonical within the franchise would be the primary episodic films and the 2008 The Clone Wars film and TV series. (Note: The sole exception is the serialized short story "Blade Squadron" by David J. and Mark S. Williams, which debuted in Star Wars Insider Issue 149 on April 22, 2014, three days prior to the "Legends" announcement. "Blade Squadron" is thus the first canonical Star Wars story outside the original six episodic films and The Clone Wars.) The announcement called these works "the immovable objects of Star Wars history, the characters and events to which all other tales must align." It was also made clear that a planned Star Wars sequel trilogy, and subsequent works developed within the restructured canon, would not be based on Legends material but could possibly draw from it. The first new canonical novel was A New Dawn by John Jackson Miller, published in September 2014, acting as a prologue to the animated television series Star Wars Rebels, which was released a month later. Marvel began publishing new Star Wars comic book series in January 2015, and the Journey to Star Wars publishing initiative included books and comics tying in to the sequel trilogy films.

The first sequel trilogy film, The Force Awakens, was released in December 2015. There was some minor fan backlash against the restructured canon, with one group successfully campaigning to buy a billboard pleading for Lucasfilm to continue the original non-canonical Expanded Universe separately from the canon. Rebels supervising director Dave Filoni reintroduced popular Legends character Thrawn into the canon in the 2016 third season of Rebels. Timothy Zahn was hired to write new canonical novels about the character. Since co-creating The Clone Wars, Filoni has followed Lucas (who incorporated Expanded Universe elements into the Special Editions, prequels, and The Clone Wars) in incorporating multiple spin-off elements into his series. Some cancelled The Clone Wars episodes were adapted into books and comics in The Clone Wars Legacy multimedia project.

After The Force Awakens, multiple films were released, including the anthology films Rogue One (2016) and Solo: A Star Wars Story (2018), as well as the second and third sequel trilogy films, The Last Jedi (2017) and The Rise of Skywalker (2019). Dozens of novels, comics published by Marvel and IDW, and games like Battlefront II (2017) were released. Additionally, the animated series Resistance, set in the sequel trilogy era, premiered in late 2018 and ran until early 2020.

=== 2019–present: The Mandalorian and other titles ===
The Mandalorian, a post-Return of the Jedi live-action series written by Jon Favreau premiered in late 2019 on the Disney streaming service Disney+. In early 2020, a final season of The Clone Wars animated series debuted on the streaming service.

In February 2020, it was announced that a new line of books and comics, labeled The High Republic, would begin publishing starting in August. The line takes place 200 years prior to the events of The Phantom Menace and will not overlap any films or series currently planned for production.

In December 2020, multiple live-action series were announced for Disney+, including Obi-Wan Kenobi, Andor, Lando, three Mandalorian spin-offs, and The Acolyte (set during the High Republic). On April 2, 2021, several legacy Star Wars films and series were added to Disney+. The Bad Batch debuted on May 4.

Multiple comics relaunched in 2020, moving to the era between The Empire Strikes Back and Return of the Jedi.

== Legends fictional timeline ==
The Star Wars Legends fictional universe spans multiple eras. The names, symbols, and dates of the publishing eras were first introduced in October 2000 and were refined up to February 2015:

- Before the Republic (pre-25,053 BBY [Before the Battle of Yavin]): The only major releases in this era were the Dawn of the Jedi comic series and novel.
- Old Republic (25,053–1,000 BBY): Includes the Tales of the Jedi comic series, the Knights of the Old Republic video games, The Old Republic MMORPG, the Knight Errant comic series, and the Darth Bane trilogy of novels.
- Rise of the Empire (1,000–0 BBY): The era leading up to and including the prequel trilogy as well as the subsequent reign of the Empire.
- Rebellion (0 BBY–5 ABY [After the Battle of Yavin]): The era of the original trilogy and its associated novels, comics, and video games.
- New Republic (5 ABY–25 ABY): The era following the original trilogy, including the Jedi Prince, X-wing, The Thrawn Trilogy, Young Jedi Knights, and other novel series.
- New Jedi Order (25–40 ABY): The era of The New Jedi Order and The Dark Nest trilogy novel series.
- Legacy (40–140 ABY): The era of the Legacy of the Force and Fate of the Jedi novel series as well as the Star Wars: Legacy comic series.
- Infinities: Alternate universe stories and parodies that are intentionally set outside of the Star Wars Legends continuity.

== See also ==
- List of Star Wars characters
- List of Star Wars Legends characters
- List of Star Wars: Knights of the Old Republic characters
