= List of Lucasfilm productions =

Official logo of company

This article contains a list of productions made by the American film studio Lucasfilm a subsidiary of Walt Disney Studios which is a division of Disney Entertainment, owned by The Walt Disney Company. This list includes animated television series, films, specials, and theatrical films such as Star Wars and Indiana Jones.

== Feature films ==
Year	Film	Directed by	Screenplay by	Story by	Distributor(s)	Budget	Gross
1973	American Graffiti	George Lucas	George Lucas, Gloria Katz and Willard Huyck		Universal Pictures	$777,000	$140,557,835
1977	Star Wars	George Lucas			20th Century Fox	$11,000,000	$775,398,007
1979	More American Graffiti	Bill L. Norton			Universal Pictures	$3,000,000	$15,014,674
1980	The Empire Strikes Back	Irvin Kershner	Leigh Brackett and Lawrence Kasdan	George Lucas	20th Century Fox	$33,000,000	$550,016,086
1981	Raiders of the Lost Ark	Steven Spielberg	Lawrence Kasdan	George Lucas and Philip Kaufman	Paramount Pictures	$18,000,000	$389,925,971
1983	Return of the Jedi	Richard Marquand	Lawrence Kasdan and George Lucas	George Lucas	20th Century Fox	$32,500,000	$482,466,382
1983	Twice Upon a Time	John Korty and Charles Swenson	John Korty, Charles Swenson, Suella Kennedy, and Bill Couturie	John Korty, Bill Couturié and Suella Kennedy	Warner Bros. Pictures	$3,000,000	$5,000
1984	Indiana Jones and the Temple of Doom	Steven Spielberg	Willard Huyck and Gloria Katz	George Lucas	Paramount Pictures	$28,000,000	$333,107,271
1985	Latino	Haskell Wexler			Cinecom Pictures		
1985	Mishima: A Life in Four Chapters	Paul Schrader	Leonard Schrader, Paul Schrader and Chieko Schrader	Leonard Schrader, Paul Schrader and Jun Shiragi	Warner Bros. Pictures	$5,000,000	$20,758
1986	Labyrinth	Jim Henson	Terry Jones	Dennis Lee and Jim Henson	TriStar Pictures	$27,600,000	$15,407,377
1986	Howard the Duck	Willard Huyck	Willard Huyck and Gloria Katz		Universal Pictures	$37,000,000	$37,962,774
1988	Willow	Ron Howard	Bob Dolman	George Lucas	Metro-Goldwyn-Mayer	$35,000,000	$57,272,355
1988	Tucker: The Man and His Dream	Francis Ford Coppola	Arnold Schulman and David Seidler		Paramount Pictures	$24,000,000	$19,656,113
1988	The Land Before Time	Don Bluth	Stu Krieger	Judy Freudberg and Tony Geiss	Universal Pictures	$12,000,000	$84,846,716
1989	Indiana Jones and the Last Crusade	Steven Spielberg	Jeffrey Boam	George Lucas and Menno Meyjes	Paramount Pictures	$48,000,000	$474,171,806
1994	Radioland Murders	Mel Smith	Willard Huyck, Gloria Katz, Jeff Reno, and Ron Osborn	George Lucas	Universal Pictures	$15,000,000	$1,316,865
1999	Star Wars: Episode I – The Phantom Menace	George Lucas			20th Century Fox	$115,000,000	$1,046,515,409
2002	Star Wars: Episode II – Attack of the Clones	George Lucas	George Lucas and Jonathan Hales	George Lucas	20th Century Fox	$115,000,000	$653,780,724
2005	Star Wars: Episode III – Revenge of the Sith	George Lucas			20th Century Fox	$113,000,000	$905,595,947
2008	Indiana Jones and the Kingdom of the Crystal Skull	Steven Spielberg	David Koepp	George Lucas and Jeff Nathanson	Paramount Pictures	$185,000,000	$786,636,033
2008	Star Wars: The Clone Wars	Dave Filoni	Henry Gilroy, Steven Melching and Scott Murphy		Warner Bros. Pictures	$8,500,000	$68,282,844
2012	Red Tails	Anthony Hemingway	John Ridley and Aaron McGruder	John Ridley	20th Century Fox	$58,000,000	$50,365,498
2015	Strange Magic	Gary Rydstrom	David Berenbaum, Irene Mecchi, and Gary Rydstrom	George Lucas	Walt Disney Studios Motion Pictures	$70,000,000 - $100,000,000	$13,741,343
2015	Star Wars: The Force Awakens	J. J. Abrams	Lawrence Kasdan, J. J. Abrams and Michael Arndt		Walt Disney Studios Motion Pictures	$533,200,000	$2,056,046,835
2016	Rogue One: A Star Wars Story	Gareth Edwards	Chris Weitz and Tony Gilroy	John Knoll and Gary Whitta	Walt Disney Studios Motion Pictures	$280,200,000	$1,055,083,596
2017	Star Wars: The Last Jedi	Rian Johnson			Walt Disney Studios Motion Pictures	$262,000,000	$1,322,581,071
2018	Solo: A Star Wars Story	Ron Howard	Jonathan Kasdan and Lawrence Kasdan		Walt Disney Studios Motion Pictures	$330,400,000	$393,151,347
2019	Star Wars: The Rise of Skywalker	J. J. Abrams	Chris Terrio and J. J. Abrams	Derek Connolly, Colin Trevorrow, J. J. Abrams and Chris Terrio	Walt Disney Studios Motion Pictures	$275,000,000	$1,069,951,814
2023	Indiana Jones and the Dial of Destiny	James Mangold	Jez Butterworth, John-Henry Butterworth, David Koepp and James Mangold		Walt Disney Studios Motion Pictures	$352,300,000	$383,963,057
2026	Star Wars: The Mandalorian and Grogu	Jon Favreau	Jon Favreau, Dave Filoni and Noah Kloor		Walt Disney Studios Motion Pictures	$165,000,000	$342,213,780⁹

=== Upcoming ===
Year	Film	Directed by	Screenplay by	Distributor	Status
2027	Star Wars: Starfighter	Shawn Levy	Jonathan Tropper	Walt Disney Studios; Motion Pictures	Post-production
TBA	Star Wars: Episode X	Jon Watts	Simon Kinberg	Walt Disney Studios; Motion Pictures	In development
TBA	Star Wars: Episode XI	TBA	Simon Kinberg	Walt Disney Studios; Motion Pictures	In development
TBA	Star Wars: Episode XII	TBA	Simon Kinberg	Walt Disney Studios; Motion Pictures	In development
TBA	Untitled Dave Filoni Star Wars film	Dave Filoni		Walt Disney Studios; Motion Pictures	In development
TBA	Lando	TBA	Donald Glover and Stephen Glover	Walt Disney Studios; Motion Pictures	In development
TBA	Untitled Sharmeen Obaid-Chinoy Star Wars film	Sharmeen Obaid-Chinoy	George Nolfi	Walt Disney Studios; Motion Pictures	In development
TBA	Untitled Taika Waititi Star Wars film	Taika Waititi	Taika Waititi and Tony McNamara	Walt Disney Studios; Motion Pictures	In development
TBA	Untitled James Mangold Star Wars film	James Mangold	James Mangold and Beau Willimon	Walt Disney Studios; Motion Pictures	In development
TBA	Rogue Squadron	Patty Jenkins	Patty Jenkins and Matthew Robinson	Walt Disney Studios; Motion Pictures	In development

== Television ==
=== Films and specials ===
Year(s)	Title	Creator(s) / Developer(s)	Network	Co-production with
1978	Star Wars Holiday Special	Pat Proft; Leonard Ripps; Bruce Vilanch; Rod Warren; Mitzie Welch	CBS	Smith-Hemion Productions; Winters Hollywood Entertainment Holdings Corporation; Nelvana; 20th Century-Fox Television
1984	Caravan of Courage: An Ewok Adventure	George Lucas	ABC	Korty Films
1985	Ewoks: The Battle for Endor	George Lucas	ABC	—N/a
1986	Star Wars: Droids - The Great Heep	Peter Sauder; Ben Burtt	ABC	Nelvana
1992	Defenders of Dynatron City	Gary Winnick; Steve Purcell; Howard Roffman; Cynthia Wuthmann	Fox	DIC Entertainment; LucasArts
1994	Young Indiana Jones and the Hollywood Follies	George Lucas	The Family Channel	Amblin Television; Paramount Television
1995	Young Indiana Jones and the Treasure of the Peacock's Eye	George Lucas	The Family Channel	Amblin Television; Paramount Television
1995	Young Indiana Jones and the Attack of the Hawkmen	George Lucas	The Family Channel	Amblin Television; Paramount Television
1996	Young Indiana Jones: Travels with Father	George Lucas	The Family Channel	Amblin Television; Paramount Television
2007	Robot Chicken: Star Wars	Seth Green; Matthew Senreich	Adult Swim	Sony Pictures Digital; Stoopid Monkey; ShadowMachine Films
2008	Robot Chicken: Star Wars Episode II	Seth Green; Matthew Senreich	Adult Swim	Sony Pictures Digital; Stoopid Monkey; ShadowMachine Films
2010	Robot Chicken: Star Wars Episode III	Seth Green; Matthew Senreich	Adult Swim	Sony Pictures Digital; Stoopid Monkey; ShadowMachine Films
2015	Star Wars Rebels: The Ultimate Guide	Simon Kinberg; Dave Filoni; Carrie Beck	Disney XD	
2017	Star Wars Forces of Destiny: Volume 1	Dave Filoni; Carrie Beck; Jennifer Muro	Disney XD	
2017	Star Wars Forces of Destiny: Volume 2	Dave Filoni; Carrie Beck; Jennifer Muro	Disney XD	
2018	Star Wars Forces of Destiny: Volume 3	Dave Filoni; Carrie Beck; Jennifer Muro	Disney XD	
2018	Star Wars Forces of Destiny: Volume 4	Dave Filoni; Carrie Beck; Jennifer Muro	Disney XD	
TBA	Star Wars: A Droid Story		Disney+	Industrial Light & Magic

=== Live-action series ===
Years	Title	Seasons	Creator(s) / Developer(s)	Network	Co-production with
1990–1993	Maniac Mansion	3 seasons, 66 episodes	Michael Short; Eugene Levy; David Flaherty; John Hemphill; Cliff Ruby; Elana Lesser; Bob Carrau	YTV (Canada); The Family Channel (United States)	Atlantis Films
1992–1993	The Young Indiana Jones Chronicles	2 seasons, 28 episodes	George Lucas	ABC	Amblin Television; Paramount Television
2019–2023	The Mandalorian	3 seasons, 24 episodes	Jon Favreau	Disney+	Fairview Entertainment; Golem Creations
2021–2022	The Book of Boba Fett	1 season, 7 episodes	Jon Favreau	Disney+	Fairview Entertainment; Golem Creations
2022	Obi-Wan Kenobi	1 season, 6 episodes	Joby Harold	Disney+	—N/a
2022–2025	Andor	2 seasons, 24 episodes	Tony Gilroy	Disney+	—N/a
2022–2023	Willow	1 season, 8 episodes	Jonathan Kasdan	Disney+	—N/a
2023–present	Ahsoka	2 seasons, 16 episodes	Dave Filoni	Disney+	Golem Creations
2024	The Acolyte	1 season, 8 episodes	Leslye Headland	Disney+	Shoot to Midnight
2024–2025	Star Wars: Skeleton Crew	1 season, 8 episodes	Jon Watts; Christopher Ford	Disney+	Golem Creations

=== Animated series ===
Year(s)	Title	Seasons	Creator(s) / Developer(s)	Network	Co-production with
1985	Star Wars: Droids	1 season, 13 episodes	Peter Sauder; Ben Burtt	ABC	Nelvana
1985–1986	Star Wars: Ewoks	2 seasons, 26 episodes	Paul Dini; Bob Carrau	ABC	Nelvana
2003–2005	Star Wars: Clone Wars	3 seasons, 25 episodes	Genndy Tartakovsky	Cartoon Network	Cartoon Network Studios
2008–2020	Star Wars: The Clone Wars	7 seasons, 133 episodes	George Lucas	Cartoon Network (seasons 1–5); Netflix (season 6); Disney+ (season 7)	Lucasfilm Animation; Polygon Pictures; CGCG
2014–2018	Star Wars Rebels	4 seasons, 75 episodes	Simon Kinberg; Dave Filoni; Carrie Beck	Disney XD	Lucasfilm Animation; CGCG
2018–2020	Star Wars Resistance	2 seasons, 40 episodes	Dave Filoni; Kiri Hart; Carrie Beck	Disney XD; Disney Channel	Lucasfilm Animation; Polygon Pictures; CGCG
2021–2024	Star Wars: The Bad Batch	3 seasons, 47 episodes	Dave Filoni; Jennifer Corbett	Disney+	Lucasfilm Animation; CGCG
2021–present	Star Wars: Visions	3 seasons, 27 episodes	James Waugh; Josh Rimes; Jacqui Lopez	Disney+	Vol 1: Kamikaze Douga, Studio Colorido, Geno Studio, Trigger, Kinema Citrus, Production I.G, Science Saru Vol 2: El Guiri, Aardman, Studio Mir, Studio La Cachette, 88 Pictures, D'Art Shtajio, Triggerfish Vol 3: David Production, Kamikaze Douga, Kinema Citrus, Polygon Pictures, Production I.G, Project Studio Q, Shelter: Studio, Trigger, Wit Studio
2022–2025	Star Wars Tales: Tales of the Jedi; Tales of the Empire; Tales of the Underworld	3 seasons, 18 episodes	Dave Filoni	Disney+	Lucasfilm Animation
2023–2025	Star Wars: Young Jedi Adventures	3 seasons, 55 episodes	Michael Olson; Shellie Kvilvang; Josh Rimes; James Waugh; Lamont Magee	Disney Jr. Disney+	Lucasfilm Animation; Wild Canary Animation
2026–present	Star Wars: Maul – Shadow Lord	1 season, 10 episodes	Dave Filoni; Matt Michnovetz	Disney+	Lucasfilm Animation
2026–present	Star Wars: Visions Presents: The Ninth Jedi	1 season, 8 episodes	Kenji Kamiyama	Disney+ Hulu	Production I.G
2026	Star Wars Detours	1 season, 6 episodes	George Lucas; Brendan Hay	Theatrical limited released	Lucasfilm Animation

=== Animated web-series and shorts ===
Year(s)	Title	Seasons	Creator(s) / Developer(s)	Network	Co-production with
1984	The Adventures of André & Wally B.	short	Alvy Ray Smith	—N/a	—N/a
2015	Smuggler's Run	motion comic	Greg Rucka	YouTube	Nestle
2015	The Weapon of A Jedi	motion comic	Jason Fry	YouTube	Nestle
2016	Star Wars: Go Rogue	1 season, 4 episodes	James DeJulio; Lesley Worton	YouTube	Tongal, Inc
2017	Star Wars The Force Awakens Roll Out	1 season, 3 episodes	Hideo Itoyanag	YouTube	—N/a
2017	Star Wars Blips	1 season, 8 episodes	—N/a	YouTube	—N/a
2017–2018	Star Wars Forces of Destiny	2 seasons, 32 episodes	Dave Filoni; Carrie Beck; Jennifer Muro	YouTube	Lucasfilm Animation; Ghostbot
2018	Reflections	short	—N/a	YouTube	ILMxLab
2018–2020	Star Wars Galaxy of Adventures	2 seasons, 54 episodes	Josh Rimes	YouTube	—N/a
2019–2020	Star Wars: Roll Out	1 season, 16 episodes	Hideo Itoyanag	YouTube	—N/a
2019	Star Wars The Last Jedi Roll Out	1 season, 3 episodes	Hideo Itoyanag	YouTube	—N/a
2021	Hasbro Star Wars Mission Fleet	1 season, 3 episodes	—N/a	YouTube	—N/a
2021	Star Wars: Galactic Starcruiser welcome video	short	—N/a	YouTube	—N/a
2021–2023	Star Wars: Galaxy of Creatures	2 seasons, 24 episodes	Matt Martin	YouTube	—N/a
2022	Star Wars: Galactic Pals	1 season, 12 episodes	Jason Stein	YouTube	—N/a
2022	Find your Force with Star Wars	1 season, 4 episodes	—N/a	YouTube	Headspace
2022	Star Wars X-wing Voyage	short	—N/a	Headspace	Headspace
2022	Star Wars Breathe with R2-D2	short	—N/a	Headspace	Headspace
2022	Star Wars Islands of Ahch-To	short	—N/a	Headspace	Headspace
2022	Star Wars Breathe with Yoda	short	—N/a	Headspace	Headspace
2022	Star Wars Tatooine Sunset	short	—N/a	Headspace	Headspace
2022	Star Wars Breathe with BB-8	short	—N/a	Headspace	Headspace
2022	Zen - Grogu and Dust Bunnies	short	—N/a	Disney+	Studio Ghibli
2024	How NOT to Draw R2-D2	short	—N/a	YouTube	—N/a
2024–2025	Star Wars: Fun with Nubs	1 season, 20 episodes	Josh Rimes	YouTube	—N/a
2024–2025	Grogu Cutest In The Galaxy	1 season, 16 episodes	—N/a	Instagram	—N/a
2025	HASBRO Epic STAR WARS	1 season, 3 episodes	—N/a	YouTube	—N/a
2025	Droid Diaries	1 season, 8 episodes	—N/a	YouTube	—N/a
2025–2026	Star Wars: Icons of the Force	1 season, 15 episodes	—N/a	YouTube	—N/a
2025–2026	Star Wars Minis	1 season, 28 episodes	—N/a	YouTube	—N/a
2026	Balanced Breathing with Grogu	short	—N/a	GoNoodle	—N/a
2026	Mandalorian Mission: This Is The Way	short		GoNoodle	
2026	Under the Hood with Hibi	1 season, 4 episodes		YouTube	

=== Lego animated series, specials and shorts ===
Year(s)	Title	Creator(s) / Developer(s)	Network	Co-production with
2002	Lego Star Wars: The Han Solo Affair	Tony Mines; Tim Drage	Lego.com	Spite Your Face Productions Ltd
2005	Lego Star Wars: Revenge of the Brick	Daniel Lipkowitz	Cartoon Network	Treehouse Animation; The Lego Group
2008	Lego Indiana Jones and the Raiders of the Lost Brick	Keith Malone; Thomas Sebastian Fenger; Ole Holm Christensen; Peder Pedersen	Cartoon Network	M2Film; The Lego Group
2008–present	Lego Star Wars Animated Comics Lego Star Wars Movie Shorts	—N/a	Lego.com / YouTube	M2Film; The Lego Group
2009	Lego Star Wars: The Quest for R2-D2	Daniel Lipkowitz; Michael Pratt; Keith Malone; John McCormack; Ole Holm Christensen; Peder Pedersen	Cartoon Network	M2Film; The Lego Group
2010	Lego Star Wars: Bombad Bounty	Daniel Lipkowitz	Cartoon Network	M2Film; The Lego Group
2011	Lego Star Wars: The Padawan Menace	Michael Price	Cartoon Network	Animal Logic; The Lego Group
2012	Lego Star Wars: The Empire Strikes Out	Michael Price	Cartoon Network	Animal Logic; The Lego Group
2013–2014	Lego Star Wars: The Yoda Chronicles Lego Star Wars: The New Yoda Chronicles	John McCormack; Jake Blais; Jens Kronvold Frederiksen; Henrik Welding Bjørksen; Yasin Jensen; Steve Lettieri; Robert King; Chris Conway; Kathleen Fleming; Matthew Steven Boyle; Steffen Jensen; Kurt Kristiansen; Keith Malone; Jakob Liesenfeld	Cartoon Network (season 1); Disney XD (season 2)	Wil Film ApS; The Lego Group
2014–2017	Lego Star Wars: Microfighters	—N/a	YouTube	Wil Film ApS; The Lego Group
2015	Lego Star Wars: Droid Tales	Carrie Beck; Jason Cosler; Jake Blais; Jakob Liesenfeld; Jens Kronvold Frederiksen; John McCormack; Keith Malone; Kurt Kristiansen; Mathew Steven Boyle	Disney XD	Wil Film ApS; The Lego Group
2016	Lego Star Wars: The Resistance Rises	—N/a	Disney XD	M2Film; The Lego Group
2016–2017	Lego Star Wars: The Freemaker Adventures	Bill Motz; Bob Roth; Carrie Beck; Jason Cosler; Jake Blais; John McCormack; Keith Malone; Leland Chee	Disney XD	Wil Film ApS; The Lego Group
2018	Lego Star Wars: All-Stars	Bill Motz; Bob Moth; Carrie Beck; Josh Rimes; Jason Cosler; Jake Blais; Keith Malone; Leland Chee	Disney XD	Wil Film ApS; The Lego Group
2020–2025	Lego Star Wars: Celebrate the Season	David Shayne	YouTube	M2Film; The Lego Group
2020	The Lego Star Wars Holiday Special	David Shayne; James Waugh; Jason Cosler; Josh Rimes; Leland Chee	Disney+	Atomic Cartoons; The Lego Group
2021	Lego Star Wars: Terrifying Tales	David Shayne; James Waugh; Jason Cosler; Josh Rimes; Leland Chee	Disney+	Atomic Cartoons; The Lego Group
2022	Lego Star Wars: Summer Vacation	David Shayne; James Waugh; Jason Cosler; Josh Rimes; Leland Chee	Disney+	Atomic Cartoons; The Lego Group
2024–2025	Lego Star Wars: Rebuild the Galaxy Lego Star Wars: Rebuild the Galaxy: Pieces of the Past	Dan Hernandez; Benji Samit	Disney+	Atomic Cartoons; The Lego Group
2026	Lego Star Wars: The Mandalorian	James Waugh; Josh Rimes; Jason Cosler; Michael Price	Disney+	Atomic Cartoons; The Lego Group

=== Cinematic trailers ===
Year(s)	Title	Creator(s) / Developer(s)	Network	Co-production with
2009	Star Wars: The Old Republic "Deceived"	Dave Wilson	YouTube	BioWare; LucasArts; Blur Studio
2010	Star Wars: The Old Republic "Hope"	Dave Wilson	YouTube	BioWare; LucasArts; Blur Studio
2010	Star Wars: The Force Unleashed II "Betrayal"	Dave Wilson	YouTube	LucasArts; Blur Studio
2011	Star Wars: The Old Republic "Return"	Dave Wilson	YouTube	BioWare; LucasArts; Blur Studio
2015	Star Wars Battlefront "Reveal Trailer"		YouTube	DICE; Electronic Arts; Lucasfilm
2015	Star Wars: The Old Republic "Sacrifice"	Dave Wilson	YouTube	BioWare; LucasArts; Blur Studio
2016	Star Wars: The Old Republic "Betrayed"	Dave Wilson	YouTube	BioWare; LucasArts; Blur Studio
2017	Star Wars Battlefront II "Reveal Trailer"		YouTube	DICE; Electronic Arts; Lucasfilm
2019	Star Wars Jedi: Fallen Order "Reveal Trailer"	Stig Asmussen	YouTube	Respawn Entertainment; Electronic Arts; Lucasfilm
2020	Star Wars: Squadrons "Reveal Trailer"	Neel Upadhye	YouTube	Motive Studio; Electronic Arts; Industrial Light & Magic
2020	Star Wars: Squadrons "Hunted"	Neel Upadhye	YouTube	Motive Studio; Electronic Arts; Industrial Light & Magic
2021	Star Wars: Knights of the Old Republic — Remake "Reveal Trailer"		YouTube	Aspyr; Sony Interactive Entertainment; Lucasfilm Games
2021	Star Wars: Hunters "Welcome to the Arena"		YouTube	Zynga; Lucasfilm Games
2021	Star Wars Eclipse "Reveal Trailer"		YouTube	Quantic Dream; Lucasfilm Games
2022	Star Wars: The Old Republic "Disorder"	Dave Wilson	YouTube	BioWare; Lucasfilm Games; Industrial Light & Magic
2022	Star Wars Jedi: Survivor "Teaser"		YouTube	Respawn Entertainment; Electronic Arts; Lucasfilm
2023	Star Wars Outlaws "World Premiere Trailer"		YouTube	Massive Entertainment; Ubisoft; Lucasfilm Games; Platige Image
2025	Star Wars Zero Company "Announce Trailer"		YouTube	Bit Reactor; Respawn Entertainment; Electronic Arts; Lucasfilm Games
2025	Star Wars: Fate of the Old Republic "Teaser"	Casey Hudson	YouTube	Arcanaut Studios; Lucasfilm Games
2025	Star Wars: Galactic Racer "World Premiere Trailer"		YouTube	Fuse Games; Secret Mode; Lucasfilm Games

== Documentaries ==
Year(s)	Title	Notes
Star Wars
1977	The Making of Star Wars	Produced as The Star Wars Corporation; in association with 20th Century Fox TV
1980	SP FX: The Empire Strikes Back	Documentary
1982	Return of the Ewok	Mockumentary short
1983	Classic Creatures: Return of the Jedi	Produced in association with 20th Century Fox TV
1983	From Star Wars to Jedi: The Making of a Saga	Produced in association with 20th Century Fox TV
1997	Anatomy of a Dewback	Behind-the-scenes web documentary
1997	Star Wars Special Edition	Documentaries for Star Wars Trilogy: Special Edition VHS
1998–1999	The Phantom Menace: Web Documentaries	Online documentary series
2000	Star Wars Episode II – The Saga Continues	Promo Attack of the Clones for Original Trilogy VHS edition
2001	R2-D2: Beneath the Dome	Mockumentary short
2001	The Beginning: Making Episode I	Produced for The Phantom Menace DVD edition
2001–2002	Making of Episode II: Web Documentaries	Online documentary series
2002	Films Are Not Released, They Escape	Produced for Attack of the Clones DVD edition
2002	From Puppets to Pixels: Digital Characters in Episode II	Produced for Attack of the Clones DVD edition
2002	State of the Art: The Pre-Visualization of Episode II	Produced for Attack of the Clones DVD edition
2004	Empire of Dreams: The Story of the Star Wars Trilogy	Produced with Prometheus Entertainment for Original Trilogy DVD edition
2004	The Birth of the Lightsaber	Produced for Original Trilogy DVD edition
2004	The Characters of Star Wars	Produced for Original Trilogy DVD edition
2004	The Force Is with Them: The Legacy of Star Wars	Produced for Original Trilogy DVD edition
2004	The Story of Star Wars	Produced for Original Trilogy DVD edition
2005	Clone Wars: Bridging the Saga	Produced for Clone Wars: Vol I DVD edition
2005	Clone Wars: Connecting the Dots	Produced for Clone Wars: Vol I DVD edition
2005	Star Wars Episode III: Becoming Obi-Wan	Produced for Revenge of the Sith DVD edition
2005	Within a Minute: The Making of Episode III	Produced for Revenge of the Sith DVD edition
2005	The Chosen One	Produced for Revenge of the Sith DVD edition
2005	It's All for Real: The Stunts of Episode III	Produced for Revenge of the Sith DVD edition
2005	Star Wars Heroes and Villains	Produced for Revenge of the Sith DVD edition
2005	Revenge of the Sith: Web Documentaries	Online documentary series
2005	Science of Star Wars	Produced with Discovery Channel
2007	Star Wars Tech	Produced with Prometheus Entertainment/The History Channel
2007	Star Wars: The Legacy Revealed	Produced with Prometheus Entertainment/The History Channel
2007	Star Warriors	Produced with Prometheus Entertainment
2010	A Conversation with the Masters: The Empire Strikes Back 30 Years Later	A 30th-anniversary making-of retrospective for The Empire Strikes Back
2014–2018	Rebels Recon	Behind-the-scenes web series for Star Wars Rebels
2016	Secrets of the Force Awakens: A Cinematic Journey	Produced for The Force Awakens Blu-ray edition
2017	Science and Star Wars	Educational series in association with IBM
2017	The Stories: The Making of Rogue One: A Star Wars Story	10 featurettes produced for Rogue One Blu-ray edition
2018	The Director and the Jedi	Produced for The Last Jedi Blu-ray edition
2020	The Skywalker Legacy	Produced for The Rise of Skywalker Blu-ray edition
2020–2023	Disney Gallery: The Mandalorian	Documentary series on Disney+
2021	Under the Helmet: The Legacy of Boba Fett	Disney+ documentary
2021–2025	Star Wars: Visions Filmmaker Focus	Behind-the-scenes Disney+ series for Star Wars Visions
2022	Disney Gallery: The Book of Boba Fett	Disney+ documentary
2022	Obi-Wan Kenobi: A Jedi's Return	Disney+ documentary
2022	Andor: A Disney+ Day Special Look	Disney+ documentary short
2022–2025	Light & Magic	Produced with Imagine Documentaries/Kasdan Pictures for Disney+
2023	Master & Apprentice: Making of Ahsoka	Disney+ documentary
2024	Star Wars: Skeleton Crew: A Special Look	Disney+ documentary short
2025	Andor Season 2: A Special Look	Disney+ documentary short
2025	Andor Declassified	Documentary series on Disney+
2026	The Mandalorian and Grogu: A Special Look	Disney+ documentary short
2026	The Mandalorian and Grogu: Official Podcast	Documentary series on Disney+
2027	The Hero Awakens	Disney+ documentary
Indiana Jones and other franchises
1981	The Making of Raiders of the Lost Ark	Documentary premiered on PBS
1985	The Making of Indiana Jones and the Temple of Doom	Documentary premiered on PBS
1986	The Making of "Captain Eo"	Documentary
1999	The Adventures of Young Indiana Jones: A Look Inside	Documentaries featurette for The Complete Adventures of Indiana Jones VHS edittion
1999	Indiana Jones and the Temple of Doom: A Look Inside	Documentaries featurette for The Complete Adventures of Indiana Jones VHS edittion
1999	Indiana Jones and the Raiders of the Lost Ark: A Look Inside	Documentaries featurette for The Complete Adventures of Indiana Jones VHS edittion
1999	Indiana Jones and the Last Crusade: A Look Inside	Documentaries featurette for The Complete Adventures of Indiana Jones VHS edittion
2007–2008	The Adventures of Young Indiana Jones Documentaries	97-part historical documentary series produced for The Adventures of Young Indiana Jones DVD box set
2008	Production Diary: Making of The Kingdom of the Crystal Skull	Produced for Kingdom of the Crystal Skull DVD edition
2008	Warrior Make-up	Produced for Kingdom of the Crystal Skull DVD edition
2008	Indiana Jones and the Ultimate Quest	Produced with The History Channel
2012	On Set with Raiders of the Lost Ark	Produced for Indiana Jones Blu-ray edition
2015	Creating The Magic	Produced for Strange Magic DVD edition
2015	Magical Mash Up: Outtakes, Tests and Melodies	Produced for Strange Magic DVD edition
2023	Indiana Jones and the Dial of Destiny: A Special Look	Disney+ documentary short
2023	Willow: Behind The Magic	Disney+ documentary
2023	Timeless Heroes: Indiana Jones and Harrison Ford	Disney+ documentary
2025	Indiana Jones Adventure	Disney+ documentary short
Other productions
1968	Filmmaker	Documentary short; directed by George Lucas (nominal credit)
1990	Wow!	Educational/special production
2012	Manifest Destiny	Documentary
2012	Double Victory: The Tuskegee Airmen at War	Introduction to the history that inspired feature film Red Tails
2013	Kathleen Kennedy 2013 Pioneer of the Year Award Tribute Reel	Tribute reel
2022	More than Robots	Disney+ documentary
2024	Music by John Williams	Disney+ documentary; produced with Amblin Documentaries, Imagine Documentaries, and Nedland Media
Video games featurettes
2001	Star Wars: Starfighter, the Making of the Game	Video game documentary
2004	Making the Game: 'Star Wars: Episode III – Revenge of the Sith'	Produced for Original Trilogy DVD edition
2008	Spike TV segments: The Force Unleashed	Promotional segments
2008	A New Chapter: The Story of 'The Force Unleashed'	Game narrative documentary
2008	Unleashing the Tech: The Power Behind the Force	Technical featurette
2008	The TFU Experience: Unleashing the Force on Your Favorite Console	Console port featurette
2008	Unleashing the Force, Part 1: The New Beginning	Game documentary; Also distributor
2008	A Force Wrecking Ball, Part 2: The Characters of "The Force Unleashed"	Game documentary

== Other productions ==
=== Unscripted series ===
Year(s)	Title	Notes
2009–2011	Galactic Timeline	Promote series for Star Wars: The Old Republic
2012–2020	Clone Wars Download	
2013	Words with Warwick	Produced as The Star Wars Corporation.
2014	Holonet News	Promote series for Star Wars: Rebels
2016	The Star Wars After Show	Weekly variety web series
2016–2020	The Star Wars Show	Weekly variety web series
2018–2019	The Star Wars Show Extra	Weekly variety web series
2018–2019	Resistance Rewind	
2018–2020	Bucket's List	
2018–2020	Star Wars: Galaxy of Adventures Fun Facts	Educational shorts accompanying the animated series.
2018–2020	Our Star Wars Stories	Documentary series profiling Star Wars fans.
2019–2020	Star Wars By the Numbers	
2019–2020	Let's Make Star Wars	Craft tutorial series.
2019–2020	Let's Draw Star Wars	Art tutorial series.
2019–2020	Star Wars In Under Five Minutes	
2019–2020	Galactic Builders	
2020	The Clone Wars Bucket List	
2020	The Star Wars Show Book Club	Weekly variety web series
2020	Star Wars: Jedi Temple Challenge	Children's game show hosted by Ahmed Best.
2020–2025	This Week! in Star Wars	Weekly news and retrospective show.
2021	Star Wars: Much to Learn	
2021–2022	Star Wars Full Circle	
2021–2022	Star Wars A to Z	
2021–2022	Star Wars: List It!	
2021–2022	Star Wars Wise Words	
2021–2022	Characters of High Republic	Short-form lore and character profiles.
2021–2022	The High Republic Show	Bi-monthly series focused on the publishing initiative.
2022	Dispatches from the Halcyon	
2022	Star Wars Mindful Matters	
2022–2025	Lightsaber Academy	
2022–2026	Star Wars Lofi	
2023	This Week! in Indiana Jones	Special news series for The Dial of Destiny.
2023	Lucasfilm Lofi	
2023	Star Wars Kids: Relax	
2025–2026	The Original Story Celebrated	Series related with Minis.
2025–present	Star Wars Ambiance	
2026	Behind The Scenes Celebration	Series related with Minis.
2026	Lightsaber Legends	
2026	Star Wars Illustrated	
2026	Star Wars: Galaxy Guide	
2026	Star Wars: Worldbuilding	

=== Events, promotions and miscellaneous ===
Year(s)	Title	Notes
2002	Star Wars: Connections	Educational special
2007	Star Wars at 30	Anniversary documentary; Distributor
2007	You Can Draw 'Star Wars'	Produced with Dorling Kindersley Vision
2007	The Fan Film	Distributor
2008	Star Wars: The Clone Wars Preview Special	Television special
2009	The Star Wars Comic-Con 09 Spectacular	Event special
2009	The Making of Star Wars: In Concert	Concert documentary
2012	Transmission CVI: August 23, 2012	Event stream coverage
2012	Forceclash	Promotional content
2014	Clash at the Cantina	Promotional short
2015	Star Wars: Launch Bay—Meet the Makers	Attraction documentary
2015	Star Wars: The Force Awakens World Premiere Red Carpet	Premiere coverage
2015–present	Star Wars Celebration Streams	Live event coverage
2016	RiffTrax: Star Wars: The Force Awakens	Comedic commentary
2016	Daisy Ridley Exclusive Q&A	Promotional Q&A
2016	Rogue One: A Star Wars Story – World Premiere	Premiere coverage
2016	Rogue One: Recon—A Star Wars 360 Experience	Virtual reality short
2017	Live from the Red Carpet: The Last Jedi	Premiere coverage
2018	Live from the Red Carpet: Solo	Premiere coverage
2018	RiffTrax: Star Wars: The Last Jedi	Comedic commentary
2019	Live from the Red Carpet of Star Wars: The Rise of Skywalker	Premiere coverage
2019	Come Behind the Scenes of Star Wars: The Rise of Skywalker	Promotional featurette
2021	Star Wars Galaxy of Sounds	Disney+ ambient series
2021	Vehicle Flythroughs	Disney+ ambient series
2021	Star Wars: Biomes	Disney+ ambient series
2027	Star Wars Funday Football	Alternate broadcast for the Super Bowl LXI

=== Theme park attractions ===
Year(s)	Title	Notes
1986	Captain EO	3D film attraction for Disney Parks.
1986	Captain EO Promo & Pre-show	Video show before the "Captain EO" attraction
1987	Star Tours	Motion simulator attraction in collaboration with Walt Disney Imagineering.
1994	ExtraTERRORestrial Alien Encounter	Produced original media for the Tomorrowland attraction.
1995	Indiana Jones Adventure: Temple of the Forbidden Eye	Enhanced motion vehicle dark ride.
2011	Star Tours: The Adventures Continue	3D randomized motion simulator update.
2015	Star Wars: Path of the Jedi	Cinematic montage attraction.

=== Music videos ===
Year(s)	Title	Notes
1983	"Lapti Nek"	The music video from Jabba's Palace promoted Return of the Jedi.
1991	"Rush Rush"	Music video by Paula Abdul.
1991	"Change (US version)"	Music video by Lisa Stansfield.
1991	"You Said, You Said"	Music video by Jermaine Jackson.
1991	"Vibeology"	Music video by Paula Abdul.
1991	Simply Mad About the Mouse	Music video anthology.
1992	"Giving Him Something He Can Feel"	Music video by En Vogue.
1999	"The Duel of the Fates"	Promo music video promoted The Phantom Menace.
2005	Star Wars: A Musical Journey	Musical anthology for Revenge of the Sith DVD edition.
2024	"Sing and Dance Along with Nubs"	Promo music video promoted Star Wars: Youg Jedi Adventures
2024	"Youngee Wim (Bunky Dunko)"	Lyric video promoted Star Wars: Skeleton Crew.
2026	"Jump to Hyperspace!"	Music video by Lego Star Wars and GoNoodle.
