= List of Star Wars films =

Star Wars films
- Directed by: George Lucas (IV, I–III); Irvin Kershner (V); Richard Marquand (VI); Dave Filoni (TCW); J. J. Abrams (VII, IX); Rian Johnson (VIII); Gareth Edwards (RO); Ron Howard (Solo); Jon Favreau (TMaG); Shawn Levy (SF)
- Based on: Characters created by George Lucas
- Produced by: Gary Kurtz (IV–V); Howard Kazanjian (VI); Rick McCallum (I–III); Catherine Winder (TCW); Kathleen Kennedy (VII–IX, RO, Solo, TMaG, SF); J. J. Abrams (VII, IX); Bryan Burk (VII); Allison Shearmur (RO, Solo); Simon Emanuel (RO, Solo); Ram Bergman (VIII); Michelle Rejwan (IX); Jon Favreau (TMaG); Dave Filoni (TMaG); Shawn Levy (SF)
- Production companies: Lucasfilm; Lucasfilm Animation; Bad Robot (VII, IX); Fairview Entertainment (TMaG); 21 Laps Entertainment (SF)
- Distributed by: 20th Century Fox (1977–2005); Warner Bros. Pictures (TCW, 2008) (Note: Following the Walt Disney Studios's acquisition of Lucasfilm and the Star Wars film rights for their future sequels on December 21, 2012, as of 2019 to the present day, the film's distribution rights were transferred from Warner Bros. Pictures to Walt Disney Studios Motion Pictures.); Walt Disney Studios Motion Pictures (2015–present) (Note: 20th Century Fox was the original studio that distributed the first six Star Wars movies upon their release. In 2012, Lucasfilm became a subdivision of The Walt Disney Company, releasing the new film The Force Awakens in 2015, distributed by Disney. Nonetheless, Fox retained the distribution rights for the original Star Wars for perpetuity and to the rest of the films until May 2020 as of the original deal. Disney obtained full distribution rights as a result of an acquisition of 21st Century Fox in 2019.)
- Release date: 1977–present
- Country: United States
- Language: English
- Budget: Total (13 films): $2.518 billion
- Box office: Total (13 films): $10.757 billion

The Star Wars franchise includes multiple live-action and animated films set within its fictional universe. The series was initially created as a trilogy set in medias res (partway through the plot) that was later expanded into a trilogy of trilogies, known as the "Skywalker Saga".

The original 1977 film Star Wars (later subtitled Episode IV – A New Hope) was followed by the sequels Episode V – The Empire Strikes Back (1980) and Episode VI – Return of the Jedi (1983); these films form the original trilogy. (Note: The original trilogy was typically marketed without episode numbers, and in the case of the later two entries, the franchise title often played a minimal role.) Beginning sixteen years later, the prequel trilogy was released, consisting of Episode I – The Phantom Menace (1999), Episode II – Attack of the Clones (2002), and Episode III – Revenge of the Sith (2005). (Note: The prequel trilogy marketing uniquely emphasized the episode number as part of the title.) After creator George Lucas sold Lucasfilm to Disney in 2012, a sequel trilogy consisting of Episodes VII–IX was released, individually titled The Force Awakens (2015), The Last Jedi (2017), and The Rise of Skywalker (2019). (Note: The sequel trilogy marketing generally excluded episode numbers but used the Star Wars logo as part of the title.)

The first three spin-off films produced were the made-for-television Star Wars Holiday Special (1978), The Ewok Adventure (1984) and Ewoks: The Battle for Endor (1985). Following Disney's 2012 acquisition of the franchise, the only works considered officially canon were the episodic films, the animated Star Wars: The Clone Wars film (2008) and its television series continuation, as well as future films and TV series. In 2016 and 2018, Rogue One and Solo: A Star Wars Story were released, both set between the original and prequel trilogies. In 2026, The Mandalorian and Grogu was released as a continuation of the similarly titled television series, both set after the original trilogy. Star Wars: Starfighter, set after the sequel trilogy, is scheduled for May 2027, and several other potential films have been announced.

The combined box office revenue of the films amounts to over US$10 billion, and it is currently the third-highest-grossing film franchise. The major live-action releases (including all of the films of the Skywalker Saga) were nominated for Academy Awards. The original film was nominated for most of the major categories, including Best Picture, Best Director, Best Original Screenplay, and Best Supporting Actor for Alec Guinness (who played Obi-Wan Kenobi), while all theatrical live-action films have been nominated for particular categories. A number of unproduced projects were reported or announced but did not enter development.

== Skywalker Saga ==
The main Star Wars film series is a trilogy of subtrilogies; as it neared completion, Lucasfilm began to refer to it as the "Skywalker Saga". (Note: Previously, Lucas had referred to the first six episodic films of the franchise as "the [T]ragedy of Darth Vader".) It was released beginning with the original trilogy (Episodes IV, V, and VI, 1977–1983), followed by the prequel trilogy (Episodes I, II, and III, 1999–2005) and the sequel trilogy (Episodes VII, VIII, and IX, 2015–2019). (Note: The first two trilogies were released on three-year intervals, the sequel trilogy films two years apart.) The first film released, Star Wars (1977), is the fourth film chronologically and was later subtitled Episode IV – A New Hope in 1981. The saga begins chronologically with Episode I – The Phantom Menace (1999) and concludes with Episode IX – The Rise of Skywalker (2019).

The story follows each generation of the Force-sensitive Skywalker family and their struggle against Palpatine, an evil Sith Lord known as Darth Sidious. The prequel trilogy focuses on Anakin Skywalker's time as a Jedi under Obi-Wan Kenobi, marriage to Padmé Amidala, and fall to the dark side as Darth Vader. The original trilogy follows Anakin and Padmé's children Luke Skywalker and Princess Leia, who join forces with Han Solo and the Rebel Alliance against Vader and Palpatine's Empire. The sequel trilogy features Kylo Ren (Ben Solo)—Leia and Han's son—who fell to the dark side and seeks to rule the First Order with Rey, Palpatine's granddaughter and the Skywalkers' last Jedi apprentice.

Each episodic film begins with an opening crawl, accompanied by the main Star Wars theme by John Williams, who composed each film's score. Following their initial theatrical releases, franchise creator George Lucas made multiple rounds of retroactive changes to the films of the original trilogy (and to a lesser extent, the prequels).

Star Wars (Skywalker Saga) films
Film	U.S. release date	Directed by	Screenplay by	Story by	Produced by	Composer	Refs
Original trilogy
Episode IV – A New Hope	May 25, 1977	George Lucas	George Lucas	George Lucas	Gary Kurtz	John Williams	
Episode V – The Empire Strikes Back	May 21, 1980	Irvin Kershner	Leigh Brackett and Lawrence Kasdan	George Lucas	Gary Kurtz	John Williams	
Episode VI – Return of the Jedi	May 25, 1983	Richard Marquand	Lawrence Kasdan and George Lucas	George Lucas	Howard Kazanjian	John Williams	
Prequel trilogy
Episode I – The Phantom Menace	May 19, 1999	George Lucas	George Lucas	George Lucas	Rick McCallum	John Williams	
Episode II – Attack of the Clones	May 16, 2002	George Lucas	George Lucas and Jonathan Hales	George Lucas	Rick McCallum	John Williams	
Episode III – Revenge of the Sith	May 19, 2005	George Lucas	George Lucas	George Lucas	Rick McCallum	John Williams	
Sequel trilogy
Episode VII – The Force Awakens	December 18, 2015	J. J. Abrams	J. J. Abrams, Lawrence Kasdan and Michael Arndt	J. J. Abrams, Lawrence Kasdan and Michael Arndt	Kathleen Kennedy, J. J. Abrams and Bryan Burk	John Williams	
Episode VIII – The Last Jedi	December 15, 2017	Rian Johnson	Rian Johnson	Rian Johnson	Kathleen Kennedy and Ram Bergman	John Williams	
Episode IX – The Rise of Skywalker	December 20, 2019	J. J. Abrams	Chris Terrio and J. J. Abrams	Derek Connolly, Colin Trevorrow, J. J. Abrams and Chris Terrio	Kathleen Kennedy, J. J. Abrams and Michelle Rejwan	John Williams	

== Standalone films ==
As Lucas was outlining a trilogy of trilogies, he also imagined making additional movies unrelated to the Skywalker Saga. The first films set outside the main episodic series were the Ewok spin-off films Caravan of Courage: An Ewok Adventure (1984) and Ewoks: The Battle for Endor (1985). The films were screened internationally after being produced for television.

After the conclusion of his six-episode saga in 2005, Lucas returned to spin-offs in the form of television series. An animated film, The Clone Wars (2008), was released as a prelude to the TV series of the same name. An anthology series set between the main episodes entered development in parallel to the production of the sequel trilogy, described by Disney chief financial officer (CFO) Jay Rasulo as origin stories. The first entry, Rogue One: A Star Wars Story (2016), tells the story of the rebels who steal the Death Star plans directly before Episode IV. Solo: A Star Wars Story (2018) focuses on Han's backstory, also featuring Chewbacca and Lando Calrissian.

=== Animated film ===
Star Wars animated films
Film	U.S. release date	Directed by	Screenplay by	Produced by	Composer	Refs
The Clone Wars	August 15, 2008	Dave Filoni	Henry Gilroy, Steven Melching, and Scott Murphy	Catherine Winder	Kevin Kiner	

==== The Clone Wars (2008) ====
Preceding the airing of the animated TV series in late 2008, the theatrical feature Star Wars: The Clone Wars was compiled from episodes "almost [as] an afterthought." It reveals that Anakin trained an apprentice named Ahsoka Tano between Attack of the Clones and Revenge of the Sith; the series explains her absence from the latter film. The film and series exist in the same level of canon as the episodic and anthology films.

=== Live-action films ===
Star Wars live-action films
Film	U.S. release date	Directed by	Screenplay by	Story by	Produced by	Composer	Refs
Rogue One: A Star Wars Story	December 16, 2016	Gareth Edwards	Chris Weitz and Tony Gilroy	John Knoll and Gary Whitta	Kathleen Kennedy, Allison Shearmur, and Simon Emanuel	Michael Giacchino	
Solo: A Star Wars Story	May 25, 2018	Ron Howard	Jonathan Kasdan and Lawrence Kasdan	Jonathan Kasdan and Lawrence Kasdan	Kathleen Kennedy, Allison Shearmur, and Simon Emanuel	John Powell	
The Mandalorian and Grogu	May 22, 2026	Jon Favreau	Jon Favreau, Dave Filoni & Noah Kloor	Jon Favreau, Dave Filoni & Noah Kloor	Jon Favreau, Dave Filoni, Kathleen Kennedy and Ian Bryce	Ludwig Göransson	

Before selling Lucasfilm to Disney in 2012, and parallel to his development of a sequel trilogy, George Lucas and original trilogy co-screenwriter Lawrence Kasdan started development on a standalone film about a young Han Solo. In February 2013, Disney CEO Bob Iger made public the development of a Kasdan film and Entertainment Weekly reported that it would focus on Han Solo. Disney CFO Jay Rasulo has described the standalone films as origin stories. Lucasfilm president Kathleen Kennedy confirmed that there was "no attempt being made to carry characters (from the standalone films) in and out of the saga episodes." The standalone films are subtitled "A Star Wars Story".

==== Rogue One: A Star Wars Story (2016) ====
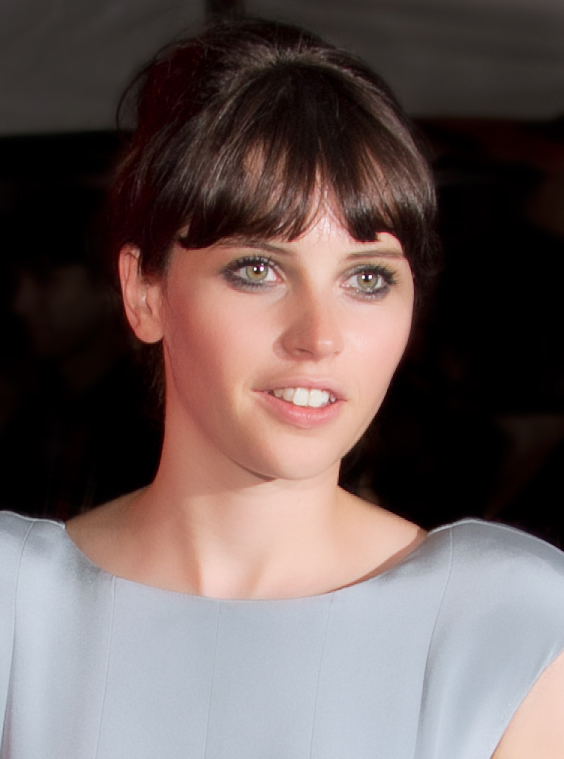
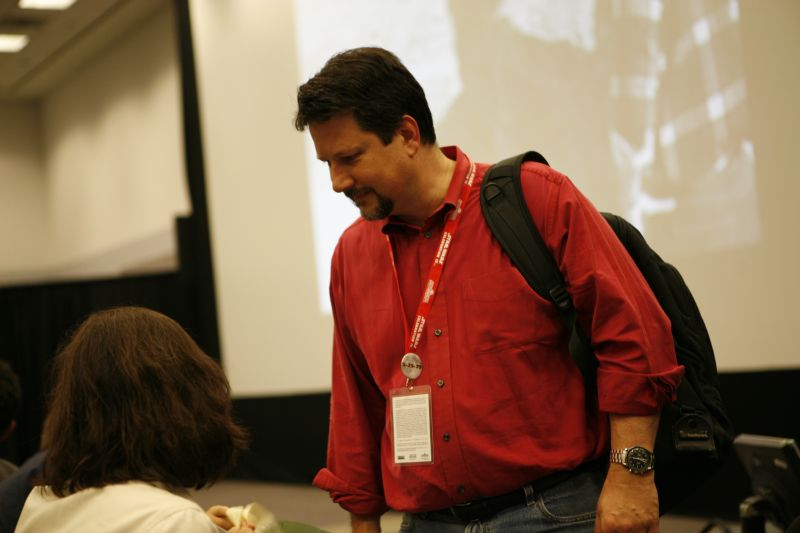
Felicity Jones, the lead of Rogue One, and John Knoll, who supervised the visual effects of the prequels pitched the plot of Rogue One

Rogue One is set directly before Episode IV: A New Hope and focuses on the eponymous group of rebels who obtain the plans to the Death Star. Its laser was developed by scientist Galen Erso (played by Mads Mikkelsen) after the Empire forcibly abducted him, separating him from his daughter Jyn. Galen secretly sends a defecting Imperial pilot, Bodhi Rook, to deliver a message warning of the weapon's existence and revealing its weakness to his rebel friend Saw Gerrera. Under the false promise of her father's liberation, Jyn agrees to help Rebel Alliance intelligence officer Cassian Andor and his droid K-2SO retrieve the message from Saw, now the paranoid leader of an extremist cell of rebels.

The idea for the movie came from John Knoll, the chief creative officer of Industrial Light & Magic. In May 2014, Lucasfilm announced Gareth Edwards as the director of an anthology film, with Gary Whitta writing the first draft for a release on December 16, 2016. The film's title was revealed to be Rogue One, with Chris Weitz rewriting the script, and Felicity Jones in the starring role. Ben Mendelsohn and Diego Luna also play new characters, with James Earl Jones returning to voice Darth Vader. Edwards stated, "It comes down to a group of individuals who don't have magical powers that have to somehow bring hope to the galaxy." The film was the first to feature characters introduced in animated Star Wars TV series, namely The Clone Wars' Saw Gerrera, portrayed by Forest Whitaker in the film. The movie received generally positive reviews, with its performances, action sequences, soundtrack, visual effects and darker tone being praised. The film grossed over US$500 million worldwide within a week of its release.

==== Solo: A Star Wars Story (2018) ====
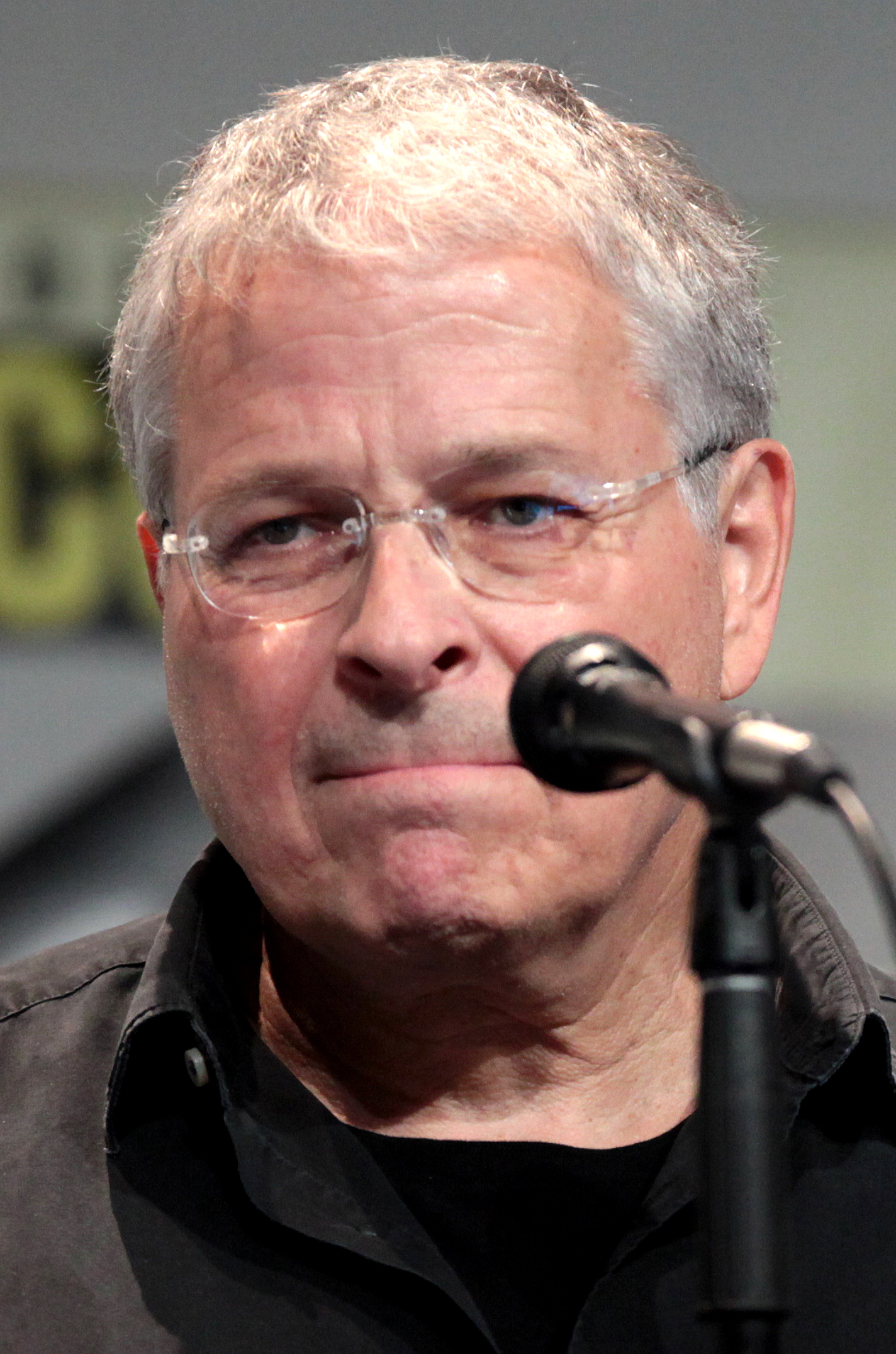
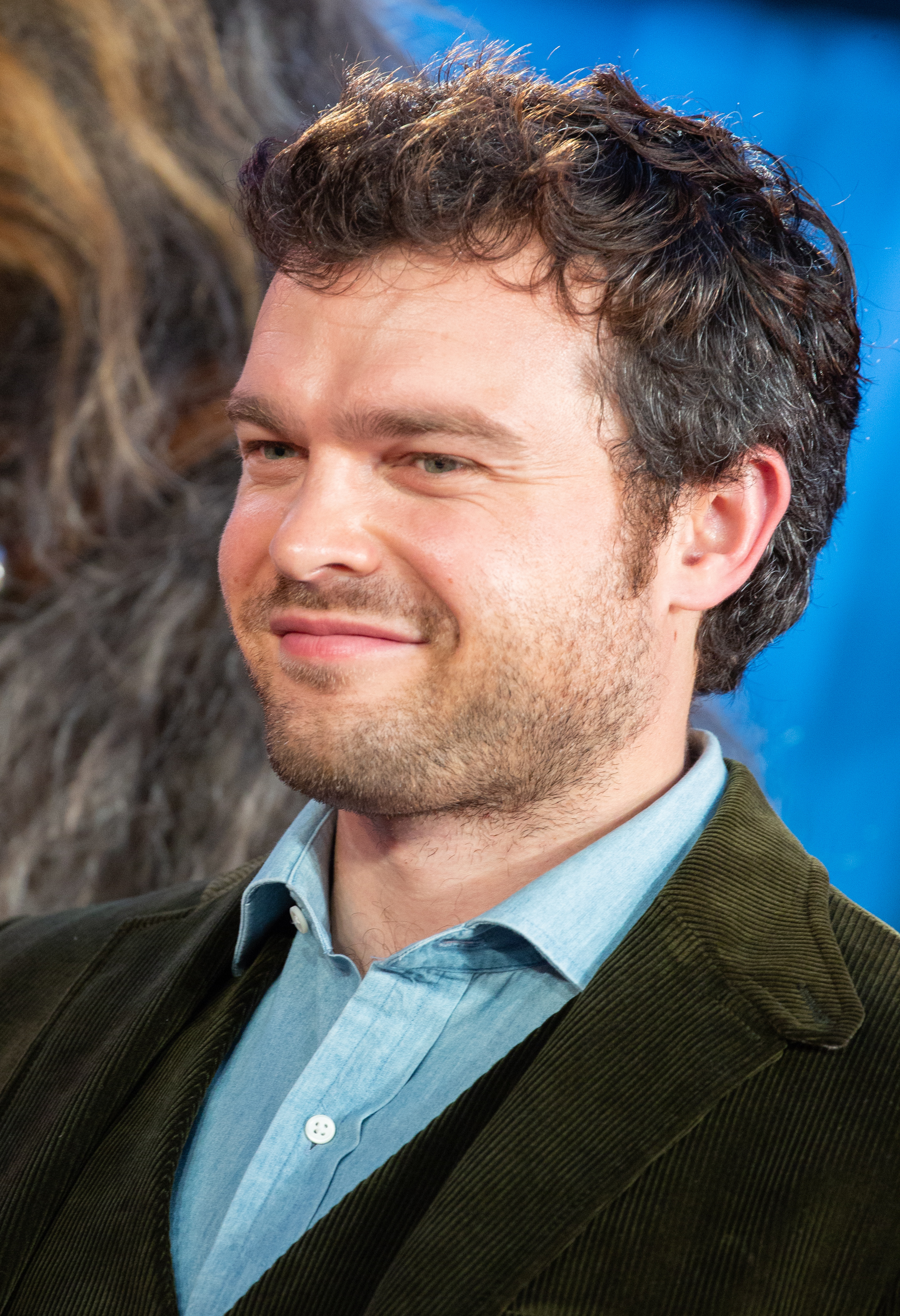
Lawrence Kasdan, who co-wrote Episodes V–VII and Solo, and Alden Ehrenreich, who plays young Han Solo

Solo, the second anthology film, focuses on Han Solo about 10 years before A New Hope. After an escape attempt from his Imperial-occupied home planet of Corellia goes wrong, a young Han vows to return to rescue his girlfriend Qi'ra. Han "Solo" joins the Imperial Academy; however, he is expelled for his reckless behavior. Han and his newfound Wookiee friend Chewbacca resort to a criminal life, mentored by veteran smuggler Tobias Beckett. After angering gangster Dryden Vos, for whom Qi'ra now works, Han and his company's lives depend on pulling a heist for him. Without a ship to travel, they hire Lando Calrissian, the captain and owner of the Millennium Falcon. A twist ending acknowledges Maul's survival of The Phantom Menace, as previously explored by animated series.

Before selling Lucasfilm to Disney, George Lucas had hired Star Wars original trilogy veteran Lawrence Kasdan to write a film about a young Han Solo. The film stars Alden Ehrenreich as a young Han Solo, Joonas Suotamo as Chewbacca (after serving as a double for the character in The Force Awakens and The Last Jedi), Donald Glover as Lando Calrissian, Emilia Clarke as Qi'ra, and Woody Harrelson as Beckett. Lucasfilm originally hired Phil Lord and Christopher Miller to direct, although they later left their position and were fired during principal photography, and replaced by Ron Howard.

==== Star Wars: The Mandalorian and Grogu (2026) ====
In 2019, then–Walt Disney Studios CCO Alan Horn stated that if The Mandalorian was successful, a feature film spin-off would be considered. A fourth season of the TV series was written from May 2022 to February 2023. Pre-production occurred in April 2023. Filming for the season was scheduled to begin in September, but was delayed due to the 2023 Hollywood labor disputes. In January 2024, it was announced that series creator Jon Favreau would write and direct a theatrical film based on the series (separate from Filoni's upcoming film), titled The Mandalorian and Grogu. Filming was expected to begin later in 2024 as the first Star Wars film to enter production since The Rise of Skywalker. In February 2024, Disney CEO Bob Iger announced that the film is aiming for a 2026 release, although specifics were not given at the time. In April 2024, it was announced that the film would be released on May 22, 2026.

== Future theatrical films ==
A release hiatus of six and a half years followed 2019's The Rise of Skywalker, during which time various release dates were delayed or scrapped, in part due to the COVID-19 pandemic and the 2023 Writers Guild of America strike. In May 2023, Kennedy said future Star Wars films would come out "when they're ready", citing the 3-to-4-year interim of more recent James Bond films. A December 2027 date has been reported with no known cancellation. (Note: Before her departure from Lucasfilm, Kennedy stated that upcoming films would include the trademark opening crawl.) (Note: Kennedy stated in May 2022 that "There's a couple of [filmmakers] that we've been in conversation with ... that I'm hoping will" oversee future films in the way that Favreau and Filoni have done for Star Wars television series.)

Star Wars future films
Film	U.S. release date	Directed by	Screenplay by	Produced by	Status	Composer	Refs
Star Wars: Starfighter	May 28, 2027	Shawn Levy	Jonathan Tropper	Kathleen Kennedy and Shawn Levy	Post-production	Thomas Newman	
Untitled Sharmeen Obaid-Chinoy film	TBA	Sharmeen Obaid-Chinoy	George Nolfi	Kathleen Kennedy	In development	TBA	
Untitled Dave Filoni film	TBA	Dave Filoni	Dave Filoni	Kathleen Kennedy and Jon Favreau	In development	TBA	
Untitled James Mangold film	TBA	James Mangold	James Mangold & Beau Willimon	Kathleen Kennedy	In development	TBA	
Untitled Jon Watts film	TBA	Jon Watts	Simon Kinberg	Kathleen Kennedy and Simon Kinberg	In development	TBA	

=== Star Wars: Starfighter (2027) ===
In November 2022, Deadline Hollywood reported that Shawn Levy was in talks to direct a Star Wars film, following his work on Deadpool & Wolverine (2024) and the fifth and final season of Stranger Things. In September 2023, Levy revealed that development had begun but had stalled due to the 2023 Writers Guild of America strike. In July 2024, it was reported that Jonathan Tropper (who wrote Levy's The Adam Project) would write the film's screenplay. In January 2025, Ryan Gosling entered talks to star in the film. It was also reported that Gosling's interest in the project accelerated it to become the next Star Wars film to enter production after The Mandalorian and Grogu. In February 2025, Kathleen Kennedy acknowledged the film's existence and development status, confirming it would be released after The Mandalorian and Grogu. Kennedy also revealed that the film will take place "five to six years" after The Rise of Skywalker. In August 2025, it was reported that Matt Smith was cast as the film's villain. Principal photography began in the United Kingdom on August 28, 2025, and Flynn Gray, Aaron Pierre, Simon Bird, Jamael Westman, Daniel Ings, and Amy Adams were announced as cast members.

=== Untitled Sharmeen Obaid-Chinoy film (TBA) ===
In October 2022, The Hollywood Reporter reported that after a two-week writers' room in July (which included Patrick Somerville, Rayna McClendon, Andy Greenwald, and maybe Dave Filoni), Damon Lindelof and Justin Britt-Gibson were co-writing a Star Wars film, with Ms. Marvel director Sharmeen Obaid-Chinoy attached as director. THR reported that according to its sources, "the project is intended as a stand-alone but in success could lead to more movies", taking place after the sequel trilogy and possibly featuring some of its characters. In March 2023, it was reported that Lindelof and Britt-Gibson had left the project in mid-February and that Steven Knight was hired to replace them as screenwriter. Filming was reportedly set to begin in February 2024. At April 2023's Star Wars Celebration, Kennedy announced a Sharmeen Obaid-Chinoy-directed movie, with Daisy Ridley returning as Rey as she constructs a new Jedi Order 15 years after the events of The Rise of Skywalker. She reportedly may be a supporting character in the vein of Jedi Masters Obi-Wan Kenobi and Luke Skywalker in the original and sequel trilogies, respectively. Steven Knight departed the project by October 2024 with filming not expected to start until late 2025. In January 2025, George Nolfi had been hired to write the screenplay.

=== Untitled Dave Filoni film (TBA) ===
In December 2020, it was revealed that The Mandalorian and its related series were planned to culminate in a "climactic story event". At Star Wars Celebration in 2023, it was announced that Dave Filoni would make his live-action feature directorial debut with a film set in the New Republic era, connecting storylines that began with The Mandalorian, The Book of Boba Fett, Ahsoka, and Skeleton Crew. In January 2026, after Filoni was named president and chief creative officer of Lucasfilm, The Hollywood Reporter reported that the film had been "put on the back burner".

=== Untitled James Mangold film (TBA) ===
In April 2023, during Star Wars Celebration Europe IV, Lucasfilm announced that James Mangold would write and direct a Star Wars film whose story "will go back to the dawn of the Jedi" and explore the origins of The Force, set around 25,000 years before the events of A New Hope. It is set to be the start of a new era set within Star Wars timeline, dubbed Dawn of the Jedi. The film has been described as a "Cecil B. DeMille-style biblical epic.", with Mangold citing The Ten Commandments as a major inspiration for the film. Mangold was offered the project during production of Indiana Jones and the Dial of Destiny. Mangold confirmed shortly afterwards that he had begun developing the film alongside his screenplay for the DC Universe Swamp Thing film, and was uncertain which project would move forward first following his Bob Dylan biopic A Complete Unknown. In April 2024, it was reported that Beau Willimon (who had written episodes of Andor) would co-write the film alongside Mangold. During an interview in May 2024, producer Simon Emanuel seemingly revealed the film's title, Jedi Prime. During an interview in 2026, Kathleen Kennedy revealed that Mangold and Willimon had written the script but the film was on hold.

In September 2023, David S. Goyer revealed that he had written a treatment for an unproduced Star Wars film about the origins of the Jedi Order.

=== Untitled Taika Waititi film (TBA) ===
On May 4, 2020, Taika Waititi (who directed the first-season finale of The Mandalorian and voiced IG-11) was announced to direct a Star Wars film from a screenplay he was co-writing with Krysty Wilson-Cairns. As of May 2022, his film was expected to be released before Rogue Squadron (originally scheduled for December 2023 prior to its delay), with Kennedy asserting that Waititi's film may be released in late 2023. In June 2022, Waititi agreed with Kennedy's view that the films should move into new territory instead of origin stories, and stated he would continue writing the project while filming other projects. The movie was reportedly expected to be shot in Los Angeles. By March 2023, Waititi was also likely to appear in the film. The next month, Kennedy stated that Waititi was now writing the film alone. In early May, Deadline Hollywood reported that Waititi may begin filming the project in 2024. In September 2023, amidst rumors of the film's cancellation, it was revealed that it was still in development and that Waititi would resume writing the script after the conclusion of the 2023 Writers Guild of America strike. In February 2025, Kathleen Kennedy revealed that Waititi was still working on the script with a new co-writer. In April 2025, Kennedy revealed that Tony McNamara was Waititi's new co-writer. In January 2026, Kennedy stated that Waititi had submitted another draft that she described as "hilarious and great." In October 2026, while promoting Klara and the Sun, Waititi revealed the film was on hold and that he and McNamara had moved on to a different project not related to Star Wars.

=== Lando (TBA) ===
In 2018, while promoting Solo, Kathleen Kennedy expressed interest in making a spin-off film focusing on Lando Calrissian. Though it was specified that a project of that sort was not a priority at Lucasfilm. Around the same time, Donald Glover expressed similar interest in a Lando-centric film, suggesting it could take inspiration from the Steven Spielberg film Catch Me If You Can. At Disney Investor Day 2020, a Lando series was announced to be in development for Disney+, with Justin Simien acting as showrunner. In 2023, it was revealed that Simien would be replaced as showrunner by Donald Glover and his brother Stephen. Nearly two months later, Stephen Glover stated in an interview that the project was being redeveloped as a feature film. Donald Glover confirmed his involvement as a writer on the film in September 2024. In early 2026, Kathleen Kennedy revealed that Donald Glover had submitted a draft of the screenplay, confirming Lando was being developed as a feature film.

=== Rogue Squadron (TBA) ===
On December 10, 2020, during Disney Investor Day, Wonder Woman (2017) director Patty Jenkins was announced as the director of a film titled Rogue Squadron, initially set to be released on December 22, 2023. (Note: The film would be the first in the franchise to be directed by a woman.) According to the official Star Wars website, the film would "introduce a new generation of starfighter pilots as they earn their wings and risk their lives in a boundary-pushing, high-speed thrill-ride, and move the saga into the future era of the galaxy." According to Jenkins, the film would be an original story "with great influence from the games and the books". A script was being worked on as of December 2020, at which time, Wonder Woman 3's story was still being worked on. Matthew Robinson was hired to write Rogue Squadron in May 2021; late the next month, Jenkins revealed that the script was almost finished. On November 8, the film's production was delayed from 2022 due to Jenkins' busy schedule. A month later, Jenkins had left her planned Cleopatra film as director in order to focus on Rogue Squadron and Wonder Woman 3. Disney announced in April 2022 that the film was still set to be released in December 2023. Kathleen Kennedy stated in May that the film has been "pushed off to the side for the moment", with the script still being worked on and Waititi's film expected to be released first. On September 15, 2022, the film was confirmed to be taken off from Disney's release schedule, although in December Jenkins said she was actively working on it amid the apparent cancellation of Wonder Woman 3. In April 2023, Kennedy said the project could still happen either as a film or a television series. On March 13, 2024, Jenkins stated that she had signed a new contract with Lucasfilm to write and direct Rogue Squadron.

=== Untitled Simon Kinberg trilogy (TBA) ===
In November 2024, Simon Kinberg was reported to be writing and producing a new Star Wars trilogy with Kathleen Kennedy also to help produce the films. In March 2025, Kathleen Kennedy confirmed the trilogy was in development and revealed Lucasfilm was expecting completed drafts by June 2025. Kennedy also referred to Kinberg's trilogy as "the next saga". In September 2026, it was reported that Jon Watts (who previously co-created, wrote, and directed Skeleton Crew) would helm the first installment.

== Produced for television ==
A holiday TV special, often described as a film, aired in 1978. Two live-action TV films created in the mid-1980s feature the Ewoks.

=== Star Wars Holiday Special (1978) ===
Star Wars Holiday Special film
Film	U.S. release date	Directed by	Screenplay by	Produced by	Network
Star Wars Holiday Special	November 17, 1978	Steve Binder	Pat Proft, Leonard Ripps, Bruce Vilanch, Rod Warren & Mitzie Welch	Joe Layton, Jeff Starsh, Ken Welch, Mitzie Welch	CBS

Produced for CBS in 1978, the Star Wars Holiday Special was a two-hour television special, in the format of a variety show. Stars of the original film and archive footage from the original Star Wars film appeared alongside celebrity guest stars in plot-related skits, musical numbers, and an animated segment, all loosely tied together by the premise of Chewbacca's family waiting for his arrival for the "Life Day" celebration on his home planet, Kashyyyk. The special is notorious for its extremely negative reception and was aired only once. Only the 11-minute animated sequence, which features the debut of bounty hunter Boba Fett, was positively received.

=== Ewok films ===
The Ewoks from Return of the Jedi were featured in two spin-off television films, The Ewok Adventure and Ewoks: The Battle for Endor. Both aired on ABC on the Thanksgiving weekends of 1984 and 1985, respectively, with at least the first also being given a limited international theatrical release. Warwick Davis reprised his debut role as the main Ewok, Wicket, in both. They are set between the events of The Empire Strikes Back and Return of the Jedi. Both films were released on VHS, LaserDisc, and on a double-feature DVD. Although based on stories written by George Lucas, they do not bear Star Wars in their titles, and were considered to exist in a lower level of canon than the episodic films. Following Disney's acquisition of the franchise, they were excluded from the canon. The Battle for Endor would be the last live-action Star Wars television project produced by Lucasfilm until 2019's The Mandalorian.

Star Wars Ewok films
Film	U.S. release date	Directed by	Screenplay by	Story by	Produced by	Network
The Ewok Adventure (Note: Retitled Caravan of Courage: An Ewok Adventure for its theatrical and later releases)	November 25, 1984	John Korty	Bob Carrau	George Lucas	Thomas G. Smith, Patricia Rose Duignan	ABC
Ewoks: The Battle for Endor	November 24, 1985	Jim Wheat & Ken Wheat	Jim Wheat & Ken Wheat	George Lucas	Thomas G. Smith	ABC

==== The Ewok Adventure (1984) ====
In a story by Lucas and a screenplay by Bob Carrau, the Towani family spaceship shipwrecks on the forest moon of Endor. While trying to repair their ship, the castaway family is split, when a giant creature known as the Gorax kidnaps the parents. Taking pity on the kids, a group of native Ewoks led by Wicket decides to help little Cindel Towani and her older brother Mace, rescue their parents. Among other stylistic choices making the film unique from the Star Wars episodes is the inclusion of a narrator.

==== Ewoks: The Battle for Endor (1985) ====
The sequel focuses on the Ewoks protecting their village from marauders led by the evil Lord Terak, who killed all the members of the Towani family except for Cindel, in search of a power battery. It was followed by the TV series Ewoks (1985–1986).

== Produced for Disney+ ==
=== Star Wars Funday Football (2027) ===
Star Wars Funday Football is the first animated alternate presentation of a Super Bowl matchup and the fourth NFL animated alternate game day telecast from ESPN, Disney and the NFL. This special is to be released on February 14, 2027.

=== A Droid Story (TBA) ===
In December 2020, A Droid Story, an animated adventure film for Disney+ was announced. According to the official Star Wars Twitter, the "epic journey will introduce us to a new hero guided by R2-D2 and C-3PO." As of 2026, this project has not yet been released.

== Reception ==
=== Box office performance ===
The Star Wars films are the third-highest-grossing film franchise of all time worldwide, behind the Marvel Cinematic Universe and Spider-Man, having grossed over $10 billion at the global box office.

Film	US release date	Box office gross			All-time ranking		Budget	Ref.
Film	US release date	US and Canada	Other territories	Worldwide	US and Canada	Worldwide	Budget	Ref.
Skywalker Saga
A New Hope	May 25, 1977	$460,998,507	$314,399,500	$775,398,007	24	112	$11 million	
The Empire Strikes Back	May 21, 1980	$292,753,960	$257,262,126	$550,016,086	109	218	$18 million	
Return of the Jedi	May 25, 1983	$316,566,101	$165,900,281	$482,466,382	92	262	$32.5 million	
The Phantom Menace	May 19, 1999	$487,576,624	$558,938,030	$1,046,515,409	21	43	$115 million	
Attack of the Clones	May 16, 2002	$310,676,740	$343,103,230	$653,779,970	96	163	$115 million	
Revenge of the Sith	May 19, 2005	$414,378,291	$491,217,656	$905,595,947	52	83	$113 million	
The Force Awakens	December 18, 2015	$936,662,225	$1,134,647,993	$2,071,310,218	1	5	$535.5 million	
The Last Jedi	December 15, 2017	$620,181,382	$714,226,324	$1,334,407,706	13	20	$343.2 million	
The Rise of Skywalker	December 20, 2019	$515,202,542	$561,819,830	$1,077,022,372	19	38	$490.2 million	
Spin-off films
The Clone Wars	August 15, 2008	$35,161,554	$33,121,290	$68,282,844	2,558	2,440	$8.5 million	
Rogue One: A Star Wars Story	December 16, 2016	$533,539,991	$525,142,151	$1,058,682,142	18	42	$271 million	
Solo: A Star Wars Story	May 25, 2018	$213,767,512	$179,157,295	$392,924,807	206	356	$299.8 million	
The Mandalorian and Grogu	May 23, 2026	$177,728,617	$167,438,000	$345,166,617	TBD	TBD	$165 million	
Total		$5,314,653,418	$5,446,373,706	$10,761,027,124	2	3	$2.5177 billion	

=== Critical response ===
Film	Rotten Tomatoes	Metacritic	CinemaScore
Skywalker Saga
A New Hope	93% (208 reviews)	90 (24 reviews)	—N/a
The Empire Strikes Back	93% (174 reviews)	82 (25 reviews)	A+
Return of the Jedi	83% (169 reviews)	58 (24 reviews)	A+
The Phantom Menace	54% (290 reviews)	51 (36 reviews)	A−
Attack of the Clones	62% (323 reviews)	54 (39 reviews)	A−
Revenge of the Sith	79% (335 reviews)	68 (40 reviews)	A−
The Force Awakens	93% (447 reviews)	80 (55 reviews)	A
The Last Jedi	91% (483 reviews)	84 (56 reviews)	A
The Rise of Skywalker	51% (522 reviews)	53 (61 reviews)	B+
Spin-off films
The Clone Wars	18% (170 reviews)	35 (30 reviews)	B−
Rogue One	84% (459 reviews)	65 (51 reviews)	A
Solo	69% (490 reviews)	62 (54 reviews)	A−
The Mandalorian and Grogu	61% (332 reviews)	53 (53 reviews)	A–
Television films
Holiday Special	25% (16 reviews)	—N/a	—N/a
The Ewok Adventure	39% (66 reviews)	—N/a	—N/a
Ewoks: The Battle for Endor	61% (31 reviews)	—N/a	—N/a

=== Accolades ===
==== Academy Awards ====
The eleven live-action films together have been nominated for 37 Academy Awards, of which they have won seven. The films were also awarded a total of three Special Achievement Awards. The Empire Strikes Back and Return of the Jedi received Special Achievement Awards for their visual effects, and Star Wars received a Special Achievement Award for its alien, creature and robot voices.

Film	Best Picture	Best Director	Best Supporting Actor	Best Original Screenplay	Best Costume Design	Best Film Editing	Best Makeup	Best Original Score	Best Production Design	Best Sound Editing	Best Sound Mixing	Best Visual Effects	Ref.
Star Wars (Note: Later titled Star Wars: Episode IV – A New Hope)	Nom	Nom	Nom (Note: Alec Guinness for his performance as Obi-Wan Kenobi.)	Nom	Won	Won	—	Won	Won		Won	Won	
The Empire Strikes Back				—			—	Nom	Nom		Won	(Note: Special Achievement)	
Return of the Jedi				—				Nom	Nom	Nom	Nom		
The Phantom Menace				—						Nom	Nom	Nom	
Attack of the Clones				—								Nom	
Revenge of the Sith				—			Nom						
The Force Awakens				—		Nom		Nom		Nom	Nom	Nom	
Rogue One				—							Nom	Nom	
The Last Jedi				—				Nom		Nom	Nom	Nom	
Solo				—								Nom	
The Rise of Skywalker				—				Nom		Nom		Nom	

==== Grammy Awards ====
The franchise has received a total of fifteen Grammy Award nominations, winning six.

Film	Album of the Year	Best Pop Instrumental Performance	Best Score Soundtrack for Visual Media	Best Instrumental Composition	Ref.
Star Wars	Nominated	Won	Won	Won (Note: For "Star Wars – Main Title")	
The Empire Strikes Back		Nominated (Note: For "Yoda's Theme")	Won	Won (Note: For The Empire Strikes Back. Also nominated for "The Imperial March (Darth Vader's Theme) and "Yoda's Theme".)	
Return of the Jedi			Nominated		
The Phantom Menace			Nominated		
Revenge of the Sith			Nominated	Nominated (Note: For "Anakin's Betrayal")	
The Force Awakens			Won		
Solo				Nominated	
The Last Jedi			Nominated		
The Rise of Skywalker			Nominated		

==== Library of Congress ====
In 1989, the Library of Congress selected the original Star Wars film for preservation in the U.S. National Film Registry, as being "culturally, historically, or aesthetically significant." The Empire Strikes Back was selected in 2010, while Return of the Jedi was selected in 2021. 35 mm reels of the 1997 Special Editions were the versions initially presented for preservation because of the difficulty of transferring from the original prints, but it was later revealed that the Library possessed a copyright deposit print of the original theatrical releases. By 2015, Star Wars had been transferred to a 2K scan which can be viewed by appointment.

==== Emmy Awards ====
Caravan of Courage: An Ewok Adventure was one of four films to be juried-awarded Emmys for Outstanding Special Visual Effects at the 37th Primetime Emmy Awards. The film was additionally nominated for Outstanding Children's Program but lost in this category to an episode of American Playhouse.

At the 38th Primetime Emmy Awards, Ewoks: The Battle for Endor and the CBS documentary Dinosaur! were both juried-awarded Emmys for Outstanding Special Visual Effects. The film additionally received two nominations for Outstanding Children's Program and Outstanding Sound Mixing for a Miniseries or a Special.

== Unproduced and abandoned projects ==
=== Untitled Zack Snyder film ===
In the 2000s Zack Snyder had pitched an adult-oriented film to Lucasfilm, but conversations ceased by the time Disney acquired the company in 2012. The project was redeveloped as Rebel Moon (2023).

=== Spin-off films centered on Boba Fett and Yoda ===
In early 2013, Bob Iger announced the development of spin-off films focusing on Han Solo, Boba Fett, and Yoda. Simon Kinberg was announced to be the screenwriter of the Boba Fett film shortly afterward. In mid-2014, Josh Trank was officially announced as the director of an undisclosed spin-off film, but had left the project a year later due to creative differences, causing a teaser for the film to be scrapped from Star Wars Celebration. Though it was later revealed that Trank was removed from the project following behind the scenes issues on Fantastic Four. In May 2020, Trank confirmed that his planned Star Wars film was the Boba Fett film. In May 2018, it was reported that James Mangold would direct the Boba Fett movie, with Kinberg still attached as screenwriter. Five months later, the film was announced to be cancelled, with Lucasfilm instead focusing their attention on The Mandalorian, which utilized a similar character to Fett. Mangold confirmed his brief involvement in 2023, revealing he wrote a "borderline R-rated" script. He cited the poor commercial performance of Solo as the main reason for the film's cancellation.

=== Obi-Wan: A Star Wars Story ===
In 2017, it was announced that an anthology film focused on Obi-Wan Kenobi was in development with Stephen Daldry set as director and writer. In May 2018, the film was reportedly titled Obi-Wan: A Star Wars Story, with a plot involving Kenobi protecting a young Luke Skywalker on the planet Tatooine during tensions between local farmers and Tusken Raiders. Production on the film was expected to take place in Northern Ireland under the working title Joshua Tree in 2019. The film was cancelled in 2018, later being redeveloped as a TV series for Disney+, which aired in 2022. In 2022, writer Stuart Beattie revealed in an interview that he pitched an Obi-Wan Kenobi trilogy and wrote a draft for the first installment.

=== Potential sequels to Rogue One and Solo ===
Rogue One and Solo actors Felicity Jones, Alden Ehrenreich and Emilia Clarke all stated that their contracts also included future installments. Solo director Ron Howard said that while no sequel was in development, it was up to the fans to decide. Although critics noted that Solo left room open for sequels, in 2022, Howard confirmed that the studio had no plans to make one.

=== Untitled Jabba the Hutt film ===
In August 2017, it was rumored that a film focused on Jabba the Hutt was in the works. In June 2018, a rumor circulated that a movie taking place in Mos Eisley was in the works as well. In September 2023, David S. Goyer confirmed that he had written a script treatment for an unproduced Jabba-centric film that was intended to be directed by Guillermo del Toro. It was also revealed that this was the same project as the rumored Mos Eisley film, with Alden Ehrenreich expected to reprise his role as Han Solo. The film was cancelled due to Solo's poor commercial performance.

=== Untitled D. B. Weiss and David Benioff series ===
In 2018, Lucasfilm announced that Game of Thrones showrunners D. B. Weiss and David Benioff would develop a series of Star Wars films, often believed to be a trilogy. In 2019, Kathleen Kennedy revealed the studio's intention of planning the next decade of films, with Weiss, Benioff, and Rian Johnson working together to map out the franchise's future. A month later, Bob Iger announced that the first Star Wars film released after a brief hiatus following the release of The Rise of Skywalker would be directed by Weiss and Benioff, set to be released in 2022. In October 2019, it was revealed that Weiss and Benioff had departed their trilogy after making an overall deal with Netflix, though Kathleen Kennedy expressed interest in working with the duo in the future. Weiss and Benioff's films would have focused on the origins of the Jedi.

=== Untitled Knights of the Old Republic film ===
In April 2019, Kathleen Kennedy was asked by MTV News about a potential Knights of the Old Republic adaption and stated, "Yes, we are developing something to look at. Right now, I have no idea where things might fall." The following month, BuzzFeed News reported that Laeta Kalogridis had been hired in the spring of 2018 to write a film based on the 2003 video game, and that she was close to completing the first script of a potential trilogy.

=== Untitled Kevin Feige film ===
In September 2019, Marvel Cinematic Universe producer Kevin Feige reportedly began developing a Star Wars film with Kennedy; Michael Waldron was later announced to write the screenplay. (Note: When asked if his film would be a "solo" outing, Feige specified that his film would neither be about nor include the character Han Solo.) (Note: Rumors of Eternals director Chloé Zhao signing on to direct circulated, but were quickly debunked.) In May 2022, Waldron confirmed the project was moving forward and that it would more or less stand alone, however in a separate interview the same month Kennedy denied that the film was in active development. By March 2023, the film was confirmed to no longer be in development. Contrary to earlier comments, Kennedy clarified the following month that the project was more something conflated through the media, that "nothing ever got developed. We never discussed an idea... If [Feige] did come up with something, I would be all ears. But, that's never really happened, so it's not an abandoned project. It just never really happened." In May 2023, Anthony and Joe Russo (who collaborated with Feige on multiple films set in the Marvel Cinematic Universe) revealed that they had conversations with Feige about potentially directing the film.

=== Untitled J. D. Dillard and Matt Owens film ===
J. D. Dillard and Luke Cage writer Matt Owens were reportedly involved in the early stages of developing a Star Wars film in February 2020, which may have taken place on the Sith planet Exegol. In November 2022, Dillard announced that he was no longer involved in the project, which was purportedly to take inspiration from the Star Wars: TIE Fighter video game.

=== Untitled Rian Johnson trilogy ===
Rian Johnson, the writer/director of The Last Jedi (2017), was confirmed to write and direct the first film of a new trilogy he was outlining as of early 2019 with Ram Bergman producing alongside Kennedy. It was said to differ from the Skywalker-focused films in favor of focusing on new characters and possibly a different era than the main film franchise. The project was considered to have been "back-burnered" by May 2022 due to Johnson's involvement with other projects, including the Knives Out franchise. Johnson indicated that he would make at least one more film in that series following Glass Onion before returning to Star Wars. In May 2025, Johnson stated that if he makes "another Star Wars, [he will] be the happiest person. In July 2025, Johnson admitted that his Star Wars trilogy never got off the ground.

=== The Hunt for Ben Solo ===
In October 2025, Adam Driver revealed that he had been developing a film set after the events of The Rise of Skywalker entitled The Hunt for Ben Solo (operating under the code name Quiet Leaves). The film would have been directed by Steven Soderbergh, with Scott Z. Burns writing the script (based on a story outline by Soderbergh and Rebecca Blunt). While Lucasfilm loved the idea, when they presented the screenplay to Disney, Bob Iger and Alan Bergman said no because, according to Driver, "They didn't see how Ben Solo was alive. And that was that." The Hunt for Ben Solo marked the first time that a project that was fully written out and approved by Lucasfilm was cancelled by Disney. In January 2026, Kathleen Kennedy stated the script for the film was still on the back-burner.

=== Untitled David Fincher film ===
On October 23, 2025, it was reported by Jeff Sneider that David Fincher had pitched a Star Wars film set after the events of The Rise of Skywalker and centered on a pre-existing character, but that the film did not enter production due to Lucasfilm not granting Fincher final cut privilege. Two days later The Playlist website said that the report was inaccurate and that the film would have been set instead between The Last Jedi and The Rise of Skywalker and that the pitch didn't progress past "a few phone calls". Fincher had previously been considered to direct The Force Awakens.

=== Untitled Paul King film ===
On August 8, 2026, screenwriter Simon Farnaby revealed that he and frequent collaborator Paul King were asked by Lucasfilm to develop a new Star Wars film. Farnaby was slated to co-write the script alongside King, who was intended to direct. The film's story was to center on a droid and did not feature any preexisting Star Wars characters. Despite being rejected by Disney, the studio encouraged Farnaby and King to redevelop the project as an original film.

== Documentaries ==
Documentary films about Star Wars released by Lucasfilm include:

- The Making of Star Wars (1977)
- SP FX: The Empire Strikes Back (1980)
- Classic Creatures: Return of the Jedi (1983)
- From Star Wars to Jedi: The Making of a Saga (1983)
- The Beginning: Making 'Episode I' (2001)
- From Puppets to Pixels: Digital Characters in 'Episode II' (2002)
- The Story of Star Wars (2004)
- Empire of Dreams: The Story of the Star Wars Trilogy (2004)
- Star Wars: Heroes & Villains (2005)
- Within a Minute: The Making of Episode III (2005)
- Star Wars: The Legacy Revealed (2007)
- Secrets of the Force Awakens: A Cinematic Journey (2016)
- The Force of Sound (2018)
- The Director and the Jedi (2018)
- The Skywalker Legacy (2020)
- Under the Helmet: The Legacy of Boba Fett (2021)
- Obi-Wan Kenobi: A Jedi's Return (2022)
- The Hero Awakens (2027)

== See also ==
- List of Star Wars television series
- List of Star Wars cast members
- List of Star Wars characters

=== Parodies ===
- Hardware Wars (1978)
- Return of the Ewok (1982)
- Spaceballs (1987)
- Thumb Wars (1999)
- R2-D2: Beneath the Dome (2001)
- Robot Chicken: Star Wars (2007)
- Robot Chicken: Star Wars Episode II (2008)
- Laugh It Up, Fuzzball: The Family Guy Trilogy (2010)
- Robot Chicken: Star Wars Episode III (2010)
- Phineas and Ferb: Star Wars (2014)
