= Robert Beecham =

British businessman (born 1951)

Robert Simon Beecham
- Occupations: Businessman, property developer
- Known for: Securing first Star Wars merchandise license in Europe
- Spouse: Claire Beecham
- Website: ]

Robert Simon Beecham (born February 1951) is a British businessman who secured the first Star Wars product license in Europe in 1977. He sold out to Hasbro in 2002 to become a property developer.

== Early life ==
Robert Simon Beecham was born in February 1951.

== Career ==
Beecham secured the first Star Wars product license in Europe in 1977. He sold out to U.S. toy company Hasbro in 2002 to become a property developer and in that capacity is a director of Latitude Investments Limited and associated companies. He also started a designer toy company known as Dudebox.

== Personal life ==
Robert Beecham is married to Claire Beecham. They are trustees of the Claire and Robert Beecham Charitable Trust. The couple live in Primrose Hill, London. In November 2015, Beecham's plan to rebuild his current home and extend it underground with what was described as "London's biggest basement", was subject to criticism by some of his neighbours.
