= The Complete Saga =

The Complete Saga or Complete Saga may refer to:

== Literature ==
- Coronation Street: The Complete Saga, a 2004 novel by Katherine Hardy about Coronation Street

=== Comics ===
- Bender: The Complete Saga, a 2018 graphic novel by David Frizell and Michael Frizell based on the Bloody Benders serial killers
- Concrete Revolutio: The Complete Saga, a 2017 compendium graphic novel tankoban manga for Concrete Revolutio
- Death Hawk: The Complete Saga a 2019 anthology volume graphic novel by Mark Ellis (American author)
- The Eternals: The Complete Saga, a 2020 anthology volume comic book from "Marvel Omnibus"

== Video releases ==
- Star Wars: The Complete Saga, a 2011 blu-ray boxset from LucasFilm; see List of Lucasfilm productions
- Mighty Morphin Power Rangers: The Complete Saga, a 2013 DVD boxset; see List of Mighty Morphin Power Rangers home video releases

== Other uses ==
- Lego Star Wars: The Complete Saga, a 2007 videogame
