= Richard Marquand =

Welsh film director (1937–1987)

- Born: Richard Alfred Marquand; 22 September 1937; Cardiff, Wales
- Died: 4 September 1987 (aged 49); Royal Tunbridge Wells, England
- Resting place: Forest Lawn Memorial Park, Los Angeles, California, U.S
- Occupations: Film and television director
- Spouses: Josephine Elwyn-Jones (m. 1960; div. 1970) Carol Bell (m. 1981)
- Children: 4, including James
- Parent: Hilary Marquand (father)
- Relatives: David Marquand (brother)

Richard Alfred Marquand (22 September 1937 – 4 September 1987) was a Welsh film and television director active in both American and British film productions, best known for directing the 1983 space opera Return of the Jedi, the final film in the original Star Wars trilogy. He also directed the 1981 drama film Eye of the Needle, the critically panned romance film Until September, and the 1985 thriller Jagged Edge.

== Early life ==
Marquand was born in Llanishen, Cardiff, Wales. He was the son of Rachel E. (née Rees) and Hilary Marquand, an economist and Labour MP who served as Minister of Pensions and later Minister of Health under Prime Minister Clement Attlee. He is the younger brother of David Marquand, who also served as a Labour MP.

Marquand was educated at Emanuel School, London, the University of Aix-Marseille in France and King's College, Cambridge, where he studied modern languages, and where one of his tutors was E. M. Forster. During National Service he studied Mandarin and was posted to Hong Kong where he also read the news on the English language Hong Kong Television.

== Career ==
By late 1966, Marquand had begun a career directing television documentaries for the BBC, where he worked on projects such as the 1972 series Search for the Nile and an edition of One Pair of Eyes (1968), about the novelist Margaret Drabble who had been a friend of his at Cambridge. He collaborated with the celebrated foreign correspondent James Cameron on a long-running series called Cameron Country for BBC television and also with John Pilger on a series of films for ITV. In 1979, Marquand incorporated many of his documentary techniques in his biographical television movie Birth of the Beatles. He directed several films specifically for children including the 1977 Emmy winning Big Henry and the Polka Dot Kid.

On the strength of his direction of the 1981 feature, Eye of the Needle, Marquand was hired by writer-producer George Lucas to direct Return of the Jedi. In his commentary track on the DVD, Lucas explains that Marquand "had done some great suspense films and was really good with actors. Eye of the Needle was the film I'd seen that he had done that impressed me the most, it was really nicely done and had a lot of energy and suspense." For his work on the film, Marquand won a Hugo Award for Best Dramatic Presentation in 1984.

Marquand subsequently directed the 1985 courtroom thriller Jagged Edge, starring Jeff Bridges and Glenn Close.

== Personal life and death ==
In 1960, Marquand married screenwriter Josephine Elwyn-Jones, the daughter of Labour MP Elwyn Jones and author and illustrator Pearl Binder. They had two children, Hannah Rachel and James Elwyn, before they divorced in 1970. James Marquand is a film editor who has also worked as a director. In 1981, Marquand married fellow film director Carol Bell, with whom he had another two children, Sam Adair and Molly Joyce. Marquand was a fan of Liverpool Football Club.

According to a 2014 Wales Online interview with his son James, Marquand wrote a screenplay for "a Welsh western" in the late 1970s at the South Wales branch of Pinewood Studios. The screenplay told the story of a young orphan girl in Victorian Mid Wales who enlists two local men to help her wreak revenge on those who killed her father; Marquand used to tell the story to his children when they were on holiday at the family's cottage near Tregaron. Marquand reportedly pitched it to Hollywood producers who expressed interest in making it into a film; however, Marquand declined the offer because the producers insisted the story be relocated to the Rocky Mountains in the United States. In the interview, James Marquand expressed interest in adapting his father's screenplay into a film.

On 30 August 1987, Marquand had a stroke at his home in Penshurst. He was taken to Kent and Sussex Hospital in Royal Tunbridge Wells, where he died five days later, on 4 September, at the age of 49. His last film, Hearts of Fire, starring Bob Dylan, was released posthumously.

== Filmography ==
Short film

Year	Title	Director	Producer	Writer
1975	The Puritan Experience: Making of a New World	Yes	Yes	Yes
1975	The Puritan Experience: Forsaking England	Yes	Yes	No

=== Feature film ===
Director

Year	Title	Notes
1978	The Legacy	
1979	Birth of the Beatles	
1981	Eye of the Needle	
1983	Return of the Jedi	Cameo as "Maj. Marquand" and voice cameo as "EV-9D9"
1984	Until September	
1985	Jagged Edge	
1987	Hearts of Fire	Also producer

Story writer

- Nowhere to Run (1993) (Posthumous release)

=== Television ===
Miniseries

Year	Title	Notes
1963	This Nation Tomorrow	3 episodes
1965	Inside America	4 episodes
1966	Inside Ireland	2 episodes
1966	Women, Women, Women	2 episodes
1967	Inside Australia	Director (4 episodes) / Narrator (12 episodes)
1971	The Search for the Nile	2 episodes

TV movies

Year	Title	Director	Producer	Notes
1964	Home for Heroes?	Yes	Yes	
1964	Birmingham '64	No	Yes	
1970	Edward II	Yes	No	Associate director under Toby Robertson

TV series

Year	Title	Director	Producer	Writer	Notes
1968–70	Cameron Country	Yes	Yes	No	Director (8 episodes) / Producer (episode ''Nobody Ever Asks Why'')
1976	NBC Special Treat	Yes	No	Yes	Director (2 episodes) / Writer (episode ''Luke Was There'')

=== Documentary works ===
Short film

- The Iron Village (1973)
- Between the Anvil and the Hammer (1973)
- Do Yourself Some Good (1975)

TV series

Year	Title	Director	Producer	Notes
1963	The Sky at Night	Yes	No	2 episodes
1963–64	Adventure	Yes	Yes	2 episodes
1964–65	Landmarks	Yes	No	2 episodes
1967–70	One Pair of Eyes	Yes	No	4 episodes
1971–73	Omnibus	Yes	Yes	Director (2 episodes) / Producer (episode ''That's My Little Masterpiece'')
1975–76	Pilger	Yes	Yes	Director (4 episodes) / Producer (episode ''Zap!! The Weapon Is Food'')

As himself

- E.M. Forster 1879-1970 (1970)
- Classic Creatures: Return of the Jedi (1983)
- From 'Star Wars' to 'Jedi': The Making of a Saga (1983)
- Omnibus (1987) (Episode ''Getting to Dylan'')

== Theatre ==
- The Revenger’s Tragedy (1958 – 1959, International Festival of University Theatre) (Actor. Role: Unknown)
- The Musicians (1969, Mercury Theatre) (Actor. Role: Stephan)
- Edward II (1969, Mermaid Theatre) (assistant director)
- PS Your Cat is Dead! (1979, Open Space Theatre) (Director)
