= David Myers (cinematographer) =

American photographer and cinematographer (1914-2004)

- Born: May 8, 1914; Auburn, New York, US
- Died: August 26, 2004 (aged 90)
- Education: Antioch College
- Occupations: Photographer and cinematographer

David Myers (May 8, 1914, Auburn, New York–August 26, 2004, Mill Valley, California, USA) was an American photographer and cinematographer known for his documentaries on popular music and musicians.

== Photographer ==
David Myers was born on May 8, 1914, in Auburn, New York. When he was 15, 'The New York Times paid him $15 for a shot of a fire in Greenwich Village. After being inspired by photographer Walker Evans's work at the New York Museum of Modern Art in 1938, Myers also worked for the Farm Security Administration, while studying at Antioch College. His FSA pictures were included in Just Before the War, an exhibition in the Prints and Photographs Division of the Library of Congress shown on the Gallery of the Main Library February 14–March 30, 1969.

During World War II, a conscientious objector, Myers was conscripted to the U.S. Forest Service and photographed patients of a mental hospital in Spokane, Washington. After the war, he attended the California School of Fine Arts which was then staffed by Ansel Adams, Minor White, Imogen Cunningham, Dorothea Lange, Lisette Model, and Edward Weston. His gritty portrait of a heavily laden and exhausted farm boy was featured in Edward Steichen’s 1955 exhibition The Family of Man for the Museum of Modern Art and was graced by 9 million visitors worldwide.

== Cinematographer and director ==
In 1957, he directed a documentary film Ansel Adams, Photographer, written by Nancy Newhall and narrated by Beaumont Newhall. He then directed the documentary short Ask Me, Don't Tell Me (1961), with the support of photographer Imogen Cunningham, and continued his career shooting documentaries for both National Geographic and the United Nations through the 1960s, requiring much international travel. His first major credit was co-photography with Didier Tarot on Agnes Varda's short Oncle Yanco ( "Uncle Yanco", 1967), made in San Francisco about one of her relatives who was a painter leading a hippie life on a barge.

At fifty-six, his contribution as one of five camera operators on the landmark rock concert documentary Woodstock (1970) brought an Oscar and established his reputation as a filmmaker in the rock music industry. That achievement was followed by his cinematography on Johnny Cash in San Quentin (1969), Elvis on Tour (1972), Joe Cocker: Mad Dogs & Englishmen (1971), Soul to Soul (1971), Wattstax (1973), Let the Good Times Roll (1973), Save the Children (1973), The Grateful Dead (1977), Martin Scorsese's The Last Waltz (1978), Neil Young's Journey Through The Past (1974) and Human Highway (1982) and Joni Mitchell's Shadows and Light (1980).

Myers also shot the Oscar-winning documentary Marjoe (1972) and The Mysterious Monsters (1975) on paranormal phenomena. in addition to documentary work, Myers was the cinematographer on feature films including George Lucas' early THX 1138 (1971), Welcome to L.A. (1976), Bob Dylan's Renaldo and Clara (1978), FM (1978), Roadie (1980), Zoot Suit (1981) and UFOria (1985).

== Legacy and death ==
Myers was made an honorary member of the Society of Operating Cameramen before he died at the age of 90, following a stroke on August 26, 2004.
