= Yabba Dabba Doo! The Happy World of Hanna-Barbera =

1977 American live-action/animated television special

- 1977 TV Guide promotional advertisement
- Written by: Marshall Flaum
- Directed by: Marshall Flaum
- Presented by: Gene Kelly
- Starring: Cloris Leachman; Jonathan Winters; Lorne Greene
- Country of origin: United States
- Original language: English

Production
- Executive producer: Louis M. Heyward
- Producers: William Hanna; Joseph Barbera; Marshall Flaum
- Cinematography: Dennis Dalzell
- Editor: Bert Lovitt
- Running time: 120 minutes
- Production company: Hanna-Barbera Productions

Original release
- Network: CBS
- Release: November 24, 1977

Related
- The Hanna-Barbera Hall of Fame: Yabba Dabba Doo II

Yabba Dabba Doo! The Happy World of Hanna-Barbera is a 1977 American live-action/animated television special produced by Hanna-Barbera Productions, which premiered on CBS on Thanksgiving Day, November 24, 1977.

== Summary ==
The special is hosted by Gene Kelly with special guests Jonathan Winters, Cloris Leachman and Lorne Greene celebrating the 20th anniversary of the award-winning partnership of animators William Hanna and Joseph Barbera. It covers Hanna-Barbera creations from their first collaboration effort in 1938 working at Metro-Goldwyn-Mayer cartoon studio, to their formed partnership of Hanna-Barbera Productions in 1957, and all the way through to Heidi's Song, an animated theatrical feature that was currently in production at the time, which would see release five years later in 1982.

The special spotlights several animated characters as The Flintstones, Ruff and Reddy, Yogi Bear, Huckleberry Hound, Quick Draw McGraw, Augie Doggie and Doggie Daddy, The Jetsons, Scooby-Doo, Tom and Jerry and many others, as well as feature-length pieces including Jack and the Beanstalk (1967), Charlotte's Web (1973) and Cyrano (1974). It also includes film clips in which the duo pioneered the technique of mixing animation with live-action such as Gene Kelly dancing with Jerry Mouse in Anchors Aweigh (1945) and Esther Williams teaching Jerry how to swim in Dangerous When Wet (1953).

In addition to the narrative provided by Kelly, Cloris Leachman introduces the various animated families of Hanna-Barbera and has a friendly chat with Pebbles Flintstone; Jonathan Winters introduces the strange, futuristic and fantastic world of Hanna-Barbera creations and Lorne Greene demonstrates how animated films are brought to the screen while in a recording studio.

A sequel special, The Hanna-Barbera Hall of Fame: Yabba Dabba Doo II (hosted by Bill Bixby), was broadcast on CBS in 1979.

== Cast ==
- William Hanna
- Joseph Barbera
- Gene Kelly – Host
- Cloris Leachman – Special guest
- Jonathan Winters – Special guest
- Lorne Greene – Special guest
