= The Mysterious Monsters =

Bigfoot: The Mysterious Monster
- Directed by: Robert Guenette
- Written by: Robert Guenette
- Produced by: Robert Guenette; Charles Sellier
- Starring: Peter Graves; Peter Hurkos; William Stenberg; Sidney Walter; Jerilou Whelchel; Peter C. Byrne
- Cinematography: David Myers
- Production company: Sunn Classic Pictures
- Distributed by: Sunn Classic Pictures
- Release date: March 1976
- Running time: 86 minutes
- Country: United States
- Language: English
- Box office: $10.96 million

The Mysterious Monsters (also known as Bigfoot: The Mysterious Monster) is a 1976 documentary film written and directed by Robert Guenette about the cryptids Bigfoot, the Loch Ness Monster, and the Yeti. It contained content from Guenette’s made-for-TV movie Monsters! Mysteries or Myths? that aired on CBS on November 25, 1974. That version had been produced by David L. Wolper in cooperation with the Smithsonian Institution and was narrated by Rod Serling.

The Mysterious Monsters was one of the first theatrical releases produced by Sunn Classic Pictures. It was narrated by actor Peter Graves. The film investigated not only the possibility of Bigfoot's existence but also of the Loch Ness Monster and the Yeti (the Abominable Snowman). It featured dramatic reenactments of various reported Bigfoot sightings. The film showed one witness being given a lie detector test, another being placed under hypnosis. The Mysterious Monsters was the first movie to feature the home movie taken by Roger Patterson in 1967 reported to show a Bigfoot. Anthropologist Grover Krantz was interviewed and said he believed the film to be authentic. Famed Bigfoot hunter Peter C. Byrne was also featured and gave insights on the hunt. In discussing the Loch Ness Monster, the film showed a 1934 photograph that was said to be of the creature. In 1994, however, this photo was proven to be a hoax.

Robert and Frances Guenette are credited as the authors of a 160-page book adaption of the film.

The film was later featured in an episode of Cinema Insomnia.

== DVD release ==
On September 22, 2009, Cheezy Flicks released the film on DVD. In 2010, Apprehensive Films made the Cinema Insomnia version available also on DVD. The DVD cover is a visual reference to the 1978 Marvel Star Wars comic Star Wars 13: Day of the Dragon Lords.

== See also ==
- Bigfoot in popular culture
- Peter C. Byrne
