= Richard Schickel =

American film scholar (1933–2017)

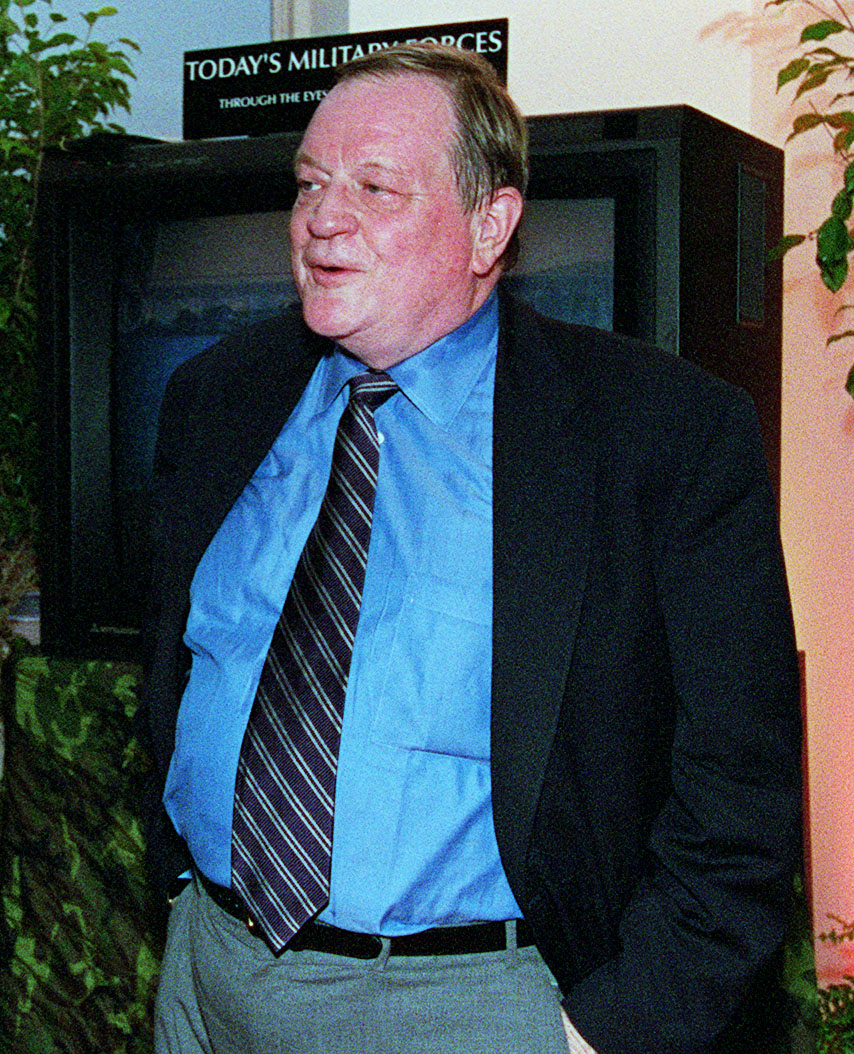
- Schickel in 2000
- Born: Richard Warren Schickel; February 10, 1933; Milwaukee, Wisconsin, U.S.
- Died: February 18, 2017 (aged 84); Los Angeles, California, U.S.
- Education: University of Wisconsin-Madison
- Occupations: Film critic; historian; filmmaker
- Writing career
- Years active: 1960–2015

Richard Warren Schickel (February 10, 1933 – February 18, 2017) was an American film historian, journalist, author, documentarian, and film and literary critic. He was a film critic for Time from 1965–2010, and also wrote for Life and the Los Angeles Times Book Review. His last writings about film were for Truthdig.

He was interviewed in For the Love of Movies: The Story of American Film Criticism (2009). In this documentary, he discusses early film critics Frank E. Woods, Robert E. Sherwood, and Otis Ferguson, and tells of how, in the 1960s, he, Pauline Kael and Andrew Sarris, rejected moralizing opposition of the older Bosley Crowther of The New York Times who had railed against violent movies such as Bonnie and Clyde (1967). In addition to film, Schickel also critiqued and documented cartoons, particularly Peanuts.

== Personal life ==
Schickel was born in Milwaukee, Wisconsin, the son of Helen (née Hendricks) and Edward John Schickel. He received his B.A. in political science from the University of Wisconsin-Madison in 1955.

Schickel had two daughters. Following a series of strokes, he died in Los Angeles on February 18, 2017, eight days after his 84th birthday.

== Honors ==
Schickel received a Guggenheim Fellowship in 1964. He also lectured at Yale University and University of Southern California's School of Film and Television.

== Books ==
- The World of Carnegie Hall (1960)
- The Stars (1962)
- The Gentle Knight (1964)
- Movies: The history of an Art and an Institution (1964)
- The World of Goya, 1746–1828 (1968)
- The Disney Version: The Life, Times, Art and Commerce of Walt Disney (1968); revised editions: 1984, 1997
- The Museum (1970)
- Second Sight: Notes on Some Movies 1965–1970 (1972)
- His Picture in the Papers: A Speculation on Celebrity in America Based on the Life of Douglas Fairbanks, Sr. (1974)
- Harold Lloyd: The Shape of Laughter (1974)
- The World of Tennis (1975)
- The Men Who Made The Movies (1975)
- Douglas Fairbanks: The First Celebrity (1976)
- Another I, Another You: A Novel (1978)
- Singled Out: A Civilized Guide to Sex and Sensibility for the Suddenly Single Man—or Woman (1981)
- Cary Grant: A Celebration (1983)
- D.W. Griffith: An American Life (1984); British Film Institute Book Prize, 1985
- Intimate Strangers: The Culture of Celebrity (1985) (aka Common Fame: The Culture of Celebrity); revised 2000
- Lena by Lena Horne and Richard Schickel
- James Cagney: A Celebration (1986)
- Gary Cooper (1986) ISBN 0-316-77307-7
- Striking Poses: Photographs from the Kobal Collection (1987)
- Carnegie Hall: The First One Hundred Years by Richard Schickel and Michael Walsh (1987)
- Schickel on Film: Encounters—Critical and Personal—With Movie Immortals (1989)
- Brando: A Life in Our Times (1991)
- Double Indemnity (BFI Film Classics) (1992)
- Clint Eastwood: A Biography (1996)
- Hollywood at Home: A Family Album 1950–1965 (1998)
- Matinee Idylls: Reflections on the Movies (1999)
- Good Morning, Mr. Zip Zip Zip: Movies, Memory and World War II (2003)
- Woody Allen: A Life in Film (2004)
- Elia Kazan: A Biography (2005)
- Bogie: A Celebration of the Life and Films of Humphrey Bogart (2006) ISBN 0-312-36629-9
- The Essential Chaplin: Perspectives on the Life and Art of the Great Comedian (2006) (editor)
- Clint [Eastwood] A Retrospective (2010)
- Conversations with Scorsese (2011)
- Steven Spielberg: A Retrospective (2012)
- Keepers: The Greatest Films - and Personal Favorites - of a Moviegoing Lifetime (2015)

== Documentaries ==
- The Men Who Made the Movies (1973), eight-part series, PBS, Emmy nominated
- Into the Morning: Willa Cather's America (1975)
- Life Goes to the Movies (writer, 1976), NBC, Emmy nominated
- The Making of Star Wars (writer, 1977), ABC
- Funny Business (1978), CBS
- The Horror Show (1979), CBS
- SP FX: The Empire Strikes Back (writer, 1980), CBS
- James Cagney: That Yankee Doodle Dandy (1981), PBS
- From Star Wars to Jedi: The Making of a Saga (writer, 1983), PBS
- Minnelli on Minnelli: Liza Remembers Vincente (1987), PBS, Emmy nominated
- Happy Anniversary 007: 25 Years of James Bond (writer, 1987), ABC
- Cary Grant: A Celebration of a Leading Man (writer, 1988), ABC
- Gary Cooper: American Life, American Legend (1989), TNT
- Myrna Loy: So Nice to Come Home to (1991), TNT
- Barbara Stanwyck: Fire and Desire (1991), TNT
- Eastwood & Co : Making Unforgiven (1992), ABC
- Hollywood on Hollywood (1993), AMC
- Elia Kazan: A Director's Journey (1995), AMC, Emmy nominated
- Eastwood on Eastwood (1997)
- The Harryhausen Chronicles (1998), PBS
- AFI's 100 Years...100 Stars: America's Greatest Screen Legends (writer, 1999), CBS
- AFI's 100 Years...100 Laughs: America's Funniest Movies (writer, 2000), CBS
- Shooting War: World War II Combat Cameramen (2000), ABC, Emmy nominated
- Woody Allen: A Life in Film (2002), TCM
- The Men Who Made the Movies: Samuel Fuller (2002), TCM
- Charlie: The Life and Art of Charles Chaplin (2003)
- Scorsese on Scorsese (2004), TCM
- Watch the Skies!: Science Fiction, the 1950s and Us (2005), TCM
- Spielberg on Spielberg (2007), TCM
- Cannes: All Access (2007)
- Ron Howard: 50 Years in Film (2008), TCM
- You Must Remember This: The Warner Bros. Story (2008), three-part series, PBS
- The Eastwood Factor (2010)
- Eastwood Directs: The Untold Story (2013)

== DVD commentaries ==
- The Big Red One
- The Big Trail
- City for Conquest
- Dirty Harry
- La Dolce Vita
- Double Indemnity
- East of Eden
- El Dorado, with actor Edward Asner and author Todd McCarthy
- Gentleman's Agreement, with actresses Celeste Holm and June Havoc
- Gilda
- The Good, the Bad and the Ugly
- Hangover Square
- The Hustler, with actor Paul Newman, film historian Jeff Young and other participants
- Leave Her to Heaven, with actor Darryl Hickman
- The Mark of Zorro
- On the Waterfront, with Elia Kazan biographer Jeff Young
- The Outlaw Josey Wales
- Once Upon a Time in America
- Pin Up Girl
- The Purple Heart
- Rebecca
- Rio Bravo, with filmmaker John Carpenter
- Ryan's Daughter, with director David Lean's wife Lady Sandra Lean, actress Sarah Miles and other participants
- Side Street
- Somebody Up There Likes Me, with director Robert Wise, actors Paul Newman and Robert Loggia, and filmmaker Martin Scorsese
- Strangers on a Train, with filmmaker Peter Bogdanovich, Psycho screenwriter Joseph Stefano, Patricia Highsmith biographer Andrew Wilson and other participants
- Sudden Impact
- Titanic
- Unforgiven
- Whirlpool

== See also ==
- Walt Disney (2015)
