= Robert Guenette =

American film director

- Born: Robert Guenette; January 12, 1935; Holyoke, Massachusetts, United States
- Died: October 31, 2003 (aged 68); Los Angeles, California, United States
- Occupations: film director, screenwriter, television producer
- Years active: 1962–2001
- Known for: Documentaries (The Making of Star Wars, The Man Who Saw Tomorrow, Dinosaur!...)
- Board member of: Robert Guenette Productions; International Documentary Association
- Spouse: Francis Gudemann (1961 - 1994 (her death))
- Children: 1
- Awards: Directors Guild of America Award

Robert Guenette (January 12, 1935 – October 31, 2003) was an American film producer, screenwriter, film director, television director and television producer, recipient of the Directors Guild of America Award.

Guenette is considered one of the first documentary directors to introduce the "newsreel style" in documentaries. He and his son, Mark, were co-founders of the International Documentary Association.

== Filmography ==
=== Writer, cinema ===
- The Defector (1966)
- The Tree (1969)
- The Mysterious Monsters (1975)
- The Man Who Saw Tomorrow (1981)

=== Director, cinema ===
- The Tree (1969)
- The Mysterious Monsters (1975)
- The Man Who Saw Tomorrow (1981)

=== Director, TV documentaries ===
- Our War in Vietnam (1962)
- National Geographic Specials (1965, TV series)
- They've Killed President Lincoln! (1971)
- Appointment with Destiny (1971–1973, TV series, Guenette directed 4 episodes out of a total of 7, and wrote 2)
  - The Plot to Murder Hitler (1971)
  - The Crucifixion of Jesus (1972)
  - Cortez and Montezuma: The Conquest of an Empire (1972)
  - Peary's Race for the North Pole (1973)
- The World Turned Upside Down (1973)
- Monsters! Mysteries or Myths? (1974)
- The Mysterious Monsters (1976)
- The Amazing World of Psychic Phenomena (1976)
- The Making of Star Wars (1977)
- Roots: One Year Later (1978)
- The Hanna-Barbera Hall of Fame: Yabba-Dabba-Doo 2 (1979)
- SP FX: The Empire Strikes Back (1980)
- Great Movie Stunts: Raiders of the Lost Ark (1981)
- Classic Creatures: Return of the Jedi (1983)
- Dinosaur! (1985)
- The Flintstones' 25th Anniversary Celebration (1986)
- Memories Then and Now (1988)
- Here's Looking at You, Warner Bros. (1991)
- Crazy About the Movies: Dennis Hopper (1991)
- Crazy About the Movies: Ava Gardner (1992)
- Orson Welles: What Went Wrong? (1992)
- Celebration of a Life: Steven J. Ross Chairman of Time Warner (1993)
- Golf: The Greatest Game (1994)
- Heroes of the Game (1994)
- Celebrate the Century (1999, TV mini-series documentary)
- Legends, Icons and Superstars of the 20th Century: Five Pop Music Icons (2001)

=== Director, TV movies ===
- Tears of Joy, Tears of Sorrow (1986)

=== Producer, TV movies ===
- Victory at Entebbe (1976)

=== Producer, TV series ===
- Winners (two episodes in 1977 and 1978 as executive producer)

== Awards ==
=== Nominees ===
- 1972: Primetime Emmy Award for Outstanding Achievement in Any Area of Creative Technical Crafts (for The Plot to Murder Hitler)
- 1978: Daytime Emmy Award for Outstanding Children's Entertainment Special (for the episode "I Can" from the series Winners)
- 1978: Daytime Emmy Award for Outstanding Children's Entertainment Special (for the episode "Journey Together" from the series Winners)
- 1982: Primetime Emmy Award for Outstanding Informational Special (for Great Movie Stunts: Raiders of the Lost Ark)

=== Won ===
- 1982: Directors Guild of America Award for Outstanding Directorial Achievement in Documentary (Note: In 1991 this award saw its name changed to Directors Guild of America Award for Outstanding Directing – Documentaries) (for Great Movie Stunts: Raiders of the Lost Ark)
- 2001: International Documentary Association Pioneer Award
