= The Hanna-Barbera Hall of Fame: Yabba Dabba Doo II =

1979 American live-action/animated television series

- Written by: Len Janson
- Directed by: Robert Guenette
- Starring: Bill Bixby
- Voices of: Daws Butler
- Music by: Hoyt Curtin
- Country of origin: United States
- Original language: English

Production
- Executive producers: Joseph Barbera; William Hanna
- Producer: Robert Guenette
- Cinematography: Gil Hubbs
- Editor: Peter Wood
- Running time: 45 minutes
- Production companies: Hanna-Barbera Productions; Robert Guenette Productions

Original release
- Network: CBS
- Release: October 12, 1979

Related
- Yabba Dabba Doo! The Happy World of Hanna-Barbera

The Hanna-Barbera Hall of Fame: Yabba Dabba Doo 2 is a 1979 American live-action/animated television special produced by Hanna-Barbera Productions, which aired on CBS on October 12, 1979. It is a sequel to the 1977 special Yabba Dabba Doo! The Happy World of Hanna-Barbera.

== Summary ==
Bill Bixby hosts a behind-the-scenes look at some of the most famous stars of the animated-cartoon world of Hanna-Barbera's "Hall of Fame" of animal heroes and villains and the careers of William Hanna and Joseph Barbera.

== Cast ==
- Bill Bixby – Host
- Daws Butler – Various character voices
