= Flynn Gray =

Irish actor

- Born: Dublin, Ireland
- Occupation: Actor
- Years active: 2022–present

Flynn Gray is an Irish actor. He is known for portraying Omar in the second season of the Netflix series Wednesday and for being cast in the film Star Wars: Starfighter.

== Career ==
Gray began acting in the early 2020s, appearing in Irish television and short film productions.

In 2023, he appeared in the historical thriller Baltimore, which was later released under the title Rose's War in the United States. The following year, he portrayed Freddie in the horror film Winnie-the-Pooh: Blood and Honey 2.

Gray also appeared in television productions including Borderline, Sherlock & Daughter, Going Dutch and the RTÉ children's comedy-drama Showkids, in which he portrayed Sam across six episodes.

In 2025, Gray appeared in the second season of the Netflix series Wednesday, portraying Omar, one of the Caliban Boys.

Later that year, Lucasfilm announced Gray as part of the cast for Star Wars: Starfighter, directed by Shawn Levy and starring Ryan Gosling, Amy Adams, Matt Smith, Mia Goth and Aaron Pierre.

== Personal life ==
Gray is from Dublin, Ireland.

He is the nephew of Irish entrepreneur and influencer Denise Kenny Byrne who has appeared on the BBC’s Dragon’s Den.

== Filmography ==
=== Film ===
Year	Title	Role	Notes
2023	Baltimore	Patrick	Released as Rose's War in the United States and Germany
2024	Winnie-the-Pooh: Blood and Honey 2	Freddie	
2027	Time Out	Julian	Filming
2027	Star Wars: Starfighter		Post-production

=== Television ===
Year	Title	Role	Notes
2022	The Dry	Finn	Episode: "Mo Chara"
2023	The Santa Stories	Little Boy	Episode: "The Borrowers"
2024	Borderline	Young Boyd	6 episodes
2025	Showkids	Sam	6 episodes
2025	Sherlock & Daughter	Roberto Ricci	Episode: "The Challenge"
2025	Going Dutch	Gabriel	Episode: "Born on the Third of July"
2025	Wednesday	Omar (Caliban Boys)	2 episodes
