= From Star Wars to Jedi: The Making of a Saga =

- Japanese LaserDisc cover
- Genre: TV special/Documentary
- Written by: Richard Schickel
- Starring: Mark Hamill (narrator); George Lucas; John Williams; Ben Burtt
- Composer: John Williams
- Country of origin: United States
- Original language: English
- No. of episodes: 1

Production
- Executive producers: Howard Kazanjian; Sidney Ganis
- Producer: Richard Schickel
- Editor: Duwayne Dunham
- Running time: 65 min
- Production company: Lucasfilm

Original release
- Network: PBS
- Release: December 3, 1983

From Star Wars to Jedi: The Making of a Saga is a 1983 television documentary special that originally aired on PBS on December 3, 1983. It is a behind-the-scenes look at the making of the original Star Wars trilogy, with particular emphasis on the final film, Return of the Jedi.

Narrated by actor Mark Hamill, the documentary was written by Richard Schickel who had written the previous television documentaries The Making of Star Wars (1977) and SP FX: The Empire Strikes Back (1980).

== Synopsis ==
The documentary is primarily a look at the making of the 1983 film Return of the Jedi, which had been released that year. However it includes considerable material and behind-the-scenes footage from Star Wars and The Empire Strikes Back and an extensive interview with Star Wars creator George Lucas who discusses his influences, his original plans, and the process of creating the saga.

The footage of the making of Return of the Jedi includes a look at the creation of the various alien creatures seen in the film (covered in more detail in another 1983 documentary, Classic Creatures: Return of the Jedi), on location in Yuma Desert in Arizona for the sequence aboard Jabba's sail barge, on location in the redwood forests of Northern California for the Endor scenes, the filming of the speeder bike chase sequence, and the creation of the various alien languages and the songs "Lapti Nek" as performed by the character Sy Snootles and the Ewok celebration song at the end of the film.

It also includes footage from the original deleted scene from Star Wars featuring Han Solo's meeting with Jabba the Hutt, who was then played by Irish actor Declan Mulholland. The scene was later restored for the 1997 Special Edition of Star Wars in which a CGI Jabba was superimposed over Mulholland and his dialogue dubbed.

== Home media ==
The documentary was released on home video by 20th Century Fox in the mid 1980s and various times up to the 1990s (with the re-releases all under different cover artwork). It was also released on Laserdisc in Japan. As yet, there are no high-definition releases of the documentary and unlike its predecessors, The Making of Star Wars, SP FX: The Empire Strikes Back and Classic Creatures: Return of the Jedi, it was not included on the 2011 Star Wars Blu-ray boxset of all six films.

In 2014, the documentary was made available for free on the official Star Wars YouTube channel.
