= Star Wars: Starfighter =

Upcoming film directed by Shawn Levy

- Directed by: Shawn Levy
- Written by: Jonathan Tropper
- Based on: Characters by George Lucas
- Produced by: Shawn Levy; Kathleen Kennedy
- Starring: Ryan Gosling; Flynn Gray; Matt Smith; Mia Goth; Aaron Pierre; Simon Bird; Jamael Westman; Daniel Ings; Amy Adams
- Cinematography: Claudio Miranda
- Edited by: Adam Gerstel
- Music by: Thomas Newman
- Production companies: Lucasfilm; 21 Laps Entertainment
- Distributed by: Walt Disney Studios Motion Pictures
- Release date: May 28, 2027
- Country: United States
- Language: English

Star Wars: Starfighter is an upcoming American space opera film directed by Shawn Levy and written by Jonathan Tropper. Produced by Lucasfilm and 21 Laps Entertainment, and set to be distributed by Walt Disney Studios Motion Pictures, it is intended to be an installment in the Star Wars franchise and set five years after the events of the film Star Wars: The Rise of Skywalker (2019). The film stars Ryan Gosling, Flynn Gray, Matt Smith, Mia Goth, Aaron Pierre, Simon Bird, Jamael Westman, Daniel Ings, and Amy Adams.

Levy entered talks to direct a new Star Wars film in November 2022. Development was delayed by the 2023 Writers Guild of America strike and was in the early stages in October 2023. Tropper was hired to write the film in July 2024. The title and Gosling's casting were announced in April 2025, with the full cast announced in August when filming began in the United Kingdom. Filming also occurred in Sardinia, Italy, and concluded in December.

Star Wars: Starfighter is scheduled to be released in the United States on May 28, 2027.

== Cast ==
- Ryan Gosling as Kade Auberon
- Flynn Gray
- Matt Smith
- Mia Goth
- Aaron Pierre
- Simon Bird
- Jamael Westman
- Daniel Ings
- Amy Adams

== Production ==
=== Development ===
Shawn Levy flew to London in the mid-2010s specifically to meet with Lucasfilm president Kathleen Kennedy and express his love for the Star Wars franchise, as well as his wish to make a Star Wars film. The pair began discussing a potential project, but this was put on hold when Levy became busy with the television series Stranger Things (2016–2025). Levy was contacted by Kennedy in 2022, entered talks to develop and direct a new Star Wars film that November, and publicly confirmed the deal a month later. He acknowledged that many filmmakers had been announced as developing Star Wars films that did not come to fruition in recent years, but he was confident this would not be the case for his film and was excited to begin writing it after he finished directing the Marvel Cinematic Universe (MCU) film Deadpool & Wolverine (2024) for Marvel Studios. Development was just beginning when the 2023 Writers Guild of America strike began in May 2023 and halted further progress. That October, after the strike ended, Levy said development had begun again. Kennedy's mandate was for Levy to bring a similar story and tone from his other films to Star Wars, and he was optimistic that he could make a personal film within a big franchise after doing so with Deadpool & Wolverine in the MCU. The following month, Dave Filoni revealed that he was now chief creative officer at Lucasfilm, after serving as executive producer on various Star Wars television series, and would be directly involved in the planning of future films and series.

Jonathan Tropper, a previous collaborator of Levy's, was hired to write the film in July 2024. That December, journalist Jeff Sneider reported that Levy was "holding a window" for production to begin in September 2025. He further reported that Daisy Ridley would reprise her role as Rey from the Star Wars sequel trilogy, taking on a mentorship role for a teenage boy or young man who would be the protagonist. Ridley was also reported to have a similar role in other Star Wars films that were in development from director Sharmeen Obaid-Chinoy and writer Simon Kinberg, separately. In January 2025, Ryan Gosling entered talks to star in the lead role. Levy was planning to direct a different film next, but Gosling's interest meant this film could move forward first and potentially start filming in late 2025. The director and his production company, 21 Laps Entertainment, were set to produce the film with Kennedy and Lucasfilm. Levy was considered a "must-have, must-keep director" for the Walt Disney Company, parent of both Lucasfilm and Marvel Studios, after the success of Deadpool & Wolverine. Kennedy said this would be the next Star Wars film after The Mandalorian and Grogu (2026) and it would be set around five or six years after Star Wars: The Rise of Skywalker (2019), the last film in the "Skywalker Saga" and the sequel trilogy. She said it would be separate from the Skywalker Saga and feature mostly new characters, but some sequel trilogy characters could return. It was intended to be standalone and not launch any sequels.

=== Pre-production ===
At Star Wars Celebration Japan in April 2025, the film was titled Star Wars: Starfighter, which is also the name of an unrelated 2001 video game; it was given a release date of May 28, 2027; Gosling was confirmed to be starring; and Levy confirmed that filming would begin later that year. Casting was underway for a teenage actor to portray the nephew of Gosling's character, and for male and female antagonists who pursue them. Mikey Madison was in brief negotiations for the female antagonist role, but declined an offer by mid-April due to a salary dispute. Mia Goth was cast in that role in June. Matt Smith, who was cast in an undisclosed role for The Rise of Skywalker but ultimately did not appear in that film, joined Starfighter as another antagonist in August. Levy later acknowledged the reports of Smith's initial The Rise of Skywalker casting and said it "feels like it's destiny fulfilled" for the actor to be joining the Star Wars franchise in Starfighter. With the start of filming at the end of August, Lucasfilm confirmed the casting of Smith and Goth, and announced the casting of newcomer Flynn Gray alongside Aaron Pierre, Simon Bird, Jamael Westman, Daniel Ings, and Amy Adams. Gray was cast as the nephew of Gosling's character, while Adams was cast as the mother of Gray's character.

Levy said there was unique pressure making the film, even after working on big projects like Deadpool & Wolverine and Stranger Things, because "nothing is as religious an allegiance as Star Wars" for the franchise's fans. He elaborated that the film was "not a sequel, it's not a prequel, it's not legacy characters. And it's not in a period of time in the galaxy that's ever been explored... What this means is that we are inventing everything in the movie. And the desire to make design choices, character choices, planet choices, costume choices, droid choices, alien choices, all of it needs to feel Star Wars-y." Tropper described it as a "simpler movie" than the Skywalker Saga films, free from the franchise's mythology with "as few barriers of entry as possible for new fans and viewers". Levy said the previous Star Wars film that most inspired Starfighter was Return of the Jedi (1983), because of "the combination of theme, levity, adventure, heart, spectacle. Somehow that movie just got it right for me." Costume designer Suttirat Anne Larlarb returned from the Star Wars television series Obi-Wan Kenobi (2022).

=== Filming ===
Principal photography began on August 28, 2025, in the United Kingdom, with Claudio Miranda as the cinematographer. By mid-September, filming was taking place in Sardinia, Italy. Levy released an image of filming taking place in the Mediterranean Sea. In early November, Levy took a short break from filming to promote the fifth season of Stranger Things (2025). Filming was more than halfway complete by then. At the end of the month, Levy said there was part of the film's third act where "things didn't align" and his original plans were forced to change. Levy was filming the new version of this at the time and said he was glad that the original idea did not work out, feeling that the new idea was much better. Smith filmed his scenes in December. Levy announced that filming had wrapped on December 18.

Kennedy said it was risky for a film to rely on an inexperienced child actor and said they got lucky with Gray. She added that the film's structure meant he was "one-on-one" with a different major actor every few weeks, saying it was "the best university" for a young actor. Both Steven Spielberg and Tom Cruise visited the set during filming, with Cruise serving as a camera operator for a lightsaber duel set in a boggy marsh. In October 2026, Disney disclosed that the gross cost for the film through the end of principal photography was $226.5 million, with a net cost of $175 million after the company received $51.5 million in tax credits from the UK government.

=== Post-production ===
Adam Gerstel edited the film, after doing so for the second season of The Mandalorian (2020).

== Music ==
Levy revealed in November 2025 that Thomas Newman was composing the score. The director wanted the music to be "big-hearted", "classically inspired", and use multiple musical themes to tell the story, similar to John Williams's music for the main Star Wars films, but not be a "remix" of Williams's music. Newman, the composer for some of Levy's favorite film scores, agreed to join after reading the script and hearing Levy's vision.

== Marketing ==
Footage from the film was shown at CineEurope in June 2026. Levy and Gosling promoted the film at Disney's D23 convention in August, where more footage was shown.

== Release ==
Star Wars: Starfighter is scheduled to be released in the United States on May 28, 2027. The film is expected to be released in IMAX.
