= Classic Creatures: Return of the Jedi =

1983 American television documentary

- Japanese LaserDisc cover
- Genre: TV Special/Documentary
- Written by: Robert Guenette & Greg O'Neill
- Directed by: Robert Guenette
- Starring: Carrie Fisher (presenter); Billy Dee Williams (presenter)
- Composer: John Williams
- Country of origin: United States
- Original language: English
- No. of episodes: 1

Production
- Executive producers: Sidney Ganis; Howard Kazanjian
- Producer: Robert Guenette
- Editor: Peter Wood
- Running time: 48 min
- Production companies: Lucasfilm; Twentieth Century Fox Television

Original release
- Network: CBS
- Release: November 21, 1983

Classic Creatures: Return of the Jedi is a television documentary, first broadcast on CBS on November 21, 1983. It is a look behind-the-scenes of the creation of the various alien creatures from the third Star Wars film, Return of the Jedi, which was released that year. The documentary was presented by Star Wars actors Carrie Fisher and Billy Dee Williams, and directed by Robert Guenette who had directed the previous television specials The Making of Star Wars (1977) and SP FX: The Empire Strikes Back (1980).

== Synopsis ==
Hosted by Carrie Fisher and Billy Dee Williams, the special includes an interview with Star Wars creator George Lucas who elaborates on the evolution of the Ewoks, Sy Snootles (or "Miss Snooty" as Carrie Fisher calls her) and Jabba the Hutt, which required six people to operate. It also includes location footage from the redwood forests of Northern California (where the Endor scenes were filmed, Buttercup Valley in the Yuma Desert in Arizona, where the sequence aboard Jabba's sail barge was shot, and various scenes on the soundstages at Elstree Studios near London where the interiors of Jabba's palace were filmed. Over 60 alien creatures were created for Return of the Jedi which were operated by a variety of techniques old and new. Footage from earlier films illustrated the various methods used, including using actors in costumes (as in Creature from the Black Lagoon and Godzilla), stop motion miniatures (as seen in The Beast from 20,000 Fathoms and King Kong), and large-scale mechanicals (as seen in Them!). Some of the creatures (such as Yoda and the Rancor) were mainly puppeteered but also contained animatronic devices that could be controlled remotely. The documentary also includes scenes from more recent "creature" films from the era such as E.T., The Dark Crystal (along with a brief interview with its director Jim Henson), and Dragonslayer (which pioneered the use of "go-motion" techniques in which a miniature creature and the camera are simultaneously computer controlled).

Much of the documentary was included in the TV special From Star Wars to Jedi: The Making of a Saga that was made the same year.

== Home video release ==
The documentary has been released on video several times since the 1980s, and also on LaserDisc in Japan (where it was issued both separately and as part of a triple feature with The Making of Star Wars and SP FX: The Empire Strikes Back). It is also included as an extra feature on the Star Wars Blu-ray box set which was released in September 2011.
