= The Making of Star Wars =

- Japanese LaserDisc cover
- The Making of 'Star Wars' ....as told by C-3PO and R2-D2
- Genre: TV Special/Documentary
- Written by: Richard Schickel
- Directed by: Robert Guenette
- Presented by: Anthony Daniels
- Narrated by: William Conrad
- Composer: John Williams
- Country of origin: United States
- Original language: English

Production
- Executive producer: Gary Kurtz
- Producer: Robert Guenette
- Editor: N.H. Cominos
- Running time: 49 minutes
- Production companies: 20th Century Fox Television; The Star Wars Corporation

Original release
- Network: ABC
- Release: September 16, 1977

The Making of Star Wars is a television special produced by 20th Century Fox Television, which aired on ABC on September 16, 1977. It was written by Richard Schickel and directed and produced by Robert Guenette.

== Synopsis ==
Premiering four months after the release of the film, the special was the first Star Wars documentary ever made. The special was hosted by C-3PO (voiced and played by Anthony Daniels) and R2-D2. A voiceover narration was additionally supplied by William Conrad. It features behind-the-scenes footage from Star Wars, and interviews with writer/director George Lucas, producer Gary Kurtz, and castmembers Mark Hamill, Carrie Fisher, Harrison Ford, and Alec Guinness.

Among the behind-the-scenes footage is a brief glimpse of a deleted scene between Luke Skywalker and Biggs Darklighter on Tatooine.

== Home media ==
The special was the first Star Wars material to be released to the home video market (in 1979, by Magnetic Video). It was reissued to video in 1980 with a trailer for The Empire Strikes Back, which had been released that year. This trailer was not featured on the DVD box set issued in 2004.

In 1982, it was reissued again by 20th Century Fox on VHS, Betamax, CED, and Laserdisc as part of a double feature with the 1980 special SP FX: The Empire Strikes Back. It was reissued separately in Japan on Laserdisc in 1992, and was reissued as a triple feature with SPFX and the 1983 special Classic Creatures: Return of the Jedi.

The special is included as an additional feature in the Star Wars: The Complete Saga Blu-ray box set, which was released in September 2011.

== Alternate version ==
In 1995, an alternate version of the special was released on VHS as a special mail-in offer with Kellogg's to tie in with the last video releases of the unaltered versions of the original Star Wars trilogy. This version is almost identical to the 1977 version but replaces William Conrad's voiceover with that of famed movie trailer announcer Don LaFontaine. This version has not been issued on DVD nor any other format.

Some portions of the special were edited into The Story of Star Wars, a DVD that was issued as a promotional bonus available at Wal-Mart stores for the DVD release of Star Wars: Episode III – Revenge of the Sith in 2005.
