= SP FX: The Empire Strikes Back =

- Japanese LaserDisc cover
- Genre: TV Special/Documentary
- Written by: Richard Schickel
- Directed by: Robert Guenette
- Starring: Mark Hamill (host)
- Composer: John Williams
- Country of origin: United States
- Original language: English

Production
- Producers: Robert Guenette; Richard Schickel
- Editor: Peter Wood
- Running time: 48 min
- Production company: Lucasfilm

Original release
- Network: CBS
- Release: September 22, 1980

SP FX: The Empire Strikes Back is a television documentary special which originally aired on CBS on September 22, 1980. Hosted by actor Mark Hamill, it is a behind-the-scenes look at the creation of the special effects (SP FX) in the second Star Wars film, The Empire Strikes Back, which was released that year. The special was written by Richard Schickel and directed by Robert Guenette, who had both previously worked on the 1977 special The Making of Star Wars.

== Synopsis ==
The special was hosted by Mark Hamill, who plays Luke Skywalker in the original Star Wars trilogy. It features behind-the-scenes footage from Star Wars Episode V: The Empire Strikes Back, and shows the making of various special effects sequences including the Imperial probe droid, the Tauntaun and Wampa ice creatures of the planet Hoth, the battle between the Imperial AT-AT Walkers and the Rebel Snowspeeders, the asteroid field sequence, the lightsaber duel between Luke and Darth Vader, and the Dagobah scenes and creation of the character Yoda which was voiced and performed by Frank Oz. It includes brief interviews with actor Peter Mayhew (Chewbacca) and sound designer Ben Burtt, and footage of various key crewmembers at work including director Irvin Kershner, composer John Williams, assistant director Bill Westley, special effects personnel Richard Edlund, Dennis Muren, and Brian Johnson, matte artist Harrison Ellenshaw, and creature designer Stuart Freeborn.

As well as showing how effects from Empire were made, the documentary reflects on the history of special effects in movies and includes clips from landmark effects films such as The Lost World, King Kong, Flash Gordon, Things to Come, The Thief of Baghdad, The Beast from 20,000 Fathoms, Them!, Mary Poppins, 2001: A Space Odyssey, The Hindenburg, the first Star Wars film, and Close Encounters of the Third Kind. In the wake of the then-new revolution in special effects pioneered by 2001 and Star Wars, it also shows clips from several amateur special effects films including the Star Wars parody Hardware Wars, in which kitchen items such as whisks, toasters and irons engaged in a space battle in lieu of spaceships. A section devoted to several grade school children making their own rudimentary special effects was also shown.

== Home media ==
The special was the second Star Wars material to be released to the home video market (in 1981). It was reissued to video in 1982 by 20th Century Fox on VHS, Betamax, CED, and Laserdisc as part of a double feature with the 1977 special The Making of Star Wars. It was reissued separately in Japan on Laserdisc in 1992, and was also reissued as a triple feature with The Making of Star Wars and the 1983 special Classic Creatures: Return of the Jedi.

The special was also included in PAL format VHS as part of the limited edition "ISSD Executor" metal box set in 1995.

The special is included as an additional feature on the Star Wars Blu-ray box set, released in September 2011.

== Reception ==
Colin Greenland reviewed SPFX for Imagine magazine, and stated that "this CBS/Fox video is full of interesting glimpses behind the scenes where puppet-masters and model-makers can toil for eight weeks to produce a shot that lasts one second."
