= Kevin Moore (disambiguation) =

Kevin Moore is an American keyboardist and composer, formerly of Dream Theater.

Kevin Moore may also refer to:

== Musicians ==
- Keb' Mo' (Kevin Moore, born 1951), American blues singer, songwriter and guitarist
- Luka Bloom (Kevin Barry Moore, born 1955), Irish folk rock singer-songwriter

== Sportspeople ==
- Kevin Moore (sprinter), Australian and Maltese sprinter
- Kevin Moore (Australian rules footballer) (born 1954), Australian rules footballer for Melbourne
- Kevin Moore (footballer, born 1956), English football winger for Blackpool, Bury, Newport County, Swindon Town and Swansea City
- Kevin Moore (footballer, born 1957), English football midfielder for Shrewsbury Town
- Kevin Moore (footballer, born 1958) (1958–2013), English football defender for Grimsby Town, Oldham Athletic, Southampton, Bristol Rovers and Fulham
- Kevin Moore (rugby league) (born 1965), Australian rugby league football coach and former player

== Others ==
- Kevin Moore (art historian) (born 1964), art historian and curator
- K. Michael Moore (born 1951), American judge
- Kevin Moore, presenter of The Moore Show

== See also ==
- Kev Moore (born 1958), English bass player and vocalist
- Michael Kevin Moore (born 1965), Scottish politician
