= List of Star Wars original trilogy characters =

Characters in the 1977–1983 movie trilogy

This incomplete list contains only the major characters and storylines featured in the three films of the Star Wars original trilogy.

== Background ==
The original Star Wars trilogy is the first set of three films produced in the Star Wars franchise, an American space opera created by George Lucas. It was produced by Lucasfilm and distributed by 20th Century Fox, and consists of Star Wars (1977), (Note: Later titled Star Wars: Episode IV – A New Hope) The Empire Strikes Back (1980) and Return of the Jedi (1983). Beginning in medias res, the original trilogy serves as the second act of the nine-episode Skywalker saga. It was followed by a prequel trilogy between 1999 and 2005, and a sequel trilogy between 2015 and 2019. Collectively, they are referred to as the "Skywalker Saga" to distinguish them from spin-off films set within the same universe.

The original Star Wars film received widespread acclaim from critics for its storytelling, characters, John Williams' musical score and its groundbreaking visual and sound effects.

Thousands of actors were assessed in the search for the trilogy's main cast. The selected actors are considered by many viewers to have onscreen chemistry even though some of them were inexperienced, with the notable exceptions of Alec Guinness and Peter Cushing. Some, like Ford, have called the dialogue in the scripts clunky, and several lines were unscripted; some of these are considered the most memorable moments in the films. (Note: Ford's lines "We're fine. We're all fine here, now, thank you. How are you?" in A New Hope and "I know" in The Empire Strikes Back were improvised, and Mark Hamill (Luke Skywalker) was not aware he was being filmed when he said "I can't see a thing in this helmet" during the filming of A New Hope.)

== Main cast ==
List indicators

This section includes characters who will appear or have appeared in the series.

- An empty grey cell indicates the character was not in the film, or that the character's official presence has not yet been confirmed.
- ^{C} indicates a cameo role.
- ^{E} indicates an appearance not included in the theatrical cut.
- ^{V} indicates a voice-only role.
- ^{Y} indicates a younger version of the character.

Character	Star Wars (1977)	The Empire Strikes Back (1980)	Return of the Jedi (1983)
Luke Skywalker	Mark Hamill	Mark Hamill	Mark Hamill
Han Solo	Harrison Ford	Harrison Ford	Harrison Ford
Princess Leia Organa	Carrie Fisher	Carrie Fisher	Carrie Fisher
Grand Moff Tarkin	Peter Cushing		
Obi-Wan Kenobi / "Old Ben"	Alec Guinness	Alec Guinness	Alec Guinness
C-3PO	Anthony Daniels	Anthony Daniels	Anthony Daniels
R2-D2	Kenny Baker	Kenny Baker	Kenny Baker
Chewbacca	Peter Mayhew	Peter Mayhew	Peter Mayhew
Anakin Skywalker / Darth Vader	David Prowse, James Earl Jones^{V}	David Prowse, James Earl Jones^{V}	David Prowse, James Earl Jones^{V}, Sebastian Shaw, Hayden Christensen^{E}^{Y}
Lando Calrissian		Billy Dee Williams	Billy Dee Williams
Yoda		Frank Oz	Frank Oz
The Emperor		Elaine Baker, Clive Revill^{V} Ian McDiarmid^{E}	Ian McDiarmid

== Main characters ==
=== Luke Skywalker ===
Luke Skywalker is a young adult raised by his aunt and uncle on Tatooine, who dreams of something more than his current life and learns about the Force and the Jedi. Eventually, he becomes a pilot in the Rebel Alliance and an apprentice Jedi. After training with Obi-Wan Kenobi and Yoda, he is one of the last living Jedi Knights.

The character was portrayed by Mark Hamill in all three films.

Lucas favored casting young actors who lacked long experience. To play Luke (then known as Luke Starkiller), Lucas sought actors who could project intelligence and integrity. While reading the script, Hamill found the dialogue to be extremely odd because of its universe-embedded concepts. He chose to simply read it sincerely, and he was cast instead of William Katt, who was subsequently cast in Brian De Palma's Carrie (Lucas shared a joint casting session with De Palma, a longtime friend). Robby Benson, Will Seltzer, Charles Martin Smith and Kurt Russell also auditioned for the role.

=== Han Solo ===
Han Solo is a cynical smuggler and captain of the Millennium Falcon. He becomes a general in the rebellion, and Leia's love interest.

The character was portrayed by Harrison Ford in all three films.

Lucas initially rejected casting Ford for the role, as he "wanted new faces"; Ford had previously worked with Lucas on American Graffiti. Instead, Lucas asked Ford to assist in the auditions by reading lines with the other actors and explaining the concepts and history behind the scenes that they were reading. Lucas was eventually won over by Ford's portrayal and cast him instead of Kurt Russell, Nick Nolte, Sylvester Stallone, Bill Murray, Christopher Walken, Burt Reynolds, Jack Nicholson, James Caan, Robert De Niro, Al Pacino, Steve Martin, Chevy Chase, or Perry King (who later played Han Solo in the radio plays).

=== Leia Organa ===
Leia Organa is the princess of the planet Alderaan who is a member of the Imperial Senate and, secretly, one of the leaders of the Rebel Alliance.

The character was portrayed by Carrie Fisher in all three films.

Many young Hollywood actresses auditioned for the role of Princess Leia, including Amy Irving, Terri Nunn, Cindy Williams, Linda Purl, Karen Allen, and Jodie Foster. Koo Stark was considered but ended up getting the role of Camie Marstrap, Luke Skywalker's friend, a character that didn't make the final cut of the film. (Note: Also reportedly considered were Kathleen Turner, Sigourney Weaver, Meryl Streep, Kim Basinger, Glenn Close, Jane Seymour, Cybill Shepherd, Jessica Lange, Geena Davis, Anjelica Huston, Sissy Spacek, and Farrah Fawcett.) Fisher was cast under the condition that she lose 10 pounds (4.5 kg) for the role.

=== Grand Moff Tarkin ===
Grand Moff Tarkin is the Imperial commander of the Death Star.

The character was portrayed by Peter Cushing in A New Hope.

Lucas originally offered the role to Christopher Lee but he declined. Lucas originally had Cushing in mind for the role of Obi-Wan Kenobi, but Lucas believed that "his lean features" would be better employed in the role of Tarkin instead. Lucas commended Cushing's performance, saying "[He] is a very good actor. Adored and idolized by young people and by people who go to see a certain kind of movie. I feel he will be fondly remembered for the next 350 years at least." Cushing, commenting on his role, joked: "I've often wondered what a 'Grand Moff' was. It sounds like something that flew out of a cupboard."

=== Obi-Wan Kenobi ===
Obi-Wan Kenobi, also known as Ben Kenobi or Old Ben, is an aging Jedi Master and veteran of the Clone Wars who introduces Luke to the Force.

The character was portrayed by Alec Guinness in all three films.

Lucas's decision to cast "unknowns" was not taken favorably by his friend Francis Ford Coppola and the studio, so Lucas decided Obi-Wan Kenobi should be played by an established actor. Producer Gary Kurtz said, "The Alec Guinness role required a certain stability and gravitas as a character... which meant we needed a very, very strong character actor to play that part." Before Guinness was cast, Japanese actor Toshiro Mifune (who starred in many Akira Kurosawa films) was considered for the role. According to Mifune's daughter, Mika Kitagawa, her father turned down Lucas' offers to play Kenobi and Darth Vader because "he was concerned about how the film would look and that it would cheapen the image of samurai... At the time, sci-fi movies still looked quite cheap as the effects were not advanced and he had a lot of samurai pride." Guinness was one of the few cast members who believed that the film would be successful; he negotiated a deal for 2.25% of the one-fifth gross royalties paid to Lucas, which made him quite wealthy in later life. He agreed to take the part of Kenobi on the condition that he would not have to do any publicity to promote the film. Lucas credited him with inspiring the cast and crew to work harder, saying that Guinness contributed significantly to the completion of the filming. Harrison Ford said, "It was, for me, fascinating to watch Alec Guinness. He was always prepared, always professional, always very kind to the other actors. He had a very clear head about how to serve the story."

=== C-3PO ===
C-3PO, or See Threepio, is a protocol droid affiliated with the Rebellion who is "fluent in over six million forms of communication".

The character was portrayed by Anthony Daniels in all three films.

Daniels auditioned for and was cast as C-3PO; he has said that he wanted the role after he saw a Ralph McQuarrie drawing of the character and was struck by the vulnerability in the robot's face. Initially, Lucas did not intend to use Daniels' voice for C-3PO. Thirty well-established voice actors read for the voice of the droid. According to Daniels, one of the major voice actors, believed by some sources to be Stan Freberg, recommended Daniels' voice for the role. Mel Blanc was considered for the role, but according to Daniels, Blanc told Lucas that Daniels was better for the part. Richard Dreyfuss was also considered.

=== R2-D2 ===
R2-D2, or Artoo Detoo, is an astromech droid and C-3PO's companion, who is carrying the Death Star plans and a secret message for Obi-Wan from Princess Leia.

The character was portrayed by Kenny Baker in all three films.

When filming was under way in London, where additional casting took place, Baker, performing a musical comedy act with his acting partner Jack Purvis, learned that the film crew was looking for a small person to fit inside a robot suit and maneuver it. Baker, who was 3 feet 8 inches (1.12 m) tall, was cast immediately after meeting George Lucas. He said, "He saw me come in and said 'He'll do' because I was the smallest guy they'd seen up until then." He initially turned down the role three times, hesitant to appear in a film where his face would not be shown and hoping to continue the success of his comedy act, which had recently started to be televised. R2-D2's recognizable beeps and squeaks were made by sound designer Ben Burtt imitating "baby noises", recording this voice as it was heard on an intercom, and creating the final mix using a synthesizer.

=== Chewbacca ===
Chewbacca is a Wookiee, Han Solo's sidekick, and first mate of the Millennium Falcon.

The character was portrayed by Peter Mayhew in all three films.

Mayhew learned of a casting call for Star Wars, which was being shot in London, and decided to audition. The 7-foot-3-inch (2.21 m) tall actor was immediately cast as Chewbacca after he stood up to greet Lucas. He recounted, "I sat down on one of the sofas, waiting for George. Door opened, and George walked in with Gary behind him. So, naturally, what did I do? I'm raised in England. Soon as someone comes in through the door, I stand up. George goes 'Hmm [looked up].' Virtually turned to Gary, and said 'I think we've found him.' As a result of his height, Mayhew was eligible for either the role of Chewbacca or Darth Vader, ultimately choosing the former because he wanted to play a hero in the story. Mayhew modeled his performance of Chewbacca after the mannerisms of animals he saw at public zoos.

=== Anakin Skywalker / Darth Vader ===
Darth Vader is Obi-Wan's former Jedi apprentice, who fell to the dark side of the Force.

The character was portrayed by David Prowse in the suit. Lucas dismissed Prowse for the character's voice due to his West Country English accent, which led to him being nicknamed "Darth Farmer" by the other cast members. James Earl Jones served as the voice of Darth Vader; he was uncredited until 1983. Lucas originally intended for Orson Welles to voice the character after dismissing Prowse. However, determining that Welles' voice would be too familiar to audiences, Lucas instead cast then-relatively less recognizable Jones.

In Return of the Jedi, after Anakin is redeemed by his son, Sebastian Shaw portrays the character when the helmet is removed. He also portrays the Force spirit of Anakin seen at the end of the film, though this footage was replaced with Hayden Christensen as the younger Anakin from the prequel trilogy in the Special Edition of the film.

=== Lando Calrissian ===
Lando Calrissian is the administrator of Cloud City, and an old friend and rival of Han Solo.

The character was portrayed by Billy Dee Williams in The Empire Strikes Back and Return of the Jedi.

=== Yoda ===
Yoda is a wise, centuries-old Jedi Master of an unknown diminutive alien species, who lives in exile on Dagobah and trained Luke.

The character was voiced and puppeteered by Frank Oz in The Empire Strikes Back and Return of the Jedi.

=== The Emperor ===
The Emperor is the founder and supreme ruler of the Galactic Empire and Darth Vader's Sith master.

The character was first physically portrayed by Elaine Baker and voiced by Clive Revill in the theatrical release of The Empire Strikes Back. Ian McDiarmid would fully take over the role in Return of the Jedi, and the 2004 release of the Special Editions replaced the version in Empire with a new performance by McDiarmid to maintain internal consistency.

== Other notable characters ==
=== Alderaan ===
==== Captain Antilles ====
Captain Antilles commanded the Tantive IV as it carried Princess Leia and the stolen Death Star plans. The ship was captured by Imperial forces, and Antilles was interrogated and killed by Darth Vader after refusing to reveal the location of the plans after they were sent with C-3PO and R2-D2 to the surface of Tatooine.

The character was portrayed by Peter Geddis in A New Hope. The character was later portrayed by Rohan Nichol and Tim Beckmann in the prequel films Revenge of the Sith and Rogue One respectively. A character named Wedge Antilles appears later in the film and the rest of the original trilogy, but they have no relation.

=== Tatooine ===
==== Owen and Beru Lars ====
Owen and Beru Lars are moisture farmers on Tatooine and the guardians of Luke Skywalker. They are killed by stormtroopers while Luke is away attempting to track down the lost astromech droid R2-D2.

The characters have been portrayed by Phil Brown and Shelagh Fraser in A New Hope. Younger versions of the characters were also portrayed by Joel Edgerton and Bonnie Piesse in Attack of the Clones, Revenge of the Sith, and Obi-Wan Kenobi.

=== Bespin ===
==== Lobot ====
Lobot is Lando Calrissian's cyborg aide on Bespin. After the Empire takes over Cloud City, Lando is able to use Lobot's cybernetic connections to evade Imperial capture.

The character has been portrayed by John Hollis in The Empire Strikes Back.

=== Rebel Alliance ===
==== Battle of Yavin ====
In A New Hope, the Battle of Yavin serves as the chronological reference point for the franchise's in-universe dating system (years are denoted as Before or After the Battle of Yavin, BBY/ABY). The Rebels' Red and Gold Squadrons, piloting X-wings and Y-wings respectively, barely manage to destroy the Death Star as it closes in on the Rebel base on Yavin 4.

- General Dodonna (Alex McCrindle) – leader at the Yavin base who devised the plan to destroy the first Death Star
- General Willard (Eddie Byrne, voice dubbed by Michael Bell) – sector commander at Yavin
- Red Leader / Garven Dreis (Drewe Henley, credited as Drewe Hemley) – KIA, shot down by Darth Vader
- Red Two / Wedge Antilles (Denis Lawson) – survived
- Red Three / Biggs Darklighter (Garrick Hagon) – Luke's childhood friend from Tatooine, KIA, shot down by Darth Vader
- Red Four / John D. Branon (Jack Klaff) – KIA
- Red Five / Luke Skywalker (Mark Hamill) – survived, successfully destroyed the Death Star
- Red Six / Jek Porkins (William Hootkins) – KIA
- Gold Leader / Jon "Dutch" Vander (Angus MacInnes, credited as Angus McInnis) – KIA
- Gold Two / Dex Tiree (Jeremy Sinden, voice dubbed by Harry Shearer) – KIA, shot down by Darth Vader
- Gold Five / Davish Krail (Graham Ashley) – KIA

==== Battle of Hoth ====
In The Empire Strikes Back, the Empire locates the new Rebel base on Hoth and attempts to wipe them out with a ground assault.

- Major Derlin (John Ratzenberger) – a Rebel security officer in charge of the Hoth base doors
- Hobbie Klivian (Richard Oldfield, dubbed by Corey Burton and Robert Clotworthy) – Rebel pilot
- Dak Ralter (John Morton) – Luke's co-pilot, KIA
- General Rieekan (Bruce Boa) – commander of the Rebel forces on Hoth
- Zev Senesca (Christopher Malcolm) – Rebel pilot who finds Luke and Han after the Wampa incident

==== Battle of Endor ====
In Return of the Jedi, the Battle of Endor is the Rebel Alliance's attempt to destroy the second Death Star before it becomes operational, representing the culmination of their efforts. However, the Rebels' information was carefully provided by the Emperor himself to lure the entire Rebel fleet into a trap. The Rebel fleet proceeds with engaging the Empire's fleet while a ground crew on the forest moon work to deactivate the operational Death Star's force field.

- Admiral Ackbar – a Mon Calamari pilot and strategist, the foremost military commander of the Rebel Alliance by the time of the Battle of Endor. Ackbar was originally planned to be more conventionally humanoid, but after Star Wars creator George Lucas decided to make him an alien. Ackbar was realized in Return of the Jedi through the use of either a half-body puppet or full-body costume, depending on the camera angle required. He was portrayed by puppeteer Timothy D. Rose, who originally played other characters, but requested to also play Ackbar after seeing his sculpt on a display stand. Ackbar was voiced by Erik Bauersfeld, who made up the voice on the spot after looking at a photograph of Ackbar.
- General Madine (Dermot Crowley, voice dubbed by John Hostetter) – a general and strategist who devised the Endor plan
- Mon Mothma (Caroline Blakiston) – a leader of the Rebel Alliance
- Nien Nunb – a Sullustan pilot who fought in the Battle of Endor, serving alongside Lando Calrissian as co-pilot of the Millennium Falcon as they destroyed the second Death Star. The character was introduced in Return of the Jedi where he was brought to life both as a puppet and a costumed actor during the film. Nunb was puppeteered by Mike Quinn and was portrayed by Richard Bonehill in wide shots. The character was voiced by Kipsang Rotich, a Kenyan student who spoke in his native Kalenjin, as well as in Kikuyu.
- Wicket (Warwick Davis) – the first Ewok encountered by the Rebel forces on the forest moon of Endor

=== Imperial Officers ===
- Sim Aloo (Anthony Lang) – Emperor’s adviser
- General Bast (Leslie Schofield) – general of ground forces stationed at the Death Star
- Officer Gherant (Pip Miller) – served on the bridge of the Executor
- Moff Jerjerrod (Michael Pennington) – oversaw the construction of the second Death Star
- Admiral Motti (Richard LeParmentier) – officer aboard the first Death Star who wanted to brashly use the Death Star and showed disdain towards the old ways of the Force, prompting discipline from Lord Vader
- Captain Needa (Michael Culver) – pursued the Millennium Falcon, and was executed by Darth Vader following its escape
- Admiral Ozzel (Michael Sheard) – commanded the Imperial fleet over Hoth, but performed a tactical blunder that alerted the Rebels to their presence, and was subsequently executed by Vader
- Admiral Piett (Kenneth Colley) – Piett is an Imperial officer who originally served as a captain of the Executor, before his promotion to Admiral following Ozzel being relieved of duty. Piett is tasked with tracking down the Millennium Falcon following its escape from Hoth. Piett later commands the Imperial fleet at Endor.
- General Tagge (Don Henderson) – chief of military operations aboard the first Death Star, credited as General Taggi
- General Veers (Julian Glover) – led the ground assault against the Rebels on Hoth

=== Criminal underworld ===
==== Mos Eisley ====
- Ponda Baba – an Aqualish enforcer for the notorious Doctor Evazan. Baba threatens Luke Skywalker in Mos Eisley, prompting Ben to defend him and slice off Baba's arm with his lightsaber. He was originally marketed by Kenner as "Walrus Man".
- BoShek (Basil Tomlin) – a Corellian smuggler and pilot-for-hire
- Figrin D'an – a Bith musician, and leader of the band "Figrin D'an and the Modal Nodes" that perform the diegetic music in Mos Eisley
- Doctor Evazan – a serial killer who experiments on his patients, granting him the death sentence on 12 star systems.
- Garindan – a Kubaz spy who leads Imperial stormtroopers to the Millennium Falcon after Luke and Ben leave Mos Eisley. Archival recordings of John Wayne were heavily synthesized and used for the character's voice.
- Greedo – a Rodian bounty hunter employed by Jabba the Hutt. After confronting and threatening Han Solo in Mos Eisley cantina, Greedo is shot and killed by Solo. Greedo is central to the "Han shot first" controversy introduced with the release of the Special Editions. The character was portrayed by Paul Blake in A New Hope, with pick-up shots being portrayed by Maria De Aragon. The character's articulated head and pyrotechnic effect after being shot were designed and built by John Stears. Linguist Larry Ward performed the voice in a simplified form of Quechua, the Inca language.
- Dannik Jerriko (Roy Staite) – Anzati bounty hunter
- Kabe – Chadra-Fan cantina patron and partner of Muftak
- Nabrun Leids – Morseerian smuggler and pilot
- Muftak – Talz pickpocket
- Myo – Abyssin fighter referred to as the "Cyclops" by crew behind-the-scenes
- Momaw Nadon – Ithorian cantina patron often referred to as "Hammerhead"
- Wuher (Ted Burnett) – Corellian bartender who tells Luke "We don't serve their kind", referring to the droids C-3PO and R2-D2

==== Bounty Hunters ====
In The Empire Strikes Back, the Empire hires six bounty hunters to track down the Millennium Falcon.

- 4-LOM (Chris Parsons) – a reprogrammed protocol droid
- Bossk (Alan Harris) – a Trandoshan hunter (also seen in Jabba's Palace in Return of the Jedi)
- Dengar (Morris Bush) – a Corellian agent (also seen in Jabba's Palace in Return of the Jedi)
- Boba Fett (Jeremy Bulloch) – a Mandalorian who successfully tracks down the ship to Bespin, where he works with Vader and Imperial forces to capture Han Solo and the rest of the crew. He delivers Solo frozen in carbonite to gangster Jabba the Hutt for the bounty. Fett is later present at Jabba's Palace, where his jetpack is damaged during Luke Skywalker's rescue mission, and he is swallowed by the Sarlaac. In the extended editions, the character's voice was re-dubbed by Temuera Morrison, who portrayed the character's clone father Jango Fett in Attack of the Clones.
- IG-88 – an assassin droid
- Zuckuss (Cathy Munro) – a Gand tracker

==== Jabba the Hutt ====
Jabba is a Hutt gangster and crime lord on Tatooine. He is killed by Leia Organa in the mission to rescue Han Solo.

The character was originally portrayed as a human by actor Declan Mulholland in A New Hope, though his only scene was cut. His first proper appearance was in Return of the Jedi, depicted by a one-ton puppet operated by several puppeteers. The character is credited as himself, though he was voiced by Larry Ward.

Jabba's entourage at his Tatooine palace includes a variety of unique characters reminiscent of the Mos Eisley scene in the first movie:

- Salacious B. Crumb – a Kowakian Monkey-Lizard and court jester in Jabba's court, performed by Tim Rose and voiced by Mark Dodson
- Bib Fortuna (Michael Carter) – the Twi'lek majordomo and chief aide to Jabba
- Wam Lufba – Yuzzum exterminator
- Malakili (Paul Brooke, voice dubbed by Ernie Fosselius) – rancor handler
- Ephant Mon – Chevin mercenary
- Oola (Femi Taylor) – a Twi'lek dancer who is fed to Jabba's rancor
- The Max Rebo Band – an alien swing music band. Originally having three members (Max Rebo, Sy Snootles, Droopy McCool) in Return of the Jedi, the group's lineup was greatly expanded in the 1997 Special Edition.

== See also ==
- List of Star Wars prequel trilogy characters
- List of Star Wars sequel trilogy characters
