= I Am Your Father =

2015 film by Marcos Cabotá and Toni Bestard

- Directed by: Marcos Cabota and Toni Bestard
- Written by: Toni Bestard & Marcos Cabotá
- Produced by: Paula Serra
- Starring: David Prowse; Jeremy Bulloch
- Narrated by: Colm Meaney
- Cinematography: Nicolás Pinzón and Daniel Torrelló
- Edited by: Saúl Benejama
- Music by: Tolo Prats
- Production companies: IB3; Nova Televisió; Singular Audiovisual; Strange Friends
- Release date: 20 November 2015
- Running time: 82 minutes
- Country: Spain
- Languages: English, Spanish

I Am Your Father is a 2015 Spanish documentary film written and directed by Toni Bestard and Marcos Cabotá. The film deals with actor David Prowse many years after he played the role of Darth Vader in the original Star Wars trilogy.

== Synopsis ==
David Prowse is a bodybuilder and actor who famously portrayed the role of Darth Vader in Star Wars, The Empire Strikes Back, and Return of the Jedi. Unlike most of the other Star Wars stars, however, he is relatively obscure, since James Earl Jones dubbed Vader's voice and Sebastian Shaw portrayed an unmasked Vader (in Return of the Jedi). Prowse lived anonymously in Croydon, a suburb of London.

The story begins with a young filmmaker who travels to London to propose that Prowse reshoot the unmasking scene from Jedi, to prove that Prowse could have played Darth Vader. In a symbolic way, the directors, assisted by a group of enthusiastic fans, try to give Prowse the recognition he never had.

In this documentary, the directors find some clues about the difficult relationship between Prowse and Lucasfilm, suggesting that the reason for their differences was an article published by a British newspaper during the shooting of Return of the Jedi.

== Cast ==
- David Prowse, Actor / Darth Vader
- Kenny Baker, Actor / R2-D2
- Michael Atiyeh, colorist for Star Wars comics
- Marcus Hearn, author of The Cinema of George Lucas
- Gary Kurtz, producer of Star Wars and The Empire Strikes Back
- Brian Muir, Darth Vader helmet sculptor
- Robert Watts, Star Wars producer
- Jeremy Bulloch, Actor / Boba Fett
- Lou Ferrigno, Actor

== Production ==
The film was developed by production companies IB3, Nova Televisió, Singular Audiovisual, and Strange Friends.

== Release ==
I Am Your Father was originally released in Spain on 20 November 2015. The film was later released internationally through Netflix in September 2016. The film was also featured at the 47th International Film Festival of India in November 2016.
