= Return of the Ewok =

- Directed by: David Tomblin
- Written by: David Tomblin
- Produced by: David Tomblin
- Starring: Warwick Davis; Roy Kinnear; Robert Watts; Harrison Ford; Mark Hamill; Carrie Fisher; David Prowse; Anthony Daniels; Jeremy Bulloch; Frank Oz; Peter Mayhew; Tim Rose; David Tomblin
- Music by: John Williams; Supertramp
- Running time: 24 minutes
- Language: English

Return of the Ewok is an unreleased 1982 mockumentary short, written, produced and directed by David Tomblin, starring Warwick Davis as himself in a fictionalized account of how he got the role of Wicket W. Warrick in Return of the Jedi.

== Overview ==
The film was created during production of Return of the Jedi, on which Tomblin worked as first assistant director, and as second unit director, filming Ewok battle scenes. "The film is a curiosity, half-documentary about the making of Jedi, half-fairy tale about a little boy who becomes an Ewok. He thinks he's the only Ewok in the world, but eventually finds there are others," Tomblin said in a 1984 interview. One potential use of the film mooted at the time of filming was to use it as a promotional film for Return of the Jedi. However, post-production on Return of the Ewok was never completed, and it has never been officially released.

The film is set in both the "real world" and the fictional locations of the Star Wars universe. Real world locations include Chelsea Football Club's stadium Stamford Bridge, Heathrow Airport and Elstree Studios and the actors' dressing rooms there. Fictional locations include Dagobah, the second Death Star, Jabba's Palace, and Endor. Throughout the film, these two realities are intermixed to produce an alternate reality.

== Plot ==
Return of the Ewok focuses on the fictional account of Davis' decision to become an actor and act as Wicket in Return of the Jedi (notably, Davis refers to the film as Revenge of the Jedi, its temporary pre-release title). It also follows his transformation into Wicket. As Warwick and as Wicket, he visits and interacts with many of the cast and crew of the movie and then characters of the movie. As Warwick, he goes to Elstree Studios where he interacts with the cast, both in and out of character. At one point, he even interacts with Luke Skywalker as he jumps out of a movie screen. As Wicket, he goes to the Death Star to see Darth Vader, and is chased by Boba Fett, eventually meeting Yoda on Dagobah.

== Production ==
Filming took place during the production of Return of the Jedi, including at lunchtimes and on weekends. "At lunch times, I would rush around and try and shoot pieces for it," Tomblin said. George Lucas financed the film, though costs were limited to expenses such as film stock. "Everyone contributed their time and talent for absolutely nothing," Tomblin said.

== Cast ==
- Warwick Davis as himself / Wicket W. Warrick
- Roy Kinnear as the Talent Agent
- Robert Watts as Producer
- Harrison Ford as himself / Han Solo
- Mark Hamill as himself / Luke Skywalker
- Carrie Fisher as herself / Princess Leia Organa
- David Prowse as himself / Darth Vader
- Anthony Daniels as C-3PO
- Frank Oz as Yoda
- Peter Mayhew as Chewbacca
- Jeremy Bulloch as Boba Fett
- Tim Rose as Salacious Crumb

Players of Chelsea Football Club also make an appearance in the film, alongside Davis' mother, father, and sister; Ashley, Sue, and Kim. David Tomblin also appears as himself and provides the voices of Darth Vader and Boba Fett. Michele Gruska is heard as the voice of Sy Snootles with Deep Roy and Simon Williamson playing Droopy McCool and Max Rebo respectively. Amanda Noar appears as Jess, one of Jabba’s dancers, dancing to Lapti Nek alongside another dancing girl played by an unknown actress.

== Music ==
- "Star Wars" Theme Music - John Williams
- "Take the Long Way Home" - Supertramp

== Versions ==
=== Official ===
For many years, the only confirmed copy of Return of the Ewok was a video copy in Warwick Davis' own home entertainment center. This copy has been said by Davis to have been frequently shown to only close family, friends, and colleagues. Despite viewings of the film by those close to him, he had never shown the film publicly, and many fans had never even heard of it until 1996, when Davis mentioned it in an interview for the Star Wars Insider magazine. Davis publicly screened the film at the first Star Wars Celebration in 1999, and it was also screened at Celebration II in 2002 and Celebration III in 2005.

The original 16 mm print was said to be lost; according to Davis, his VHS copy is the only one in existence. However, a copy of the print, or even the original print, may actually reside in the Lucasfilm archives. Evidence of this was shown on the 2004 DVD release of the Star Wars Original Trilogy. A clip from the film of Wicket being chased by Boba Fett on the Death Star was included as part of the Easter egg of bloopers from the trilogy. It appeared in a widescreen format in good quality, suggesting that it had been preserved.

In April 2005, approximately four minutes of the film was made available on the official Star Wars website for members of Hyperspace, the official fan club, to download and view after the film was shown at Celebration III. Davis said at the convention that he loaned his VHS tape to Lucasfilm, who made a digital copy of it, and since it was the best known copy, that it was the source for the Hyperspace clip. The copy online at StarWars.com shows a minimal amount of cleanup, and the soundtrack has been altered in several places. Where the original film used Supertramp's "Take The Long Way Home", the online version substitutes incidental music to avoid copyright clearance issues. Dialogue has also been changed—in one example, Wicket's cry of "Crikey, it's Lord Vader!" near the end of the film has been excised.

Unlike its counterpart mockumentary, R2-D2: Beneath the Dome, Return of the Ewok has not yet been officially released on DVD or any other format. Davis has reportedly stated that a future release is "possible." In 2020, high quality footage from Return of the Ewok appears in Warwick & Son, a 6 minute documentary about Warwick Davis returning to play Wicket W. Warrick in 2019's Star Wars: The Rise of Skywalker. The documentary is featured as bonus content on home video releases of the film and on Disney +.

=== Bootlegs ===
In 2004, a recording of the entire film was put on eBay by someone who attended a screening, but the auction was pulled because the copy was reportedly given to the seller under strict agreement that it was not to be copied or sold. At least two people are alleged to have filmed it at Celebration II, but their copies have yet to surface. Although the film was also screened in the Pop Culture room at 2005's Celebration III, no illicit recordings have yet surfaced.

The highest-quality bootleg known of the entire film is a fan preservation project created in May 2005, a collaboration between fans Garrett Gilchrist and SKot Kirkwood. Their DVD version uses footage taken from the clip on StarWars.com combined with someone's camcorder recording of the film from one of its public showings, as well as clips culled from other sources, such as a brief excerpt that was shown on VH1. Gilchrist digitally cleaned up portions of the video and audio, then combined and edited the footage from different sources together to reconstruct the film. At 25 minutes, this version is slightly longer than the original, with Gilchrist adding his own opening and ending credits.

The first UK screening of the film was at The Elstree Studios Star Wars Day, Borehamwood, England on November 13, 1994. The second showing was at Empire Day 3 in Watford, England in 1996. A later showing was at the National Space Centre in Leicester for the Star Wars day convention on November 12, 2005. It was presented by Warwick Davis and also included a question-and-answer session afterward.

== Awards ==
- In 2005, the film won the Pioneer Award in the Lucasfilm sponsored Official Star Wars Fan Film Awards.
