= Night Traveler =

Multimedia adventure series

Night Traveler is a multimedia adventure series produced in the United States by Lunar Moth Entertainment. Originally intended as a single issue comic book, the series began to take shape in a larger more in-depth format. Consisting of ten multimedia episodes, the first season of the series, titled Prophecy of the Elder, follows musician Jake Whitman on a journey of discovery and adventure. After being fired from his only steady gig, Jake is lured down a dark dirt road by a ghostly apparition, causing him to wreck his motorcycle. Rescued by an elderly Native American, Jake is introduced to the origin of dreams, where four challenges will stand between destiny and destruction...

== Cast for Night Traveler: Prophecy of the Elder ==
- Roddy Piper as The Pyro Messiah
- Jeremy Bulloch as Sir Logan the Prowler
- Cindy Morgan as Emily S. Preston
- R.E. Asbury as Mingo Coyote and Mimic
- Bridget Asbury as Blackbird
- AJ Confessore as Jimmy Fines
- Jason Carle as Booga

== Multimedia format ==
Night Traveler: Prophecy of the Elder is a multimedia adventure series that combines various artistic mediums to tell its story. Bringing together such formats as comic book style art, sound design, interactive navigation and adventurous text, the series allows its viewers to experience a unique brand of storytelling and fantasy.
