= Counter-Attack (1960 serial) =

1960 British children's TV series

- Written by: Peter Ling
- Directed by: Charles Jarrott
- Starring: Jeremy Bulloch; Murray Yeo; Irene French
- Country of origin: United Kingdom
- Original language: English
- No. of series: 1
- No. of episodes: 7

Production
- Producer: Sydney Newman
- Running time: 25 Minutes
- Production company: ABC Weekend Television

Original release
- Network: ITV
- Release: 17 January – 28 February 1960

Counter-Attack is a British children's television series set during the Nazi occupation of the Channel Islands during the Second World War. The series was created by Sydney Newman and ABC Weekend Television for ITV and starred a young Jeremy Bulloch.

== Story ==
The series follows 3 children, Terry Benson, Cliff Delamere and his sister Carol as they try to create havoc for German Major Henrich Wolf and his batmam Kurt Lander who are billeted at the Delamere's shop, run by Cliff and Carol's older sister, Jean who has taken in Terry after his father, Tom has escaped to Britain to join up in the war against Nazi Germany.

== Production ==
The idea for the series came when Producer Sydney Newman had sent an image of an English-looking street featuring a German soldier asking for directions to writer Peter Ling. Ling began to research the history of the Channel Islands occupation and created the characters with help from children's consultant Mary Field. Charles Jarrott who was a director on episodes of Armchair Theatre, directed Counter-Attack.

== Cast ==
- Jeremy Bulloch as Terry Benson
- Murray Yeo as Cliff Delamere
- Irene French as Carol Delamere
- Etain O’Dell as Jean Delamere
- Leslie Sands as Tom Benson
- Joseph Fürst as Major Heinrich Wolf
- Bruno Barnabe as Mr Prout
- Oliver Neville as Hugh
- Scot Finch as Kurt Lander

== Episodes ==
| No. | Title | Directed by | Written by | Original release date |
|---|---|---|---|---|
| 1 | "White Flag" | Peter Ling | Charles Jarrott | January 17, 1960 |
| 2 | "Escape" | Peter Ling | Charles Jarrott | January 24, 1960 |
| 3 | "Sealed Orders" | Peter Ling | Charles Jarrott | January 31, 1960 |
| 4 | "Secret Agent" | Peter Ling | Charles Jarrott | February 7, 1960 |
| 5 | "Traitor's Mark" | Peter Ling | Charles Jarrott | February 14, 1960 |
| 6 | "Grand Duty" | Peter Ling | Charles Jarrott | February 21, 1960 |
| 7 | "Last Chance" | Peter Ling | Charles Jarrott | February 28, 1960 |

== DVD release ==
All episodes have been released individually as part of the ABC Nights in DVD's by Network but the series has not received a complete DVD release.

== See also ==
- Enemy at the Door, a WWII drama series set during the Nazi occupation of Guernsey, focusing on the lives of the islanders and German occupiers. The series was made by London Weekend Television and starred Alfred Burke, Bernard Horsfall and Simon Cadell.
