= Star Wars: The Interactive Video Board Game =

Board game and accompanying VHS video tape

Assault on the Death Star
- Cover graphics of the board game
- Manufacturers: Hasbro
- Actors: David Prowse
- Voice actors: James Earl Jones
- Publishers: Parker Brothers/Hasbro
- Publication: 1996; 30 years ago
- Genres: board game
- Languages: English
- Players: 3 to 6
- Playing time: 1 hour
- Chance: dice rolling
- Age range: 8+
- Media type: VHS tape and board game

Star Wars: The Interactive Video Board Game: Assault on the Death Star is a board game and accompanying VHS video tape, released by Parker Brothers in 1996. It is notable for including new scenes shot twenty years after the first Star Wars film, featuring Darth Vader walking down the halls of the original Death Star set, in a performance reprised by David Prowse, James Earl Jones, and director of photography Gilbert Taylor. The game led to the canonization of four new characters in the Star Wars universe.

== Plot ==
Following a failed attempt by the Rebel Alliance to destroy the second Death Star, Emperor Palpatine orders Darth Vader to take command of the newly reconstructed battlestation and move it to the forest moon of Endor to be completed in secret. Shortly thereafter, he learns of a major Rebel supply base on the planet D'rinba IV and diverts its course to the planet, intending to use the battlestation's superlaser to destroy it. Intercepting this information, the Alliance assembles a team of Force-sensitive individuals to sneak on board and disable the station. However, Vader soon learns of their presence and has the station put on alert. The situation becomes a race against time for the members of the infiltration party, as they must attempt to succeed in their mission while avoiding the station's stormtrooper contingent and, late in the mission, a party member's fall to the dark side of the Force.

== Gameplay ==
The game is intended for three to six players, is based on cards and dice, and requires the assembly of a few three-dimensional pieces. The movie plays continuously for one hour, during which the players utilize the board game, trying to reach their goal before the video ends. At various points during the video, Vader appears as an implicit warning to the players of what he is about to do. In the video, he wants to divert Death Star II to attempt to destroy another planet, while on its final destination to the forest moon of Endor so that its construction can be completed in secret.

== Production ==
The live-action video on the VHS tape was filmed in 1996 on an original Star Wars set, twenty years after the original film. For the new scenes, Hasbro cast the reprised roles of David Prowse as Vader's body actor and James Earl Jones as Vader's voice actor. Some of the crew from A New Hope returned to shoot the scenes, including director of photography Gilbert Taylor.

== Reception ==
Chris Bishop of Echo Station reviewed the game positively. He noted the good production value of the cinematic and game components, though at first glance finding the game to look intimidatingly complicated and bearing a lot of instructions. He noted that the story sacrificed some continuity with the movies, wherein the Death Star's superweapon would not yet be fully operational. He found that James Earl Jones's performance yielded an oddly softly spoken Darth Vader character.

=== Legacy ===
The game led to the canonization of four new characters in the Star Wars universe. This game's storyline was referenced in The Dark Forces Saga, a series of online adventure scenarios for the Star Wars RPG line published on the website of Wizards of the Coast. Written by Abel G. Peña, this series canonizes four of the VCR game's player characters as Kyle Katarn (from Star Wars: Dark Forces), Shira Brie (from the Marvel Comics Star Wars series), Corwin Shelvay and Erling Tredway (both from West End Games's Star Wars RPG material).
