= Angus MacInnes =

Canadian actor (1947–2024)

- MacInnes in Star Wars (1977)
- Born: 27 October 1947; Windsor, Ontario, Canada
- Died: 23 December 2024 (aged 77); Edinburgh, Scotland
- Education: University of Windsor; London Academy of Music and Dramatic Art
- Occupation: Actor
- Years active: 1975–2016

Angus MacInnes (27 October 1947 – 23 December 2024) was a Canadian actor. He appeared in over 80 film and television productions between 1975 and 2016, but was best known for his roles as Jon "Dutch" Vander (Gold Leader) in Star Wars, and as former hockey great Jean "Rosey" LaRose in the cult comedy Strange Brew.

== Early life ==
Of Scottish descent, MacInnes was born and raised in Windsor, Ontario, the son of John and Kate MacInnes. He graduated from the University of Windsor's drama program in 1971, after which he moved to England on a scholarship to the London Academy of Music and Dramatic Art, the first Canadian to ever be admitted.

== Career ==
MacInnes played supporting parts in a variety of British, Canadian, and American productions from the 1970s through the 2010s. He worked in repertory theatre before making his film debut in Rollerball (1975), playing the bodyguard of James Caan's character. MacInnes later credited the positive experience of working with director Norman Jewison with convincing him to pursue film acting full-time. He said in a 2010 interview, "I spent a lot of time on set simply watching and learning. In one sense it was like doing a post grad crash course in the techniques and subtleties of acting for the camera. I fell in love with film work, it’s technical demands and creative possibilities."

In 1977, MacInnes played arguably his best-known role, as Rebel pilot Jon "Dutch" Vander (Gold Leader) in the original Star Wars. He remained closely identified with the part throughout the rest of his career, and was a fixture at Star Wars Celebration conventions and other fan events. He reprised the part nearly 40 years later, through a mix of archive footage and newly recorded audio, in the Star Wars spin-off Rogue One (2016).

MacInnes reunited with his Star Wars co-star Harrison Ford in two other films, as a US Army officer in Force 10 From Navarone (1978) and a corrupt cop in Witness (1985).

His other notable roles included gangster seeking stolen cocaine in Atlantic City, former hockey great Jean "Rosey" LaRose in the comedy Strange Brew, a detective in Hellbound: Hellraiser II, a Judge in the comic book adaptation Judge Dredd, a gateman in Stanley Kubrick's Eyes Wide Shut, Sarge in Hellboy, a police captain in The Black Dahlia, and a Maersk Alabama crewman in Captain Phillips. He also appeared on the BBC Scotland soap River City as Sonny Munro. On the West End, MacInnes starred in The Glass Menagerie at the Cambridge Arts Theatre.

== Personal life ==
In addition to his acting career, MacInnes ran a pizzeria, Mamma's American Pizza, in Edinburgh. He had a wife, Katy, two children, and a granddaughter.

=== Death ===
MacInnes died on 23 December 2024, at the age of 77.

== Filmography ==
=== Film ===
Year	Title	Role	Notes
1975	Rollerball	Jonathan's Guard	Uncredited
1977	Star Wars	Jon "Dutch" Vander (Gold Leader)	
1978	Force 10 From Navarone	Lieutenant Doug Reynolds	
1980	Nothing Personal	Military Policeman	
1980	Atlantic City	Vinnie	
1980	Superman II	The Warden	
1981	Dirty Tricks	FBI Agent Jones	
1981	Outland	Hughes	
1982	If You Could See What I Hear	Policeman	
1982	Murder by Phone	Lab Guard	
1982	The Sender	Sheriff Prouty	
1983	Strange Brew	Jean LaRose	
1983	Spasms	Duncan Tyrone	
1984	Best Revenge	Wayne	
1985	Witness	Sgt. Leon "Fergie" Ferguson	
1986	Half Moon Street	Bill Rafferty	
1988	Hellbound: Hellraiser II	Detective Bronson	
1988	Honor Bound	Jessup	
1989	Gross Anatomy	Dean Torrence	
1990	The Krays	Palendri	
1992	Spies Inc.	Vic	
1995	Judge Dredd	Council Judge Gerald Silver	
1999	Eyes Wide Shut	Gateman	
1999	Operation Delta Force 4: Deep Fault	Professor Walter Hill	
2000	Rhythm & Blues	Bad Daddy	
2001	Enigma	Commander Hammerbeck	
2001	The 51st State	"Pudsey" Smith	
2002	Amen.	Tittman	
2004	Hellboy	Sergeant Whitman	
2005	The Jacket	Judge	
2006	The Black Dahlia	Captain John Tierney	Credited as 'Angus MacInnis'
2007	Flight of Fury	General Tom Barnes	
2007	Dach	Security Guard	
2013	Captain Phillips	Ian Waller	
2015	Elstree 1976	Himself	
2016	Rogue One: A Star Wars Story	Jon "Dutch" Vander (Gold Leader)	Archive footage with newly recorded audio

=== Television ===
Year	Title	Role	Notes
1977	Space: 1999	Jelto	Episode: "Devil's Planet" (2.22)
1980	The Littlest Hobo	A henchman	Episode: "Escape" (1.20)
1980	The Littlest Hobo	Tigh Ridley	Episode: "Carnival of Fear" (2.06)
1988	The New Statesman	Captain Hirsch	Episode: "Friends of St. James" (1.5)
1998	Space Island One	Lieutenant Commander Walter B. Shannon	25 episodes
2013	Vikings	Tostig	2 episodes
