= Jeremy Bulloch =

English actor (1945–2020)

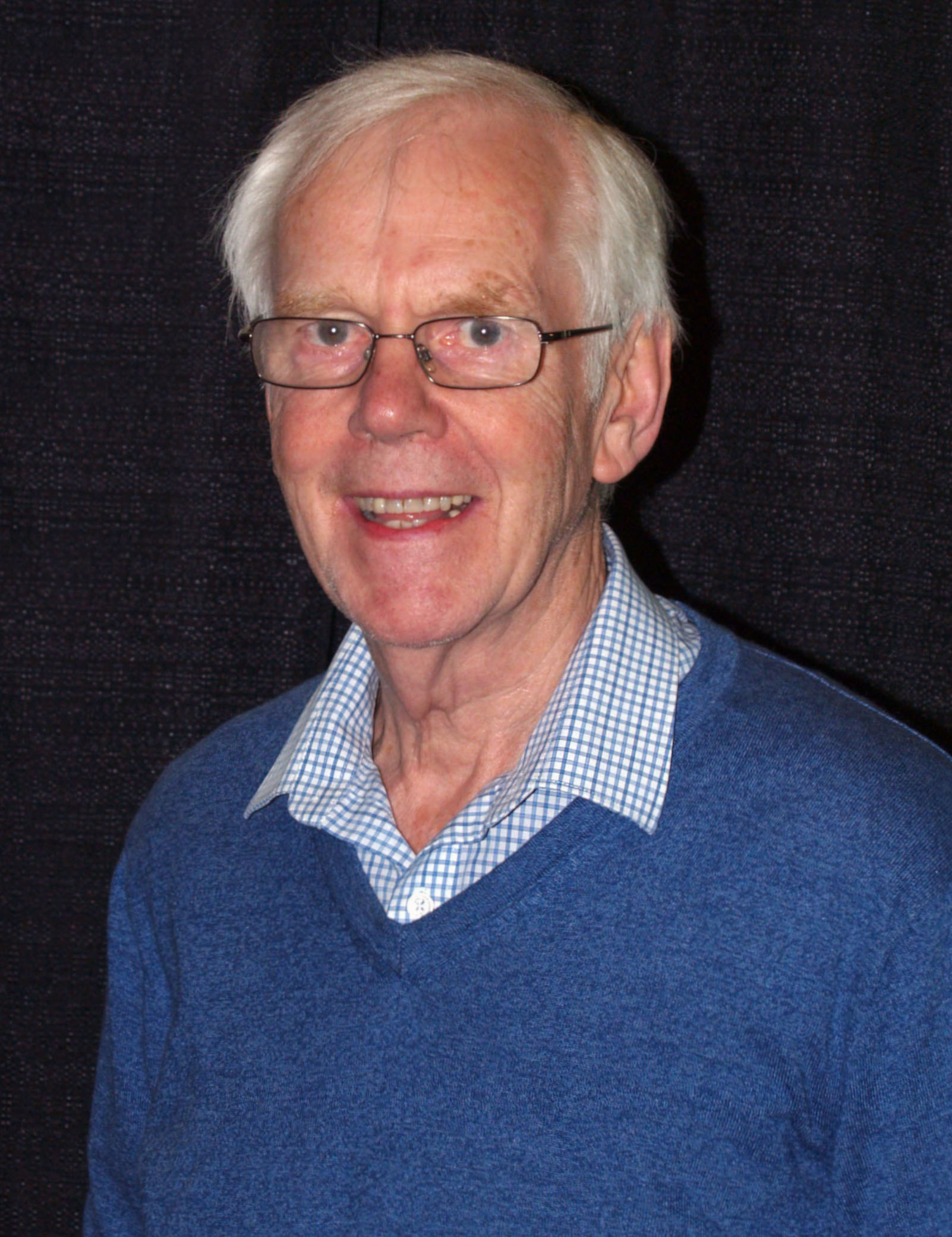
- Bulloch at the 2016 East Coast Comicon
- Born: Jeremy Andrew Bulloch; 16 February 1945; Market Harborough, Leicestershire, England
- Died: 17 December 2020 (aged 75); Tooting, London, England
- Occupation: Actor
- Years active: 1958–2018
- Spouse: Sandra Ford (m. 1965, divorced) Maureen Walker (m. 1970)
- Children: 3, including Jamie
- Relatives: Robert Watts (half brother)

Jeremy Andrew Bulloch (16 February 1945 – 17 December 2020) was an English actor. In a career that spanned six decades, he gained recognition for originating the physical portrayal of Boba Fett in the Star Wars franchise, appearing as the character in the films The Empire Strikes Back (1980) and Return of the Jedi (1983). Bulloch returned to the franchise for a cameo as Captain Colton in 2005's Revenge of the Sith.

== Early life ==
Bulloch was born in Market Harborough, Leicestershire, to Aziz "Diana" (née Meade) and McGregor Bulloch, an aeronautical engineer. He was the middle of three siblings, with three older half-brothers from his mother's earlier marriage. He attended St Leonard's School, Blandford Forum, Dorset, and Dorset House, Littlehampton, West Sussex, before training at the Corona Academy theatre school, London. From the age of five, he enjoyed acting and singing after a school show. He began acting at the age of ten and "appeared in [several] Disney films, British sitcoms and plays".

== Career ==
=== Early work ===
At the age of twelve, Bulloch's first professional appearance was in a breakfast cereal commercial. After several uncredited screen appearances, including that of a schoolboy in Carry On Teacher (1959), Bulloch's first regular role was in the 1960 TV series Counter-Attack and (the same year) The Chequered Flag. He went on to have a recurring role in Billy Bunter of Greyfriars School (1961) and a regular role in The Newcomers (1965–1967). At the age of seventeen, he portrayed Hamlet on stage.

In 1962, he appeared with Cliff Richard in the musical film Summer Holiday. He had a part in The Devil's Agent, which also starred Christopher Lee who later portrayed Count Dooku in the Star Wars Prequel Trilogy. He also appeared in two Doctor Who stories, The Space Museum (1965) and The Time Warrior (1973). Coincidentally, David Prowse and John Hollis, who both would later appear alongside Bulloch in The Empire Strikes Back, also appeared in a Jon Pertwee-era Doctor Who serial. In 1973, he appeared in the Malcolm McDowell comedy/musical O Lucky Man!. Other popular television series that Bulloch appeared in at this time included Man About the House, Crown Court, The Professionals and George and Mildred. From 1979 to 1981, he was a regular in the ITV sitcom Agony, in which he played Rob Illingworth, one half of a gay couple. His later television roles included a recurring role as Edward of Wickham in Robin of Sherwood (1984–86). He also had minor roles in three James Bond films; he played Andrews, a British submarine crewman, in The Spy Who Loved Me (1977), and twice played Smithers, an assistant to Q, in For Your Eyes Only (1981) and Octopussy (1983) respectively.

=== Star Wars ===
==== 1980–1983: Original trilogy ====
In a career spanning over half a century, Bulloch is best known for his role as Boba Fett in the Star Wars films The Empire Strikes Back and Return of the Jedi, despite the character's "minimal screen time." Toby Hadoke writes that "his precise body language and smouldering presence were ... integral to the character's appeal." The voice was provided by Jason Wingreen originally and in the updated versions by Temuera Morrison, to strengthen the connection with the Prequel Trilogy. (Note: Temuera Morrison portrayed Boba Fett's father, Jango in Attack of the Clones. Morrison and Bulloch both appeared in Revenge of the Sith. Morrison later portrayed Boba Fett in The Book of Boba Fett. Bulloch met both Morrison and Daniel Logan who portrayed young Boba Fett in Attack of the Clones.) In a 2008 interview for Star Wars Insider, Bulloch said he understood why it was done saying it was "so there is strong continuity between" the prequels and original trilogy.

Bulloch's half-brother, Robert Watts, who was working as an associate producer for Empire, was tasked with finding someone who "would fit in the costume of Boba Fett." So Watts called Bulloch (who at the time was working on Agony) and encouraged him to see Tiny Nicholls, the wardrobe supervisor and Bulloch had a costume fitting as Boba Fett, which "took 20 minutes to put on."

Additionally, he played a minor role as an Imperial officer (later identified as Lieutenant Sheckil), who grabs Leia when she warns Luke Skywalker of Vader's trap in The Empire Strikes Back. Bulloch was initially to do the scene as Fett when he fires at Skywalker on Cloud City, but with no one available to play the part, Bulloch went to the wardrobe and got changed into the "Imperial Officer's outfit". This was his only non-masked appearance in the original Star Wars films. John Morton, who portrayed the rebel pilot Dak Ralter (during the Battle of Hoth), covered Bulloch as a body double for Fett when the character confronts Vader in the Bespin hallway during Han Solo's torture.

Bulloch returned as Boba Fett for the fan film mockumentary: Return of the Ewok chasing Warwick Davis in his Wicket costume on the Death Star. He filmed his scenes for Jedi for four weeks. Bulloch was unaware of Fett's apparent demise prior to filming and was disappointed, since he would have liked to do more with his character. Bulloch said that portraying Fett was the most uncomfortable role he played and that putting on the jetpack "was very heavy." Fett's death in Return of the Jedi would later be retconned in the Disney+ series The Mandalorian, in which Bulloch had no involvement. (Note: The Season 2 finale included a dedication to Bulloch before the post-credits scene that revealed The Book of Boba Fett was coming in December 2021.)

While portraying Fett, Bulloch drew some inspiration from Clint Eastwood's the Man with No Name. Both Fett and Eastwood's character in A Fistful of Dollars wear similar capes, cradle their gun, ready to shoot and move in slow motion.

==== 2004–2015: Another Star Wars film and further involvement ====
In 2004, Bulloch published a limited edition memoir, Flying Solo, which is a humorous account of his personal and professional life, interspersed with tales from the convention circuit. In 2005, for the first time in 22 years, he once again made an appearance in a Star Wars film, Revenge of the Sith. In 2004, Bulloch received a phone call from Rick McCallum while on holiday with his family in Tuscany asking if he was available for a cameo as a pilot. This time he portrayed Captain Jeremoch (a portmanteau of Bulloch's name) Colton piloting Kenobi, Bail Organa and Yoda to Coruscant in an Alderaan Cruiser (later identified as the Sundered Heart and similar to the first vessel to appear in Star Wars). In a 2015 interview for Star Wars Insider, he said, "It was an honor to be called back, and to be part of the Star Wars saga again." Afterwards, Bulloch played a small cameo role in Star Wars fan films Order of the Sith: Vengeance and its sequel Downfall – Order of the Sith, alongside David Prowse and Michael Sheard. These fan films were made in England in support of Save the Children.

In an interview in 2013, he expressed an interest in being involved in a future Star Wars film in some way, saying, "The lovely thing is ... if I'm wearing a helmet, no one knows how old I am." He subsequently denied involvement in future projects. Although Boba Fett did not appear in Star Wars: The Force Awakens, Bulloch hinted that a film focusing on the origins of Boba Fett would be made. (Note: By October 2018 the film was no longer in production.) The Book of Boba Fett, a Disney+ television series taking place after the events of Return of the Jedi, premiered in 2021.

He was featured in the 2015 documentary Elstree 1976; a behind-the-scenes film, which focuses on the lives of some actors and extras who appeared in the Star Wars original trilogy. The documentary had a premiere at the BFI London Film Festival.

He was also featured in the 2021 Disney+ documentary special, Under The Helmet: The Legacy of Boba Fett which celebrates the origins and legacy of the character.

=== Other work ===
In 2004, Bulloch had a cameo in Mark Hamill's Comic Book: The Movie which also featured some Star Wars alumni such as David Prowse and Peter Mayhew. In 2005, he played the role of "Chairman Skellon" in a stage production of The Trial of Davros. In 2006, Bulloch provided the voice of Sir Logan the Prowler in the Night Traveler multimedia adventure series produced by Lunar Moth Entertainment.

In 2008, Richard LeParmentier, known for his portrayal of Admiral Motti in Star Wars, worked on Motti Now, a spoof of Apocalypse Now, featuring Bulloch and other Star Wars actors, including Kenneth Colley, Garrick Hagon and Jerome Blake.

== Personal life ==
Bulloch was married to Maureen Walker; the couple had two sons, Jamie and Robbie and lived in London. He had another son, Christian from a previous marriage. His half-brother was Robert Watts, who was a producer on The Empire Strikes Back, Return of the Jedi and the Indiana Jones films. Watts also had a cameo as Lieutenant Watts in Return of the Jedi. Robbie portrayed Matthew of Wickham in four episodes of Robin of Sherwood. The character is the son of Edward of Wickham portrayed by Bulloch. Another son is the translator Jamie Bulloch. His sister Sally Bulloch was a child actress before becoming an executive manager of the Athenaeum Hotel.

He once considered being a sportsman but ultimately chose to go into acting. Long before portraying Fett, Bulloch trained with David Prowse at his gym in South London. In his spare time, he enjoyed playing cricket and travelling. Bulloch said that he had been a fan of Star Trek ever since the original series. In an interview with Star Wars Insider, he said watching the first Star Wars film was "extraordinary. Something that would stay in the memory for a long time." He also watched the animated segment of the Star Wars Holiday Special which featured Boba Fett saying "It was nice to see the character."

Following the release of the Star Wars Special Edition trilogy, prequel trilogy and new films, Bulloch was frequently invited to science fiction conventions throughout the world, He attended London Film and Comic Con and several conventions as part of Star Wars Celebration.

Bulloch was inducted as an honorary member of the 501st Legion costuming organisation in May 2002. Later, in November 2009, he actually joined the 501st as a costume-wearing member making appearances with the group as Boba Fett (The Real Fett) BH 5211. Beginning in 2000, he was a frequent guest at the Star Wars Weekends (held annually at Disney's Hollywood Studios). In August 2018, Bulloch announced his retirement from attending conventions. In 2023, Maureen was inducted as a Friend of the 501st Legion.

== Death ==
Bulloch died of complications from Parkinson's disease (which he had lived with for several years) at St. George's Hospital in Tooting, London, on 17 December 2020, at the age of 75. Maureen survived him with their two sons, Christian from his previous marriage to Sandra Ford and ten grandchildren.

== Filmography ==
=== Film ===
Year	Title	Role	Notes	Ref.
1958	A Night to Remember	Boy jumping into water	Uncredited	
1959	Carry On Teacher	Schoolboy	Uncredited	
1959	The Cat Gang	Bill		
1960	A French Mistress	Baines		
1960	Caught in the Net	Bob Ketley		
1961	Spare the Rod	Angell		
1962	The Devil's Agent	Johnny Droste		
1962	Play It Cool	Joey		
1963	Summer Holiday	Edwin		
1965	The Dawn Killer	Colin Hawkes		
1966	The Idol	Lewis		
1969	Las Leandras	Robert Wilson		
1970	Hoffman	Tom Mitchell		
1970	The Virgin and the Gypsy	Leo		
1971	Mary, Queen of Scots	Andrew		
1973	O Lucky Man!	Young Man		
1974	Can You Keep It Up for a Week?	Gil		
1974	Only a Scream Away	Tom Manners		
1976	Escape from the Dark	Ginger		
1977	The Spy Who Loved Me	HMS Ranger Crewman		
1977	Night Ferry	Policeman (PC Martin)		
1978	King Richard the Second	Henry Percy		
1980	The Empire Strikes Back	Boba Fett / Sheckil	Voiced by Jason Wingreen	
1981	For Your Eyes Only	Smithers	Uncredited	
1982	Return of the Ewok	Boba Fett	Video short	
1982	The World Cup: A Captain's Tale	Ben Tillet Whittingham		
1983	Octopussy	Smithers		
1983	Return of the Jedi	Boba Fett	Voiced by Jason Wingreen	
1993	Swing Kids	Small club owner		
1996	Giving Tongue	Auctioneer		
1996	Princess in Love			
2003	Advanced Warriors	Max	Interactive movie	
2004	Comic Book: The Movie	Jeremy Bulloch	Video	
2004	Number One Longing, Number Two Regret	Fett		
2005	Star Wars: Episode III – Revenge of the Sith	Captain Colton	Cameo	
2006	Order of the Sith: Downfall	Commander Marucs	Short	
2006	Night Traveler	Sir Logan the Prowler	Voice	
2009	Turpin	Sir Guy	Short	
2015	Elstree 1976	Himself	Documentary	

=== Television ===
Year	Title	Role	Notes	Ref.
1960	Counter-Attack	Terry Benson	7 episodes	
1960	The Chequered Flag	Mike Brown	6 episodes	
1961	The Arthur Askey Show	Unknown	Episode: Pilbeam the Journalist	
1961	Billy Bunter of Greyfriars School	Bob Cherry	9 episodes, recurring role	
1965	Doctor Who: The Space Museum	Tor	3 episodes	
1965–1968	The Newcomers	Phillip Cooper	46 episodes	
1972	Crown Court	Dr Warner	3 episodes	
1972	Pathfinders	Ronnie Thompson	2 episodes	
1973	Doctor Who: The Time Warrior	Hal	4 episodes	
1974	Man About the House	Derek Sutton	1 episode: S3 E7 "Three of a Kind"	
1978	The Professionals	Denver	1 episode; S1 E6 Where the Jungle Ends	
1978	Leave it to Charlie	Boy	1 episode; S1 E4 How to Make Oscar Wilde	
1978	George and Mildred	Bill Allbright	1 episode	
1979–1981	Agony	Rob Illingworth	18 episodes	
1981	Only When I Laugh	Gary	1 episode; S3 E1 A Day in the Life Of	
1983–1985	Robin of Sherwood	Edward of Wickham	8 episodes	
1985	Chocky's Children	Landis	3 episodes	
1985	Full House	Bob	1 episode; S2 E1 Baby Talk	
1985	Jenny's War	Schroeder	TV movie	
1987	Boon	Inspector Gower	Episode; Fiddler Under the Roof	
1989	After Henry	George	Episode; Memory Games	
1989–1993	Casualty	Rodney Mulligan / Peter Cunningham	2 episodes	
1992–1996	The Bill	Dr Webster / Commander Bill Huxley	3 episodes	
1994	Faith	David Reckitt	TV mini-series, 4 episodes	
1995	Dangerfield	Superintendent Jacklin	Episode: Death in Custody	
1999	Aristocrats	Older George Napier	TV mini-series, 2 episodes	
2002	Spooks	Roger Welks	Also known as MI-5, Series 1, Episode 3	
2006–2008	Doctors	Julian Marker / Victor Hendon	2 episodes	
2008	Bonekickers	Masked man	Episode: Follow the Gleam	
2009	Law & Order: UK	Dickie	Episode: Honour Bound	
2009	Starhyke	Doctor Yul Striker	6 episodes	
2012	Russell Howard's Good News	Himself	1 Episode – Mystery Guest Segment	
2021	Under the Helmet: The Legacy of Boba Fett	Himself / Boba Fett	Disney Plus retrospective documentary	

== Bibliography ==
- McFarlane, Brian (2005). The Encyclopaedia of British Film (Paperback (2nd edition) ed.). London: Methuen. ISBN 9780413775269.
- Magazines, Titan (2021). Star Wars: The Empire Strikes Back: The 40th Anniversary Special Edition (Hardback ed.). London: Titan Magazines. ISBN 9781787734234.
- Magazines, Titan (2024). Star Wars Insider Presents The Mandalorian Collection (Hardback) (1st ed.). London: Titan Magazines. ISBN 9781787739994.
- Rinzler, J. W. (2010). The Making of Star Wars: The Empire Strikes Back (Hardback) (1st ed.). Aurum. ISBN 9781845135553.
- Wilkins, Jonathan, ed. (2016b). The Best of Star Wars Volume 2 (Paperback) (1st ed.). London: Titan. ISBN 9781785851179.
- Wilkins, Jonathan, ed. (2016). The Best of Star Wars Volume 4 (Paperback) (1st ed.). London: Titan. ISBN 9781785851902.
- Wilkins, Jonathan, ed. (2019). Star Wars: Aliens, Creatures and Droids (Paperback) (1st ed.). London: Titan. ISBN 9781785851964.
- Windham, Ryder; Wallace, Daniel; Hidalgo, Pablo (2011). Star Wars Year by Year Chronicle (Hardback ed.). London: Dorling Kindersley. ISBN 9781405392303.
