= Elstree 1976 =

- Theatrical release poster
- Directed by: Jon Spira
- Written by: Jon Spira
- Starring: David Prowse; Garrick Hagon; Jeremy Bulloch
- Cinematography: Sonny Malhotra
- Edited by: Jon Spira
- Music by: Jamie Hyatt
- Release dates: 9 October 2015 (London Film Festival); 6 May 2016 (United States)
- Running time: 90 minutes
- Country: United Kingdom
- Language: English
- Box office: $12,173 (US)

Elstree 1976 is a 2015 documentary film about the making of the 1977 film Star Wars and the legacy that it left behind.

== Cast ==
- Paul Blake
- Jeremy Bulloch
- Garrick Hagon
- Anthony Forrest
- David Prowse
- Angus MacInnes, who played Jon "Dutch" Vander (Gold Leader)
- Pam Rose
- Derek Lyons
- Laurie Goode
- John Chapman

== Production ==
The film was successfully funded via Kickstarter, grossing £42,191. The first trailer was released on 29 October 2015. It played at the BFI London Film Festival The premiere was attended by 400 people.

== Reception ==
The film received mixed reviews. Screen Daily said, "While the quirky outcome falls short of that ambition, it offers a slice of enjoyable nostalgia, capturing a sense of life as silly, surprising, regretful and all too fleeting." The Hollywood Reporter said, "for anyone expecting a definitive behind-the-scenes film about the making of Star Wars, this is not the documentary you have been looking for." The Village Voice said, "The most interesting part of Elstree 1976 comes when these actors express ambivalence about their odd celebrity." The review aggregator website Rotten Tomatoes reports that 81% of critics gave the film a positive rating, based on 27 reviews, with an average score of 6.37/10.
