= Kevin Moore (footballer, born 1957) =

English footballer

Personal information
- Date of birth: 20 October 1957 (age 69)
- Place of birth: England
- Position: Midfielder

Youth career
- –1974: Shrewsbury Town

Senior career*
Years	Team	Apps	(Gls)
1974–1978	Shrewsbury Town	18	(1)
–	Telford United	?	(?)
- * Club domestic league appearances and goals

Kevin Moore (born 20 October 1957) is an English former professional association football who played as a midfielder. Moore made 18 appearances in the Football League for Shrewsbury Town between 1974 and 1978, and also played non-league football for Telford United.
