= Kevin Moore (art historian) =

American art historian

Kevin Moore (born 1964) is an independent art historian and curator. His work focuses on the history of photography and contemporary art. Moore earned a Ph.D. in art history in 2002 from Princeton University and has worked in curatorial departments at the Metropolitan Museum of Art and the Fogg Art Museum, Harvard University.

Moore has collaborated with numerous institutions, including the Cincinnati Art Museum; the Princeton University Art Museum; the de Young Museum, San Francisco; the Centre Pompidou, Paris; and the Hayward Gallery, London.

He has lectured at: Princeton University; the Metropolitan Museum of Art, New York; The Frick Collection, New York; Parsons The New School for Design, New York; Musée d'Orsay, Paris; Université de Paris, Diderot; and l'Ecole des Hautes Etudes en Sciences Sociales, Paris.

He has appeared in two documentaries on photography produced by the BBC.

== Books (author) ==
- (2012) Real to Real: Photographs from the Traina Collection. Fine Arts Museums of San Francisco. ISBN 9780884011347
- (2012) Jacques Henri Lartigue: L'invention d'un artiste. Editions Textuel. ISBN 9782845974494
- (2010) Starburst: Color Photography in America 1970-1980. Hatje Cantz. ISBN 9783775724906
- (2004) Jacques Henri Lartigue: The Invention of an Artist. Princeton University Press. ISBN 0691120021

== Books (contributing author) ==
- (2013) Elena Dorfman: Empire Falling. Damiani. ISBN 9788862082662
- (2012) Robert Heinecken. Ridinghouse. ISBN 9781905464470
- (2012) Histoire de l'art du XIXe siècle (1848-1914). Ecole du Louvre. OCLC 812210598
- (2011) From Diversion to Subversion: Games, Play, and Twentieth-Century Art. Penn State Press. ISBN 9780271037035
- (2009) Words Without Pictures. LACMA/Aperture. ISBN 9781597111423
- (2008) More Than One: Photographs in Sequence. Yale University Press. ISBN 9780300149302
- (2008) American Paintings at Harvard, Volume Two. Harvard Art Museum/Yale University Press. ISBN 9781891771491
- (2007) New York Rises: Photographs by Eugene de Salignac. Aperture. ISBN 9781597110136
- (2007) L'Art de la photographie: 1839 à nos jours. Citadelles. ISBN 9782850884405
- (2005) The Oxford Companion to the Photograph. Oxford University Press. ISBN 9780198662716
- (2003) Lartigue: L'album d'une vie. Centre Pompidou/Seuil. ISBN 2020605112
