= Kevin Moore (Australian rules footballer) =

Australian rules footballer

Personal information
- Full name: Kevin Moore
- Born: 6 February 1954 (age 72)
- Original team: Glenhuntly
- Height: 181 cm (5 ft 11 in)
- Weight: 82 kg (181 lb)

Playing career^{1}
Years	Club	Games (Goals)
1974	Melbourne	8 (1)
- ^{1} Playing statistics correct to the end of 1974.

Kevin Moore (born 6 February 1954) is a former Australian rules footballer who played for Melbourne in the Victorian Football League (VFL).
