= Garrick Hagon =

British-Canadian actor (born 1939)

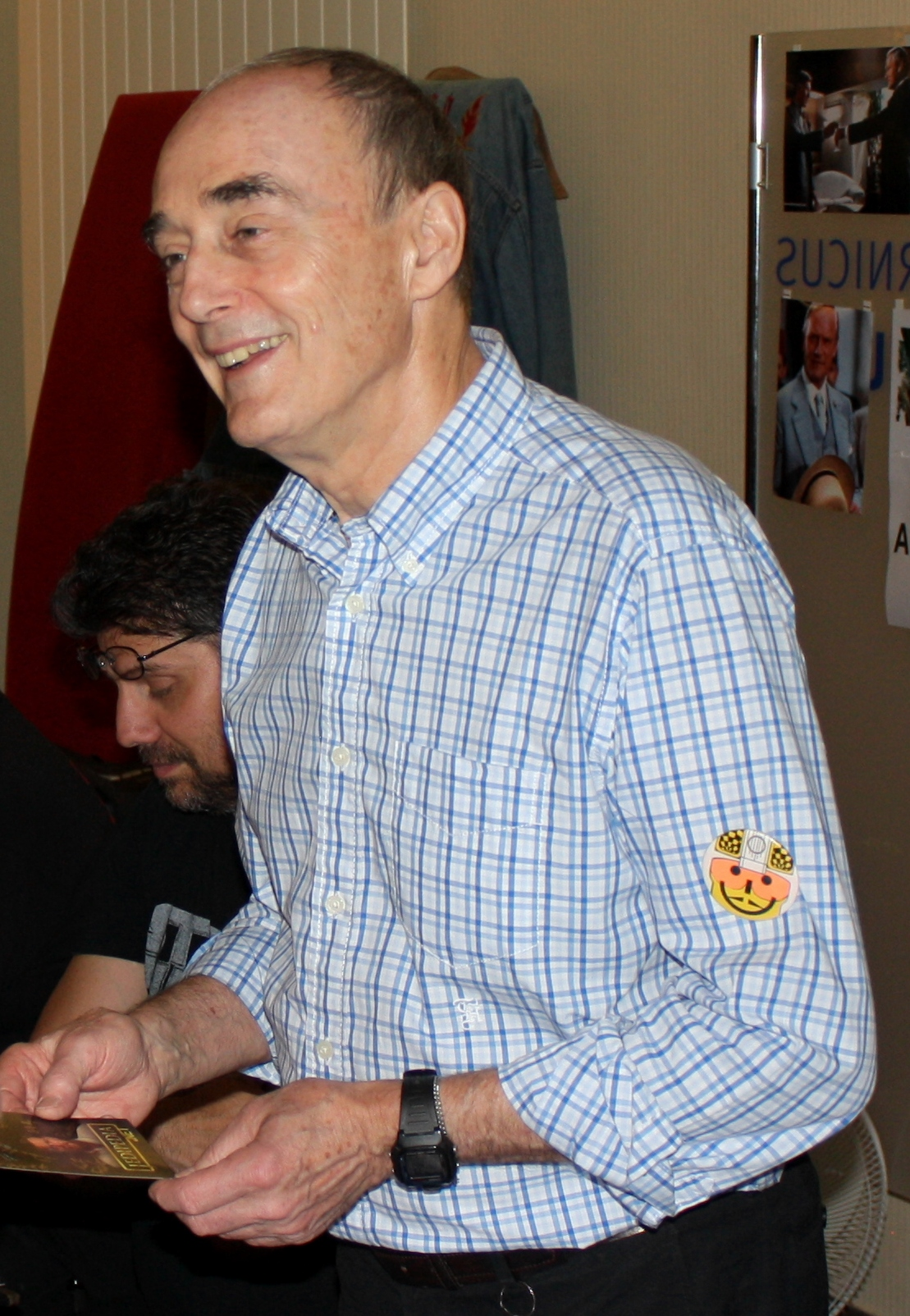
- Hagon in 2011
- Born: 27 September 1939 (age 87); London, England
- Citizenship: Canada
- Occupation: Actor
- Years active: 1953–present
- Website: garrickhagon.com

Garrick Hagon (/ˈheɪɡən/; born 27 September 1939) is a British-Canadian actor. He is known for his role as Biggs Darklighter in Star Wars: A New Hope. His films include Batman, Spy Game, Me and Orson Welles and The Message. He was the rebel leader Ky in the Doctor Who serial The Mutants, and played Simon Gerrard, Debbie Aldridge's husband in the BBC's The Archers.

== Early life and career ==
Hagon was born on 27 September 1939, in London and raised in Toronto, Ontario, Canada, where he attended UTS and Trinity College (Hon. English, 1963). He acted with Alec Guinness in Richard III at the Stratford Festival, where he played for seven seasons and won the Tyrone Guthrie Award in 1963. He guest-starred (as Johnnie Nipick) in the episode The River in the CBC television series The Forest Rangers in 1964. After studying for a spell with the Royal Court Theatre Studio in London, Hagon then acted with Prospect Productions, in many repertory theatres, in the West End in Arthur Miller's All My Sons (as Chris Kellar) and at the Royal National Theatre in After The Fall.

As a voice actor, he has been heard in many films and television series, including the UK dub of Star Fleet/X-Bomber (as Capt. Carter), the Manga Entertainment U.K. dubbed versions of the Lupin III films, The Secret of Mamo and Goodbye Lady Liberty, and in Akira Kurosawa's Ran. His voice is featured in the video game, Divinity II: Ego Draconis and he has recorded over 150 audiobooks for major UK publishers. Hagon has also directed over 100 audiobook recordings, including Michelle Paver's Wolf Brother read by Ian McKellen, and His Dark Materials by Philip Pullman.

In the original version of Star Wars: A New Hope, Hagon's role as Biggs Darklighter, Red 3, came to an early but heroic end in the attack on the Death Star in the film's climactic battle scene. In the 2011 Blu-ray release of the Star Wars films, Biggs's establishing scene at Anchorhead on Tatooine can be seen in full along with the characters of Fixer and Camie, played by Anthony Forrest and Koo Stark, respectively. Because of his performance as Biggs, Hagon has been invited to several sci-fi conventions and inducted into "Rebel Legions" and "501st Garrisons" - two Star Wars fandom groups - around the world.

Hagon's film roles include: Dad in Tim Burton's Batman, Ammar in Moustapha Akkad's The Message, CIA Director Wilson in Tony Scott's Spy Game, Dr. Mewling in Richard Linklater's Me and Orson Welles, Fr. Loughton in Xie Jin's The Opium War, Lt. Rafferty in Richard Attenborough's A Bridge Too Far, the British General in Paul Verhoeven's Black Book, Eros in Charlton Heston's Antony and Cleopatra, Jack Ives in Michael Pressman's Some Kind of Hero, and the American doctor in Olivier Dahan's La Vie en rose. In 2006, he appeared in an episode of The Line of Beauty.

In 2012, Hagon appeared in Doctor Who series 7 episode 3, "A Town Called Mercy". He also appeared in the video game Batman: Arkham Knight as Henry Adams.

== Filmography ==
=== Film ===
| Year | Title | Role | Notes |
|---|---|---|---|
| 1972 | Antony and Cleopatra | Eros | |
| 1976 | The Message | Ammar | |
| 1977 | Twilight's Last Gleaming | Driver Alfie | |
| 1977 | Star Wars Episode IV: A New Hope | Biggs Darklighter (Red Three) | |
| 1977 | A Bridge Too Far | Lieutenant Rafferty | |
| 1977 | The Spy Who Loved Me | USS Wayne Crewman | |
| 1979 | Winterspelt | Lieutenant Evans | |
| 1979 | Julius Caesar | Octavius Caesar | Television film |
| 1984 | A Talent for Murder | Mark Harrison | Television film |
| 1985 | Lace II | Accountant | Television film |
| 1986 | The Last Days of Patton | Lt. Col. Walter Kerwin | Television film |
| 1987 | Tomorrow's a Killer | Chambers | |
| 1987 | Nowhere to Hide | William Devlin | |
| 1987 | Rolling Vengeance | Vic's Lawyer | |
| 1987 | Cry Freedom | McElrea | |
| 1989 | Batman | Tourist Dad | |
| 1990 | The Rift | Barton | |
| 1991 | Sebastian Star Bear: First Mission | Additional voices | English dub |
| 1994 | Fatherland | Elliot | |
| 1995 | Lupin the 3rd: The Mystery of Mamo | Goemon Ishikawa XIII | Voice; English dub |
| 1995 | Balto | Telegraph Operator | Voice |
| 1996 | Mission Impossible | CNN Reporter | |
| 1996 | Bye Bye, Lady Liberty Lupin the 3rd: Goodbye Lady Liberty | Goemon Ishikawa XIII | Voice; English dub |
| 1997 | The Opium War | Missionary | |
| 2001 | Spy Game | CIA Director Wilson | |
| 2002 | The Magnificent Ambersons | Tom Kinney | Television film |
| 2004 | In My Country | Pilot | |
| 2005 | The Jacket | Defense Lawyer | |
| 2005 | Charlie and the Chocolate Factory | Denver Reporter | |
| 2007 | The Walker | Mungo Tenant | |
| 2008 | Me and Orson Welles | Dr. Mewling | |
| 2008 | Is Anybody There? | Douglas | |
| 2009 | Into the Storm | Harry Hopkins | |
| 2009 | Ninja | Professor Garrison | |
| 2012 | Red Lights | Howard McColm | |
| 2012 | Erased | James Halgate III | |
| 2013 | RED 2 | Davis | |
| 2015 | Elstree 1976 | Himself | |
| 2017 | The Current War | Attorney General | |
| 2020 | The Haunting of Margam Castle | Dean Michaels | |

=== Television ===
| Year | Title | Role | Notes |
|---|---|---|---|
| 1972 | Doctor Who | Ky | 6 episodes (The Mutants serial) |
| 1972–73 | The Adventurer | Gavin Jones | 10 episodes |
| 1973 | Moonbase 3 | Bruno Ponti | 3 episodes |
| 1973 | Thriller | Peter | Episode: "The Colour of Blood" |
| 1974 | Colditz | Lt. Jim Phipps | 2 episodes |
| 1975–76 | Couples | Gary | 9 episodes |
| 1976 | Z-Cars | Clown | Episode: "Kidnap" |
| 1978 | Return of the Saint | Abdul Hakim | Episode: "One Black September" |
| 1978 | Lillie | Bury Dasent | Miniseries |
| 1980 | Armchair Thriller | Walters | 3 episodes |
| 1980 | Oppenheimer | Frank Oppenheimer | Miniseries |
| 1983 | Philip Marlowe, Private Eye | Denny | Episode: "Smart Aleck Kill" |
| 1987 | A Perfect Spy | Grant Lederer | Miniseries |
| 1988 | War and Remembrance | Sam Jones | Miniseries |
| 1990–91 | Moomin | Hemulen | 77 episodes |
| 1992 | Love Hurts | Jeff Saganski | 2 episodes |
| 1992 | Tropical Heat | Stevens | Episode: "Twice as Dead" |
| 1993 | The Chief | OIM Bergholtz | Episode: "A Long Cold Lonely Winter" |
| 1994 | Scarlett | Samuel | Miniseries |
| 1994 | Tokyo Babylon | Shinji Nagumo | English dub |
| 1996 | Dalziel and Pascoe | Mr. Bergmann | Episode: "An Autumn Shroud" |
| 2001 | Legend of the Dragon Kings | Kengo Takabayashi | Voice |
| 2003 | Cambridge Spies | Klaus Fuchs | Miniseries |
| 2005 | The Inspector Lynley Mysteries | Joseph Frady | Episode: "The Seed of Cunning" |
| 2006 | The Line of Beauty | Morden Lipscome | Miniseries |
| 2006 | The Eagle | Canino | 2 episodes |
| 2012 | Doctor Who | Abraham | Episode: "A Town Called Mercy" |
| 2015 | Wallander | Steven Wilson | Episode: "The Troubled Man" |
| 2016 | The Crown | John Foster Dulles | Episode: "Scientia Potentia Est" |
| 2017–19 | The Amazing World of Gumball | Mayor of Elmore/Bernie (voice role), Superintendent Evil (live-action role) | 5 episodes |

=== Video game ===
| Year | Title | Role | Notes |
|---|---|---|---|
| 2001 | Desperados: Wanted Dead or Alive | Doc McCoy | |
| 2005 | Pac-Man World 3 | Ancient Hero | |
| 2011 | Operation Flashpoint: Red River | Additional Voices | |
| 2014 | Randal's Monday | Bum | |
| 2015 | Batman: Arkham Knight | Henry Adams | |
| 2016 | Deponia Doomsday | Vincent | |
| 2017 | Augmented Empire | Hartman | |
| 2017 | Horizon Zero Dawn | Kaeluf/Kindiv | |
| 2018 | Pillars of Eternity II: Deadfire | Enoi/High Priest Kasu | |

== Theatre credits ==
| Year | Title | Role | Venue |
|---|---|---|---|
| 1953 | Richard III | Edward, Prince of Wales | Stratford Festival, Stratford, Ontario |
| 1959 | Othello | Officer to Othello | Stratford Festival, Stratford, Ontario |
| 1960 | King John | Messenger/French Herald | Stratford Festival, Stratford, Ontario |
| 1961 | Love's Labour's Lost | Marcadé | Stratford Festival, Stratford, Ontario |
| 1961 | King Henry VIII | Messenger/Attendant to Wolsey | Stratford Festival, Stratford, Ontario |
| 1961 | Coriolanus | Roman Citizen | Stratford Festival, Stratford, Ontario |
| 1962 | The Taming of the Shrew | Lucentio | Stratford Festival, Stratford, Ontario |
| 1963 | Troilus and Cressida | Patroclus | Stratford Festival, Stratford, Ontario |
| 1963 | Timon of Athens | Caphis | Stratford Festival, Stratford, Ontario |
| 1964 | Richard II | Green | Stratford Festival, Stratford, Ontario |
| 1964 | Love's Labour's Lost | Marcadé | Stratford Festival, Stratford, Ontario |
| 1964 | Timon of Athens | Caphis | Stratford Festival, Stratford, Ontario |
| 1964 | King Lear | Curan | Stratford Festival, Stratford, Ontario |
| 1977 | Macbeth | | Derby Playhouse, Derby |
| 1979 | The Glass Menagerie | Tom Wingfield | Watford Palace Theatre, Watford |
| 1981 | All My Sons | Chris Keller | Wyndham's Theatre, London |
| 1983 | Love's Labour's Lost | Ferdinand | Stratford Festival, Stratford, Ontario |
| 1983 | Much Ado About Nothing | Don John | Stratford Festival, Stratford, Ontario |
| 1986 | Fifth of July | Kenneth Talley Jr. | Bristol Old Vic, Bristol |
| 1990 | After the Fall | Dan | Royal National Theatre, London |
| 1992 | Life of the World to Come | Jay Snyder | Almeida Theatre, London |
| 1993 | The Little Foxes | Horace Giddens | Nuffield Theatre, Southampton |
| 1994 | The Dream Coast | Wilson | White Bear Theatre, London |
| 1997 | Macbeth | Ross | Bristol Old Vic, Bristol |
| 1999 | I Am Yours | Raymond | Royal Court Theatre, London |
