= The Moore Show =

- Genre: Talk show
- Created by: Kevin Moore
- Directed by: Alex Brent (April 2011-March 2012) James Bainbridge (May 2012-present)
- Presented by: Kevin Moore
- Theme music composer: Rob Deere
- Composer: Nathan Palmer
- Country of origin: United Kingdom
- Original language: English
- No. of seasons: 1
- No. of episodes: 30

Production
- Executive producer: Joanna Soh
- Producers: Kevin Moore; Joanna Soh
- Production locations: ATRiuM Studios; Cardiff, UK
- Editors: Steven Hamer; Jonathan Davies
- Camera setup: Multiple
- Running time: 45 minutes
- Production company: Rohani Enterprise Ltd

Original release
- Network: Showcase TV (Sky UK 192, Freesat 402) & Seven
- Release: 10 June 2011

The Moore Show is a British television talk show presented by Kevin Moore and produced by Joanna Soh. The show began filming in April 2011 under the name of The Moore Show - Prime Time and went on to air on Sky Television on 10 June 2011. Covering a range of topics including the paranormal, self-help and celebrity chat with many of the shows interviews focusing on spiritual subject matters. Notable names which have been on the show include British astronomer Patrick Moore, Coronation Street actor William Roache, Star Wars actor David Prowse and psychic medium, Colin Fry. Before airing the show gained notoriety in the press for being totally produced by students of The University of Glamorgan where the show is filmed at the university's Atrium campus. In October 2011 Rohani Productions Ltd started work on a second show (The Moore Show Real Life Inspiration). The Moore Show re-branded itself in May 2013 as a Radio onTV show under the new name The Moore Show – Alternative Late Night Talk.

== Background ==
The Moore Show started as a late night radio talk show on The University of Glamorgan's Atrium Campus Atrium (Cardiff) student radio station Tequila Radio in October 2008. The radio show expanded to over thirteen FM stations across the UK as a pre-recorded show. The radio show (The Moore Show Late Night Talk) plans to go live across multiple FM stations in mid-2013.
