= Robert Watts =

British film producer (1938–2024)

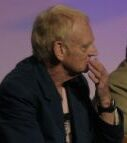
- Watts in 2007
- Born: 23 May 1938; London, England
- Died: 30 September 2024 (aged 86); East Sussex, England
- Occupation: Film producer
- Years active: 1968–1996
- Relatives: Jeremy Bulloch (half brother); Jamie Bulloch (half nephew)

Robert Watts (23 May 1938 – 30 September 2024) was a British film producer who was best known for his involvement with the Star Wars and Indiana Jones film series.

== Career ==
Watts began working in the film industry in 1960, after two years' National Service. His first film work was as a runner on the Boulting brothers production A French Mistress. Watts earned his union membership during two years as a runner, and later production manager, at a company based at England's Shepperton Studios which made TV commercials and documentaries. He then returned to feature films as a second assistant director on the film Man in the Middle.

During the 1960s, Watts worked extensively as a production manager and location manager, including on Darling (1965) starring Julie Christie and Dirk Bogarde, the 1967 James Bond film You Only Live Twice and Kubrick's 2001: A Space Odyssey (1968).

Watts was employed by producer Gary Kurtz as production supervisor on Star Wars. He had met Kurtz several years earlier in Los Angeles. Watts then enjoyed a long collaboration with George Lucas and Lucasfilm, working as associate producer on The Empire Strikes Back and co-producer on Return of the Jedi; and as associate producer on Raiders of the Lost Ark and producer on Indiana Jones and the Temple of Doom and Indiana Jones and the Last Crusade. He also worked on other Steven Spielberg-presented productions, including as producer on Who Framed Roger Rabbit and An American Tail: Fievel Goes West, and with Spielberg's long-term producer Frank Marshall on Marshall's second feature as director, Alive.

== Personal life and death ==
Watts was born in London on 23 May 1938. His half brother was Jeremy Bulloch, who played Boba Fett in the original Star Wars trilogy.

Watts died at his home in East Sussex, on 30 September 2024, at the age of 86, from natural causes.

== Filmography ==
Year	Film	Producer	Production manager	Roles
1968	2001: A Space Odyssey	No	Yes	
1970	El Condor	No	Yes	
1973	Papillon	No	Yes	
1977	Star Wars	No	Yes	
1980	The Empire Strikes Back	Associate	No	
1981	Raiders of the Lost Ark	Associate	No	
1983	Return of the Jedi	Co-Producer	No	Lt. Watts (AT-ST Driver) (uncredited)
1984	Indiana Jones and the Temple of Doom	Yes	No	
1988	Who Framed Roger Rabbit	Yes	No	
1989	Indiana Jones and the Last Crusade	Yes	No	
1991	An American Tail: Fievel Goes West	Yes	No	Additional Voices
1993	Alive	Yes	No	
1994	On Deadly Ground	Executive	No	
