= Peter Mayhew =

British-American actor (1944–2019)

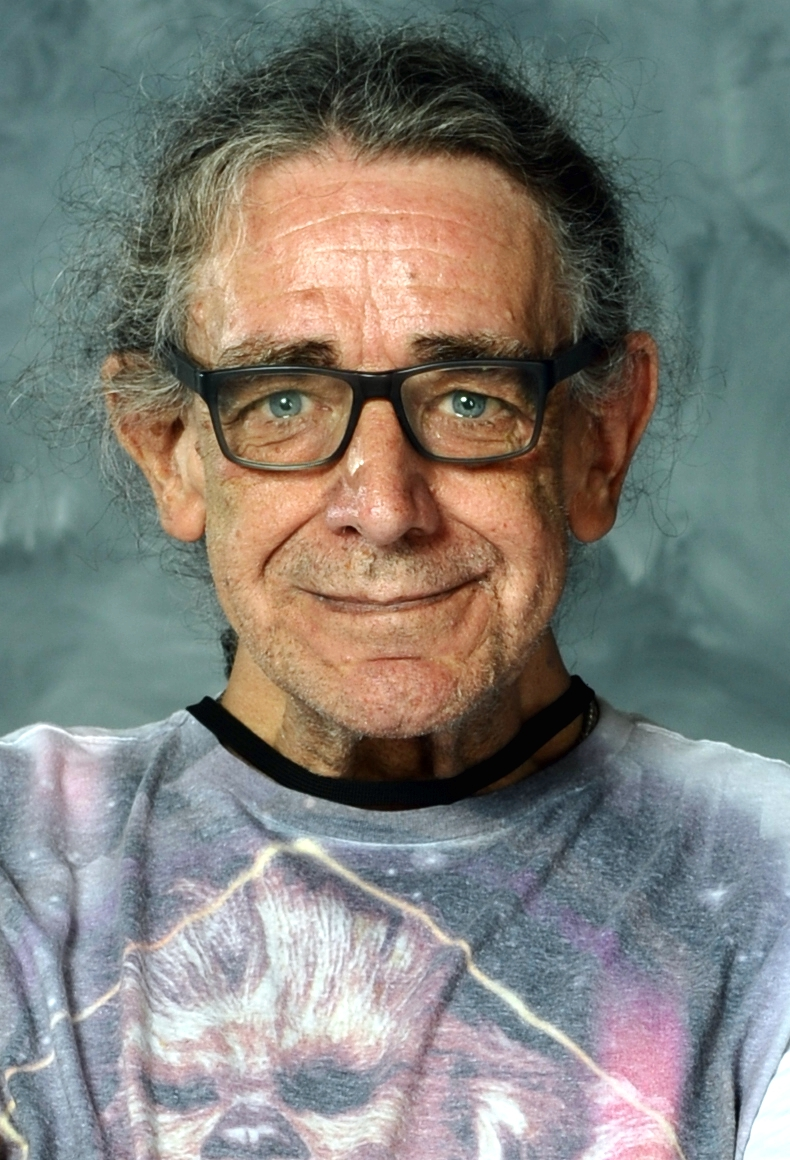
- Mayhew at the 2015 Florida Supercon
- Born: Peter William Mayhew; 19 May 1944; Barnes, Surrey, England
- Died: 30 April 2019 (aged 74); Boyd, Texas, US
- Resting place: Azleland Memorial Park and Mausoleum Reno, Texas, US
- Occupation: Actor
- Years active: 1976–2016
- Known for: Playing Chewbacca in the Star Wars franchise
- Height: 7 ft 3 in (221 cm)
- Spouse: Mary Cigainero (m. 1999)

Peter William Mayhew (19 May 1944 – 30 April 2019) was a British-American actor. He was best known for portraying Chewbacca in the Star Wars film series. He played the character in all of his live-action appearances from the 1977 original to 2015's The Force Awakens before his retirement from the role. He also voiced the character in Star Wars: The Clone Wars and portrayed him in some non-canon television shows, including The Muppet Show.

== Early life ==
Peter Mayhew was born on 19 May 1944, in Barnes, Surrey. At the age of 8, he was diagnosed with gigantism. Mayhew is often erroneously reported as having a genetic tissue disorder called Marfan syndrome; however, his family has clarified that Mayhew suffered from pituitary gigantism. His peak height was 7 feet 3 inches (2.21 m).

== Career ==
=== Early work ===
Mayhew gained his first acting job when the producers of Sinbad and the Eye of the Tiger (1977) discovered him from a photograph in a newspaper article about men with large feet, and cast him in the role of the Minoton.

=== Star Wars ===
==== 1977–1983: Star Wars original trilogy ====
Mayhew played Chewbacca in five Star Wars films of the Skywalker saga: the original trilogy (Star Wars, The Empire Strikes Back and Return of the Jedi), Star Wars: Episode III – Revenge of the Sith and Star Wars: The Force Awakens.

When casting the original Star Wars (1977), director George Lucas needed a tall actor who could fit the role of the hairy alien Chewbacca. He originally had in mind 6-foot-6-inch (1.98 m) bodybuilder David Prowse, but Prowse chose to play Darth Vader. This led Lucas to cast Mayhew, who was working as a hospital orderly in the emergency department at Mayday University Hospital in Surrey. He became aware of a casting call for Star Wars which was filming at Elstree Studios in Hertfordshire. Mayhew decided to visit Lucas to find out more about the role. He said, "George came into the office, and at that time I'd been sitting down on a chair, so I stood up and his eyes almost popped out of his head". Afterwards Mayhew had a costume fitting. The 7-foot-3-inch (2.21 m) tall actor was immediately cast as Chewbacca after he stood up to greet Lucas. In a 2011 interview for Star Wars Insider, Mayhew said he first walked onto the Docking Bay 94 set at Elstree Studios which featured Harrison Ford, several extras and Declan Mullholland as a human Jabba the Hutt. Mayhew continued working as an orderly at the same hospital in between filming the original Star Wars trilogy. The success and cultural impact of Star Wars led to further sequels rounding out the original trilogy, two more trilogies and television shows which continued Mayhew's association with his character and the franchise for the next decades.

Mayhew modelled his performance of Chewbacca after researching the behaviour of bears, monkeys and gorillas he saw at London Zoo. Lucas said Mayhew was "the closest any human being could be to a Wookiee: big heart, gentle nature and I learnt to always let him win". In the final edit of the films, the character did not have any lines; the sounds Chewbacca made being derived from sound recordings of animal noises, which were combined and overdubbed over placeholder lines which Mayhew had spoken to assist Ford and other actors sharing his scenes.

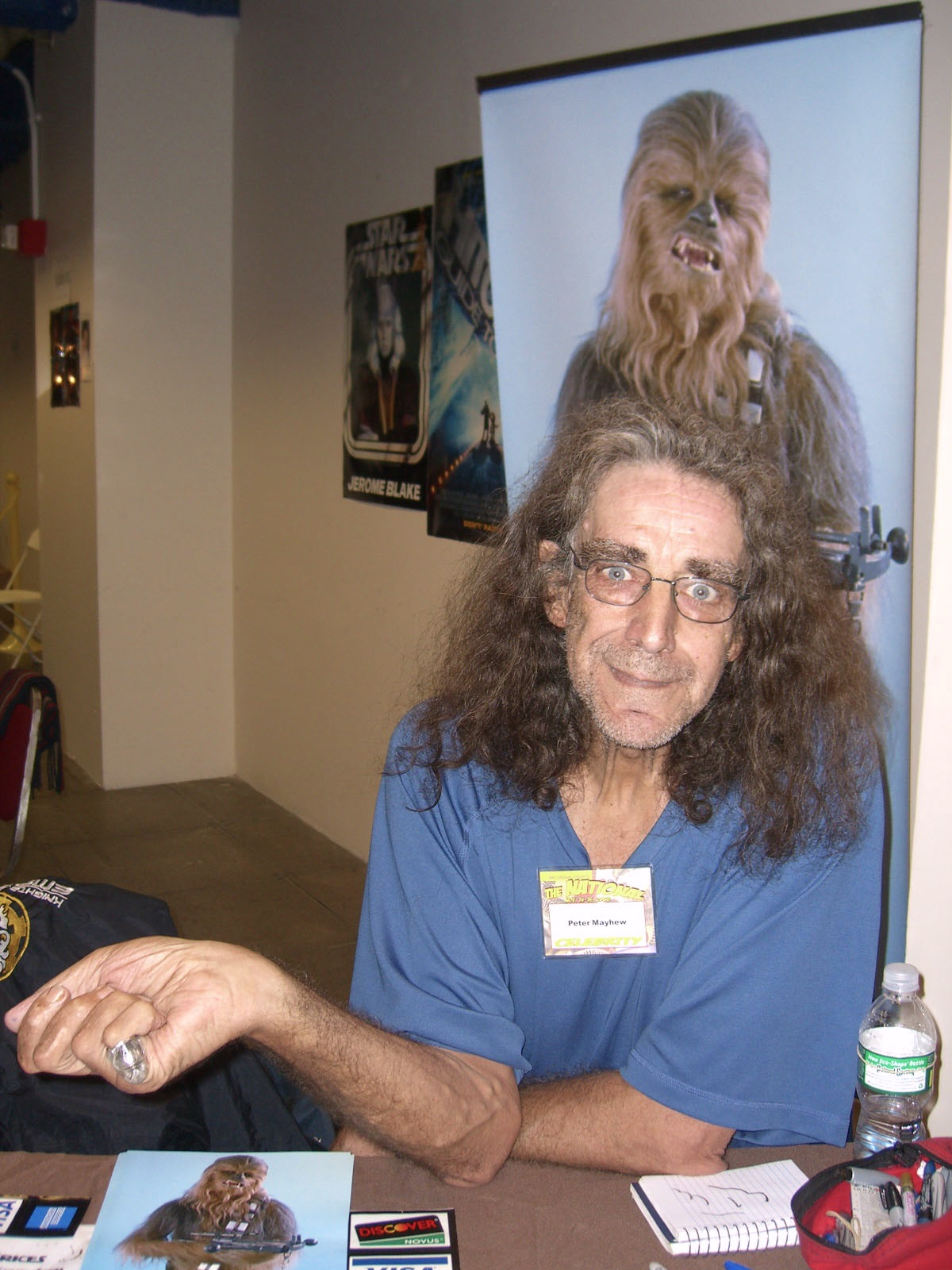
Mayhew at the 2008 Big Apple Con sitting in front of an image of Chewbacca

The release of Star Wars, the first film in the series and fourth chapter of the Skywalker saga, took place in 1977 and received positive reviews. He filmed several scenes for the original trilogy at Elstree Studios. Mayhew starred in The Empire Strikes Back; the film received positive reviews and was the highest-grossing film of the year. Ever since its release and even after a reassessment, it is considered to be the best film in the Star Wars series. He also appeared in the 1980 television documentary special, SP FX: The Empire Strikes Back.

Prior to the release of the Return of the Jedi, Mayhew appeared as Chewbacca in the unreleased 1982 mockumentary film, Return of the Ewok. He can be seen in a scene with Anthony Daniels as C-3PO, a remote-controlled R2-D2 and Warwick Davis in his Wicket costume asking them for directions to Jabba's palace. This mockumentary was filmed during the production of Return of the Jedi (at the time, Revenge of the Jedi). Although 1983's Return of the Jedi marked the end of the original trilogy, some back stories George Lucas created would generate production and filming of the prequel trilogy in the 1990s and eventually contribute to Mayhew's reprisal of the role. The actor shared his memories of his costume and experience on the first three films in the 2004 documentary film, Empire of Dreams: The Story of the Star Wars Trilogy. The documentary was included in the first DVD release of the original trilogy in September 2004.

==== 2003–2011: Revenge of the Sith and Star Wars: The Clone Wars ====
"As soon as I put the Chewie costume on, the character came out. It was like riding a bike. One minute I could be standing there talking to someone and having a normal conversation, but the moment I put on the mask, I became the character. Chewbacca literally came alive. It was quite amazing."

— -Peter Mayhew's memories of putting on the Chewbacca costume

By the time Star Wars: Episode II - Attack of the Clones was released to cinemas in May 2002, work had begun on the last film of the prequel trilogy. On 23 April 2003, it was announced on the Star Wars website that Mayhew would reprise his role in Revenge of the Sith, the last installment of the prequel trilogy and last film to be distributed by 20th Century Fox. It was also announced that two of his co-stars from the original trilogy, Anthony Daniels and Kenny Baker would reprise their roles as C-3PO and R2-D2 respectively. The events of the film take place 19 years before the first theatrical film Mayhew appeared in. Prior to the announcement, Mayhew received a phone call from Rick McCallum asking if he was available. Upon his return, Mayhew said, "Not only was it great personally to be able to become that character again, to bring him back after all this time, but it generally seemed to make people happy." He also described his character as "very comforting."

Most of the live-action scenes had been completed during the 57-day shoot in 2003, however several scenes including the Battle of Kashyyyk had not been. In the summer of 2003, Mayhew and seven new Wookiee performers had their costume fittings. A new Chewbacca costume was made for Mayhew and it included a foam musculature. The costume also reflected the character being 19 years younger than his counterpart in A New Hope. There was no ventilation system in the original costume but this time the new costume featured "an arterial cooling system underneath the fur." The updated costume featured "an articulated mask with radio-controlled facial servos." Mayhew's scenes were quieter because although Chewbacca was featured alongside Yoda the latter was digitally added later. Kashyyyk had been previously featured in Star Wars Holiday Special which Mayhew appeared in. Mayhew and the Wookiee actors filmed their scenes for the Battle of Kashyyyk at Sydney in the Spring of 2004. Mayhew admitted that the filmmaking techniques for Revenge of the Sith was different to the way the original trilogy was made because there was more blue screen.

Revenge of the Sith was released in cinemas in May 2005 and received positive reviews. He also recorded dialogue for the Star Wars: The Clone Wars Season 3 finale episode "Wookiee Hunt". The animated television series takes place between the events of Attack of the Clones and Revenge of the Sith.

==== 2012–2016: Last Star Wars film and successor ====
In October 2012, the Walt Disney Company acquired Lucasfilm and announced that the sequel trilogy would be made with Episode VII being released in 2015. Mayhew hoped that he could be involved in the new film saying, "It was just a question of waiting and seeing what was happening, and whether it would be a series or just one movie". In April 2014, it was announced that Mayhew would reprise his role in the first instalment of the sequel trilogy and seventh Star Wars film. A new Chewbacca costume was made and was more comfortable. He acted opposite several of his co-stars including Harrison Ford from the original trilogy again and new cast members including Daisy Ridley and John Boyega. The Force Awakens was the first live-action Star Wars film to be distributed by Walt Disney Studios Motion Pictures. The film received positive reviews, was the highest grossing film of 2015, grossed $2.07 billion worldwide and became the third-highest grossing film at the time of its release.

While Mayhew portrayed Chewbacca in Star Wars: The Force Awakens, he was not in Star Wars: The Last Jedi but was listed in the credits as "Chewbacca Consultant". Mayhew retired from playing Chewbacca due to health issues. Joonas Suotamo shared the role of Chewbacca with Mayhew in Star Wars: The Force Awakens, portraying the character in physically demanding scenes and then completely replaced him in subsequent Star Wars films. (Note: The Last Jedi, Solo: A Star Wars Story and The Rise of Skywalker.) Mayhew and Suotamo spent several weeks discussing the character and costume.

==== 1977–2019: Television, commercials and other appearances ====
Mayhew made a guest appearance in a Star Wars special of the Donny & Marie show. He and Anthony Daniels were the only actors from Star Wars to appear in the television special. Mayhew played the role in the 1978 television film Star Wars Holiday Special, set between the events of Star Wars and the yet to be released sequel. The television special was broadcast only once and received negative reviews but became a cult classic among Star Wars fans when bootleg recordings were uploaded to the internet. In 1980 made a guest appearance on The Muppet Show, The Stars of Star Wars; the crossover episode also starred Daniels as C-3PO, Mark Hamill as Luke Skywalker and R2-D2 who went on a search for Chewbacca. They filmed scenes at ATV Studios in January 1980.

Mayhew played the role in commercials and hospital appearances for sick children, and made numerous appearances as Chewbacca outside the Star Wars films. Mayhew, appearing as Chewbacca, was honoured with a Lifetime Achievement Award at the MTV Film Awards 1997.

He also made other media appearances outside of playing Chewbacca. He appeared on NBC's Identity, where his identity was based on his role as Chewbacca and was a frequent guest in the early days of Slice of SciFi.

His final convention appearance was Star Wars Celebration Chicago in 2019.

=== Other work ===
Outside Star Wars, Mayhew appeared in the 1978 horror film Terror, directed by Norman J. Warren. In the English version of Dragon Ball GT: A Hero's Legacy, he provided the voice for Susha. He also appeared in Yesterday Was a Lie.

=== Books ===
Mayhew wrote two books for younger audiences: Growing Up Giant, which explains that being different is a strength instead of a weakness, and the anti-bullying book for children My Favorite Giant. He wrote the introduction for Dark Horse's Star Wars: Chewbacca. This comic book series published in 2000 follows Chewbacca's death in the 1999 Legends novel, The New Jedi Order: Vector Prime. (Note: In 2014, the Expanded Universe (including Vector Prime) was rebranded Legends; in contrast with the Legends continuity, Chewbacca appears and survives in the sequel trilogy set decades after Return of the Jedi.)

== Personal life ==
Mayhew moved to Wheathead Lane, Keighley, West Yorkshire, in 1987. He invested in and worked at a timber yard just over the City of Bradford border in South Craven, North Yorkshire. He became a supporter of Keighley Rugby Union Football Club.

Mayhew married Mary Angelique "Angie" Luker (née Cigainero), a native of Texas, in 1999. The two lived in Boyd, Texas, United States, where he had moved to in 2000. Peter was the stepfather to Mary's three children. It was reported that his wife would head his namesake charity, the Peter Mayhew Foundation.

Mayhew became a naturalised citizen of the United States in 2005 at a ceremony in Arlington, Texas. In an interview with the Fort Worth Star-Telegram, he joked that he did not get a medal at this ceremony either, a reference to the closing scene in Star Wars during which Luke Skywalker and Han Solo get medals, but Chewbacca does not. Mayhew noted in an MTV interview that although Chewbacca does not get a medal in the film, he does have the last line of dialogue, when he roars.

In a 2011 interview for Star Wars Insider, when he asked if he collected merchandise related to his character, he said he had "a very interesting collection" including drawings and models from the audience at conventions, newspaper cuttings, art and 23-inch dolls.

Mayhew underwent double knee replacement surgery in 2013, having been a full-time wheelchair user for the previous two years and still largely reliant on it at the time of filming The Force Awakens. In July 2018, Mayhew announced via Twitter that he had successfully undergone unspecified spinal surgery to improve his mobility, and was recovering.

== Death and tributes ==
Mayhew died of a heart attack on 30 April 2019, at his home in Boyd, Texas, at age 74. He was buried in Reno, Parker County, Texas, in Azleland Memorial Park and Mausoleum.

Harrison Ford praised Mayhew for his "great dignity and noble character". Mark Hamill called Mayhew "the gentlest of giants."

Anthony Daniels detailed his recollections about working with Mayhew on the original trilogy, the Star Wars Holiday Special and television shows and their reunion in The Force Awakens in his 2019 memoirs, I Am C-3PO: The Inside Story.

== Filmography ==
=== Film ===
Year	Title	Role	Notes	Ref.
1977	Star Wars	Chewbacca		
1977	Sinbad and the Eye of the Tiger	Minoton	Uncredited	
1978	Terror	The Mechanic		
1980	The Empire Strikes Back	Chewbacca		
1982	Return of the Ewok	Chewbacca	Video	
1983	Return of the Jedi	Chewbacca		
1987	Star Tours	Chewbacca	Short; uncredited	
2004	Comic Book: The Movie	Himself		
2004	Empire of Dreams: The Story of the Star Wars Trilogy	Himself	Documentary film	
2005	Star Wars: Episode III – Revenge of the Sith	Chewbacca		
2008	Yesterday Was a Lie	Dead Man		
2009	Fanboys	Himself	Uncredited	
2015	Star Wars: The Force Awakens	Chewbacca	Shared role with Joonas Suotamo and final film role	

=== Television ===
Year	Title	Role	Notes	Ref.
1977	Donny & Marie	Chewbacca	Episode # 3.1	
1978	Star Wars Holiday Special	Chewbacca	TV special	
1979	Hazell	Hazell "Big Hazell"		
1980	The Muppet Show	Chewbacca	Episode: The Stars of Star Wars	
1980	SP FX: The Empire Strikes Back	Himself	Television documentary drama	
1981	Dark Towers	The Tall Knight		
1985	The Kenny Everett Television Show	Various	Episode #3.3	
2004	Dragon Ball GT: A Hero's Legacy	Susha (Gettō)	Voice; English dub; TV special	
2011	Star Wars: The Clone Wars	Chewbacca	Episode: Wookiee Hunt; Special Thanks	
2011	Glee	Chewbacca	Episode: Extraordinary Merry Christmas	
2012	Breaking In	Himself	Episode: Episode XIII	
2015	Comic Book Men	Himself	Episode: Wookiee Fever	

== See also ==
- List of tallest people
