= David Prowse =

English actor, bodybuilder and weightlifter (1935–2020)

David Prowse MBE
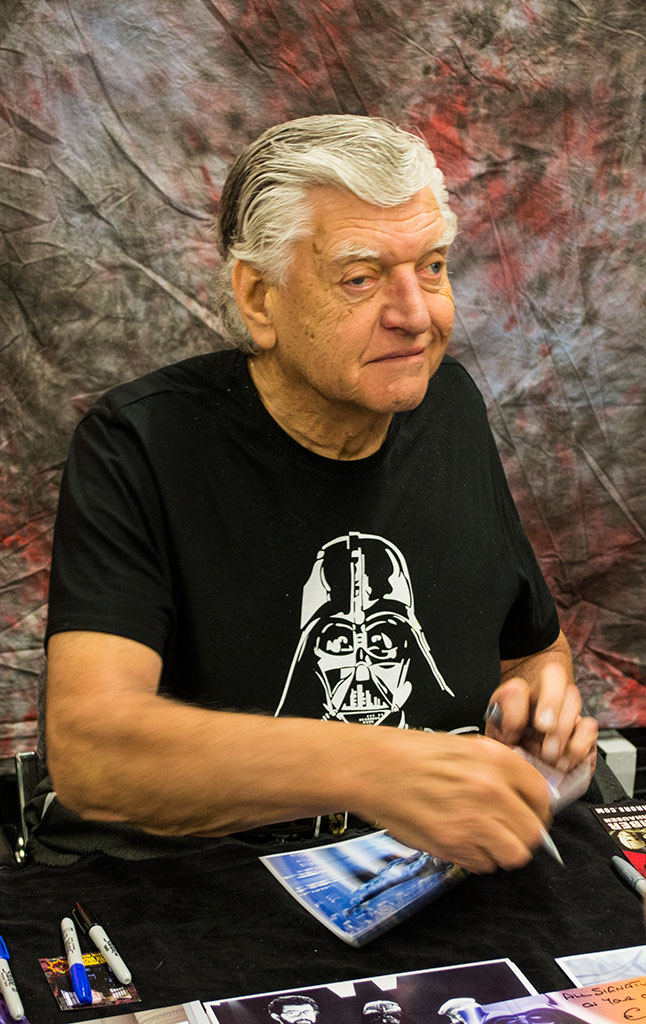
- Prowse in 2013
- Born: David Charles Prowse; 1 July 1935; Bristol, England
- Died: 28 November 2020 (aged 85); London, England
- Education: Bristol Grammar School
- Occupations: Actor; bodybuilder; weightlifter
- Years active: 1950–2017
- Height: 6 ft 6 in (1.98 m)
- Spouse: Norma E. Scammell (m. 1963)
- Children: 3
- Website: www.darthvader-starwars.com

David Charles Prowse (1 July 1935 – 28 November 2020) was an English actor, bodybuilder, strongman and weightlifter. He portrayed Darth Vader in the original Star Wars trilogy and a manservant in Stanley Kubrick's 1971 film A Clockwork Orange. In 2015, he starred in two documentaries concerning his Darth Vader role, one titled The Force's Mouth, which included Prowse voicing Darth Vader's lines with studio effects applied for the first time, and the other titled I Am Your Father, covering the subject of the fallout between Prowse and Lucasfilm.

Prior to his role as Vader, Prowse had established himself as a super-hero figure in the United Kingdom as the Green Cross Man in Green Cross Code media aimed at teaching children and young people road safety.

== Early life ==
David Charles Prowse was born on 1 July 1935 in Bristol, England. He was the son of Gladys (née Burt) and Charles Prowse. He was brought up on the Southmead housing estate in Bristol, gaining a scholarship to Bristol Grammar School. Prowse was tall, standing 6 ft 6 in (1.98 m), and developed an interest in bodybuilding. His early jobs included working as a bouncer at a dance hall and at Henleaze Swimming Pool, where he met his future wife. Following his successes from 1961 in the British heavyweight weightlifting championship, he left Bristol in 1963 to work for a London weightlifting company.

== Career ==
=== Weightlifting and training ===
Prowse won the British heavyweight weightlifting championship in 1962. The following two years he represented England in the weightlifting event at the 1962 British Empire and Commonwealth Games in Perth, Western Australia. During his bodybuilding course, Prowse became friends with Arnold Schwarzenegger and Lou Ferrigno.

Prowse could deadlift as much as 785 lb (356 kg) and in 1963, became the first man to lift the Dinnie Stones after Dinnie father and son duo. During his prime, Prowse weighed around 283 pounds (128 kg).

During the 1970s, Prowse developed a minor interest with wrestling and trained many British wrestlers of the time.

Prowse helped to train Christopher Reeve for the lead role in Superman (1978) after lobbying for the part himself. In a television interview, he related how his response to being told "we've found our Superman" was "Thank you very much." Only then was he told that Reeve had been chosen for the role and he was to only be a trainer. He trained Cary Elwes for his role as Westley in The Princess Bride (1987).

Prowse also became fitness consultant to Harrods, ripped up phone books under the stage name 'Jack the Ripper', and opened a series of gyms, including The Dave Prowse Fitness Centre in Southwark, London. Notably, Arnold Schwarzenegger sometimes trained at Prowse's gym and the British bodybuilder was also a judge at the last Mr. Universe contest Schwarzenegger won.

After making his last professional film appearance as Vader in 1983, he returned his major focus to weightlifting and continued to appear on some strength demonstrations in the United Kingdom until the late 1990s.

=== Acting ===
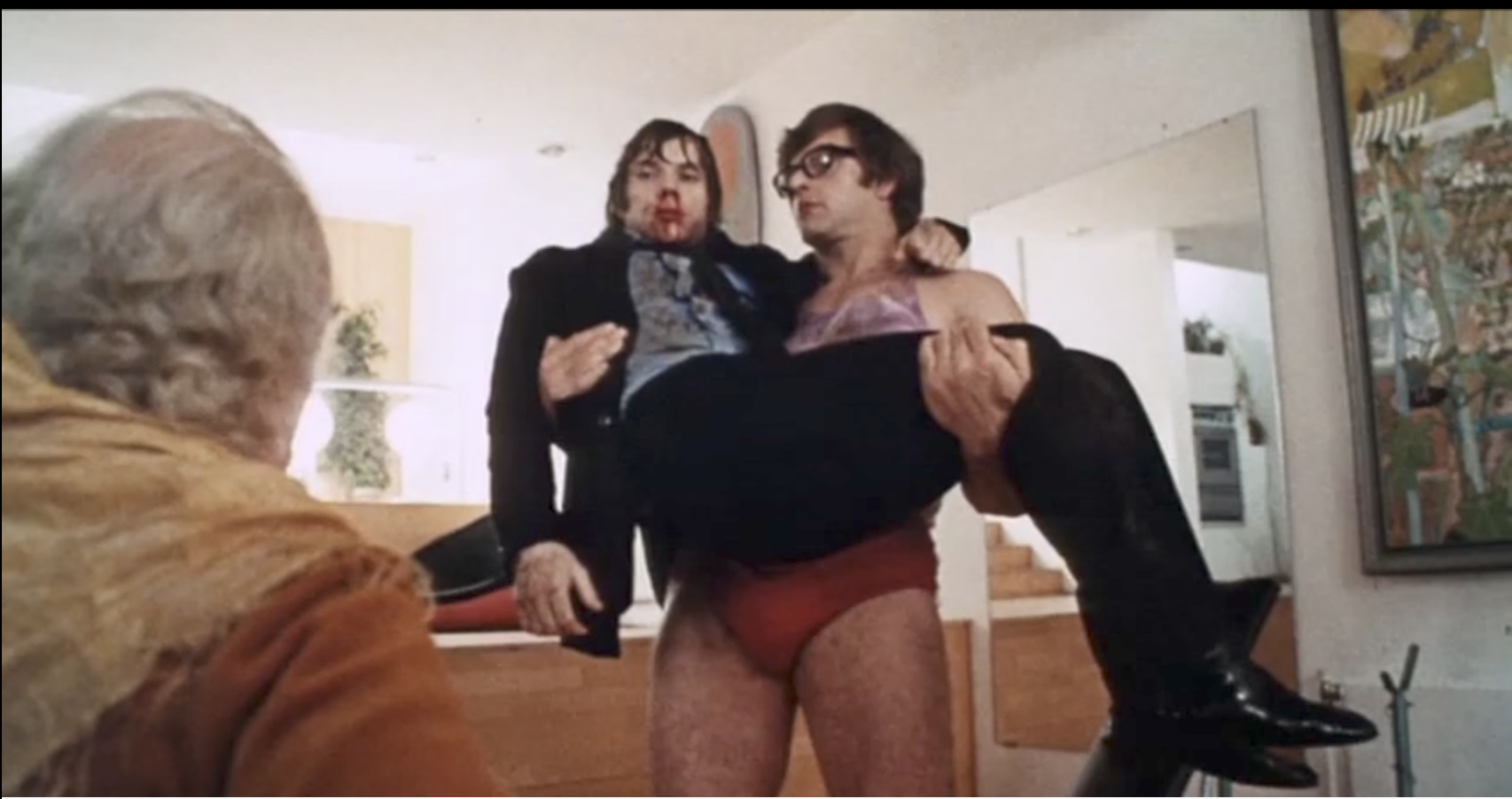
Prowse as Julian holding Alex (Malcolm McDowell) in A Clockwork Orange (1971)

His first appearance is a brief cameo in a gym as a weightlifter in the 1968 TV show The Champions: the opening sequence of episode 2 "The Invisible Man". Also in 1968, he was cast as kilt wearing and bagpipe playing Emlyn MacGregor in The Beverly Hillbillies episode "Coming Through the Rye" (season 7 episode 4). He made an appearance as henchman Tony in the 1969 TV show The Saint (series 6 episode 20) starring Roger Moore.

In the United Kingdom, Prowse was well known as the Green Cross Man, a superhero invented to promote a road safety campaign for children in 1975. As a result of his association with the campaign, which ran between 1971 and 1990, he received the MBE in 2000.

He had a role as Frank Alexander's manservant, Julian, in the film A Clockwork Orange (1971), in which he was noticed by the future Star Wars director George Lucas. He played a circus strongman in Vampire Circus (1972), a Minotaur in the Doctor Who serial The Time Monster (also 1972), and an android named Coppin in The Tomorrow People in 1973. He appeared in an episode of Space: 1999, "The Beta Cloud" (1976), right before he was cast as Darth Vader. Around that time, he appeared as the Black Knight in the Terry Gilliam film Jabberwocky (1977) and was supposed to play Minoton in Sinbad and the Eye of the Tiger (1977), but the part went to Peter Mayhew instead, who later played Chewbacca in Star Wars.

Prowse claimed that he nearly got the role of Jaws in James Bond (which ultimately went to Richard Kiel) and was offered the part of Conan the Barbarian before Arnold Schwarzenegger.

Prowse had a small role as Hotblack Desiato's bodyguard in the 1981 BBC TV adaptation of The Hitchhiker's Guide to the Galaxy. He appeared in the first series of Ace of Wands on LWT and as a bodyguard in Callan (1974), a feature film version of the TV series, as well as the character Wellington in one episode of the TV series. He played Charles, the duke's wrestler, in the BBC Television Shakespeare production of As You Like It in 1978.

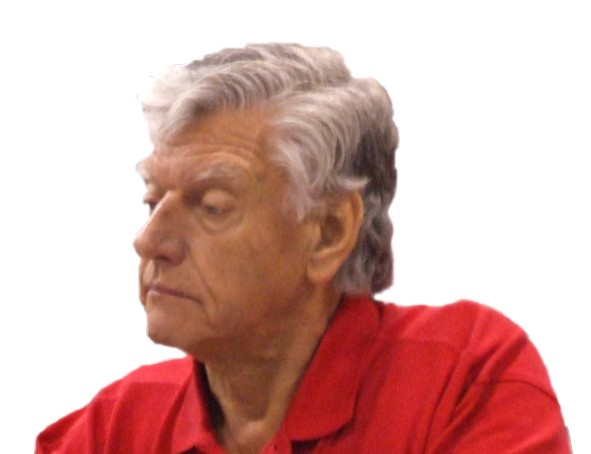
Prowse in 2007

Prowse played Frankenstein's monster in three films, Casino Royale and the Hammer horrors The Horror of Frankenstein and Frankenstein and the Monster from Hell. Prowse made two uncredited appearances on The Benny Hill Show. On Hill's first show for Thames Television in 1969, he played a briefs-clad muscleman in the "Ye Olde Wishing Well" quickie, and in 1984 "Scuttlevision" he showed off his muscles in a sketch set to the song "Stupid Cupid". The earlier routine was also featured in the 1974 film The Best of Benny Hill, in which he was credited.

Among his many non-speaking roles, Prowse played a major role in "Portrait of Brenda", the penultimate episode of The Saint broadcast in 1969.

In May 2010, he played Frank Bryan in The Kindness of Strangers, an independent British film produced by Queen Bee Films. The film screened at the 2010 Cannes Film Festival.

==== Star Wars ====
Prowse played the physical form of Darth Vader in the original Star Wars trilogy. Prowse spoke the dialogue during filming, but George Lucas wanted a "darker voice" than Prowse's relatively jovial West Country accent, and had James Earl Jones provide a more sinister, malevolent voice for the character. Prowse stated he was originally told he would be seen and heard at the end of Return of the Jedi when Vader's mask was removed. Instead, actor Sebastian Shaw was used. Upon Prowse's death, Lucas stated that:

David brought a physicality to Darth Vader that was essential for the character. He made Vader leap off the page and on to the big screen, with an imposing stature and movement performance to match the intensity and undercurrent of Vader's presence. David was up for anything and contributed to the success of what would become a memorable, tragic figure.

In the 2004 documentary Empire of Dreams, actress Carrie Fisher, who played Princess Leia in the original trilogy films, quipped that they nicknamed Prowse "Darth Farmer" (a jibe regarding his West Country accent). In the lightsaber fight scenes between Vader and Luke Skywalker (Mark Hamill), Prowse, who was not a very skilled swordsman and kept breaking the staves used as the lightsabers, was replaced by the scene's fight choreographer, the stuntman and fencing coach Bob Anderson. Prowse felt sidelined by Anderson during the making of Return of the Jedi in particular, and said he was only able to persuade director Richard Marquand that he should be the one to throw Emperor Palpatine (Ian McDiarmid) down the shaft after Marquand had tried and failed for a week to film the scene successfully without him.

Prowse reprised his role of Darth Vader for the video games Star Wars: The Interactive Video Board Game (1996) and Monopoly Star Wars (1997). In 1977, Prowse appeared as a contestant on the syndicated version of the game show To Tell The Truth, hosted by Joe Garagiola.

After the original trilogy, future actors to succeed Prowse in his physical portrayal of Darth Vader include Spencer Wilding and Daniel Naprous (Rogue One), Hayden Christensen (Revenge of the Sith, Obi-Wan Kenobi), Dmitrious Bistrevsky and Tom O'Connell (Obi-Wan Kenobi). Nevertheless, they were criticized by some fans of not having the same "body width" and intimidating movements as Prowse.

In 2002, Prowse became an honorary member and honorary leader of the 501st Legion, a fan group dedicated to Star Wars costuming.

Prowse continued to associate himself with his role in the Star Wars films and was involved in the convention circuit. Despite this, he was not included in some reunions of the original cast, such as those for the Empire of Dreams documentary and the 2005 Vanity Fair cover. While being interviewed by Kevin Moore of The Moore Show Prime Time, he admitted his dislike of the prequel trilogy and said the new films were "out of context" in terms of special effects in comparison to the original trilogy.

In July 2007, Prowse joined many others from the Star Wars films for the first ever Star Wars Celebration event held outside the United States. It was run by Lucasfilm Ltd. and the Cards Inc. Group, at the ExCeL Exhibition Centre in London. The occasion was to mark the 30th anniversary of Star Wars.

Prowse played a cameo role in the Star Wars fan films "Order of the Sith: Vengeance" and its sequel "Downfall" – Order of the Sith, alongside Jeremy Bulloch and Michael Sheard. These fan films were made in Britain in support of the charity Save the Children.

In 2008, he was one of the cast members featured on Justin Lee Collins's Bring Back...Star Wars. In the episode, Prowse commented that he had a dispute with Lucas after he allegedly leaked reports of Darth Vader's death to the press. Prowse had previously suggested that Darth Vader could be Luke Skywalker's father in a speech he gave to University of California, Berkeley, in 1978. However, this was shortly after the release of Star Wars and nearly two years before The Empire Strikes Back was released, and the script had not even been written at the time. Gary Kurtz, the producer of The Empire Strikes Back, said in the 2015 documentary I Am Your Father that Prowse's apparent plot spoiler was simply "a good guess."

Prowse stated his contract for Return of the Jedi included a share of profits on the film, and although it grossed $475 million on a $32 million budget, Prowse explained in an interview in 2009 that he never received residuals for his performance. Due to "Hollywood accounting", the actual profits are sent as "distribution fees" to the studio, leaving nothing to distribute to others.

In July 2010, Prowse was banned by Lucas from attending official Star Wars fan conventions. Lucas had given Prowse no reason, other than stating that Prowse "burnt too many bridges" between Lucasfilm and himself.

In 2011, Prowse wrote and released his autobiography Straight from the Force's Mouth.

A 2015 Spanish documentary by filmmaker Marcos Cabotá, entitled I Am Your Father, detailed Prowse's then life and his blackballing by Lucasfilm, which the documentary suggested was unjustified. The leaks featured in the documentary originated from a technician working on the films.

=== Partnership with Jayce Lewis ===
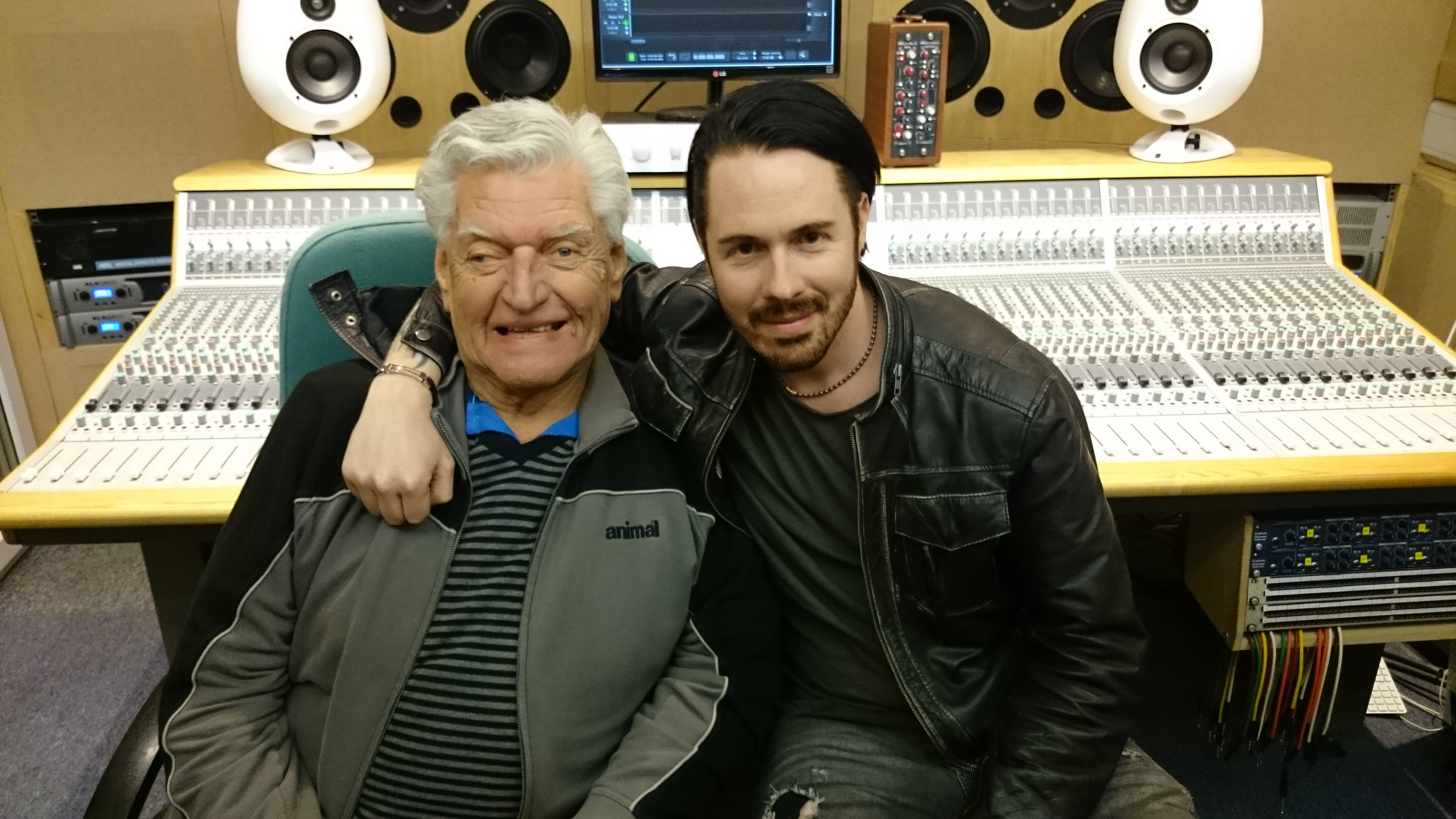
Prowse and Jayce Lewis, photographed in 2015

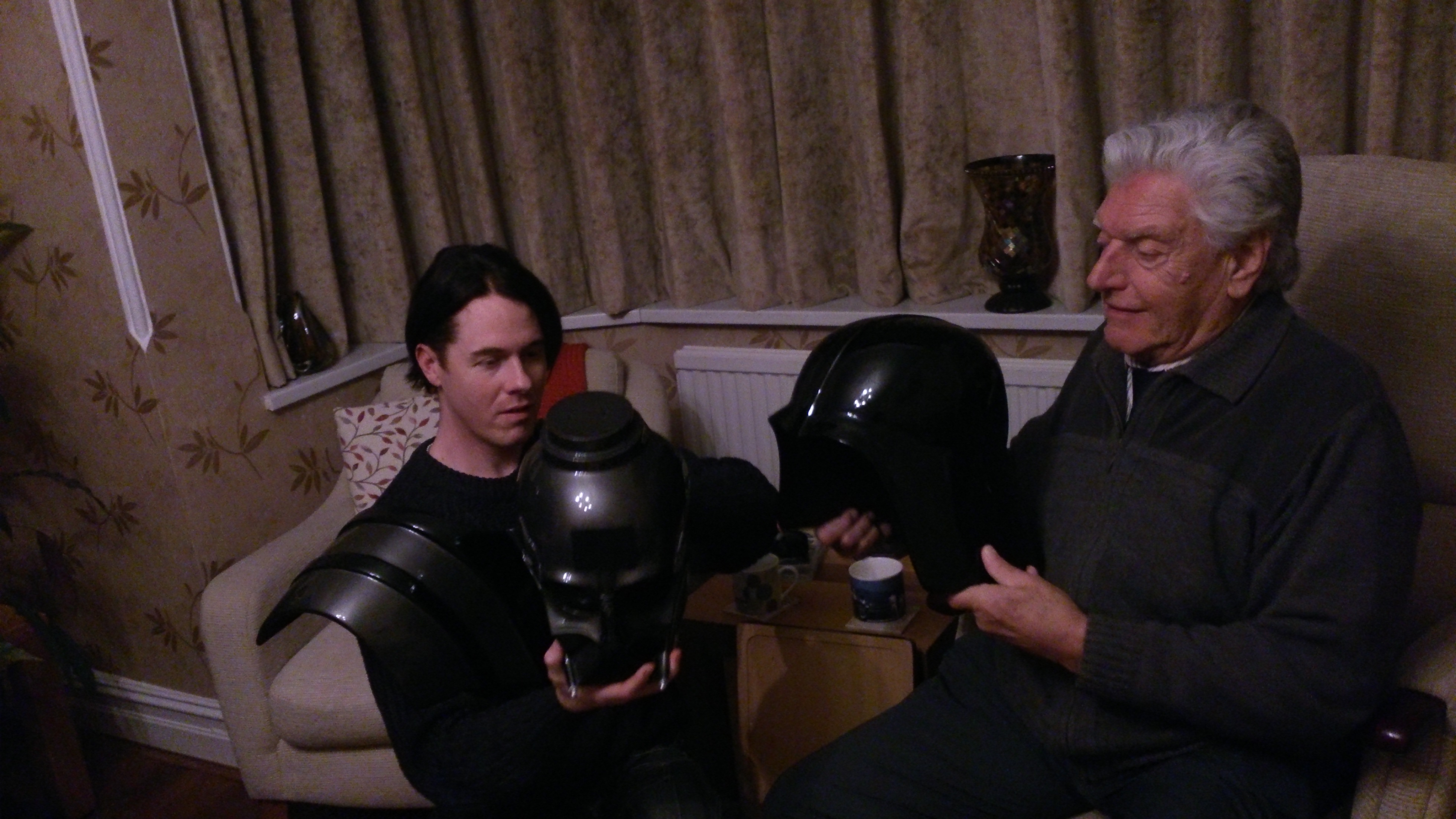
David Prowse and Jayce Lewis with Darth Vader helmet

Prowse became friends with Welsh musician Jayce Lewis when the latter was a teenager, after they met at a science fiction convention. At the convention, Lewis recalled learning that Prowse's son, whom he later met after a performance, was also a drummer. On their shared musical interest, Prowse identified himself as "a music fan for years, going from big band jazz, trad jazz, modern and progressive."

The two became business partners with Prowse taking on a management and public relations role. He was also featured in the music video for "Shields" on the album Orderart. On 1 October 2015, Lewis created a mini-documentary entitled The Force's Mouth, which gave Prowse the opportunity to hear himself voicing Darth Vader's lines with studio effects applied for the first time.

== Personal life ==
Prowse married Norma Scammell in 1963 and was the father of three children. He was a supporter of Bristol Rugby Club. He lived in Addiscombe, Croydon, in Surrey from 1963.

Prowse publicly declared his support for the UK Independence Party in the 2009 European Parliament election: "I've looked right and left and right again and the only party I can safely vote for is UKIP."

=== Health problems ===
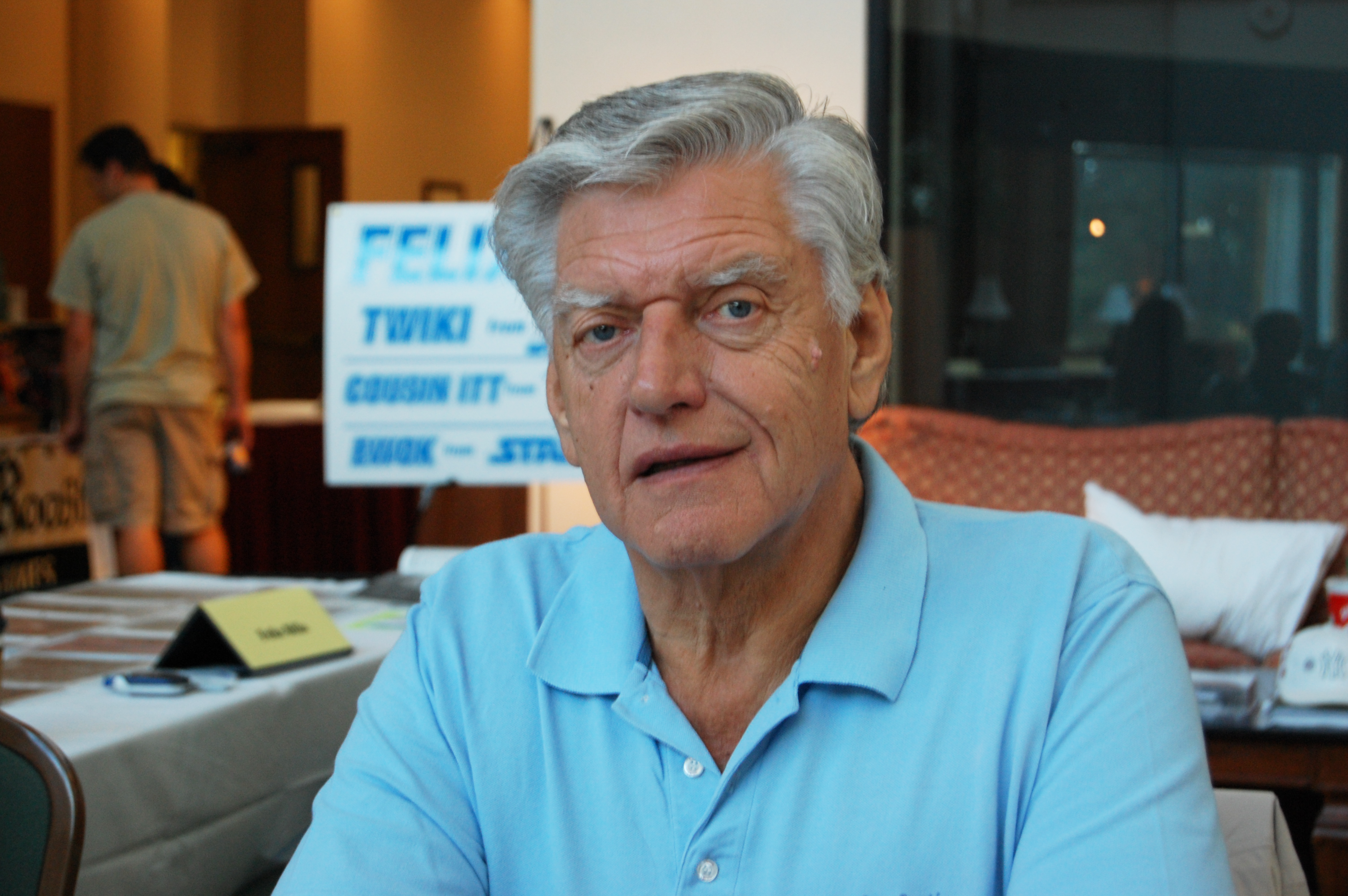
Prowse at Mountain-Con in 2007

Prowse suffered from arthritis for much of his life. This led to replacements of both hips, and to his ankle being fused, as well as several revisionary surgeries on his hip replacements. His arthritic symptoms first appeared when he was 13. Though they seemingly disappeared after he took up competitive weightlifting, they reappeared in 1990.

Prowse worked with multiple arthritis organisations in Britain and was vice-president of the Physically Handicapped and Able-bodied Association.

In March 2009, Prowse revealed that he was suffering from prostate cancer. He underwent radiation therapy at the Royal Marsden Hospital in South London. Later that year he was said to be in remission.

In November 2014, the Daily Mirror reported that he had dementia. Prowse denied this, but admitted that he had problems with his memory, which he put down to age.

=== Retirement ===
In late 2017, Prowse retired from all public appearances and events, due to ill health and the wishes of his family. His final onscreen appearance was filmed with his long-time friend the Welsh musician Jayce Lewis in a sci-fi music video titled Shields. Upon completing production Prowse was quoted as saying; Well, that's that and Jayce as responding; Job done, Legacy made!

=== Death ===
Prowse died at a hospital in London, England, on 28 November 2020, aged 85.

== Honours and awards ==
Prowse was appointed Member of the Order of the British Empire (MBE) for services to charity and road safety at the New Year Honours in 2000.

== Filmography ==
Year	Title	Role	Notes	Ref.
1967	Casino Royale	Frankenstein's Creature	Uncredited	
1968	Hammerhead	George		
1968	The Saint (TV series)	Tony	Episode: "Portrait of Brenda"	
1970	The Horror of Frankenstein	The Creation		
1971	Up Pompeii	Muscular Man	Uncredited	
1971	Up the Chastity Belt	Sir Grumbel		
1971	Carry On Henry	Bearded torturer		
1971	A Clockwork Orange	Julian		
1972	Vampire Circus	Strong man		
1972	Doctor Who	Minotaur	Episode: "The Time Monster"	
1973	Black Snake	Jonathan Walker		
1973	White Cargo	Harry		
1973	The Tomorrow People	Android	Series 1 Story 2: "The Medusa Strain"	
1974	Frankenstein and the Monster from Hell	Creation		
1974	Callan	Arthur		
1976	Space: 1999	The Beta Cloud Creature	Episode: "The Beta Cloud"	
1977	Star Wars	Darth Vader	Voiced by James Earl Jones	
1977	Jabberwocky	Red Herring and Black Knights		
1977	The People That Time Forgot	Executioner		
1978	A Horseman Riding By	Jem Pollock	Part 7: "1914: The Last Hot Summer"	
1978	As You Like It (BBC Television Shakespeare)	Charles	Credited as Dave Prowse	
1980	The Empire Strikes Back	Darth Vader	Voiced by James Earl Jones	
1983	Return of the Jedi	Darth Vader	Voiced by James Earl Jones	
2004	Saving Star Wars	Dave Prowse		
2006	Perfect Woman	Dr Maurice Hawkins		
2008	Bring Back...Star Wars	Himself	TV documentary	
2010	The Kindness of Strangers	Frank Bryan		
2015	Elstree 1976	Himself		
2015	I Am Your Father	Himself		
2015	The Force's Mouth	Himself	Documentary	
2017	Jayce Lewis – "Shields"	Himself	Music video	
