= London Film and Comic Con =

Movie and comic convention held in London

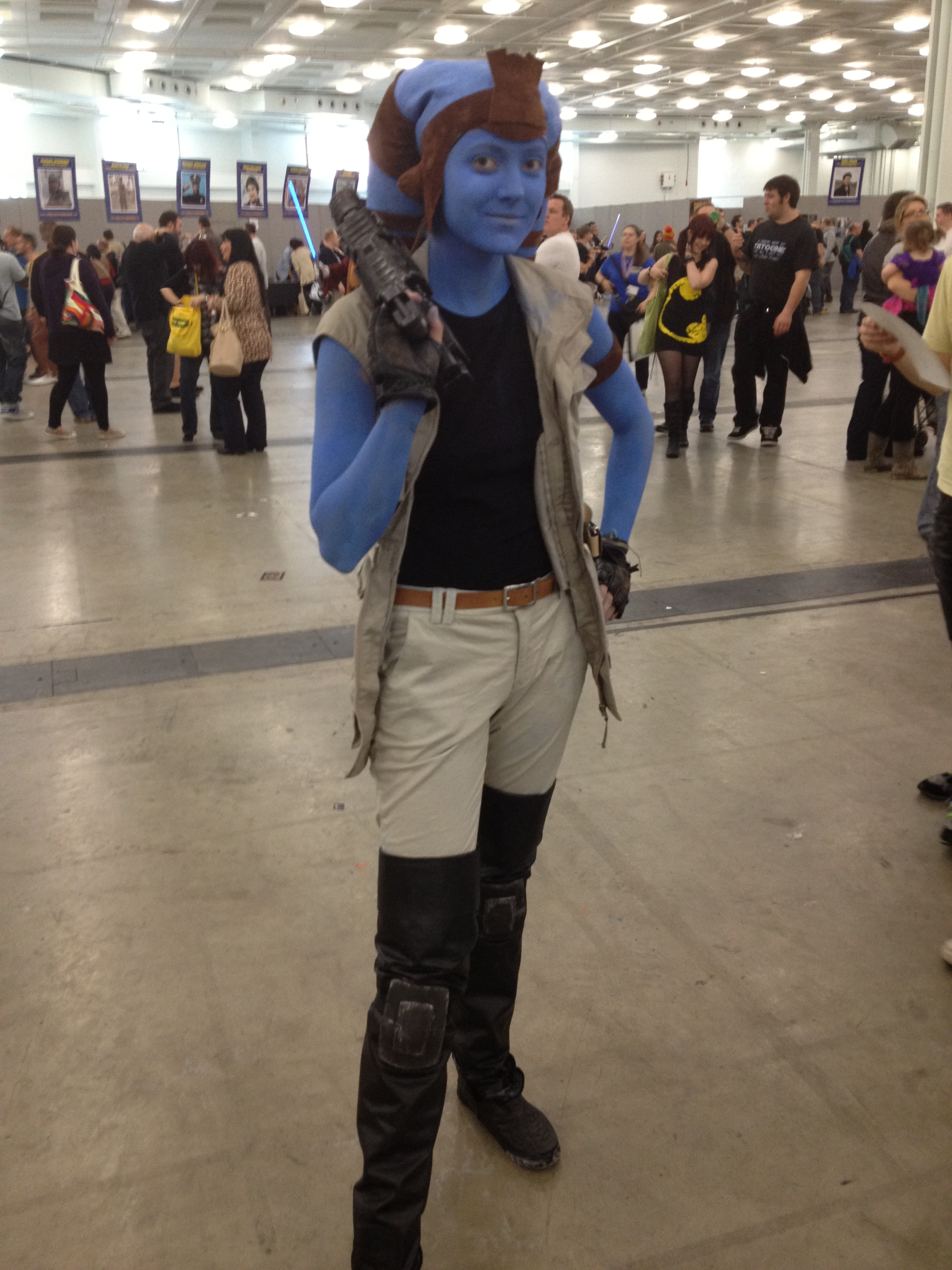
- Cosplayer as a Twi'lek, at the London Film and Comic Con in July 2012
- Status: Active
- Genre: Speculative fiction
- Venue: Olympia
- Locations: London, England
- Inaugurated: 2004
- Organizer: Showmasters Ltd
- Website: www.londonfilmandcomiccon.com

London Film and Comic Con is a fan convention held annually in London that focuses on films, TV shows, sci-fi, fantasy, video games, anime, manga, cosplay, comic books and other popular media. It is organised by Showmasters Ltd.

== History and organization ==
London Film & Comic Con began in 2004 and is organised by Showmasters, the same company that organises the Autographica and Collectormania events. In the past, the convention featured guests that included actors and actresses from popular film franchises and television series, including Doctor Who, Star Trek, Star Wars, the Wizarding World, and Heroes, among others.

The convention holds a large dealers hall selling film, TV, comic, sci-fi and fantasy-related memorabilia and original film props, along with guest talks, professional photoshoots, autograph sessions, cosplay events, and displays.

The 2014 LFCC was the venue for the one-and-only presentation of the True Believer Comic Awards, the successor to the long-running Eagle Awards. The inaugural True Believer Comics Awards were presented 12 July 2014, at the LFCC, with host Anthony Stewart Head and featuring a special appearance by Stan Lee. They have not been awarded since.

=== COVID-19 pandemic ===
The 2020 LFCC was originally planned for July 2020, however due to the COVID-19 pandemic, it was initially delayed to November 2020 before being delayed again to July 2021. The LFCC Spring that was due to be held in February 2021 was cancelled. It officially returned in November 2021.

== Venue ==
In 2004, London Film & Comic Con was held at the Wembley Exhibition Centre before being moved to Earls Court in 2005. LFCC was hosted at Earls Court every year until 2014, with the exception of 2012, when it was hosted in Olympia due to the London Olympics taking place. In 2015, LFCC made a full-time move to Olympia as Earls Court was demolished.

== Show features ==
=== Cosplay ===
Members of the public are allowed, and in many cases encouraged, to take part in cosplay. Cosplaying has become one of the most popular parts of London Film and Comic Con. This can be to show off the costumer's latest work, to show devotion to their favourite characters or fandoms, or engage in role-play with other cosplayers in the same series, as well as to meet new people with mutual interests.

=== Guests ===
Guests from popular media are commonly invited to the convention. They take part for a variety of reasons. Often, this is to promote their latest product or production whether it be film, TV or print. Sometimes, it can be to raise awareness and funds for a charity or cause important to them.

=== Autographs ===
The event also includes an autograph area where high-profile guests from films, TV shows and other works of popular media sign items for the public.

=== Retro Gaming area ===
LFCC has an area dedicated to retro gaming consoles for the public to play.

=== Comic Zone ===
This is an LFCC dedicated area for members of the public to meet and engage with comic creators. The Comic Zone also holds specialist talks from comic creators as well as smaller symposiums, designed to act as masterclasses for creators exhibiting in Artists Alley.

In 2023, it was announced that the Comic Zone, usually composed of two sections, Artists Alley and the Guest Area, would be combined under one team, with returning Comic Zone organiser Tony Lee, who ran the zone from 2017-2021, working with a specially picked working group on guest announcements, panels, a symposium series for exhibitors and a new Hall of Fame awards.

== Location and dates ==
Dates	Location	Notable guests
6–7 March 2004	Wembley Exhibition Centre	Andy Serkis, Brent Spiner, John Noble, Adam West, Billy Boyd, John Rhys-Davies, Pat Morita, Tony Todd, Danny John-Jules, Chris Barrie, Norman Lovett, Chloë Annett, Tony Amendola, Vanessa Angel
6–7 November 2004	Wembley Exhibition Centre	Simon Pegg, Burt Reynolds, Jonathan Frakes, Linda Blair, Rob Van Dam, Carl Weathers, Michael Ironside, Ray Park, Michael Biehn, Mark Metcalf, D. B. Woodside, Veronica Cartwright, Chris Judge, Dan Shea, David Hewlett
25–26 June 2005	Earls Court 2	Ron Perlman, John Barrowman, Lou Ferrigno, Charisma Carpenter, Billy Boyd, Xander Berkeley, Adam Baldwin, Warwick Davis, Sandra Dickinson, David Dixon, Sarah Clarke
1–2 July 2006	Earls Court 2	Elijah Wood, Nathan Fillion, Alan Tudyk, Carrie Fisher, Jorge Garcia, Maggie Grace, Corey Haim, Peter Mayhew, Kenny Baker, David Prowse, Gates McFadden, John Barrowman, Roger Lloyd-Pack, Richard Briers, Don Warrington, Eugene Washington
1–2 September 2007	Earls Court 1	Patrick Stewart, Jack Coleman, Hayden Panettiere, Dominic Monaghan, Milo Ventimiglia, Adrian Pasdar, Michael Biehn, William Mapother, Mads Mikkelsen, Andy Hallett, Billy West, Phil Daniels, Anita Dobson, Harry Melling, Natalia Tena
19–20 July 2008	Earls Court 2	Christopher Lloyd, Peter Davison, Patrick Stewart, Karen Allen, Paul Freeman, Wolf Kahler, John Hurt, Margot Kidder, David Warner, Deep Roy, David Anders, Sylvester McCoy, Charlie Weber, Georgia Tennant, Bill Oddie, Jason Mewes, Claudia Black, Kenny Baker, Tom Savini, Tim Brooke-Taylor, Alexander Siddig, Charles Dance, John Landis, Rick Yune, Brad Dourif
18–19 July 2009	Earls Court 2	Scott Bakula, Tom Baker, Edward Furlong, Peter Facinelli, Keeley Hawes, Jake Lloyd, Michael Ironside, Vic Mignogna, Danny Trejo, Chris Sarandon, Anna Walton, Michael Shanks, Sendhil Ramamurthy, Jewel Staite, Frazer Hines, Danny John-Jules, Jerome Blake, Josh Herdman, Sean Maguire, James Phelps, Oliver Phelps, Bruce Boxleitner, Thomas Sangster, David Prowse, Angelica Mandy, Chloë Annett, Dominic Keating, Nina Young, Jimmy Jean Louis, Alex Meraz, Justin Chon, Mark Ryan, Alexandra Moen, Eve Myles, Hattie Hayridge, Hugh Quarshie, Paul McGann, Nicholas Courtney, Peter Mayhew, Elijah Wood
17–18 July 2010	Earls Court 2	Mike Tyson, William Shatner, Sean Young, Kristanna Loken, Katee Sackhoff, Aidan Turner, Colin Teague, Elisabeth Sladen, Edi Gathegi, Tom Noonan, Gary Kurtz, Kenny Baker, Paul Kasey, Julian Glover, Matthew Lewi, Nia Roberts, Andrew Robinson, James Pax, David Nykl, Daniel Logan, Ben Browder, Virginia Hey, William B Davis, Nicholas Courtney, Ian Gelder, Bob Anderson, Terry Ackland-Snow, Matthew Waterhouse, Robert Rankin, Christopher Judge, Tracie Simpson, David Bailie, Gabriela Montaraz, Hannah Steele and Elizabeth Croft, Harry Fielder, Wendee Lee, Dante Basco, Tyson Houseman, Tom Morga, Leslie Hoffman
8–10 July 2011	Earls Court 2	Tom Sizemore, Christopher Lloyd, Corey Feldman, Cary-Hiroyuki Tagawa, Derek Jacobi, Robert Knepper, Karen Gillan, Sylvester McCoy, Mark Sheppard, Shawnee Smith, Clive Barker, Robert Rankin, Lisa Marie, Veronica Cartwright, Lea Thompson, Sophie Aldred, Camille Coduri, Natalia Tena, Georgina Leonidas, Simon Fisher-Becker, Sylvia Anderson, Louise Jameson, Nicholas Vince, Lee Ingleby, Mary Tamm, Jeffrey Weissman, Jess Harnell, Lee Townsend, Liam Shalloo, Michael Bailey Smith, Henry Davies, Jeremy Bulloch, Oliver Smith, Simon Bamford, Mela Lee, Brian Tochi, Richard Franklin, Peter Jurasik, Walter Koenig, Luciana Carro, Joel Gretsch, Sandahl Bergman, Stephen Furst, Ricky Dean Logan, John Chapman, John Simpkin, Holly McGuire, Kyla Cole, Monica Harris, Alex Kingston, Laurence Belcher
6–8 July 2012	Olympia Grand Hall	Karl Urban, Gillian Anderson, John Simm, Charles Dance, Freema Agyeman, Bernard Cribbins, Alex Winter, Hayden Panettiere, Jeri Ryan, Christopher Judge, Adam Baldwin, Jewel Staite, Arthur Cox, Craig Parker, Gates McFadden, Michael Winslow, Zach Galligan, Anthony Head, Michael Socha, Kate Bracken, Gwendoline Christie, Amrita Acharia, Rose Leslie, Ross Mullan, Eugene Simon, Iain Glen, John Bradley, Nonso Anozie, Ralph Ineson, Mickie James, Virgil, Brutus Magnus, Carole Ann Ford, Mitch Pileggi, Martin Kove, Ben Browder, Thomas Dekker, Holly Marie Combs, Brian Krause, Ben Mansfield, Ciaran McMenamin, Tom Skerritt, Nicolas Lee, Ke Huy Quan, Danielle Harris, Al Leong, Maryam d'Abo, Burt Kwouk, Jane Badler, Elizabeth Dennehy, Serena Delacruz, Robert Maschio, Janet Fielding, Barbara Coles, Tracee Cocco, Kevin Sorbo, Terry Richards, Hallie Todd, William Russell, Dave Prowse, Kenny Baker, Jeremy Bulloch, Seán Schemmel, Kieron Jecchinis, Anthony Smee, William Hoyland, Bai Ling
5–7 July 2013	Earls Court 2	Peter Dinklage, Danny Glover, Norman Reedus, David Hasselhoff, Clive Russell, Jason Momoa, Michael Shanks, Diamond Dallas Page, The Honky Tonk Man, D'Lo Brown, Colin Baker, Sylvester McCoy, Louise Jameson, Peter Purves, Peter Mayhew, Kenny Baker, Robert Rankin, James Brogden, Richard Dormer, Mark Lewis Jones, William B Davis, Amanda Tapping, Bruce Gray, Avery Brooks, Waris Hussein, Adrienne Barbeau, Angela Bruce, Ling Tai, Barry Jenner, Jennifer Calvert, Nicole Deboer, Hugh Walters, Jan Chappell, David Banks, Max Grodenchik, Jane How, Bobby Holland Hanton, Peter Kent, Caprice Rothe, Matthew De Meritt, Kim Darby, John Franklin, Courtney Gains, Salome Jens, Kristian Nairn
11–13 July 2014	Earls Court 2	Stan Lee, Carrie Fisher, Ian McDiarmid, John Hurt, Summer Glau, Milo Ventimiglia, Michael Madsen, Jenna Coleman, Jemma Redgrave, Paul McGann, Colin Baker, David Yost, Paul Schrier, Jason Narvy, George A. Romero, Michael Biehn, Dave Prowse, Lena Heady, Anthony Head, Juliet Landau, Terry Farrell, Helen Slater, Billy Dee Williams, Corey Dee Williams, Jamie Bamber, Edward James Olmos, Sibel Kekilli, Ellie Kendrick, Isaac Hempstead Wright, Gethin Anthony, Finn Jones, Jeff East, Stephanie Leonidas, Daniel Portman, Sarah Louise Madison, Kenny Baker, TJ Thyne, Jason Mewes, Jeremy Bulloch, Michael Ensign, Wendy Glenn, Bernard Cribbins, Al Snow, Garrick Hagon, David Wenham, Adam Brown, Tracey Eddon, David Collings, Dominic Keating, Belinda Mayne, Vincent Ward, Dean Mitchell, Femi Taylor, Tim Dry, Jeremy Borash, David Hewlett, Robert Knepper, William Russell, Mickie James, Daniel Kash, Curtis Armstrong, Ken Marshall, John Simpkin, Paul Freeman, Tom Chadbon, Paul Springer, Andy Herd, Jerome Blake, Gary Kurtz, Will Tudor, Peter Miles, Andrew Cartmel, Guy Siner, Kate Dickie, Jon Davey, Anneke Wills, Sarah Parish, Tyler Mane, Phil Herbert, Jose Pablo Cantillo, Sean Crawford, Robert Emms, Adjoa Andoh, Cowboy James Storm, Stephen J. Forrest-Smith, Robert Hays, Bambos Georgiou, Jane McNeill, Ian Beattie, Aiden Cook, Cerina Vincent, Kristian Nairn, Slavitza Jovan, Glenn Morshower, Rupert Vansittart, Dicken Ashworth, Trevor Martin, Philip Grieve, Casper Van Dien, Dina Meyer
17–19 July 2015	Olympia	Sigourney Weaver, Michael J. Fox, Richard Dean Anderson, Alan Flyng, Alan Harris, Alan Swaden, Alexander Siddig, Alice Krige, Arti Shah, Amazon Eve, Ben Champniss, Bill Hargreaves, Bill Paxton, Brad Greenquist, Carice Van Houten, Carrie Henn, Cameron Jebo, Catherine Tate, Christopher Benjamin, Christopher Lloyd, Claudia Wells, Clifton Collins Jr, Colette Hiller, Colin Baker, Daniel Portman, Darren Lynn Bousman, Dave Prowse, David Barclay, Derek Chafer, Derrick Sherwin, Donald Fullilove, Doug Robinson, Eileen Roberts, Elsa Gwilliam, Erik Bauersfeld, Erin Cahill, Finn Jones, Gareth David-Lloyd, Garrett Wang, Gemma Whelan, Gregg Henry, Harry Treadaway, Harry Waters Jr, Hayley Atwell, Iain Glen, Ian Liston, J. LaRose, Jack McKenzie, James Remar, Jamie Hill, James Tolkan, Jason David Frank, Jason Faunt, Jacqueline Kim, Jeffrey Weissman, Jessica Henwick, Jennifer Rubin, Jeremy Bulloch, Jim Dowdall, Joe "Animal" Laurinaitis, Jodi Lyn O'Keefe, John Bell, John Gomez, John Ratzenberger, John Morton, Julian Glover, Jonathan Pryce, Kenny Baker, Kelly Jo Minter, Kelly Hu, Keisha Castle-Hughes, Ken Colley, Ken Kirzinger, Kevin Eastman, Kit Hillier, Kristian Nairn, Lasse Wirdestedt, Lea Thompson, Leif Tilden, Len Bond, Luke Pasqualino, Marc McClure, Mark Capri, Marolyn Turk, Maimie McCoy, Marnix Van Den Broeke, Michael Gambon, Michelan Sisti, Michael Traynor, Naomi Grossman, Neve Campbell, Nick Palma, Nicole de Boer, Paul Jerricho, Peta-Maree Rixon, Peter Shinkoda, Reeve Carney, Ray Hassett, Ray Park, Rey Mysterio, Ricky Dean Logan, Robert Englund, Robert Kurtzman, Robert Rusler, Robert Watts, Rocky Johnson, Rose Leslie, Roy Scammell, Sean Gunn, Sherilyn Fenn, Simon Russell Beale, Steve Cardenas, Stephen Fitzalan, Stephen Calcutt, Steve Coulter, Tara Ward, Terry Sach, Terrence Mustoo, Tina Simmons, Tim Russ, Tim McInnerny, Trevor Butterfield, Trevor Steedman, Tom Burke, Tom Savini, Tom Walker, Tommy Weldin, William Forsythe, Dan Slott
29–31 July 2016	Olympia	Carl Weathers, Dolph Lundgren, Elden Henson, Famke Janssen, Ian McDiarmid, Jack Gleeson, Michelle Gomez, Jeremy Renner, Mads Mikkelsen, Michael Emerson, Aaron Stanford, Adam Copeland, Alan Austen, Alan Tompkins, Amir Arison, Anton Lesser, Blake Foster, Bonnie Langford, Catherine Sutherland, Caroline Blakiston, Colin Baker, Colt Cabana, Daniel Portman, Dave Prowse, David Field, Dixie Arnold, Dominic Monaghan, Donald Sumpter, Ellie Kendrick, Faye Marsay, Frazer Diamond, Frazer Hines, Gail Kim, Gary Kurtz, Gemma Whelan, Jim Duggan, Harold Perrineau, Hattie Hayridge, Hardcore Holly, Jamie Harris, Jamie Kennedy, Jason David Frank, Jasper Jacob, Jeremy Bulloch, Joe Naufahu, John Galvin, Johnny Yong Bosch, Jon Heder, Judge Reinhold, Julian Sands, Kae Alexander, Keith David, Kenny Baker, Kim Coates, Kjell Nilsson, Kristian Nairn, Laurie Holden, Mike Havord, Mike Stevens, Millie Bobby Brown, Nakia Burrise, Natalia Tena, Neil Kaplan, Paul McGann, Peter Mayhew, Pip Torrens, Quentine Pierre, Rex Smith, Richard Brake, Roberta Tovey, Rob Van Dam, Rutger Hauer, Sam Coleman, Sean Maher, Stephen Bayley, Steven Berkoff, Sylvester McCoy, Ted DiBiase, Tobin Bell, Vic Armstrong, Warwick Diamond, Wendy Leech
28–30 July 2017	Olympia	Benedict Cumberbatch, Natalie Dormer, Kevin Smith, Mads Mikkelsen, Pamela Anderson, Nicola Bryant, Sylvester McCoy, Richard Franklin, Matthew Waterhouse, Tom Wilson, Richard Dean Anderson, Wil Wheaton, Terence Stamp, David Labrava, Kenny Johnson, Emily Kinney, Adam Copeland, Alan Tudyk, Alexis Denisof, Alicia Witt, Alistair Petrie, Anthony Forrest, Andy de la Tour, Andrew Gray, Andrew Robinson, Alyson Hannigan, Benedict Wong, Bernard Cribbins, Carol Cleveland, Chris Durand, Christopher Judge, Christopher Lloyd, Christien Anholt, Colin Hunt, Conleth Hill, Daniel Portman, Danielle Tabor, David Bradley, David Labrava, David Morrissey, Dave Prowse, Deep Roy, Dean Cain, Dickey Beer, Emily Kinney, Finn Jones, Gemma Whelan, Ian McDiarmid, James Dodd, James & Oliver Phelps, Jeremy Bulloch, Jessica Henwick, Jimmy Vee, Joe Dinicol, John Carroll Lynch, John Cleese, John Leeson, Julian Glover, Kevin Kleinberg, Kristen Renton, Kristian Nairn, Lalla Ward, Louise Jameson, Mark Austin, Mark Boone Jr, Mark Strickson, Mark Sheppard, Martin Gordon, Michael Copon, Michelle Harrison, Michael Rosenbaum, Michael Madsen, Missi Pyle, Phil LaMarr, Peter Mayhew, Pilou Asbaek, Richard Cunningham, Robbi Morgan, Sacha Dhawan, Sarah Douglas, Selwyn Ward, Sean Biggerstaff, Steven Yeung, Lisa Varon, Tom Morga, Tom Skerritt, Tommy Flanagan, Tricia Helfer, Valene Kane, Veronica Cartwright, Wai Ching Hoo, Warwick Diamond, William Regal, Zoe Wanamaker, Marv Wolfman
27–29 July 2018	Olympia	Tom Baker, Peter Davison, Colin Baker, Paul McGann, Christopher Eccleston, David Tennant, Matt Smith, Peter Capaldi, Adrienne Barbeau, Aly Michalka, Amber Rose Revah, Angela Staines, Aiden Turner, Arthur Darvill, Barbara Coles, Billy Gunn, Bob Spiker, Bonnie Langford, Caroline Munro, Catherine Bach, Catherine Mary Stewart, Cerina Vincent, Costas Mandylor, Daniel Naprous, Daniel Gillies, Dave Barclay, David Duchovny, Devon Murray, Ellie Kendrick, Emily Carey, Eugene Brave Rock, Frank Henson, Gail Kim, Guy Siner, Harley Durst, Helen Atkinson Wood, Ingrid Oliver, Isaac Hempstead Wright, David Bradley, Ivana Milicevic, Ivy Wong, Iwan Rheon, Jack O'Hallorhan, James Caan, James Callis, Jason Momoa, Jeff Jarrett, Jeremy Bulloch, Jewel Staite, Jim Ross, Jimmy Vee, John Alexander, John Schneider, Johnny Whitworth, Julian Glover, Karlee Perez, Katie Leung, Ken Colley, Kevin Thompson, Kim Falkinberg, Kim Hartman, Lance Guest, Lance Henriksen, Mark Henry, Matt Zimmerman, Matthew Wood, Meat Loaf, Michael Culver, Mike Edmonds, Mike Quinn, Miranda Richardson, Nathalie Emmanuel, Nick Castle, Noel Clarke, Paige Turco, Paul Kaye, Paul Taylor, Paul Wesley, Pearl Mackie, Penny McCarthy, Peter Weller, Rahul Kohli, Ray Fisher, Ray Park, Richard Gibson, Richard Glover, Richard Wilson, Rory McCann, Rose McIver, Sabrina Gennarino, Sam Neill, Said Taghmaoui, Sarah Douglas, Staz Nair, Sean Young, Steven Seagal, Shauna MacDonald, Simon Williamson Tom Vaughan-Lawlor, Temirlan Blaev, Thomas Francis Murphy, Tom Welling, Tom Wopat, Vladimir Furdik, Steven Moffat, William Hope, Wes Chatham, Dan Slott, Sara Pichelli
26–28 July 2019	Olympia	Martin Sheen, Charlie Sheen, Zachary Quinto, Robert Carlyle, Hayden Christensen, Jason Momoa, Carrie-Anne Moss, Brendan Fraser, Tom Ellis, Val Kilmer, Jason Isaacs, Tom Felton, Ben Barnes, Christina Ricci, Gina Torres, Lana Parrilla, Emilie De Ravin, Karen David, Robert Patrick, Christopher Eccleston, Vladimir Furdik, Ian McDiarmid, Matthew Lillard, Lee Majors, William Shatner, Walter Koenig, Shazad Latif, William Zabka, Jacob Bertrand, Xolo Mariduena, Ian Somerhalder, John Barrowman, Alfie Allen, Jenna Coleman, Adam Baldwin, Gareth David-Lloyd, Lisa & Louise Burns, Michael Shanks, Billy Dee Williams, Erin Kellyman, Manu Bennett, Peter Serafinowicz, Finn Jones, Jeff Jarrett, Jessica Henwick, Sacha Dhawan, David Morrissey, Lennie James, Joe Thomas, Blake Harrison, David Naughton, Sean Biggerstaff, Devon Murray, Ethan Phillips, Nicole De Boer, Joe Flanigan, Ian Whyte, Julian Glover, Lourdes Faberes, Mike Carter, Gemma Whelan, Phil Daniels, Bernard Cribbins, Franco Nero, Sylvester McCoy, Daniel Mays, Colin Baker, Sophie Aldred, John Leeson, Jessie Cave, Rick Gonzalez, Kirk Acevedo, Rob Morgan, Corey Dee Williams, Curzon Dobell, Kailia Vernoff, Robert Picardo, Stephen Gevedon, Philip Zhao, Peter Purves, John Levine, John Simpkin, Rusty Goffe, CJ Graham, Annette Jones, Barbara Frankland, Tara Fitzgerald Robert Glenister, Kane Hodder, Hugh Quarshie, Jim Marlow, Leslie Easterbrook, Paul Blake, Nicola Bryant, Katie Purvis, Neil Ellis, James Jude Courtney, Martin Stephens, Lesley Scoble, Teri Scoble, Andy de la Tour, Jonathan Cohen, Rugero Deodato, Me Me Lai, Samuel Oatley, Quentin Pierre, Tony Allen, Derek Arnold, Tom Wilton, David Church, Syd Wragg, Steve Ismay, Alan Fernandes, Ross Beadman, Peter House, Anthony Cece, Guy Henry, Kerry Ingram, Andy Bradford, Pam Rose, Eileen Roberts, Ron Hone, Bill Westley, Peter Ross, Derek Chafer, John Cannon, Terry Francis, Vic Gallucci, Grant Hall, Francesca Ciardi, Nelson Hall, Aimee Garcia, Genevieve Gaunt, Jaime Hill, Alan Harris, Kelly Kelly, Rey Mysterio, Ted Dibiase, Al Snow, Rob Liefeld
19–21 November 2021. Returns after a 2-year hiatus due to the COVID-19 Pandemic	Olympia	Christopher Eccleston, George Takei, Robert Englund, Karen Allen, Mark Pellegrino, Ming-Na Wen, Brian Blessed, Julian Kostov, Julius LeFlore, Valene Kane, Beau Gadsdon, Dolly Gadsdon, Daniel Naprous, Mark Rolston, Jemma Redgrave, Jo Martin, Amanda Abbington, Sean Biggerstaff, Andrew Robinson, Rose Reynolds, Hannah Murray, Nick Frost, Ben Browder, Natalia Tena, Tom Skerrit, Riz Ahmed, Sacha Dhawan, Georgia Hirst, Kim Coates, Ray Hassett, Bernard Cribbins, Elizabeth Mitchell, Simon Palsey-Day, Jason O'Mara, Guy Henry, Simon McBurney, Ahsley Walters, Veronica Cartwright, John Wesley Shipp, Jessie T. Usher, Janet Fielding, Suzanne Bertish, Angus Wright, Milton Johns, Andrew Gower, Liam Garrigan, Anji Mohindra, Mark Boone Jr., Quentin Piere, Harry Manfredi, Lee Cornes, Clare Kramer, David Learner, Danielle Nicolet, Joe Gibson, Mat Fraser, Julian Holloway, Sam Humphrey, Mandeep Dhillon, Matthew Devitt, Emmy Raver-Lampman, Steven R. McQueen, Barry Bostwick, Ronn Millkie, Anna-Louise Plowman, Staz Nair, Marc Blucas, P. J. Black, Cinta de Oro, Jack McKenzie, Syd Wragg, Richard Brake, Jim Dowdall, Robert Patrick, Emily Kinney, Nick Blood, Maryam d'Abo, Bonnie Langford, Lance Henriksen, Tommy Knight, Lee Stringer, Jonathan Watson, Bernard Hill, Jimmy Vee, Tommy Flanagan, Jenna Coleman, Marina Sirtis, Kristanna Loken, Tim Dry, Sean Crawford, Joey Cramer, Andy Secombe, Sam Spruell, Rochenda Sandall
8–10 July 2022	Olympia	David Harbour, Arthur Darvill, Christopher Lloyd, Robert Englund, Stephen Amell, Katee Sackhoff, David Bradley, Micky Dolenz, Zoe Wanamaker, David Ramsey, Frances Lee McCain, Phillip Glenister, Robert Davi, Dorian Kingi, Omid Abtahi, Sophie Aldred, Claudia Wells, Julian Glover, Henry Thomas, Chris Barris, Ariana Richards, Dmitri Karas, Clarence Giljard Jr, Martin Shaw, Alex Kingston, Aiden Turner, Terry Francis, Terence Mustoo, Simon Kassiandis, Jennifer Lim, Donald Fullilove, Jeffrey Weissman, Gavin Conrad, Andrew Conrad, Janet Fielding, Steven Wickham, Royce Pierreson, Peter Purves, Ian Durrant, Les Conrad, Shirley Conrad, Paul Markham, Ted Western, Larry Estrin, Quentin Pierre, Alan Swaden, Richard Oldfield, Eric Roberts, Maureen O'Brien, Dawn Diniger, Billy Bryan, Yaya Han, Christine Galery, Doug Naylor, Tamara Carlson Woodard, Grand L. Bush, Jim Fye, Misty Rosas, Zach Galligan, Alfred Enoch, Chris Bartlett, Barbara Nedeljakova, Jana Kaderabkova, Garrick Hagon, Danielle Nicolet, Jim Dowdall, Hannah Murray, Devon Murray, Marc Blucas, Clare Kramer, Billy Hartman, Jimmy Vee, Henry Thomas, Robert MacNaughton, Dee Wallace, Patrick O'Kane, Amy Bailey, Sam Humphrey, Eric Walker, Ray Hasset, Susanna Malak, Syd Wragg, Julius LeFlore, Colin Baker, Sean Maguire, Rick Rossovich, Santiago Cabrera, Jeri Ryan, Joseph Quinn, Anthony Montgomery, Connor Trinneer, Robert O'Reilly, Tim Russ, Max Grodenchik, Andy Serkis, Kendo Nagasaki, Rick Rossovich,
7-9 July 2023	Olympia	Chuck Norris, Temuera Morrison, Dolph Lundgren, Danny Trejo, Clark Gregg, Grace Van Dien, Matt Smith, Mike Colter, Iain De Caestecker, David Wenham, Jessica Henwick, Cynthia Rothrock, Amanda Tapping, Dileep Rao, Scott Adkins, Natalia Tena, Carl Toop, Mason Dye, Carolina Munro, Martine Beswick, Craig David Dowsett, Madeline Smith, Sylvana Henriques, Oliver Watson, Carole Ashby, Alison Worth, Ingvlid Delia, Michael Brendon, Naomi J. Ogawa, Johnna Dias-Watson, Kenneth Cranham, Glynis Barber, Lawrence Monoson, Lochlyn Munro, Morgan Beale, Evie Allen, Brian Bovell, Shani Smethurst, Brendan Fletcher, Kyle Labine, George Georgiou, Adrian Lawrence, Gwyneth Strong, Robert Emms, Fred Sorenson, Daniel Weyman, Leo Ashton, Harvey Sadler, Leo Hart, Kirsten Baker, Colin Baker, Sylvester McCoy, Daniel Scott Smith, Michael Carter, Brian Croucher, Mike Edmonds, Ray Hassett, Quentin Pierre, Bruce Knight, Julie Sharp, Zac Cohen, Glynn Jones, Pamela Betts, Maureen Charlton, April Perkins, Katie Purvis, Michael Henbury, Andy Herd, Mike Stevens, Kamay Lau, Brian Wheeler, Willie Coppen, Eric Walken, Craig Stratton, Dan Slott, Eric Walker, Ray Hasset, Gary Erskine, Ramzee, Mike Collins
5-7 July 2024	Olympia	David Boreanaz, Rupert Grint, Denise Richards, Kevin Whately, Ray Winstone, Marina Sirtis, Hanna Alström, Lenny Rush, Natalia Tena, Michael Vu, Matthew Needham, Sophie Aldred, Patty Mullen, Nisha Nayar, Dani Harmer, Susan Twist, Jessie Cave, Afshan Azad, Jennifer Banko, Malcolm Weaver, Mark Patton, Mike Quinn, Greg Powell, Garrick Hagon, Nasser Memarzia, Kim Myers, Corinne Cléry, Beatrice Boepple, Chris Bartlett, Dame Siân Phillips, Samantha Scaffidi, Brett Wagner, Lee Ingleby, Whit Hertford, Clare Higgins, Maureen O'Brien, Devon Murray, Julian Glover, Colin Baker, Alex Armbruster, Max Laferriere, Sylvester McCoy, Peter Purves, Josie Sedgwick-Davies, Anton Valensi, Tracey Eddon, Wayne Michaels, Kyle Strauts, Rissa Kilar, Marti Matulis, Ming Qiu, Danielle Xin Yao Waterman, Sheila Reid, Madelyn Most, Jonathan Cass, Peter MacDonald, Ronnie Le Drew, Nick Owenford, Phil Herbert, Ron Street, Paul Springer, Aly Fell, Nigel Parkinson, Yel Zamor, William Potter, David Leach, Kit Buss, Simon Bisley, Rachael Smith, Shelly Bond, Philip Bond, Staz Johnson, Jack Lawrence, Rob Williams, Pau Scorpi, Prentis Rollins, CGC Comic Grading, Imogen Mangle, Stu MacKay, Chris Geary, Hamish Steele, Mike Collins, Cam Smith, Ant Williams, Emma Vieceli, Mark Buckingham, Stephen Baskerville, Danny Earls, Gary Erskine, Ellie Wright, Simon Furman, Andy Lanning, Tony Lee, Ian Richardson, Peter Hogan, Lew Stringer, Pye Parr, Marc Laming, Geoff Senior, Robert Rankin, Lee Bradley, Kit Cox, Georges Jeanty, Guillermo Ortego, Irma Page, Lee Townsend, Sonia Leong, Kev F. Sutherland, Andrew Cartmel, The Jack Kirby Museum, Rich Johnston, Steve Tanner, Andrew Sawyers, Dave West, Martin Stiff, Time Bomb Comics, The '77, Steve McManus, Ram V, Des Taylor, Will Robson, Jessica Martin, John Charles, Mike Carey, Paul Cornell, Allornothingcosplay, Eeloftheworld
5-6 July 2025	Olympia	Mel Gibson, Pom Klementieff, Carla Gugino, Ron Perlman, Varada Sethu, Dominique McElligott, John Barrowman, Brian Blessed, Danny Glover, Tommy Flanagan, Gates McFadden, Faye Marsay, James Cosmo, Craig Charles, Brendan Wayne, Lateef Crowder dos Santos, Marina Sirtis, Robert Llewellyn, Jeryl Prescott, Sean Young, Virginia Hey, Megan Burns, Chris Barrie, Danny John-Jules, Nick Blood, Robert Timothy Smith, Ragga Ragnars, David Bradley, Ariyon Bakare, Anita Dobson, Alex Ferns, Angus Neill, James Robinson, David Costabile, Corey Johnson, Stefan Kalipha, Mark Burnham, Chris Durand, Tom Morga, Alex Norton, Kevin O'Brien, Gabby Wong, Michael Berryman, Sophie Thompson, Michael Swan, Roxanne McKee, David Katims, Tanya Moodie, Ben Mansfield, Ekow Quartey, Isabella Laughland, Debra S Hayes, Ladislav Beran, Anthony Higgins, Anna Shaffer, Cinzia Monreale, Lu Junchang, Amrita Acharia, Ming Qiu, Ellen Thomas, Robert Strange, Daniel Weyman, Chris Rankin, Hattie Hayridge, Colin Baker, Stuart Milligan, Katy Manning, Jamie Foreman, Mirella D'Angelo, Steph de Whalley, Anna Brewster, Julian Glover, Sylvester McCoy, Steph Lacey, Dan Starkey, Bronte Barbe, Samir Arran, Chase Brown, Garrick Hagon, Phil Baxter, Anita Harris, Jacki Piper, Stephen Bayley, Ronnie Le Drew, Callan Taverner, Richard Price, Derek Chafer, Paul Bannon, Larry Estrin, Dylan Teague, Ian Ritchardson, Kit Cox, Matt Hardy, Neil Gibson, Olivia Sullivan, Irma Page, Ian Edginton, Dan Mumford, Wiktoria Radkiewicz, Shift Magazine, Glenn Fabry, Michael Golden, Renée Witterstaetter, Stephen Baskerville, Ant Williams, Tony Lee, Alex Paknadel, Tripwire Magazine, Peter Western, Rich Johnston, Jo Heeley, Steve Bull, Steve MacManus, The '77, Jessica Martin, Jack Kirby Museum, Lew Stringer, Kit Buss, Mike Carey, Lee Townsend, CGC Comic Grading, Mike Collins, Geoff Senior, Colleen Douglas, Andrew Cartmel, Aly Fell, Simon Furman, Andrew Thomas, Sam Hart, Roger Langridge, Steve Tanner, Des Taylor, Pau Scorpi, James Gray, Dave West, Time Bomb Comics, Benjamin Dickson, Sean Mason, Will Brooks, Stephen Wyatt, Martin Geraghty, Cutaway Comics, Esad Ribic, Adi Granov, Laura Braga, Rachael Smith, Ellie Wright, Marco Santucci, Maria Laura Sanapo, Guillermo Ortego, Gary Erskine, Frazer Irving, Nigel Parkinson, Andrew Wildman, Lee Bradley, Prentis Rollins, Sonia Leong, Chris Geary, Jack Lawrence, David Leach, Patricia Martin, Rantz Hoseley, Simon Bisley, Z2 Comics, Lee Sullivan, Valentina Graziuso, Ralph Horsley, Karl Jones, Duncan Gutteridge, Alice Pisoni, Nick Gribbon, Valerio Buonfantino, Benjamin Paulus, Steve White, Mai Cosplay, Eel of the world
13-14 June 2026 (Cancelled)	Olympia	Neve McIntosh, Jerry Wallace, Colin Baker, Catrin Stewart, Dan Starkey, Garrick Hagon, Montanna Thompson, Bronson Webb, Carl Parker, Eric MacLennan, Martine Beswick, Ant Williams, Guillermo Ortego, Eren Angiolini, John McCrea, Ellie Wright, Mike Collins, Jessica Martin, Roger Langridge, Simon Furman, Colleen Douglas, Glenn Fabry
14-15 August 2027	Olympia	

== See also ==
- AUKcon
- Caption (comics convention)
- Eastercon
- EGX (expo)
- Fandom
- For the Love of Sci-Fi
- Hyper Japan
- List of multigenre conventions
- London Super Comic Convention
- Memorabilia (event)
- MCM London Comic Con
- Microcon
- Thought Bubble Festival
- United Kingdom Comic Art Convention
- UK Games Expo
