= Maura Higgins =

Irish television personality (born 1990)

- Higgins in 2024
- Born: Maura Higgins; 25 November 1990 (age 35); Ballymahon, County Longford, Ireland
- Occupations: Television personality; model; presenter
- Years active: 2017–present
- Television: Love Island; Dancing on Ice; This Morning; Glow Up; Cooking with the Stars; Love Island USA: Aftersun; I'm a Celebrity...Get Me Out of Here!; Love Island Games Aftersun; The Traitors (US); Dancing with the Stars (US)

Maura Higgins (born 25 November 1990) is an Irish television personality, presenter and model. She rose to prominence in 2019, when she was a finalist on the fifth series of ITV2 reality series Love Island. Since then, Higgins has collaborated with numerous fashion and makeup brands and went on to present the Irish version of the reality television competition Glow Up. She has also appeared as a contestant on Dancing on Ice (2020), Cooking with the Stars (2022) I'm a Celebrity...Get Me Out of Here! (2024), as well as The Traitors US and Dancing with the Stars (2026). She was the social media presenter for Love Island USA and Love Island Games (2023), before going on to present Love Island USA: Aftersun (2024 and 2025) and Love Island Games: Aftersun (2025).

== Early life ==
Maura Higgins was born on 25 November 1990 in Forgney, Ballymahon, County Longford to Sharon and Seamus Higgins. She has two sisters and a brother. A former pupil of Forgney N.S, she then attended Ballymahon Vocational School. After leaving school she went on to study hairdressing in Athlone, before working at a salon in her home town.

== Career ==
=== Modelling and promotions ===
Prior to appearing on television, Higgins worked as a grid girl and appeared in numerous modelling campaigns. In 2014, she began working for Monster Energy. At the end of 2017, as a Monster girl, she travelled to Abu Dhabi for the Formula 1 finale and in 2018, she went viral with a video of her drifting a car for Monster Energy in Abu Dhabi to inspire women there to drive. In 2017, Higgins appeared in the visuals of Liam Payne's hit song "Get Low". In 2019, she worked as a ring girl for several professional boxers, including Anthony Joshua. In August 2019, she launched her first collection of luxury tan with Bellamianta, which was followed by a second collection in 2021. In October 2019, Higgins launched a clothing collection with Boohoo.com and regularly hosted their first ever podcast called "Get the Scoop". In November 2019, Higgins launched her first lingerie collection with Ann Summers and has since done several collections.

In April 2020, Higgins launched a 15-piece shoe and bag collection with EGO shoes, where she did a video shoot in Dubai for a TV-commercial. In June 2020, she launched a 34-piece makeup collection with Inglot Cosmetics. In September 2020, Higgins collaborated with Just Eat to promote Greggs being delivered via roller skates in the UK. In December 2020, Higgins launched her own False eyelashes brand called "False Flutters" exclusively to Primark. In November 2021, It was announced that Higgins signed with Elite Model Management in order to further her modelling career. In November 2022, Higgins paired up with Kim Kardashian's make-up artist Mario Dedivanovic for a series of videos and reels for Social media promoting his new range of make-up products. In January 2025, Higgins became the face of MAC Cosmetics UK and Ireland, fronting their new make-up campaign called "I Only Wear MAC".

=== Television ===
In June 2019, Higgins entered the Love Island villa for its fifth series. She entered the villa on Day 10 as a bombshell, reaching the final alongside Curtis Pritchard and finishing in fourth place. After leaving the villa, she began appearing regularly on This Morning, presenting an agony aunt segment. She also presented a two part series called "Maura's Ireland", which saw her travelling around Ireland showcasing the beauty of Ireland. In January 2020, Higgins won "TV Personality of the Year" at The Gossies Awards, held by Goss.ie. She was then announced as the red carpet host for The National Television Awards and was a guest panellist on Love Island: Aftersun. In the same month, Higgins was a contestant on the twelfth series of Dancing on Ice partnered with Alexander Demetriou. She was eliminated in week 7 after losing the skate-off to Libby Clegg. In July 2020, Higgins fronted her own show on ITV2 titled Maura Higgins: You're Joking Me!. She was a guest panellist on Loose Women. Her other television appearances include on The Late Late Show in Ireland and Jeremy Vine. She has also appeared on several celebrity game shows including Supermarket Sweep, Alan Carr's Epic Gameshow, Celebrity Juice, I'll Get This and The Wheel.

In September 2021, it was announced that Higgins would be presenting the Irish version of Glow Up: Britain's Next Make-Up Star. In April 2022, Higgins won "Best Female TV Presenter" and "Most Stylish Lady" at The Gossies Awards held by Goss.ie. The same year, Higgins was a contestant on the second series of Cooking with the Stars. She reached the semi-final and was the fifth celebrity to be eliminated, finishing in fourth place overall. In October 2022, she appeared in an episode of Shopping with Keith Lemon. In July 2023, Higgins was announced as social media presenter for the fifth series of Love Island USA. She also appeared on the show to guest host a challenge. In September 2023, Higgins announced that she was set to make acting debut in a film titled The Spin, written by Colin Broderick, directed by Michael Head and produced by Edward McCaffrey, in which she portrays a character named Rose. It was filmed in Northern Ireland and was scheduled for release in 2025. In 2024, The Spin film won Best Irish Feature Film Award at Dublin International Film Festival. It has also won Best Feature Film at Istanbul International Film Festival. The film is scheduled to premiere in cinemas from October 2025. October 2023, Higgins was announced as the social media presenter for Love Island Games, a global spin-off show, which saw her guest present three episodes. In 2024, Higgins began presenting Love Island USA: Aftersun and also guest presented two episodes of the main show during the sixth season. In November 2024, Higgins was a late arrival in the twenty-fourth series of I'm a Celebrity...Get Me Out of Here!. She joined camp on Day 5 alongside Rev. Richard Coles. Higgins was the sixth celebrity to be voted out of the camp on 5 December, in a double elimination alongside Barry McGuigan, ultimately finishing in seventh place. In June 2025, she was confirmed for the fourth season of The Traitors US, ultimately finishing as the runner-up to winner Rob Rausch. In April 2026, Higgins was the first contestant announced for the thirty-fifth season of the American dance competition series Dancing with the Stars at the Hulu Get Real House event. She was paired with professional dancer Mark Ballas, whom she appeared alongside on The Traitors. In August 2026, Higgins was confirmed as presenter for the reboot of Blind Date for Disney+ with filming to take place in late 2026. In September 2026, Peacock announced Higgins as the new co-host of the I'm a Celebrity...Get Me Out of Here! reboot, retitled Get Me Out of Here!, alongside Rausch.

== Personal life ==
Higgins resides in Essex, having moved there in 2020 whilst training for Dancing on Ice. In October 2024, she confirmed she purchased her dream home there.

In late 2019, Higgins briefly dated Curtis Pritchard, after reaching the final of Love Island together. She announced the breakup early March 2020. Higgins was previously in a relationship with Strictly Come Dancing professional Giovanni Pernice. The relationship ended in October 2021. Between 2023 and 2024, Higgins was in a relationship with Chris Hemsworth's stunt double Bobby Holland Hanton.

== Filmography ==
=== Film ===
Key
†	Denotes films that have not yet been released

Film roles
Year	Title	Role	Notes	Ref.
2026	The Spin	Rose	Irish comedy	

=== Television ===
Key
†	Denotes television productions that have not yet been released

As herself
Year	Title	Role	Notes	Ref.
2019	Love Island	Contestant	Series 5; finalist	
2019	This Morning	Agony aunt	Segments	
2019	This Morning	Presenter	2 episodes	
2019	Supermarket Sweep	Special guest	Cameo	
2019	Jeremy Vine	Guest panelist	1 episode	
2019	The Late Late Show	Guest	Irish talk show	
2019	Celebrity Juice	Guest panelist	Series 22; episode 3	
2019	Love Island: Aftersun	Guest panelist	Spin-off	
2019	Loose Women	Guest panelist	2 episodes	
2020	Love Island: What Happened Next?	Herself	Series 1; Episode 3	
2020	Dancing on Ice	Contestant	Series 12; 6th place	
2020	Maura Higgins: You're Joking Me!	Herself	Main role	
2020	I'll Get This	Herself	Christmas special	
2020	The Wheel	Celebrity expert	Series 1; Episode 3	
2020	Alan Carr's Epic Gameshow	Herself	Celebrity special	
2021	Glow Up	Presenter	Irish version; 8 episodes	
2021	On Yer Bike	Herself	Charity cycling series	
2022	Cooking with the Stars	Contestant	Series 2; Semi-finalist	
2022	Shopping with Keith Lemon	Herself	Series 3; Episode 8	
2023	The Late Late Show	Herself	Valentines special; Christmas special	
2023–2025	Love Island USA	Social presenter	Season 5–Season 6	
2023–2025	Love Island USA	Aftersun presenter	Season 6; Season 7	
2023–2025	Love Island Games	Social presenter	Season 1	
2023–2025	Love Island Games	Aftersun presenter	Season 2	
2024	I'm a Celebrity...Get Me Out of Here!	Contestant	Series 24	
2026	The Traitors US	Contestant	Season 4; episodes 1-11 (Runner-up)	
2026	The Drew Barrymore Show	Herself	Season 6; episode 177	
2026	Watch What Happens Live with Andy Cohen	Herself	Interview	
2026	Dancing with the Stars	Contestant	Season 35	
2027	Blind Date †	Presenter	Reboot for Disney+	
2027	Get Me Out of Here! †	Presenter	Reboot for Peacock	

== Awards and nominations ==
Year	Award	Category	Work	Result	Ref.
2020	Gossies Awards	Television Personality of the Year	Love Island	Won	
2020	VIP Style Awards	Most Stylish Newcomer	—N/a	Nominated	
2021	Extra.ie	Irelands top Influencer	Social media	First place	
2022	VIP Style Awards	Most Stylish Woman	—N/a	Nominated	
2022	Gossies Awards	Best Female TV Presenter	Glow Up	Won	
2022	Gossies Awards	Most Stylish Lady	—N/a	Won	
2024	Gossies Awards	Most Stylish Lady	—N/a	Nominated	
2025	Gossies Awards	Best Female TV Presenter	Love Island USA: Aftersun	Nominated	
2025	TRIC Awards	Social Media Broadcaster	Social media	Longlisted	
2025	National Television Awards	Reality-competition	I'm a Celebrity...Get Me Out of Here!	Won	
2026	Gossies Awards	Most Stylish Lady	—N/a	Nominated	

== Discography ==
Higgins appeared in the visuals of the hit song Get Low by Liam Payne (with Zedd).
Year	Title	Artist(s)	Album	Ref.
2017	Get Low	Zedd and Liam Payne	LP1 (Liam Payne album)	
2026	"How the Fire Started"	Eric Nam	Single	
