= Cultural consumer =

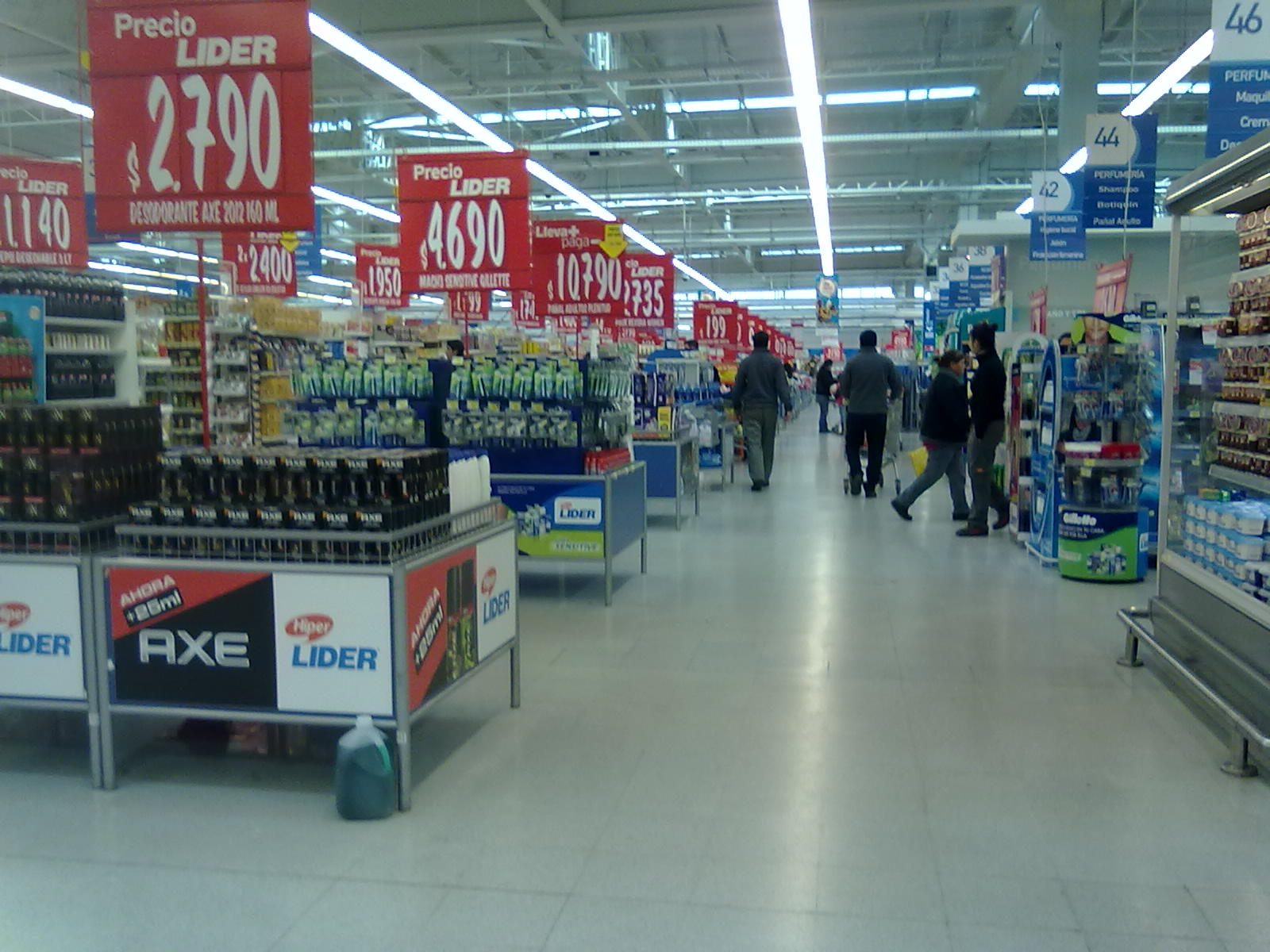
Same image for same subject in different languages

The cultural consumer describes a person who avidly consumes art, books, music, and live cultural events within a society. With the rise of expressive technologies, cultural consumers have harnessed the Internet to fuel their own creative efforts. The term was coined by author Patricia Martin in her book, The Rise of the Cultural Consumer and What It Means For Your Business, in which she suggests that the convergence of art, technology and entertainment is remaking the American consumer.

This new type of consumer values creativity, design and the power of personal values. These consumers will look toward companies that can "present an offering that solves a problem, does some good, and delivers aesthetically". They also look for products that engage the senses as a way to discern truth. In other words, they believe what they can experience. Authenticity is paramount, and stories and images are powerful means for communicating messages.

Although cultural consumers may have once represented a small segment of the population, this group is rapidly expanding through access to technology and the Internet. Recent research indicates that these consumers are connected, active in their communities, and creative. Additionally, they "aspire to be viewed as thinking, expressive human beings rather than mass market targets."
