= Patricia Gibson-Howell =

British actress

Patricia Gibson-Howell (born 1966) is a British actress of stage and screen.

Her television roles include Rosie McConkey in Doctors, Sue Perkins in Casualty and Patricia Truscott in Vote for Laurence, she has also appeared on The Bill.

Gibson-Howell trained at the Academy Drama School, where she was the recipient of the Stage Scholarship.
