= I'll Get This =

- Also known as: I'll Get This Extra Helping
- Genre: Comedy game show
- Directed by: Marcus Liversedge
- Country of origin: United Kingdom
- Original language: English
- No. of series: 2
- No. of episodes: 13 (list of episodes)

Production
- Executive producers: Paul McGettigan; Zoe Tait; Matt Walton
- Producers: Breid McLoone; John Lomax
- Running time: 30 minutes (series 1); 35 minutes (Dragons' Den special); 45 minutes (Extra Helping)
- Production company: 12 Yard Productions

Original release
- Network: BBC Two
- Release: 6 November 2018 – 12 May 2020

I'll Get This is a British television comedy game show produced by 12 Yard Productions for the BBC. The first episode was broadcast on BBC Two on 6 November 2018. The format features five celebrities dining together, with each placing their bank card in the middle of the table. They play a series of games; the winner of each game retrieves their card, and the celebrity whose card remains at the end pays the bill for the entire group.

The show was originally shown in 30-minute shows, with 45 minute extended shows entitled I'll Get This Extra Helping shown at a later date, however, beginning with the second series, all episodes were broadcast in the extended Extra Helping format.

== Transmissions ==
=== Series ===
Series	Start date	End date	Episodes
1	6 November 2018	11 December 2018	6
2	14 April 2020	12 May 2020	5

=== Specials ===
Year	Start date	End date	Episodes
2019	15 November 2019	19 December 2019	2

== Series overview ==
The order shows when each celebrity got to retrieve their card, with the celebrity in Bold paying the bill.

=== Series 1 (2018) ===
Episode	First broadcast	Celebrities
01x01	6 November 2018; 23 June 2019 (Extra Helping)	Carol Vorderman, Anton du Beke, Rylan Clark-Neal, Ellie Taylor and **Ed Gamble (£589)**
01x02	13 November 2018; 9 June 2019 (Extra Helping)	Chris Kamara, Tom Davis, Julian Clary, Rachel Johnson and **Laura Whitmore (£627)**
01x03	20 November 2018; 16 June 2019 (Extra Helping)	Angela Scanlon, Adil Ray, Janet Street-Porter, Scarlett Moffatt and **Griff Rhys Jones (£515·87)**
01x04	27 November 2018; 12 May 2019 (Extra Helping)	Martin Kemp, Rob Beckett, Harry Redknapp, Victoria Coren Mitchell and **Joanna Scanlan (£521)**
01x05	4 December 2018; 25 May 2019 (Extra Helping)	Holly Walsh, Josh Widdicombe, Adrian Chiles, Melvin Odoom and **Gemma Collins (£655)**
01x06	11 December 2018; 19 May 2019 (Extra Helping)	Steph McGovern, Russell Kane, Dotty, Steve Pemberton and **Richard Madeley (£958)**

=== Specials (2019) ===
Episode	First broadcast	Celebrities
Sx01	15 November 2019	Peter Jones (£5,000), Sara Davies (£5,000), Sarah Willingham (£5,000) and Tej Lalvani (£5,000), **Touker Suleyman** (£5,000)
Sx02	19 December 2019; 24 December 2019 (Extra Helping)	Gregg Wallace, Les Dennis, Maura Higgins, Shirley Ballas and **Joel Dommett (£752)**

=== Series 2 (2020) ===
Episode	First broadcast	Celebrities
02x01	14 April 2020	Anita Rani, Gabby Logan, Rachel Parris, Mark Wright and **Jonathan Ross (£625)**
02x02	21 April 2020	Nicola Coughlan, Jermaine Jenas, Kelly Osbourne, Ade Edmondson and **Sara Pascoe (£412)**
02x03	28 April 2020	Joe Sugg, Eamonn Holmes, Alice Levine, Stacey Solomon and **Phil Wang (£545)**
02x04	5 May 2020	Sally Lindsay, Nigel Havers, Desiree Burch, Georgia Toffolo and **Alex Brooker (£491)**
02x05	12 May 2020	Fleur East, Sue Perkins, Mike Tindall, John Barnes and **Johnny Vegas (£760)**
