= Amanda Foster =

British stunt actress

Amanda Foster (born 18 March 1967) is a British stunt actress. Foster was accepted to the UK stunt register in 1997 (latterly known as The British Stunt Register), and was the first black British woman to become a stunt double.

== Early life ==
Foster worked as a part-time physical education teacher while bringing up three children. She performed as an actress and an extra in several stage and film productions. While working as an extra on Patriot Games, she found out that there were no black female stunt actresses in the UK. She trained for six years and was accepted on the stunt register in six disciplines. She qualified in 1997.

== Career ==
Foster won the 2003 Taurus World Stunt Award for her work on Die Another Day.

Foster has performed in well-known films, including the Harry Potter series, The Da Vinci Code, and Johnny English.

== Filmography ==
Year	Title	Role	Notes
2002	Die Another Day	Halle Berry's body double	
2004	Ella Enchanted		
2009	Ninja Assassin		
2013	World War Z		
