= Paul (play) =

- Original language: English
- Written by: Howard Brenton
- Subject: Life of Paul the Apostle
- Setting: 1st century Judaea

Premiere
- Date: 30 September 2005
- Place: National Theatre, London
- Official website

Paul is a 2005 play by Howard Brenton, which portrays the life and career of Paul the Apostle. It was first performed in the Cottesloe auditorium of the National Theatre, London from 30 September 2005 – 4 February 2006, in modern dress.

The play portrays Jesus as having survived the Crucifixion, and his appearance to Paul outside Damascus as a chance encounter engineered by his wife Mary Magdalene and Peter, rather than the vision which Paul takes it to be.

The press night was postponed due to the exhaustion of Paul Rhys and his replacement by Adam Godley, while the National received 200 letters of complaint even before opening night.

== Cast ==
Cast and crew of the first production:

=== Crew ===
- Director - Howard Davies
- Designer - Vicki Mortimer
- Lighting Designer - Paule Constable
- Music - Dominic Muldowney
- Sound Designer - John Leonard

=== Cast ===
- Mary Magdalene - Kellie Bright
- Nero - Richard Dillane
- Ensemble - Tas Emiabata and Eugene Washington
- Paul - Paul Rhys / Adam Godley
- James - Paul Higgins
- Roman Gaoler - Dermot Kerrigan
- Peter - Lloyd Owen
- Yeshua (Jesus) - Pearce Quigley
- Arab Trader - Howard Saddler
- Barnabas - Colin Tierney
