= Chris Tordoff =

Irish comedian, actor, and writer

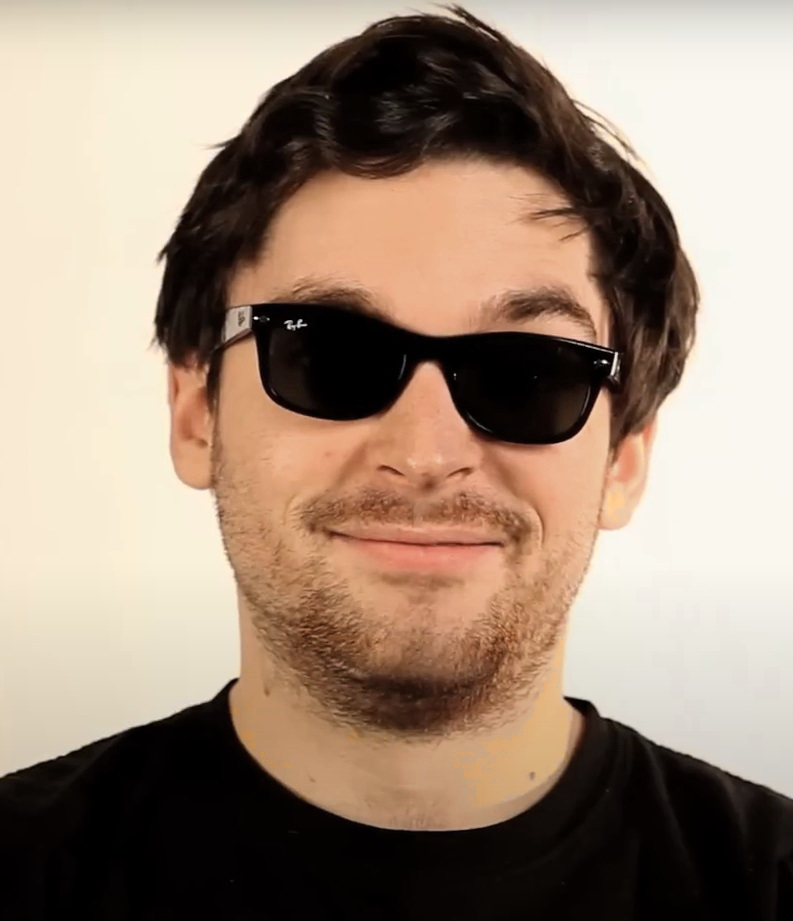
- Tordoff at JDIFF 2013
- Born: 7 October 1985 (age 40); Dunboyne, County Meath
- Occupations: Comedian, actor, writer, YouTuber, streamer
- Years active: 2009–present

Chris Tordoff is an Irish comedian, actor, writer, YouTuber, and streamer. He is best known for co-creating the RTÉ mockumentary series Hardy Bucks, in which he played bungling drug dealer Francis "The Viper" Higgins in the first four seasons. He has reprised the role in other media, such as The Hardy Bucks Movie, the comedy series Republic of Telly and Viper's View, and on his own YouTube and Twitch channels.

== Life and work ==
Tordoff was born on October 7, 1985, and moved from Leeds to the Irish town of Swinford, his mother's birthplace, in his early teens. There he met Martin Maloney, who had moved from Liverpool the year earlier. In 2009, the pair co-created Hardy Bucks as a web series on YouTube. Tordoff co-wrote, directed, and starred in it as antagonist Francis "The Viper" Higgins, a small-time drug dealer. Later that year, it won RTÉ Television's Storyland competition, and was commissioned as a series for television. For the second series, Liz Gill took over directorial duties from Tordoff. He reprised the role of the Viper in the 2013 film based on the series, The Hardy Bucks Movie. He was also a guest on Republic of Telly on RTÉ.

Tordoff later began creating online comedy on his own YouTube channel, under the name Francis Higgins. One series, World News, was a parodical news show inspired by a segment on Euronews called No Comment. Tordoff used clips from No Comment to produce his own videos, but was threatened with legal action by Euronews in 2016. This led to Tordoff being commissioned by RT UK to produce 50 episodes of Viper's View, as an insert for Sam Delaney's News Thing. In October 2016, Tordoff was nominated for an IFTA in the Best Male Performance category for his role as Francis Higgins.

Since 2019, Tordoff has regularly streamed video games on his YouTube channel, playing them in character either as Francis Higgins, Tommy Shlug (a bus driver from the west of Ireland and Francis Higgins' uncle, who also has a rare condition which at times makes him appear to lack any nasal features), Conor Williams (a D4-based sales executive for Mercedes Ireland), or Fontaine (a gritty New York detective) among others.

== Filmography ==
=== Film ===
Year	Title	Role	Notes
2013	The Hardy Bucks Movie	Francis "The Viper" Higgins	
2016	Digs for Pennies	Matty Gandon	Short film

=== Television ===
Year	Title	Role	Notes
2010–2018	Hardy Bucks	Francis "The Viper" Higgins	20 episodes Also director and writer
2011–2016	The Republic of Telly	Donnie's Irish Cousin; Francis "The Viper" Higgins	50 episodes
