= The Hardy Bucks Movie =

- Theatrical release poster
- Directed by: Mike Cockayne
- Written by: Mike Cockayne; Gerry Greaney
- Produced by: Mike Cockayne
- Starring: Martin Maloney; Chris Tordoff; Owen Colgan; Peter Cassidy; Tom Kilgallon; Michael Salmon
- Cinematography: Rob Arrowsmith
- Edited by: Mike Cockayne
- Music by: Mike Skinner
- Production company: Hardy Films
- Distributed by: Universal Pictures
- Release date: 13 February 2013
- Running time: 89 minutes
- Country: Ireland
- Language: English
- Budget: €320,000
- Box office: €500,000

The Hardy Bucks Movie is a 2013 Irish comedy film based on the RTÉ Two sitcom Hardy Bucks, directed by Mike Cockayne. The film follows the characters from the TV series, a group of Irish slackers who travel to Poland to follow the Republic of Ireland team at UEFA Euro 2012. It stars Martin Maloney, Chris Tordoff, Owen Colgan, Peter Cassidy, Tom Kilgallon, and Michael Salmon. The Hardy Bucks Movie was released on 13 February 2013 to favourable reviews, and was a box office success in Ireland.

== Plot ==
The "Hardy Bucks" gang travel to Poland to see the Republic of Ireland team compete at UEFA Euro 2012. Along the journey they encounter Dutch gangsters and prostitutes.

== Release ==
=== Box office ===
The Hardy Bucks Movie was a box-office success in Ireland, grossing €176,887 on its opening weekend and earning €500,000 in total, much more than its €320,000 budget.

=== Critical reception ===
The Hardy Bucks Movie was well received by most critics. Joe.ie observed "While the TV series was certainly funny, there was a certain air of censorship that comes with having a show with the national broadcaster. Thankfully, the movie has edges far sharper than its TV incarnation."

== See also ==
- List of Irish films
