= Tara Lynne O'Neill =

Northern Irish actress (born 1975)

- Born: Lynne James; 16 November 1975 (age 50); Belfast, Northern Ireland
- Other name: Tara O'Neill
- Occupation: Actress
- Years active: 1985–present

Tara Lynne O'Neill (born 18 September 1975) is an actress from Northern Ireland, who has appeared in film, theatre and television.

== Early life ==
During her childhood, she aspired to become a dentist, but abandoned this after failing her GCSE in chemistry. At sixth-form college, she opted for a career in acting.

== Career ==
=== Film and television ===
O'Neill started work as a television presenter on Saturday Disney from 1993 to 1996. She was also a main presenter on The Over the Wall Gang, a young people's television show from BBC Northern Ireland.

O'Neill also appeared in film roles such as the town's seductress in The Most Fertile Man in Ireland (1999), and as Claire McKee in Wild About Harry (2000). She later played Joanne Ryan in EastEnders, appearing in 58 episodes between 20 September 2002, and 21 August 2003.

Between 2013 and 2016, she appeared in The Fall. In 2018, she joined the main cast of Derry Girls as Mary Quinn, remaining on the show until the airing of the final episode on 18 May 2022. In April 2024, O'Neill was cast as Inspector Eve Dunlop in BBC's Hope Street for the show's fourth series. In 2025, she appeared in the Irish comedy film The Spin.

Her other roles include The Informant (1997), Disco Pigs (2001), Full Circle and Omagh (2004).

=== Stage ===
In addition to television and film, at the age of 19, she appeared on stage at the Grand Opera House in Belfast as Sandy in a production of the musical Grease.

In 2006, O'Neill appeared as Rita in a theatre production of Educating Rita staged at the Lyric Theatre in Belfast.

In 2021, she wrote and starred in Rough Girls, a play about women's football in Belfast in 1917–21; it was aired on BBC Four in 2022.
