= Owen Colgan =

Irish actor and comedian

- Born: County Mayo, Ireland
- Education: Calasanctius College
- Occupations: Actor and stand-up comedian
- Years active: 2005–present
- Known for: Hardy Bucks

Owen Colgan is an Irish actor and stand-up comedian from County Mayo.

== Early life and education ==
Colgan grew up on a farm in County Mayo. He went to college in Galway and studied nutrition at Calasanctius College.

== Career ==
Colgan began acting in 2009. In 2010, he appeared as 'Buzz' in the RTÉ comedy series Hardy Bucks. Colgan portrayed the character from 2010-2018. He also appeared in The Hardy Bucks Movie. In 2025, he appeared in The Spin. In 2020, he released a talk show titled Owen Colgan around the Fire on RTÉ Player. In 2026, Colgan confirmed that Hardy Bucks was returning.

Colgan began working as a comedian in 2005. He moved to Dublin with his girlfriend and said he "started to fall out of love with comedy" because of the pressure. He did a stand up tour in Northern Ireland in 2024 and performed in the Hill Comedy Club in Tipperary in 2026. In 2019, he performed his comedy show On the Dry at the black box theatre in Galway. In 2020, he brought the show to Castlederg. In 2021, he did a show in Limerick

In 2017, Colgan made a post, mocking a picture posted by Conor McGregor where McGregor is standing on a rented car. Colgan took a photo of himself standing on his car and said "When you own one Conor you can stand on it". McGregor never responded.

== Filmography ==
- 2009: RTE Storyland as Buzz McDonnall
- 2010-2018: Hardy Bucks as Buzz McDonnall
- 2011: Wartgirl as Ash's Bodyguard
- 2012: Happy Camper as Buzz McDonnall
- 2013: The Boys as Jimmy Joe John
- 2013: The Hardy Bucks Movie as Buzz O'Donnell
- 2015: Hardy Bucks Ride Again as Buzz McDonnall
- 2021: Poxy Bleedin' Shop as Eddie
- 2021: Bicycle Thieves: Pumped Up as Bob the Thief
- 2021: Black Eyes as Garda (voice)
- 2022: The Sleep Experiment as Drunk
- 2023: It's Never Sunny in Kilfinane as Narrator
- 2023: Lulu and the Electric Dreamboat as Cyprus Ni Rhian
- 2025: The Spin as Elvis
- 2025: Midlands Mayhem as The Interviewee
- 2025-2026: Funboys as Frank Lynch
- 2026: Ireland’s Oldest Alter Boy as Randy
