= Hardy Bucks =

Irish mockumentary series

- Also known as: Hardy Bucks Ride Again
- Written by: Martin Maloney; Chris Tordoff; Owen Colgan; Tom Kilgallon; Peter Cassidy; Mike Cockayne
- Starring: Martin Maloney; Owen Colgan; Peter Cassidy; Tom Kilgallon; Michael Salmon; Chris Tordoff
- Country of origin: Ireland
- Original language: English
- No. of seasons: 4
- No. of episodes: 32 (12 webisodes + 20 episodes)

Production
- Producer: Mike Cockayne
- Running time: 26 minutes per episode (TV); 9 minutes per webisode

Original release
- Network: RTÉ Two
- Release: 19 October 2008 – present

Hardy Bucks is an Irish comedy series, filmed in mockumentary style and following the fictional exploits of a group of twentysomething slackers living in small-town Ireland.

It started out as an online series of largely improvised scenes. A six-part webisode series went on to win the 2009 Storyland competition held by Irish national broadcaster RTÉ Television.

== Production ==
Hardy Bucks was created in 2007 when Chris Tordoff (Viper Higgins) filmed Martin Maloney (Eddie Durkan) and Owen Colgan (Buzz McDonnell) for a college project. After sitting on the footage for a year, Tordoff uploaded the shorts to YouTube. Hardy Bucks was entered into the RTÉ Storyland competition and from a total of 122 applications, nine projects were commissioned to make one episode each. These episodes were released in March 2009. With all nine projects on the website, the public could vote for their favourite and at the end of every month the shows with the fewest votes would be voted off, leaving the remaining teams to make the next episode with the same €8,000 budget per episode. Hardy Bucks made it all the way to the finals (two teams) and ultimately won with the largest number of votes. The show was filmed on location in Swinford, County Mayo, from where many of the extras were sourced.

A three-episode television series, written by the writing trio Tordoff, Maloney and Mike Cockayne, was commissioned and broadcast by RTÉ from 12 October 2010 until 26 October 2010. Following the success of the debut television series, RTÉ commissioned a half-hour Christmas special which aired on 26 December 2010, with Liz Gill succeeding Cockayne as director. Hardy Bucks' second series, a six-episode run, was broadcast by RTÉ during 2011. The Hardy Bucks Movie was released by Universal Pictures in Feb 2013, achieving Box Office no.1 on its opening weekend and becoming the most successful Irish film of the year. Hardy Bucks returned with a third series in November 2015, and again with a fourth series in March 2018. In July 2026, Owen Colgan confirmed the show would be returning for a fifth series, however, Tordoff stated that he would not be returning as The Viper, and that he would not be "involved in it, in any way shape or form."

The programme has been compared to Trailer Park Boys, a Canadian mockumentary, with Tordoff citing the show as an influence.

== Characters ==
=== Protagonists ===
- Eddie Durkan (Martin Maloney) - the main character, an unemployed and lazy youth with vague ambitions of emigrating to find a better life.
- Billy "Buzz" McDonnell (Owen Colgan) - Eddie's best friend, something of a philosopher who often argues with Eddie. McDonnell regularly wears a Celtic shirt and has a love of jambons and crows.
- "Frenchtoast" O'Toole (Peter Cassidy) - known for his love of nature, fishing, and making political statements. Rapidly fluctuates between being a spiritualist and an alcoholic.
- Tommy "The Boo" Boogenhagen (Tom Kilgallon) - a fitness lover with a mysterious past.

=== Antagonists ===
- Francis "The Viper" Higgins (Chris Tordoff) - the main antagonist, a vain, arrogant but woefully inept small-time drug dealer whose wildly ambitious and poorly planned schemes almost invariably land him in trouble. In seasons 1 to 4.
- Stateside (Tommy Miller) - one of the Viper's henchmen. Has vague ambitions of becoming a singer/dancer.
- Dragon (Wayne Lynch) - The Viper's driver and henchman.
- Viper 2 (Paul Butler Lennox) - an actor hired by the Viper to act as a decoy.
- Jimmy 'The Hammer' Harrington (Andrew Williams) - Buzz's psychopathic, cross dressing, hammer-toting long lost cousin. Appears in Season 4, when he hides from the law in Eddie and Buzz's cottage.

=== Other characters ===
- Salmon (Michael Salmon) An unemployed man who befriends the Hardy Bucks. Married Sveltana and works for Seamus Mortimer and Aloysius Lavin.
- Seamie / Rama (Rhys Flinter) - A local from Castletown who returned from his first semester in arts college with a South Dublin accent.
- Svetlana Salmon (Lisa McAllister) - Salmon's improbably attractive Russian girlfriend.
- Big Mick (Eugene Maloney) - Eddie's uncle and lover of the craic. Always tries to push Eddie to get a job and make the family proud.
- Seamus Mortimer (Michael Browne) - Local businessman and politician. Salmon’s boss and friend of Aloysius Lavin.
- Ciara (Aoibheann McCaul) - Eddie's overbearing nymphomaniac girlfriend in series 3 and 4.
- Sim Card (Kevin McGahern) - The Viper's apologetic "hash gimp"/accomplice, but his true love is ice cream.
- Aloysius Lavin (Micheál Mac Donnchadha) - Owner of the Castletown golf club, landlord, businessman.
- Patty (Susan Loughnane) - Briefly the Viper's girlfriend, but she soon left him for Buzz in series 3.
- "Scorpio" Lyons (Alan Carter) - local DJ, head of the 'Almera Bois'.
- Noreen (Loretta Lee) - Eddie's girlfriend in series 1 and 2.
- Orla Flannery (Sheila Moylette) Good friend of Noreen's.
- Lexus (Paul Maloney) - Eddie's cousin and recovering alcoholic.
- Garda Koffi (Koffi Kuovi) Castletown exchange-programme policeman, and friend/business partner of The Boo.
- Cowboy Lavin (Stephen Kelly) Friend of the Bucks with a fixation on American things.
- Crowbar (Chris Kilcoyne) - leader of the Sligo Boys. Serves as Viper’s aggressive and violent counterpart.
- Sligo Boy (James Durcan) - Part of Crowbar's crew, brought on by Viper's dealings.
- Ladybird (Kate Lawless) - New Age library patron who attracts Eddie and Buzz' interests.
- Shady Ganley (Peter Ganley) - local hardman who was raised by crows.

== Episode list ==
=== Webisodes ===
No.	Title	Original release date
1	"Eddie & Buzz"	19 October 2008
Introduces the two "hardy bucks" and the Viper. They visit the library where they meet "Ladybird" who runs a psychic book club. "The Boo" somehow finds his way into Eddie and Buzz's cottage, and teaches them about weapons. Eddie gets drunk and stoned the night before his Safe Pass test.
2	"Safe Pass"	19 October 2008
Eddie sits the Safe Pass Course which he needs to get on the sites in Galway. Buzz has other ideas and runs away to meet new friends at Ladybirds workshop.
3	"The Plan"	20 October 2008
It's time for a plan. Galway beckons but the lads have no money. With a bit of help from an unwitting buddy, they hatch a scheme that's guaranteed to at least cover the petrol money. The lads manage to escape the disturbing Aloisius Lavin but how will they throw a party if the Viper has their mushrooms?
4	"The Mitzi Turbo Cup"	16 March 2009
The lads try to earn a bit of money "in the claw" by entering the Mitzi Turbo Cup - an annual underground boy racer tournament.
5	"Foamy Nites"	27 April 2009
After getting laid off Big Mick's construction site, the lads try their hand at organizing a party to make some quick cash
6	"Episode 6"	5 June 2009
Summer is upon Castletown, and the lads try their hand at speed dating. Buzz learns of Viper's relationship with Ladybird.
7	"The Drink is a Curse"	21 July 2009
A lovely bit of sunshine descends upon Castletown. Eddie's cousin Lexus is introduced. The bucks gatecrash a party in the forest.
8	"The Interview"	31 August 2009
Big Mick secures Eddie a job interview, but everyone in the town is trying for the same job. Buzz forgoes it in favor of a local festival.
9	"Episode 9"	29 September 2009
Scorpio is hosting a karaoke party. The Viper has to corner the local drug market, and Noreen has some important news for Eddie.
10	"Christmas in Castletown"	27 December 2009
The lads have to figure out how to make cash for Christmas. French Toast and Buzz teach an urban survival course in the handball alley; while The Boo brings Salmon out the forest to cut down Christmas trees and hopefully teach him about the ways of nature.
11	"No One Shouted Shtop!"	12 April 2011
The bucks reflect upon the recession. The Guards seize 400k worth of hash from a local gaff, opening the market up for the Viper
12	"The Lads of Summer"	3 May 2011
The Boo is trying to break into the security industry, as Obama is about to visit Ireland.

=== Television ===
==== Season 1 (2010) ====
No. overall	No. in season	Title	Original release date
1	1	"The Shkyline"	10 October 2010
Eddie tries to earn some extra cash by running a taxi service, as well as entering a celebrity look-alike contest.
2	2	"Zambezi Nights"	17 October 2010
The Bucks promote a Zambezi-themed restaurant. The Viper tries to harass Eddie.
3	3	"King of the Town"	24 October 2010
The Bucks recruit Lexus in an effort to win the annual King of the Town competition, a day-long celebration of toughness and debauchery.
4	4	"Christmas Special"	26 December 2010
The Bucks hit the 12 pubs of Christmas culminating in the ultimate hangover cure – a Hardy Christmas dinner.

==== Season 2 (2011) ====
No. overall	No. in season	Title	Original release date
5	1	"America"	14 November 2011
A lie told by Eddie in order to impress his ex-girlfriend sets his life on a new track. Meanwhile, Frenchtoast hopes to change his fortunes, but is finding it difficult to get help from the lads - especially Buzz, whose sex life has reached an unexpected high.
6	2	"Broadband"	21 November 2011
Boo has an offer the gang cannot refuse, a plan that will see them bringing the cottage into the 21st-century, but they hit a stumbling block when Buzz's aunty decides to visit. Meanwhile, Viper schemes to bring his big plan to fruition, but realises he needs help from Simcard to make it happen
7	3	"L.A. Pool Party"	28 November 2011
Having lost the cottage, the lads are homeless. Buzz and Frenchtoast move in with Simcard, leaving Eddie to move back in with his family. Eddie gets the lads work at an "LA pool party", organised by an unknown artist.
8	4	"The Vision"	5 December 2011
Buzz visits Eddie in the middle of the night after experiencing a vision in a dream, but when the future does not pan out as Buzz imagined, it is up to Frenchtoast to bring the boys back together. Meanwhile the Viper gives Simcard his dream job.
9	5	"The Stag"	12 December 2011
Eddie is asked to perform an important duty for Salmon, and considers Uncle Mick's surprise solution to his problems.
10	6	"Salmon's Wedding"	19 December 2011
Buzz calls on the help of Boo when his sex-life causes him problems, and Viper goes into hiding after his insurance policy falls through. Meanwhile, the whole town turns out for a major event on the social calendar, and Eddie spots an opportunity to make amends when he shares an intimate moment with his ex.

==== Season 3: Hardy Bucks Ride Again (2015) ====
No. overall	No. in season	Title	Original release date
11	1	"Panic Attack"	26 October 2015
Eddie feels he needs a woman's touch to put him back on the straight and narrow, so tries to win back Noreen.
12	2	"The Psych Ward"	2 November 2015
After ruining his chances with his ex, Eddie Durkan finds love in a psychiatric ward, and Boo offers the lads the chance to run their own pub.
13	3	"Soft Lad"	9 November 2015
Castletown is about to witness its first ever interracial gay wedding, while Eddie has finally got a job. But can he cope with the pressure from his nymphomaniac girlfriend, the lads at work and his best mate, who all think he's gone soft?
14	4	"Castle Con"	23 November 2015
When a minor celebrity lands in Castletown Eddie spots an opportunity and decides to put on a science fiction convention. Meanwhile Viper joins one of Ireland’s biggest gangs, but has he bitten off more than he can chew?
15	5	"Oxogen"	30 November 2015
Castletown is hosting a major music festival and Eddie decides to organise a day out with the lads, but his plans for a bonding session go awry when his long-lost brother turns up.
16	6	"The Intervention"	7 December 2015
With Frenchtoast still on the wagon, the lads decide to take drastic action and plan an intervention to get him back on the drink. Eddie and Buzz's love lives become very complicated. Meanwhile, Viper organises a fight with the Sligo boy's with help from the Chinese.

==== Season 4 (2018) ====
No. overall	No. in season	Title	Original release date
17	1	"Threeway"	20 March 2018
Ciara wants Eddie to move in with her, while the Viper acquires an ice-cream van and tries to use it to sell hash.
18	2	"Jimmy the Hammer"	29 March 2018
Eddie is moving out of the cottage, but then Buzz's long lost cousin Jimmy 'The Hammer' Harrington shows up to cause trouble.
19	3	"VR"	5 April 2018
Viper tries to resurrect his business by gambling, while the lads attempt to set up a virtual reality pub.
20	4	"The Viper"	12 April 2018
The guys receive bad news from Bangkok.

==== Season 5 (2026) ====
No. overall	No. in season	Title	Original release date
21	1	TBA	TBA
22	2	TBA	TBA
23	3	TBA	TBA
24	4	TBA	TBA
25	5	TBA	TBA
26	6	TBA	TBA

== Film ==
On 28 November 2012, a trailer was released to promote The Hardy Bucks Movie, scheduled for cinematic release on 21 February 2013. The film follows the Hardy Bucks as they travel to Poland to support the Irish football team during the UEFA Euro 2012 football tournament. The film was produced by Universal Studios. The film had a budget of €300,000, partly funded by a €175,000 production loan granted by The Irish Film Board, and was an Irish box office success. It grossed €176,887 on its opening weekend from 57 locations, and went on to take over €500,000 at the Irish box office.
