= Eugene Washington =

British actor of stage and screen (born 1974)

- Born: Eugene Washington Norman Walker; 7 August 1974 (age 51); Hammersmith, London, England
- Education: The Academy Drama School
- Occupation: Actor
- Years active: 2001-present

Eugene Washington (born Eugene Washington Norman Walker; 7 August 1974) is a British actor of stage and screen.

== Early life ==
Washington was born in Hammersmith, London, England, UK.

== Career ==
He was last seen on stage in 2010 playing the title role in Shakespeare's Othello in a 9-month world tour in a joint venture for American Drama Group Europe (ADGE) and TNT Theatre, which saw him perform to audiences in Israel, Japan, Switzerland, Germany, Luxembourg, Austria, Norway, Sweden, Denmark, Isle of Man, Jersey, Costa Rica, El Salvador and China.

Eugene has also played the part of Henry Angell in Agatha Christie's The Unexpected Guest (No.1 UK Tour) alongside Casualty's Simon MacCorkindale and EastEnders' Dean Gaffney for Bill Kenwright Ltd (making Eugene the first black actor to star in a professional Agatha Christie production in the UK).

He also played Dog Fox in The Lion, the Witch and the Wardrobe for The Royal Shakespeare Company in Stratford-upon-Avon and was in the cast for the world premiere of Howard Brenton's play Paul at the Royal National Theatre.

Eugene's screen credits include Law & Order: UK, Casualty, plus an appearance in the 2006 season of Doctor Who in an episode entitled "School Reunion", playing a creepy alien teacher named Mr. Wagner. He has also appeared in Doctors, Judge John Deed and had a lead guest role as Captain Rogan in Star Hyke in an episode entitled "Lucy in the Sky".

== Personal life ==
Eugene graduated from The Academy Drama School, London in 2001.

== Filmography ==
=== Film ===
Year	Title	Role	Notes
2005	Attack	Max	Short film
2009	The Last Time I Saw You	Police Detective	Short film
2013	The Last Job	Man	Short film

=== Television ===
Year	Title	Role	Notes
2005	Judge John Deed	Foreman	Episode: "In Defence of Others"
2005	Doctors	D.I. Earl Griffin	Episode: "Catch Me If You Can"
2005–2007	Kings and Pharaohs	Kyoza	7 episodes
2006	Casualty	Carl Hanway	Episode: "Needle"
2006	Doctor Who	Mr. Wagner	Episode: "School Reunion"
2006	Brief Encounters	IT Teacher	Episode: "Hot or Not"
2009	Star Hyke	Captain Rogan	Episode: "Lucy in the Sky"
2009	Law & Order: United Kingdom	Andy Valente	Episode: "Love and Loss"
2012	Casualty	Supt. Clark Williams	Episode: "#HolbyRiot: Part One"
2015	EastEnders	Clerk of the Court	5 episodes
2016	Derren Brown: The Push	Eugene	Television documentary movie
