= The Spin (film) =

2025 Irish comedy film

- Directed by: Michael Head
- Written by: Colin Broderick, Mark McCausland
- Produced by: Jake Jacovides
- Starring: Tara Lynne O’Neill, Owen Colgan, Maura Higgins, Kimberly Wyatt, Leah O’Rourke
- Cinematography: Sebastian Cort
- Edited by: Aideen Johnston
- Music by: Mark McCausland
- Release date: February 27, 2025
- Running time: 92 Minutes
- Country: Ireland
- Language: English

The Spin is a 2025 Irish comedy film directed by Michael Head, written by Colin Broderick and inspired by the real life story of Mark McCausland. The film stars Owen Colgan, Tara Lynne O'Neill, Brenock O'Connor, Maura Higgins, Kimberly Wyatt, and Leah O'Rourke.

== Plot ==
Two music-loving but unlikely friends have two days to travel the length of Ireland to save their record store from closure. For one of them, not having a car is just one of the problems.

== Production ==
The film was shot around Northern Ireland in 2024.

== Cast ==
- Tara Lynne O'Neill as Sadie
- Brenock O'Connor as Dermot
- Owen Colgan as Elvis
- Maura Higgins as Rose
- Kimberly Wyatt as Dallas
- Leah O'Rourke as Tracey
- Barry Devlin as Old Man Selling Records
- Amy McElhatton as Debbie
- Ian Toner as Big Dave
- Claire Malone as The Nun
- Adam McFarland as Frank
- Cian Newell as Jake
- Joe Savino as Man with Fox
- Parnell Scott as Barman
- Bean McCaugherty as Police Officer
- Leigh Arnold as Sean’s Widow
- Cait Ellis-Gowland as Lily
- Mary Cahill as Old Mary
- Winston Finlay as Garage Owner
- Johnnie Mullin as Sean Carney
- Mollie Teague as Mollie

== Release ==
A trailer for the film was released in February, 2025. The film was released into Irish cinemas on February 27th, 2025, and was released into UK cinemas in October 24th, 2025.

== Reception ==
Film Ireland stated that "The Spin has the intimate comedic charm of the American record-store indie classic High Fidelity (2000) and celebrates themes of how the power of music can inspire and restore hope like the iconic feature The Commitments".

The Guardian gave the film a positive review, saying "Here is a goofy road movie comedy with some cheeky borrowings from Nick Hornby's High Fidelity; it’s a bit broad, and the ending doesn’t exactly gel, but it’s likable all the same".

Film Review Daily gave the film a 3½ star rating, saying "the film tries too hard to bring in plot contrivances that will for the most part deliver happy endings all round".

UK Film Review gave the film a 4/5 star rating, stating "The Spin is a story about pursuing your dreams and being unapologetically yourself, while welcoming others to do the same around us. A lovely message, sent through wonderful performances by a well assembled cast, from a lovely film".

FilmInk stated "There’s something beautifully good-hearted about The Spin, with its themes of friendship and kindness. Stick around for the end credits for a little bit more of the tale – and an extra dash of the feel-good factor that made this journey almost worth it".
