= Eileen Roberts =

Irish solicitor, High Court judge

The Hon. Ms. Justice Eileen Roberts
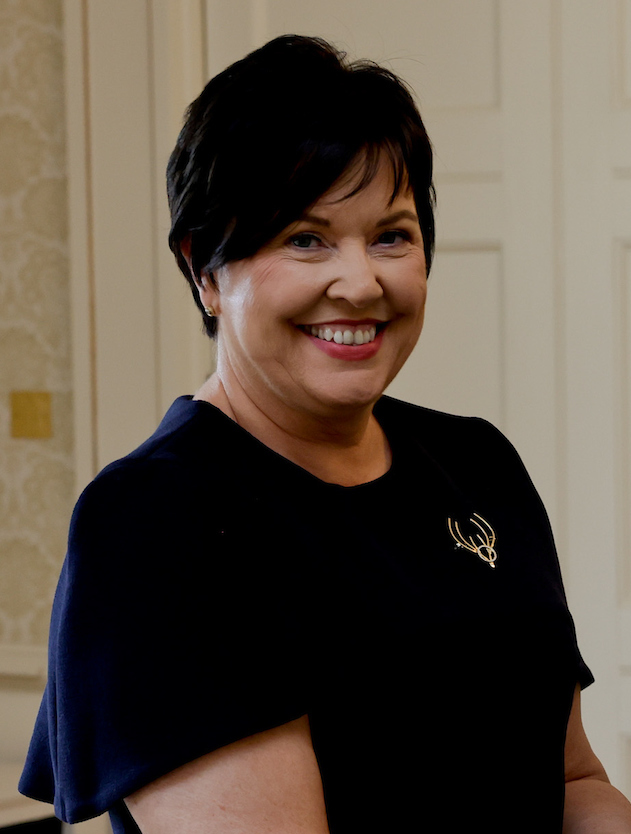
- Roberts in 2022

Judge of the High Court
- Incumbent
- Assumed office 13 July 2022
- Nominated by: Government of Ireland
- Appointed by: Michael D. Higgins

Personal details
- Born: Dublin, Ireland
- Education: Trinity College Dublin; Law Society of Ireland

Eileen Roberts is an Irish judge and lawyer who has served as a Judge of the High Court since July 2022. She previously worked as a solicitor practising in commercial litigation.

== Early life ==
Roberts was born in Dublin and lived in County Carlow from the age of four. She received a law degree from Trinity College Dublin.

== Legal career ==
She was admitted as a solicitor in 1991 and holds a qualification in mediation. She qualified as a solicitor while working at the law firm A&L Goodbody, where she became a partner in 2000. She was the chair of the firm between 2019 and 2022.

Her practice was in commercial litigation, where she represented clients in investigations and in cases in the courts and tribunals of inquiry. She was solicitor for Irish Life during bankruptcy proceedings of Seán Dunne. She has written and lectured in law, and has been a committee member of the Irish Commercial Mediation Association and the Irish Commercial Litigation Association.

== Judicial career ==
She was nominated to become a judge of the High Court in June 2022, following a vacancy created by Senan Allen. She was appointed in July 2022.
