= Bobby Holland Hanton =

English stunt performer and actor

Bobby Holland Hanton (born 1984) is an English stunt performer and actor. He has worked as a stunt double on major film and television productions, including entries in the James Bond, Marvel Cinematic Universe, Star Wars, and DC film franchises.

== Early life ==
Hanton was born in Portsmouth, England. He was a competitive gymnast and National Squad Member/Gold Medalist for Great Britain. After retiring from gymnastics he turned to football and played as a semi-professional for Fareham Town FC. Following this he spent several years training in disciplines including kickboxing, swimming, high diving, and gymnastics to qualify for the British Stunt Register.

== Career ==
Hanton began working in the film industry in the late 2000s, including on the 2008 James Bond film Quantum of Solace. He has since worked as a stunt performer and stunt double on a range of film and television productions.

=== Acting work ===
In addition to stunt work, Hanton has received acting credits in film and television.

== Records ==
In April 2009, Hanton set a Guinness World Records mark for the "most targets hit with a back somersault throw in one hour" (24), achieved at Pinewood Studios in the United Kingdom.

== Philanthropy ==
Hanton has been named an ambassador for the Battle Cancer charity initiative.

== Publications ==
- The Adventures of Eddie and Flip Boy (2022).

== Filmography ==
=== Acting roles ===
Year	Title	Role	Notes
TBA	Stuntnuts: The Movie	Himself (Note: Listed as cast in the cited source; role credit is not specified there.)	Unreleased
2026	Untitled Jack Ryan Project	Runner 2	Credit only; post-production
2026	School Fight	Bobby Harding	Completed
2025	Now You See Me: Now You Don't	Interpol agent	
2024	Argylle	Enforcer #1	
2022	Thor: Love and Thunder	Habooska the Horrible	
2013	Little Favour		Short film
2011	Green Lantern	Security guard	Uncredited
2011	Pirates of the Caribbean: On Stranger Tides	English guard	Uncredited
2010	The Twisted Whiskers Show		TV series; 1 episode
2009	Easier Ways to Make a Living		Short film

=== Stunt work ===
(Credits include stunt performance and/or stunt doubling.)

Year(s)	Title	Format	Stunt credit	Notes
2026	Crime 101	Film	Chris Hemsworth stunt double	
2023	Extraction 2	Film	Stunt double (Chris Hemsworth)	
2022	Limitless	TV series	Stunts	1 episode
2022	Thor: Love and Thunder	Film	Stunt double (Thor / Chris Hemsworth)	
2022	The Batman	Film	Stunt performer	
2021	Black Widow	Film	Stunt performer	
2021	The Nevers	TV series	Stunt performer	2 episodes
2020	Pennyworth	TV series	Stunt performer	Uncredited; 2 episodes
2020	Extraction	Film	Stunt double (Rake) / stunts	
2019	Men in Black: International	Film	Stunt double (Chris Hemsworth)	
2019	Avengers: Endgame	Film	Stunt double (Chris Hemsworth)	
2018	Fantastic Beasts: The Crimes of Grindelwald	Film	Stunt performer	
2018	Bad Times at the El Royale	Film	Stunt double (Chris Hemsworth) / stunts	
2018	Mission: Impossible – Fallout	Film	Stunts	
2018	Solo: A Star Wars Story	Film	Stunt performer	
2018	Avengers: Infinity War	Film	Stunt double (Thor)	
2017	Thor: Ragnarok	Film	Stunt double (Chris Hemsworth)	
2015–2017	Game of Thrones	TV series	Stunt performer	9 episodes
2017	Wonder Woman	Film	Stunt performer	
2017	First They Killed My Father	Film	Stunts	
2016	Assassin's Creed	Film	Stunt performer	
2016	Fantastic Beasts and Where to Find Them	Film	Stunt performer	
2016	The Promise	Film	Stunt double (Christian Bale)	
2016	The Legend of Tarzan	Film	Stunt performer	
2016	Alice Through the Looking Glass	Film	Utility stunts / stunt performer	Uncredited
2016	The Huntsman: Winter's War	Film	Stunt double (Chris Hemsworth)	
2015	Star Wars: The Force Awakens	Film	Stunt performer	Uncredited
2015	In the Heart of the Sea	Film	Stunt double (Chris Hemsworth) / stunt performer	
2015	Spectre	Film	Stunts	
2015	Avengers: Age of Ultron	Film	Stunt double (Thor / Captain America)	Chris Evans / Chris Hemsworth
2015	Jupiter Ascending	Film	Stunt double (Channing Tatum)	
2014	Maleficent	Film	Stunt performer	
2013	Thor: The Dark World	Film	Stunt double (Chris Hemsworth / Thor)	Credited as Bobby Holland
2013	Captain Phillips	Film	Stunts	Credited as Bobby Holland-Hanton
2012	Merlin	TV series	Stunt performer	Credited as Bobby Hanton; 2 episodes
2012	Skyfall	Film	Stunts	
2012	Midsomer Murders	TV series	Stunt performer	1 episode
2012	The Dark Knight Rises	Film	Stunt double (Batman)	
2012	Snow White and the Huntsman	Film	Stunt performer	
2012	John Carter	Film	Stunts	
2011	Sherlock Holmes: A Game of Shadows	Film	Stunt performer	
2011	War Horse	Film	Stunt performer	Uncredited
2011	Captain America: The First Avenger	Film	Stunts	
2011	Harry Potter and the Deathly Hallows: Part 2	Film	Stunts	
2011	Green Lantern	Film	Stunt double (Green Lantern) / stunts	Ryan Reynolds; uncredited
2011	Pirates of the Caribbean: On Stranger Tides	Film	Stunt performer	
2011	Blitz	Film	Stunt performer	
2010	Gulliver's Travels	Film	Stunts	Credited as Bobby Hanton
2010	Harry Potter and the Deathly Hallows: Part 1	Film	Stunts	
2010	Devil's Playground	Film	Stunt zombie	
2010	Inception	Film	Stunts	Credited as Bobby Hanton
2010	Robin Hood	Film	Stunts	
2010	Prince of Persia: The Sands of Time	Film	Stunt double (Jake Gyllenhaal / Dastan)	
2008	Quantum of Solace	Film	Stunt double (Daniel Craig)	
