= Goss.ie =

Goss.ie is an Irish entertainment news website based in Dublin, featuring content focused on both Irish and international celebrities. The site was set up by Alexandra Ryan in June 2014.

Goss.ie also broadcasts a daily show business show called The Daily Goss.

Since 2016, Goss.ie has hosted a yearly award show called "Gossies" which is meant to showcase notable people in Irish entertainment.
