= British Stunt Register =

The British Stunt Register (BSR) is a member's association and the only known, UK based, organised group of peer reviewed stunt professionals. It offers members screen relevant Health & Safety training, and operates a Career Grade Scheme. The BSR provides the only formally recognised UK criteria for training, induction, and professional recognition available to those wishing to pursue a career in stunts for screen entertainment.

The association also provides its members with relevant professional information, a performer development program, general support and guidance, and it is a bridge between the members and other creative screen media organisations and safety groups.

== Formation and Structure ==
Founded in 1973, it was conceived to operate as a register of stunt performers in Britain - distinct from actors and supporting artists. At that time it was known as, and the first directory published was entitled "Stunt Arrangers & Performers: A register approved jointly by the Film Production Association of Great Britain and British Actors' Equity Association".

Originally the aim was to start regulating some of the practices relating to stunt work in the context of the film and television industry as well as disseminate members information to producers and directors.

The stunt register directory was published with the aid of the agency Spotlight for many years up to and including the 13th edition. Printed as private editions, none of the books carry an ISBN.

For many years the body of people forming the register were overseen by the combined efforts of three committees. In common parlance it was known as The Equity Register or simply The Stunt Register, but also known as the JISC Register (Joint Industry Stunt Committee). Career grades were facilitated by the actors union Equity and JISC representatives in conjunction with JIGS (the Joint Industry Grading Scheme). Members of these boards included industry peers from producers' associations and significant broadcast industry employers such as the BBC and ITV. The tri-committee management eventually dissolved leaving the stunt community without an infrastructure for their professional credentials.

Under advisement from the dissolved committees, some members of the former JISC formed a working party seeking to reinstate an infrastructure. In November 2017 The British Stunt Register opened its very first, dedicated office at Pinewood Studios and was formed as a members association, which, though it had shed the involvement of other managing committees, did initially retain the same grade structure and rulebook of its previous Equity/JISC form. This was a necessity for continuity within the industry, while identifying and addressing the issues that had not been resolvable by the previous management structure. Those issues included the provision of stunt health & safety training and updating the criteria for both membership and career progression. The British Stunt Register in its new 'association' form gave credit to the former JISC for its foundation and base rules, on the BSR website. Additionally it was made clear that all members of the former JISC were invited to transfer membership and therefore maintain 'current' credentials under the new management system. The British Stunt Register website also stated that any former JISC members who had not yet accepted the invitation are still welcome to join the BSR while their credentials have parity with the new and rising standards. Grandfather rights were negligible but fair, as each individual is always strictly assessed on demonstrable and documented experience as demanded by the former and the current criteria. (Said information appears to have since been moved or removed following a re-design of the BSR website). The current and up to date website can be found at bsr.co.

In its present form, the British Stunt Register continues to maintain and encourage standards for stunt safety, and welcomes discourse with industry colleagues. The BSR office has administrative staff and an elected, volunteer committee who are all experienced stunt professionals. The committee maintain an overview of the organisation and preside over membership applications and grade decisions. Industry peers, including those from film and television 'Health & Safety' companies have been invited to form an independent verification board, in the spirit of good governance.

== Relevance ==
The British Stunt Register is a source of credible Stunt Professionals for the creative screen media industries; film, television, streaming-on-demand, mo-cap, advertising and gaming; it provides a structure for learning and career grading in a uniquely diverse profession that still is not yet represented in an academic, institutional or regulated setting.

Over the years it has become essential for action coordinators, co-performers and their employers to have such a structure for reference, in order that they may have confidence in ability and experience, in what was once a mysterious job or 'daredevil' activity. As such, even as late as the 1970s this aspect of the film making process was barely distinguishable from the early days of cinema, during which extras were often approached to take a bit of a risk for extra financial reward. Examples of such casual practice are referenced in the memoirs of founding members Frank Henson and Jim Dowdall.

Generally, within the professional UK screen stunt fraternity now, such carefree attitudes to safety are a thing of the past and the UK stunt register has a relatively low rate of incident reporting. Risk assessments, health and safety training, maintaining skills and fitness- including healthy lifestyle and well-being, are all de rigueur.

The British film and television industry is renowned for its quality services and technicians – this includes the reputation of the performers and action coordinators of the British Stunt Register, whose members are engaged regularly to work on some of the most popular and highest grossing visual media productions the world has seen, historically and recently. (Marvel Cinematic Universe, Star Wars, Game of Thrones, Vikings, Bond 007, Bourne, Mission Impossible).

Long time members of this very niche profession and tight knit community, are confident that the majority of working Stunt Professionals in the UK today, are active members of the British Stunt Register. They are sought to work at studios and locations within the UK and globally.

During 2020 the UK Government website for the National Careers Service listed the British Stunt Register as the recognised body for obtaining career credentials in this field of work, though it is worth noting that the National Careers Service listing was in need of further updates at that time as it referenced the former 3 tier Grade Scheme and not the current 5 tier grade scheme (see Grade Scheme below). The listing is currently unavailable (December 2021).

== Membership ==
Historically, once the joining criteria and grade scheme were established, it became problematic to undertake stunt work without having proven a suitability to it. The training syllabus for entry to the stunt register was, and still is sports oriented. In order to be accepted for membership a trainee must meet high level requirements in six sporting disciplines within designated categories. A martial art is compulsory, and all achievements must be verifiable by independent and regulated or licensed bodies. A combination of acting experience and drama training is also required, and upon joining, the Level 1 BSR Health & Safety course must be undertaken.

The criteria for membership was overhauled shortly after the re-formation of the register (2017-2018), and new and improved application requirements were published on the BSR website in 2019. The new criteria was considered more clearly defined and closed potential loopholes to prevent abuse of the rules. None of the prior criteria were eased or dumbed down - in favour of pressing for excellence. The criteria undergoes rolling review and is expected to adapt for relevance and appropriate ease of access to the stunt industry.

There is a lower age limit of eighteen for membership applications but no upper age limit.

Elite international professionals (non-British) who can fulfil the application requirements are not excluded from applying for membership.

== Grade Scheme ==
The BSR stunt grading scheme exists to recognise proven experience, demonstrating to potential employers and colleagues in what way a stunt performer may be suited to a particular role or effect. Formerly just 3 tiers, it has been changed to a 5 tier system that recognises the changes in the industry and anticipates further safe career progression.

Historical context and development:

The former 3 tier grade scheme implemented by the Equity/JISC committees comprised Probationary, Intermediate and Full membership grades. By the time the members formed the new association, the grade scheme was deemed stagnant and didn't adequately represent the experience of working in a significantly different and rapidly changing media industry. Key concerns were that a member could remain under the 'Probationary' moniker for their entire career alongside a brand new and inexperienced member. The scheme didn't recognise the years of experience and a performer may not be incentivised to upgrade to 'Intermediate' if they didn't wish to work alone or move beyond into supervisory roles. Characteristics of the Intermediate grade requirements could hold back a member who worked primarily in television and wanted to upgrade to 'Full Member' (i.e. to be able to conceive, coordinate and supervise action for either film or TV).

Where the UK stunt register had once inspired the formation of similar organisations for other production departments and in other countries, latterly the BSR committee pro-actively sought examples from their peers in the international stunt industry and other departments (SFX) for corollary professional frameworks, adaptable to the core values of the British Stunt Register and its community.

To meet ever-greater artistic demands, keep up with technological developments, and recognise the members who were falling through the cracks, the scheme needed to change. The employment climate required greater transparency and better health and safety training which the members took seriously but was not yet formalised in the structure of the organisation. It was recognised that the role of coordinator should be learned by undertaking some of the duties as an assistant coordinator and with the safeguard of supervisory rules, rather than let the grade scheme have this grey area.

The new 5 tier Grade System addressed those issues. Health & Safety training was developed in conjunction with film and television safety service providers and made a mandatory requirement for all members. It became integral to the membership requirements and upgrade criteria. For Health & Safety reasons Probationary members may only work under a British Stunt Registered co-ordinator. The Probationary grade functions in the true meaning of the word and is a capped period of time and minimum experience required before moving up to 'Stunt Performer' grade. Senior Stunt Performer is broadly equivalent to the former Intermediate level and such BSR members may undertake their own risk assessment and work alone – no-one else may be involved in the stunt action. The new 'Key Stunt Performer' grade sits between Senior Stunt Performer and 'Full Member', being the sensible bridge between working alone without supervision and learning to supervise as an assistant to an experienced stunt action coordinator (Full Member).

The new grade scheme will be subject to regular internal review by the BSR committee with the assistance of the Independent Verification Board, to anticipate a relevant and organic scheme that can accommodate the needs of the industry and a responsible work culture.

== British Stunt Register Members in External Sources ==
Members past and present appeared in the British 2018 documentary In Praise of Action (dir. Aiste Jauraite and Skaiste Jauraite) and in 2021 Hollywood Bulldogs: The Rise and Falls of the Great British Stuntman (dir. John Spira, nar. Ray Winstone), including Vic Armstrong, Abbi Collins, Sarah Franzl, David Holmes, Rocky Taylor, Paul Weston.

Maria Hippolyte (Black Panther) and former member Amanda Foster have each been interviewed for various publications, as has the relatively high-profile Bobby Holland Hanton who is well known for doubling actor Chris Hemsworth. London based newspaper Metro has also featured some BSR members (among others) for their occasional series 'Seeing Double'.

Member Annabel Canaven consulted with author Tamsin Cooke for her children's book Stunt Double (2017).

=== Memoirs of BSR members ===
- Armstrong, Vic (2011). The True Adventures of the World's Greatest Stuntman (numerous contributors)
- Dowdall, Jim (2019). Man On Fire. The Life and Other Accidents of Jim Dowdall, Stuntman: Foreword by James May
- Henson, Frank (2018). The Luck of Losing the Toss - My Career in the Movies and TV
- Taylor, Rocky (2019). Jump Rocky Jump: How I Fell Into Stunt Work with a foreword by Ray Winstone
- Simmons, Bob (1987). (*Not a member of the BSR (*reformed 2017), membership of former iterations of the register unconfirmed) Nobody Does It Better: My 25 years of Stunts With James Bond and Other Stars
