= Jim Dowdall =

Australian rules footballer (1867–1945)

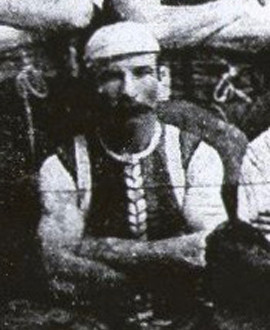
- Dowdall in 1897

Personal information
- Full name: James Matthew George Dowdall
- Born: 8 August 1867; Emerald Hill, Victoria
- Died: 29 April 1945 (aged 77); Parkville, Victoria
- Original team: Emerald Hill / South Melbourne
- Height: 169 cm (5 ft 7 in)
- Weight: 66 kg (146 lb)

Playing career^{1}
| Years | Club | Games (Goals) |
| 1897 | Collingwood | 6 (1) |
- ^{1} Playing statistics correct to the end of 1897.

James Matthew George Dowdall (8 August 1867 – 29 April 1945) was an Australian rules footballer who played for South Melbourne, Collingwood and Richmond in the Victorian Football Association (VFA) and the Victorian Football League (VFL).

Jim and his younger brother Harry both played for South Melbourne in the Victorian Football Association, James from 1887. In 1892 they both tried to move to Collingwood. Jim was unsuccessful and instead played for Richmond. Jim finally made it to Collingwood in 1897 in the inaugural year of the Victorian Football League.

The son of James Dowdall and Isabella McGowan, Jim was, like brother Harry, small of stature and lightly built.

Dowdall played for the Excelsior Football Club in the Ovens & Murray Football League in 1900.

Newspaper reports of the time spell his name (and Harry's) variously as Dowdell/Dowdall. Dowdall is correct.
