= Vic Armstrong =

British stuntman and film director

- Born: 5 October 1946 (age 80); Farnham Common, Buckinghamshire, England
- Occupations: Stunt double, film director

Victor Monroe Armstrong (born 5 October 1946) is a British film director, stunt coordinator, second unit director, and stunt double—the world's most prolific, according to the Guinness Book of Records.

== Career ==
An early role of his before Indiana Jones was in Steptoe and Son episode "The Seven Steptoerai".

In the first three Indiana Jones films, Armstrong doubled for lead actor Harrison Ford. Reportedly, Armstrong looked so much like Ford that the crewmembers on the films were constantly mistaking him for Ford. This proved useful when Ford injured his back and had to sit out for filming crucial action sequences in Indiana Jones and the Temple of Doom, and Armstrong filled in for him. On a private photograph taken on the film set, Ford wrote to Armstrong, "If you learn to talk, I'm in deep trouble!" The stunt where he jumps from a horse onto a German tank in Indiana Jones and the Last Crusade was voted one of the top-10 film stunts of all time by a panel of experts and Sky Movies viewers in the UK in 2002.

Armstrong was unable to work on the fourth Indiana Jones film, Indiana Jones and the Kingdom of the Crystal Skull, due to commitments to The Mummy: Tomb of the Dragon Emperor. He had discussed, though, possible action sequences with Steven Spielberg during production of War of the Worlds.

Other appearances as a stuntman for lead actors include Timothy Dalton for Flash Gordon, George Lazenby for the Swiss Alps skiing scenes in the James Bond film On Her Majesty's Secret Service, and Christopher Reeve in Superman and Superman II.

Armstrong is a famed stunt coordinator and action unit director, notable for (amongst others) the action sequences of several James Bond films, War of the Worlds and I Am Legend. Armstrong was also the opening scene director on Terminator 2: Judgment Day.

In 1993, Armstrong made his directorial debut with action film Joshua Tree (or Army of One), starring Dolph Lundgren, George Segal, Kristian Alfonso, and Ken Foree.

In 2012, Armstrong was second unit director for The Amazing Spider-Man. In 2013, he signed on to direct Left Behind, a remake of the series that got released in 2014. His next directorial effort was the true story A Sunday Horse. He also worked on the 2022 Amazon Prime Video series The Lord of the Rings: The Rings of Power as second unit director and action director.

Armstrong was the subject of This Is Your Life in 2003, when he was surprised by Michael Aspel at Pinewood Studios. He is a long-serving member of the British Stunt Register.

== Awards ==
In 2001, he received a Technical Achievement Academy Award for "the Fan Descender for accurately and safely arresting the descent of stunt persons in high freefalls". In 2002, he received the BAFTA Michael Balcon Award.

== Personal ==
Armstrong is the brother of Andy Armstrong and husband of stuntwoman Wendy Leech, who is the daughter of fellow stunt performer George Leech. He met her while filming Superman II, when she doubled for Margot Kidder).

The couple have four children between them. Armstrong has two children from his first marriage, and Leech has a daughter from her first marriage. They have one daughter together. Vic is uncle to stuntman James Armstrong and film maker Jesse V Johnson

== Bibliography ==
His memoir My Life as Indiana Jones, James Bond, Superman and Other Action Heroes: The True Adventures of the World's Greatest Stuntman was published by Titan Books in early 2011.

== Filmography ==
Year	Title	Stunts	Second unit director	Director
1974	Steptoe and Son	Yes	No	Douglas Argent
1978	Superman	Yes	No	Richard Donner
1979	Bear Island	Yes	Yes	Don Sharp
1980	Superman II	Yes	No	Richard Lester
1980	Flash Gordon	Yes	No	Mike Hodges
1983	Superman III	Yes	No	Richard Lester
1984	Indiana Jones and the Temple of Doom	Yes	No	Steven Spielberg
1985	Red Sonja	Yes	Yes	Richard Fleischer
1987	Empire of the Sun	Yes	No	Steven Spielberg
1987	Million Dollar Mystery	Yes	Yes	Richard Fleischer
1988	Amsterdamned	Yes	No	Dick Maas
1989	Indiana Jones and the Last Crusade	Yes	No	Steven Spielberg
1989	Henry V	Yes	Yes	Kenneth Branagh
1990	Total Recall	Yes	Yes	Paul Verhoeven
1992	Universal Soldier	Yes	Yes	Roland Emmerich
1993	Last Action Hero	Yes	Yes	John McTiernan
1994	Radioland Murders	No	Yes	Mel Smith
1994	Black Beauty	Yes	Yes	Caroline Thompson
1995	Cutthroat Island	Yes	No	Renny Harlin
1996	The Phantom	Yes	Yes	Simon Wincer
1997	Tomorrow Never Dies	Yes	Yes	Roger Spottiswoode
1997	Shadow Conspiracy	Yes	Yes	George P. Cosmatos
1997	Starship Troopers	Yes	Yes	Paul Verhoeven
1999	The World Is Not Enough	Yes	Yes	Michael Apted
2000	Charlie's Angels	Yes	Yes	McG
2002	Die Another Day	Yes	Yes	Lee Tamahori
2002	Gangs of New York	Yes	Action unit director	Martin Scorsese
2003	The League of Extraordinary Gentlemen	Yes	Yes	Stephen Norrington
2004	Blade: Trinity	Yes	Action unit director	David S. Goyer
2004	Miracle	No	Yes	Gavin O'Connor
2005	War of the Worlds	Yes	Yes	Steven Spielberg
2006	I Am Legend	Yes	Yes	Francis Lawrence
2006	Mission Impossible III	Yes	Action unit director	J.J. Abrams
2007	The Golden Compass	Yes	Yes	Chris Weitz
2008	The Mummy: Tomb of the Dragon Emperor	Yes	Action unit director	Rob Cohen
2010	Shanghai	Yes	Action unit director	Mikael Håfström
2011	Thor	Yes	Yes	Kenneth Branagh
2011	The Green Hornet	Yes	Yes	Michel Gondry
2012	The Amazing Spider-Man	Yes	Yes	Marc Webb
2014	Jack Ryan: Shadow Recruit	Yes	Yes	Kenneth Branagh
2015	Eddie the Eagle	No	Yes	Dexter Fletcher
2015	Maze Runner: The Scorch Trials	No	Action unit director	Wes Ball
2016	Mechanic: Resurrection	No	Yes	Dennis Gansel
2017	American Assassin	No	Yes	Michael Cuesta
2018	Johnny English Strikes Again	No	Yes	David Kerr
2019	Angel Has Fallen	No	Yes	Ric Roman Waugh
2022	The Lord of the Rings: The Rings of Power	No	Yes	Various
2024	Lift	No	Action unit director	F. Gary Gray

As stunt double

Year	Title	Actor
1978	Superman	Christopher Reeve
1979	Bear Island	Donald Sutherland
1980	Superman II	Christopher Reeve
1980	Flash Gordon	Timothy Dalton
1981	Raiders of the Lost Ark	Harrison Ford
1982	Blade Runner	Harrison Ford
1983	Star Wars Episode VI: Return of the Jedi	Harrison Ford
1983	Never Say Never Again	Sean Connery
1984	Indiana Jones and the Temple of Doom	Harrison Ford
1989	Indiana Jones and the Last Crusade	Harrison Ford
1991	Regarding Henry	Harrison Ford
1992	Patriot Games	Harrison Ford

As director

Year	Title
1993	Joshua Tree
2014	Left Behind
2016	A Sunday Horse
