= Stephen Baskerville =

American scholar of political science

Stephen K. Baskerville (born October 15, 1957) is an American author and political theorist. He was previously an Associate Professor of Government at Patrick Henry College, and currently teaches at the Collegium Intermarium in Warsaw. He is described by Paul Craig Roberts as a leading authority on divorce, child custody and the family court system. Baskerville's most recent book, Who Lost America?: Why the United States Went “Communist” and What to Do about It, was published in 2024 by Arktos Media.

== Education and employment ==
Baskerville holds a BA in International Relations from American University as well as a PhD in Political Science and History from the London School of Economics and Political Science.

Baskerville was a Professor of Government and Director of the International Politics & Policy program at Patrick Henry College. He was previously Professor of Political Science at Howard University. He is the managing editor of the International Journal for Religious Freedom.

In 1996 Baskerville published Not Peace but a Sword, dealing with the "political theology" of the English Civil War era, which was described by one reviewer as "comprehensive."

== Families and fathers ==
Baskerville has served as the president of the American Coalition of Fathers and Children, and has been featured as a guest on The Political Cesspool.

Human Events described Baskerville as both critiquing the ways the systems create individual crimes and arguing that they create patronage systems and function at times to perpetuate the high levels of divorce that require the current large staffs in the system. It describes Baskerville's speciality as studying how public policy affects the family and working as an activist to change the policy. Baskerville's book Taken Into Custody: The War Against Fatherhood, Marriage and the Family (Cumberland House Publishing, 2007) was described by Touchstone Magazine as possibly his biggest contribution to public policy debates.

In a 2011 article for the International Journal for Religious Freedom, Baskerville described "the sexual agenda," which he defined as "[c]ampaigns for women’s and homosexual rights, same-sex marriage, public education, and other issues related to family and sexuality" as "the greatest threat to religious freedom – and therefore to freedom generally – in the Western world today."
