= Patricia Martin =

Patricia Martin is an American author, speaker, and cultural analyst. She is president and CEO of the Chicago-based marketing firm, LitLamp Communications, which she founded in 1995. She has published several books: RenGen:Renaissance Generation – The Rise of the Cultural Consumer and What it Means to Your Business, Tipping the Culture: How Engaging Millennials Will Change Things, and Made Possible By: Succeeding with Sponsorship. Most recently, she wrote Will the Future Like You?, published by Karnac Books on March 5, 2026.

== Career ==
Before founding LitLamp Communications in 1995, Martin created the first-of-its kind sponsorship marketing division for the American Library Association. While there, she partnered with Microsoft, where she built the blueprint for what is now the Gates Library Foundation, an initiative Bill Gates believes "History will get right," as his most important legacy.

Martin's first book, Made Possible By: Succeeding with Sponsorship was published in 2003. The information contained in the book is meant to provide guidance for nonprofit organizations in obtaining and maintaining corporate sponsorship. Philanthropy News Digest called it "direct, succinct, and illustrated with concrete examples."

In 2007, Martin published her second book, RenGen:Renaissance Generation – The Rise of the Cultural Consumer and What it Means to Your Business. The book detailed Martin's theory about the RenGen, or Renaissance Generation, an emerging group of individuals who are hungry for innovative ideas and ways to express them. RenGen also refers to a growing cultural movement formed by the confluence of art, education, entertainment and business. According to Martin, a powerful new player is at the center of this RenGen: the cultural consumer. Cultural consumers thrive on information and ideas to fuel their creative self-expression. Martin proposes that as the RenGen gathers force in our civilization, it will change how Americans live and work.

Additionally, in her marketing firm, Martin has conjured a strategy for the Asian tour of the New York Philharmonic, spearheaded a viral Information Privacy initiative funded by George Soros, launched Animal Planet, introduced Dannon products into school lunch rooms nationwide, and re-focused Sun Microsystems’ higher education strategy.

Martin has been interviewed in The New York Times, ABC News, and on NPR. She has been featured in the Wall Street Reporter, Harvard Business Review, Market Watch, the Chicago Tribune, AdWeek, and Advertising Age.

In fall 2008, Martin was selected as the keynote speaker for the Americans for the Arts National Tour sponsored by MetLife. She spoke about the RenGen in 11 cities, including Boston, New York City, Tampa, Chicago, Houston, and Atlanta. She was also named the 2008 Charlotte Kim Scholar of the Year by the Chicago Public Library. She gave the keynote address at the Charlotte Kim Lecture on November 12, 2008.

In late 2009, Martin was named Author in Residence for the "Creative Economy Houston" study in Houston, TX. The study is a collaboration between the Houston Arts Alliance, Greater Houston Partnership, and the University of Houston. While there, Martin "will evaluate the state of Houston's creative economy and gauge its potential for stimulating economic growth by fostering an environment filled with creativity."
