= Academy Drama School =

Drama school in London, England

Coordinates: 51.5185°N 0.0635°W

The Academy Drama School
- Successor: Actor Works
- Founded: 1985
- Founder: Tim Reynolds; Judith Reynolds
- Defunct: January 2007
- Type: Drama school
- Headquarters: London, United Kingdom
- Key people: Tim Reynolds (principal)

The Academy Drama School (often referred to as the Academy) was a British drama school in London, England. It was founded in 1985 and closed in 2007.

== History ==
The Academy was founded by Tim Reynolds and his wife Judith in 1985 as the Evening Academy of Dramatic Art in London, operating first in Oxford Street, but soon at its long-term location in Whitechapel. To serve students without the funds to attend the school full time, they offered the "full-time evening course", a two-year (six-term) programme which enabled students to earn a living from a daytime job while pursuing intensive drama training at the school in the evenings and weekends. This was the core of the school's activities.

Besides the evening course, The Academy offered a one-year (three-term) postgraduate course, a one-year (three-term) drama school access course ("the foundation course") which culminated in a LAMDA Foundation Certificate in Acting (Level 3), and later a one-year (three-term) acting with English course for non-native English speakers. These were all daytime courses. The Academy also offered a variety of shorter courses, some oriented towards amateurs.

The school had a theatre on-site (The Andrew Sketchley Theatre), in which all in-house productions during the training were performed. Those graduating the full time and postgraduate courses presented their final production at a London fringe venue. There was also a showcase staged for these graduates, which was presented to an invited audience of agents and casting directors at a West End theatre, such as the Fortune Theatre and the Duchess Theatre.

Reynolds died in 2006, and the Academy fell into receivership and closed in January 2007.

== Alumni ==
Graduates of the Academy's various courses have gone on to work for such theatre institutions as the Royal Shakespeare Company and the Royal National Theatre, in West End productions, films and television.
