= Anthony Daniels =

British actor and mime artist (born 1946)

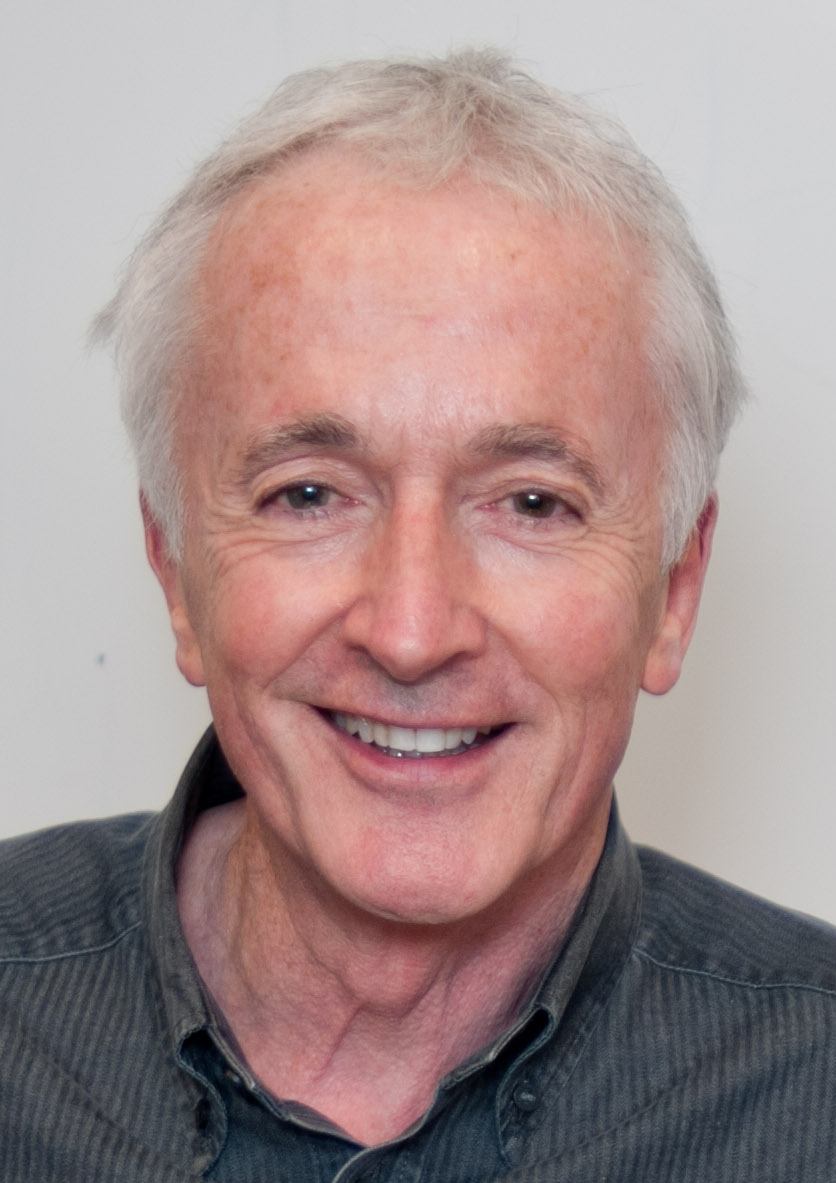
- Daniels in 2011
- Born: 21 February 1946 (age 80); Salisbury, Wiltshire, England
- Education: Rose Bruford College
- Occupations: Actor; mime artist
- Years active: 1974–present
- Known for: C-3PO in Star Wars (1977–present)
- Spouse: Christine Savage
- Website: anthonydaniels.com

Signature
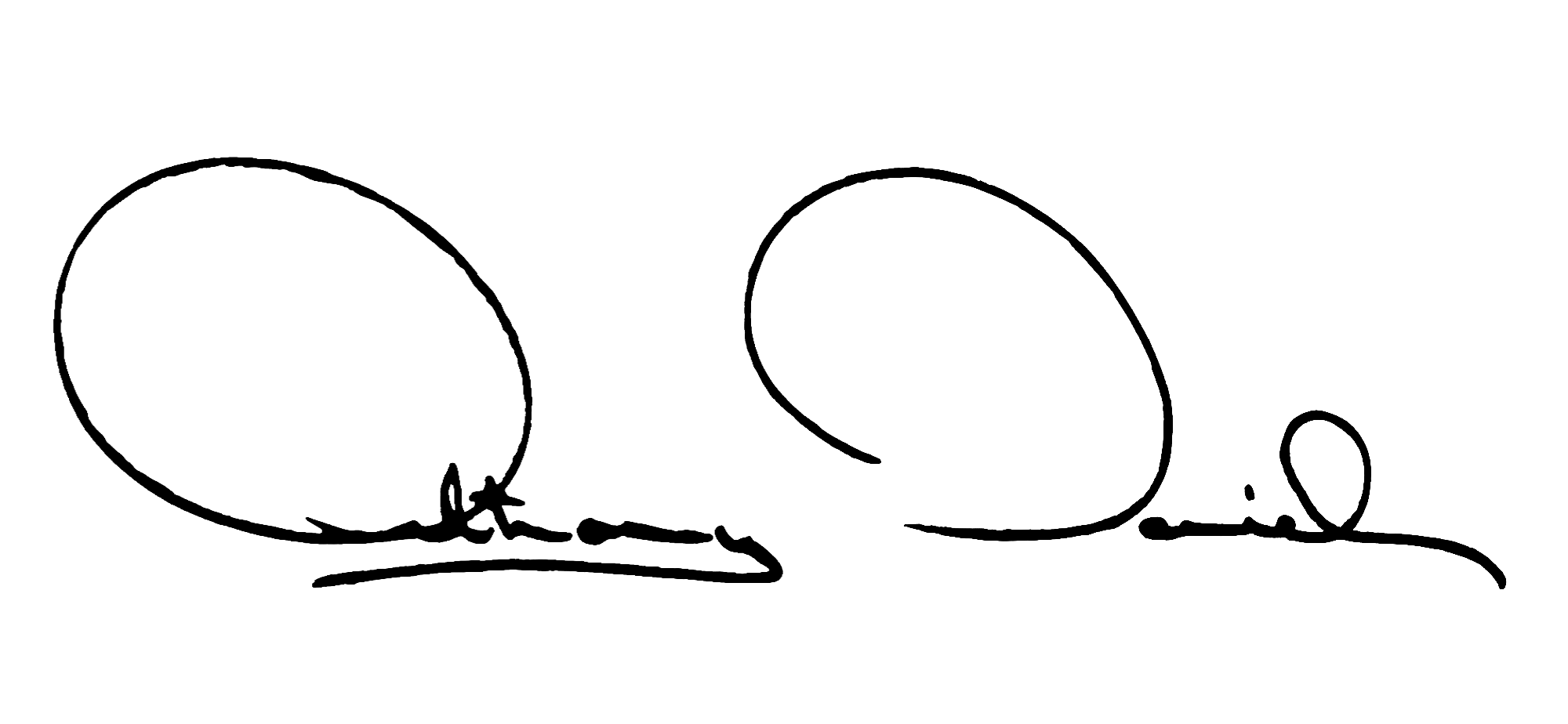

Anthony Daniels (/ˈæntəni/ AN-tə-nee; born 21 February 1946) is a British actor and mime artist, best known for playing C-3PO in 11 Star Wars films, (Note: Every episode of the Skywalker saga, one anthology film and one animated film. He portrayed different characters in two anthology films, Solo and The Mandalorian and Grogu.) from Star Wars (1977) (Note: Released under the title Star Wars in 1977 but later subtitled Star Wars Episode IV: A New Hope to align with the title of the sequel, Star Wars Episode V: The Empire Strikes Back (formerly Star Wars: Chapter II).) to Star Wars: The Rise of Skywalker (2019). He wore the costume and voiced his character in the films and several animated television series. Initially, Daniels did not want to play a robotic character; however Ralph McQuarrie's first concept painting of C-3PO and R2-D2 on Tatooine evoked empathy from him.

For nearly 50 years, Daniels has held the distinction of being the only actor to have either appeared in or been involved with all theatrical films in the series. He has been involved in many of their spin-offs, including television series, video games, and radio serials. His other roles included CZ-3 in Star Wars, Tak in Solo: A Star Wars Story and more. Daniels also portrayed C-3PO in several commercials, non-canon films, including The Lego Movie, and non-canon television shows, including The Muppet Show.

Outside the films, he has narrated and hosted some documentaries (starting off with the 1977 television special, The Making of Star Wars and later Science of Star Wars). Daniels (as C-3PO) has also narrated some documentaries retelling the films. He has hosted several events, including Star Wars: In Concert, since 2009. Daniels has recounted the challenges he faced while filming Star Wars in Tunisia in several documentaries, including Empire of Dreams: The Story of the Star Wars Trilogy. His involvement in the franchise and association with his character from meeting film director George Lucas in November 1975 to wrapping up on The Rise of Skywalker in January 2019 has been detailed in his 2019 memoirs, I Am C-3PO: The Inside Story. As of 2026, Daniels is still continuing his association with the franchise and will be involved in the 50th anniversary in 2027.

Prior to his involvement in the franchise, Daniels appeared in several theatrical productions, including Tom Stoppard's Rosencrantz and Guildenstern Are Dead. He voiced Legolas in Ralph Bakshi's animated adaptation of The Lord of the Rings (1978). He has appeared intermittently on British television in various dramas, including playing a pathologist in Prime Suspect starring Helen Mirren and Colonel Donald Humphries in Holby City. Daniels was an adjunct professor at Carnegie Mellon University's Entertainment Technology Center.

== Early life ==
=== 1946–1975: Education and theatre ===
Daniels was born in Salisbury, Wiltshire, England, the son of a plastics company executive. He regularly attended the theatre with his parents and expressed an interest in acting after seeing Dick Whittington at the age of five. At the age of seven, he watched the 1953 BBC science fiction television series, The Quatermass Experiment and a few years later Doctor Who. Daniels wanted to pursue acting however, his parents persuaded him to study law.

Daniels was educated at Giggleswick School, North Yorkshire and studied law for two years at university. During those two years, he was member of an amateur dramatic society. After receiving encouragement from a teacher, John Law to pursue acting, Daniels dropped out to participate in amateur dramatics and attend Rose Bruford College. He auditioned for a place at London's Central School of Speech and Drama where his future co-star, Carrie Fisher attended. During that time he learned several techniques from acting, improvisation and mime classes. After leaving the college in 1974, Daniels won the annual Carlton Hobbs Award and worked on BBC Radio and for the National Theatre of Great Britain at The Young Vic. He worked with Paul Blake, a future co-star in Star Wars, on his first television job. Daniels appeared in William Shakespeare's Much Ado About Nothing and Macbeth. Daniels portrayed Guildenstern in Tom Stoppard's Rosencrantz and Guildenstern Are Dead. He acted opposite Christopher Timothy who portrayed Rosencrantz. Timothy described Daniels as a dedicated and serious actor. Daniels persuaded Timothy to audition for the part of Han Solo. In December 1975, Harrison Ford was ultimately cast as the character. Daniels took part in the play at the Criterion Theatre in Piccadilly Circus, a week before he flew from London to Djerba to begin filming Star Wars. He was a member of the BBC's Radio Drama Company performing in several of their productions and speaks fluent French.

On 14 November 1975, whilst working in the theatre and appearing in a Young Vic production of Rosencrantz and Guildenstern Are Dead, he was invited to meet director George Lucas in Soho Square, who was casting for Star Wars. Daniels at first turned down the interview but was persuaded by his agent to meet Lucas. Daniels has said that before his role in Star Wars, the only science fiction film he had ever seen in a theatre was 2001: A Space Odyssey in 1968; he was so displeased with the film that he walked out after ten minutes and demanded his money back. After Daniels was cast as C-3PO, Lucas recommended that he watch the film in its entirety to study HAL 9000's voice. In a 2011 interview, Daniels said that he now regards 2001 as a masterpiece and that he also enjoys post-apocalyptic films such as Mad Max. In his 2019 memoirs, he praised the film and said HAL "made a lasting impression" on him.

== Career ==
=== Star Wars ===
==== 1975–1976: Beginnings - Bringing C-3PO to life and filming ====
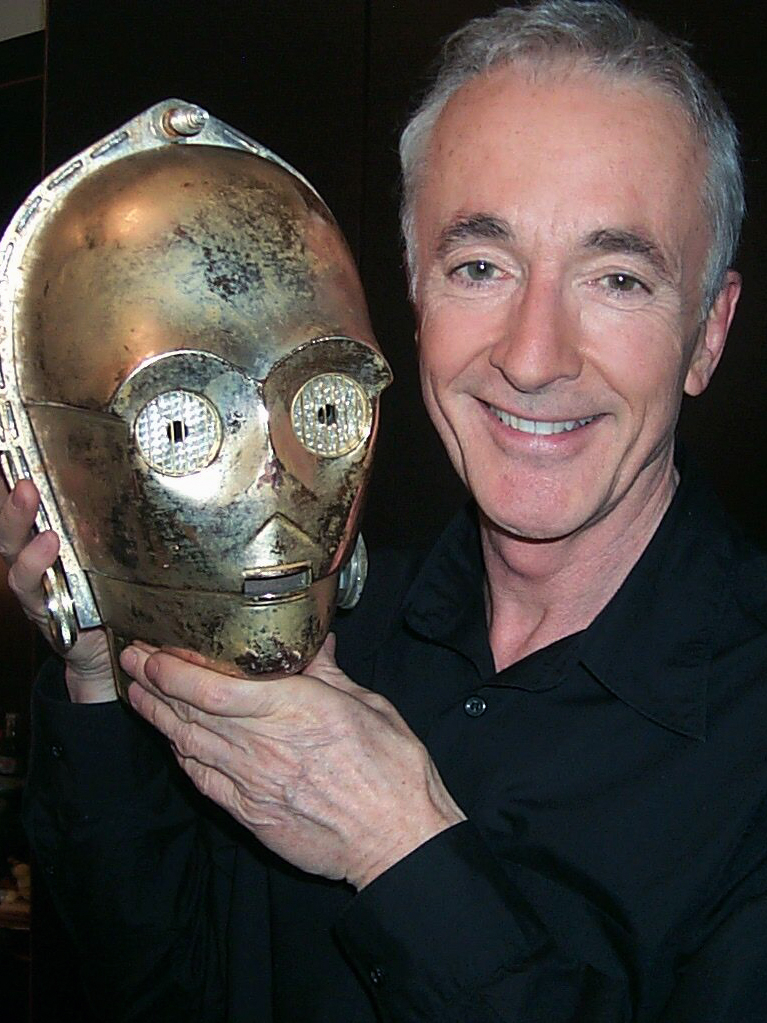
Daniels has portrayed his character in 11 films from 1977's Star Wars to 2019's The Rise of Skywalker

“Standing on a sandy terrain, against a rocky landscape, with distant planets filling the sky, Threepio gazed out forlornly. Our eyes met and he seemed yearning to walk out of the frame into my world. Or I felt, for me to climb over and join him in his. I sensed his vulnerability. Maybe he sensed mine. It truly was a strange moment."

— —Anthony Daniels remembering Ralph McQuarrie's concept painting of C-3PO that launched his association with the character and franchise

In November 1975, after auditioning for the role of C-3PO, Daniels only became fully interested in it after seeing a concept design of the golden droid C-3PO (named C-3 in an early draft) by Ralph McQuarrie; he was moved by the character's forlorn expression. McQuarrie drew his first sketches of the character in 1974 before finishing the painting of C-3PO and R2-D2 walking away from the escape pod in January 1975. Lucas requested C-3PO to look more mechanical and less human. Daniels said, "I sensed his vulnerability." The following day, after reading the script he became interested before Lucas gave him the part the next day. Daniels and Peter Cushing were cast after it was decided that the production would be filmed near London.

In 1976, sculptor Liz Moore finalised the character's design and the Art department modelled the costume on Daniels' body before it was built "from gold-painted fibreglass sheets." The process of making the costume and Daniels' fittings took six months. Brian Muir sculpted finishing work on the full suit including the hand plates. He said, "There was no time to get a plaster cast of Anthony Daniels' hands so I had the unusual job of sculpting directly onto the back of his hands during the lunch break." Prior to filming, Daniels wore the complete costume only once during a test in England. Daniels did not see the final costume until after donning it for the shoot and being shown a Polaroid photograph taken by continuity supervisor Ann Skinner on the first day of filming in Tunisia. While filming scenes for Star Wars in Tunisia, Daniels and the crew were told about Moore's death; she died in a car crash. Daniels mentioned her in several interviews and his memoirs saying, "I will always remember Liz as a most beautiful and kind and creative soul."

On 22 March 1976, his first day of filming took place in Tunisia which provided the setting for Tatooine. (Note: Attributed to multiple references:) Daniels filmed his first scenes at the Lars homestead and they also featured Mark Hamill as Luke Skywalker, Kenny Baker inside R2-D2, Phil Brown as Uncle Owen and several Jawa extras. Daniels' first scene was C-3PO's interaction with Owen Lars. During the first take of a close-up, there were technical difficulties with a misplaced wire and C-3PO's eyes not illuminating. Daniels found the first days of shooting Star Wars challenging because the fiber-glass and aluminium costume was restrictive, physically demanding, took a long time (2 hours) to put on and the "desert could be blistering hot or frigid." Once on set, the costume could not be redesigned. The costume made movements difficult - even the simple ones. Daniels said, "I felt like I was being stabbed with a pair of scissors every time I made a gesture." Due to the costume being uncomfortable, Daniels would wear relevant parts "if C-3PO wasn't fully in a shot." During the scene when a Tusken Raider attacks Luke, Daniels wore his shoes because his feet were not on camera. In between filming, he could not sit down with the costume on, so "the crew put him on a leaning board." At the end of his first day of filming, Daniels was covered in scars, scratches and bruises from the costume; this marked the first and only time he wore the costume for a whole day of filming. (Note: Attributed to multiple references:) Daniels and the crew experienced technical difficulties with a motorised R2-D2 and several scenes "had to be re-shot numerous times because his motors kept playing up and he'd rocket away from everyone". Filming in Tunisia continued up to 4 April 1976. He later chronicled the challenges he faced in further detail in his memoirs.

Following that, Daniels, the cast and crew moved to Elstree Studios in London for interior scenes including the Death Star, the interior of the Lars homestead and interiors of ships (including the Millennium Falcon). The hot summer of 1976 and little air-conditioning made wearing the costume difficult for Daniels. He got in touch with several of his friends including Paul Blake from Rose Bruford College when Lucasfilm sought out actors for the Mos Eisley cantina scene. Blake portrayed bounty hunter Greedo. The scene "where C-3PO had to pick up a comlink to talk to Luke on the Death Star" took 20 takes before sticky pad was placed and hidden in the character's hand. The last scene he filmed was in the sub hallway of Tantive IV when his character follows R2-D2 into the escape pod saying,"I'm going to regret this." As he got into character he described C-3PO as "a kind of English butler, a cross between Laurel and Hardy with his friend."

Daniels also portrayed CZ-3, a protocol droid referred to as "White Pointy Face" in one shot in the original film; the character can be seen wandering in the streets of Mos Eisley spaceport past Luke Skywalker and Obi-Wan Kenobi. CZ-3 also appeared in the sandcrawler but Daniels wore his C-3PO costume. (Note: This character was first identified in the 2014 canon reference book, Star Wars Costumes: The Original Trilogy. Long before that the name CZ-3 was on Decipher character playing card. The character can be seen in the boiler room of Jabba's palace in Return of the Jedi.)

==== Post-production and 1977 release ====
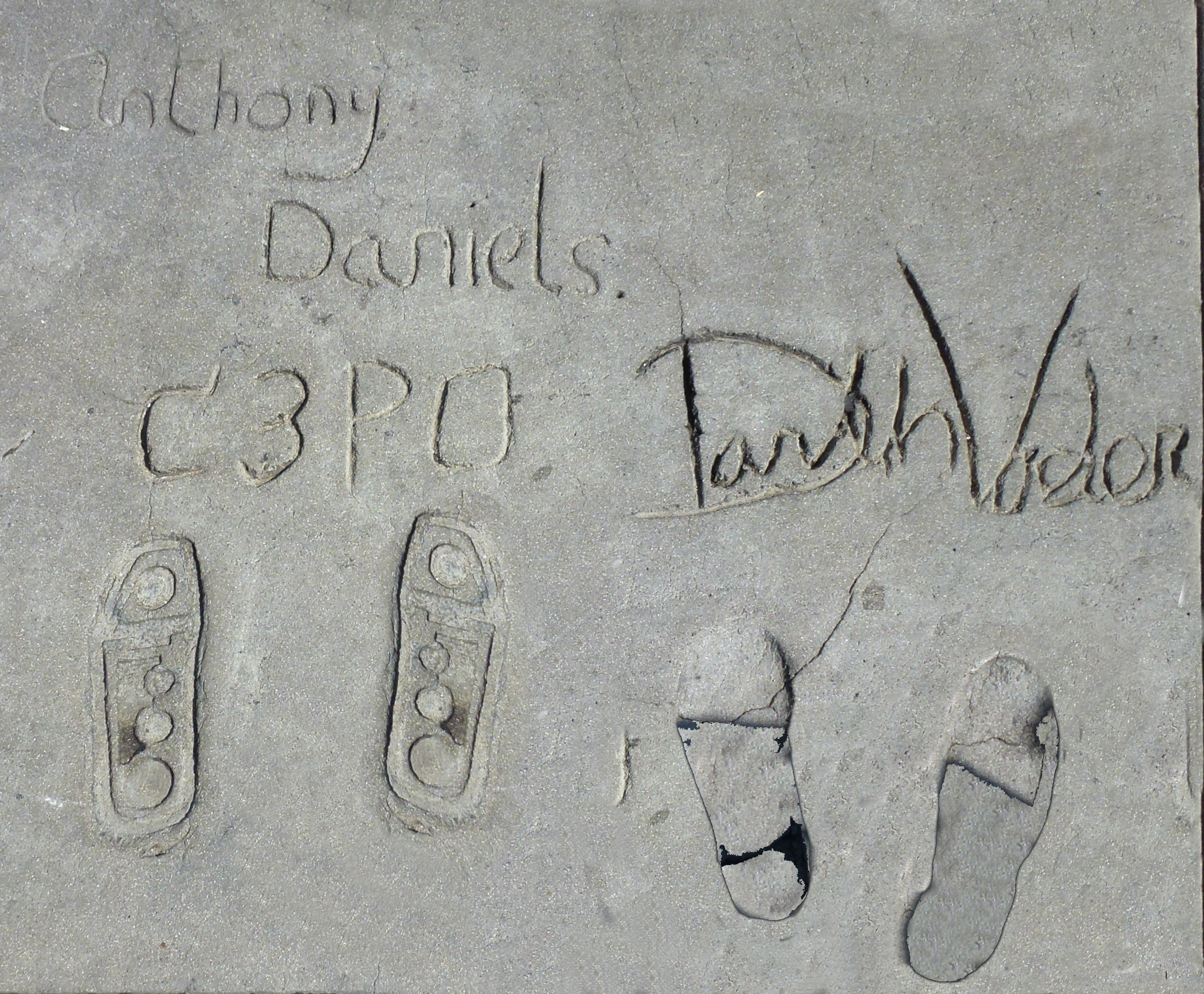
Daniels, C-3PO and Darth Vader's shoeprints on Hollywood Walk Of Fame Hollywood

Daniels struggled with delivering the character's lines until Lucas informed him that they would redub the dialogue in post-production. Initially, Lucas wanted C-3PO "to speak with a Brooklyn accent". (Note: His interview from Star Wars Insider 46 was reprinted in Star Wars: Aliens, Creatures and Droids.) Several actors including Mel Blanc and Richard Dreyfuss auditioned for the voice before it was decided that Daniels would get the part when one of them suggested the idea to Lucas. He flew over to America to record his dialogue in a studio for the finished film across three days. (Note: For the first re-release in 1978, additional dialogue by C-3PO was included, "The tractor beam is coupled to the main reactor in seven locations. A power loss at one of the terminals will allow the ship to leave." This dialogue was omitted in the third re-release in 1981.) Daniels later saw Dreyfuss at the 50th Academy Awards in 1978 noting that he "seemed to have got over any disappointment" he might have experienced not voicing C-3PO.

The release of Star Wars, the first film in the series and fourth chapter of the Skywalker saga, took place in 1977 and received positive reviews. Daniels saw the film at a crew screening in the Dominion Theatre. On 3 August 1977, He wore the costume and added C-3PO's name, hand and footprint in the concrete forecourt at Mann's Chinese Theatre and later requested to add his name. (Note: At the time of the film's release it was called Mann's Chinese Theatre but reverted to its original name, Grauman's Chinese Theatre in 2001.) A remote-controlled R2-D2 and Darth Vader (Kermit Eller) were also there. Daniels narrated and hosted a television special, The Making of Star Wars, the first documentary of the franchise in West Hollywood, California. The television special featured new footage of Daniels as C-3PO and R2-D2 in a starship control room set. Some of the cast members including Mark Hamill, Harrison Ford and Carrie Fisher were interviewed about their involvement in the film but Daniels was not. Following that Daniels and Peter Mayhew reprised their roles in the Donny & Marie Star Wars Special. Both television specials were broadcast in September 1977.

Daniels was later interviewed about his involvement in a 2004 documentary film and shared his memories of McQuarrie's painting as well as the difficulties of his costume in Tunisia. 25 years after the film's release and in an archival interview appearing in a 2007 article, Daniels praised Sir Alec Guinness for his kindness and for helping him get through the challenges he faced during the Tunisia shoot. In the 2002 article, he said, "I firmly believe that I wouldn't have completed that arduous task of shooting without him." In his 2019 memoirs, Daniels described Guinness as "the most generous, gentle host". Guinness spoke praise of Daniels' acting to other people on set. Long before working with Guinness, Daniels watched his performances in The Ladykillers and Lawrence of Arabia. (Note: Daniels filmed scenes for The Rise of Skywalker on location at Wadi Rum where Guinness filmed his scenes for Lawrence of Arabia.)

Jesse Kornbluth of New Times made numerous references to C-3PO and Paul Scanlon of Rolling Stone said that the droids "practically steal the film" however they made no references to Daniels. Daniels was depressed with his lack of recognition after the film's successful release; he attributes this to Lucasfilm wanting audiences to believe that the droids were real and not actors in costumes. He said, "I was not allowed to be a part of it and it took me many, many years to begin to feel a part." In 2019, Daniels told RadioTimes.com that due to being inside a full-body costume "the anonymity of it was always a struggle." In the same year, he told BBC Radio 5 Live that he felt "rejected, redacted and ignored" when he was left out of the publicity of the first film. On the other hand, in a 2009 article appearing in Star Wars Insider, he said while his character "is known throughout the world" but he is not, being inside a full-body costume allowed him to have privacy.

Daniels' involvement in the film was finally acknowledged when he discovered a Trivial Pursuit card asking what part he played in Star Wars. Daniels later acknowledged the audience's enthusiasm for the franchise in his memoirs saying that without them, "A New Hope would have been the beginning - and the end." The success and cultural impact of Star Wars launched a multimedia franchise, leading to further sequels rounding out the original trilogy, another two trilogies, three standalone films, one animated film, re-releases, television shows, documentaries, commercials, radio series, video games, concerts, conventions, exhibitions, events, a theme park ride and themed plane which continued Daniels' association for the next six decades. When discussing The Force Awakens, he said it was George Lucas' ideas that Star Wars was not the first page of the story and that used and broken down characters would indicate they have back stories. Future filmmaker, J. J. Abrams would reuse these ideas in The Force Awakens.

==== 1978–1983: Sequels, television and commercials ====
In 1978, Mark Hamill, Daniels (as C-3PO) and R2-D2 presented Special Sound Oscars for Close Encounters of the Third Kind and Star Wars at the 50th Academy Awards. Daniels appeared in the live-action segments of the 1978 Star Wars Holiday Special, set between the events of Star Wars and the yet to be released sequel. The TV special was broadcast only once, on CBS TV on 17 November 1978. It received negative reviews however, it eventually became a cult classic among Star Wars fans - when bootleg recordings were uploaded to the internet. In 1980, Daniels made a guest appearance as C-3PO in The Muppet Show, The Stars of Star Wars; the crossover episode also starred Mark Hamill as Luke Skywalker, Peter Mayhew as Chewbacca and R2-D2. They filmed scenes at ATV Studios in January 1980. Following that Daniels joined the cast of Sesame Street. Filming lasted a week and he said, "I had the most memorable time.". His favourite scene was when C-3PO tries to explain to R2-D2 that his "new short girlfriend" is actually "a fire hydrant." On 29 April 1980, Daniels (as C-3PO) attended John Williams' first concert as official conductor of the Boston Pops orchestra. He later added a photograph of his character "below his own photograph in his passport" when he made more appearances as C-3PO abroad.

Daniels starred in 1980's The Empire Strikes Back, the second theatrically released film in the series. It was the highest grossing film of the year and is regarded as the best film in the series even following numerous re-releases and a reassessment. It is also considered by the audience to be the most significant chapter in the Skywalker saga. His costume was less uncomfortable and this time it consisted of 11 parts instead of 20. The assistant art director Fred Hole and his team made the costume more flexible allowing more freedom of movement. Initially, Daniels was hesitant about reprising his role however, he eventually agreed to return for a higher salary and "had grown fond of" his character. The confinements of the cockpit of the Millennium Falcon made filming difficult for Daniels, Ford, Fisher and Mayhew. He said that C-3PO is "not a hero, but he does have functions that are spoken of and which the movie should use." Daniels also said that he 'felt [his character] had humanity.' New members of the cast included Billy Dee Williams and Daniels described him as a "seasoned and charismatic actor".

Daniels' involvement in the film was acknowledged when his name was included on the poster. He was included in the publicity events in Los Angeles however, his illness forced him to miss the premiere screening at the Kennedy Center, Washington on 17 May 1980. A week later, Daniels returned to London. In the same year, he wrote a Star Wars themed anti-smoking public service announcement; the PSA featured C-3PO and R2-D2 warning children about the negative effects of smoking. Daniels also appeared in a Star Wars Underoos commercial and television movie documentary, The Making of 'The Empire Strikes Back'. Some footage from the documentary and an audio commentary from Daniels was included in the 2020 featurette, Celebrating 40 Years of Empire: Behind the Scenes.

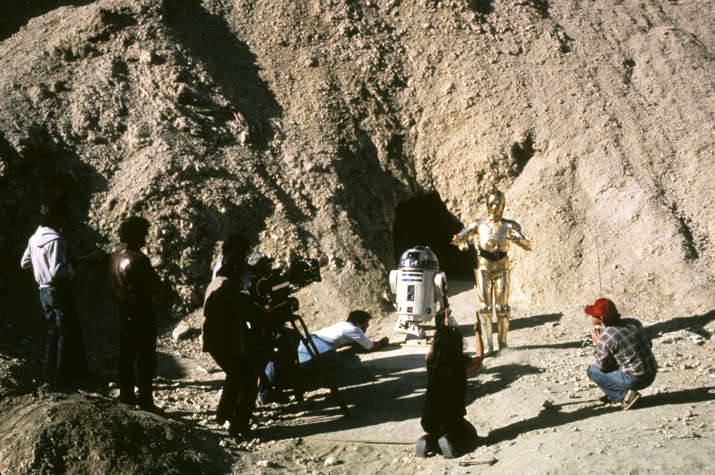
Daniels and film crew filming Return of the Jedi in Death Valley, California

1983's Return of the Jedi was the last installment in the original trilogy and highest-grossing film of the year. Prior to the release of the film, Daniels appeared as C-3PO in the unreleased 1982 mockumentary film, Return of the Ewok. This mockumentary was filmed during the production of Return of the Jedi. Daniels can be seen in a scene with Mayhew as Chewbacca, a remote controlled R2-D2 and Warwick Davis in his Wicket costume asking them for directions to Jabba's palace at Elstree Studios. He can also be seen negotiating with co-producer Robert Watts "for a dressing room for himself and R2-D2" before Warwick switches him off. Daniels previously appeared with Michael Carter (Bib Fortuna) in a theatre production. Daniels, the cast and crew experienced difficulties on the set of Jabba's palace. In a 2013 interview for Star Wars Insider, Daniels described the set of Jabba's palace as "claustrophobic and dark". A crew member held a padded board for Daniels to fall onto when C-3PO was knocked over by Jabba but received an injury from C-3PO's elbow.

During filming for Jedi, Daniels was asked to prepare miming stories of the first two films "and up to that point, Return of the Jedi." He established several parallels between Guildenstern and C-3PO. Daniels said, "I really did like Jedi, but only because I got to play God for a day, with little adoring furry creatures." Following the end of production on Jedi, he witnessed two crew members making a bonfire of the Millennium Falcon due to it being expensive to store and rescued some pieces including a bundle of wires from the Falcon's corridors. Daniels filmed several scenes for the original trilogy at Elstree Studios where his costume fitting also took place. From 1989 to 2021, every film of the original trilogy was selected by the United States Library of Congress for preservation in the National Film Registry.

==== 1983–1990: Post-Star Wars original trilogy projects ====
Following Return of the Jedi's release, he appeared in two television documentaries, Classic Creatures: Return of the Jedi and From Star Wars to Jedi: The Making of a Saga. Daniels reprised the role for various promotional work such as advertising for Star Wars-licensed products such as Kenner toys and a 1984 Kelloggs breakfast cereal commercial promoting C-3PO's cereal. He also appeared as C-3PO alongside R2-D2 in the 1984 television special, Donald Duck's 50th Birthday. Their scene ended with C-3PO sending Donald Duck and the voice actor, Clarence Nash birthday greetings.

Initially, Daniels thought that Jedi marked the end and that Lucas "wasn't going to make any more Star Wars films." In 1983, when discussing his role in Jedi, Daniels said Jedi gave the original trilogy a sense of closure with "no leftovers" and indirectly mentioned the potential prequels saying, "if there's anymore they're go back in time." A few years later an animated television series spin off from the original trilogy, the 1986 Hands Across America fundraising event with Robin Williams and theme park ride would continue his association with C-3PO before Lucas decided to create the prequel trilogy in the 1990s. Daniels attended the first sponsored Star Wars convention in May 1987 celebrating the first ten years of the franchise. An interview with Daniels was featured in the first issue of The Lucasfilm Fan Club Magazine (later rebranded as the Star Wars Insider). He made an appearance as C-3PO in the 1990 The Magical World of Disney episode, Disneyland's 35th Anniversary Special. C-3PO and R2-D2 can be seen with Miss Piggy and Gonzo in a segment of the episode; the Muppet characters previously appeared with the droids in the 1980 Star Wars crossover episode of The Muppet Show.

Kenny Baker, who played R2-D2 in the Skywalker saga and attended several conventions (until his death in 2016), said in several interviews that he and Daniels did not get along. (Note: Attributed to multiple references:) Daniels admitted his relationship with Baker did not match their on-screen relationship. Despite this, he acknowledged Baker's enthusiasm in his memoirs saying Baker loved his association with the franchise, R2-D2 "and the fans" and was popular with them. Daniels also described Baker's waddling as R2-D2 into the escape pod in A New Hope as "especially memorable" and detailed how Baker operated the R2 unit he could fit inside. In an earlier interview, Baker expressed optimism that if he and Daniels were both involved in the prequel trilogy they would "have an opportunity to get to know each other better" despite not being close friends during their involvement in the original trilogy.

==== 1978–2027: Voice work, radio and writing ====
Daniels' first C-3PO voice work (in animation) was the animated segment (Note: Released on Disney+ on April 2, 2021, under the name The Story of the Faithful Wookiee.) of the Star Wars Holiday Special. The animated segment received favourable reviews. He voiced C-3PO in the 1980 Christmas-themed Christmas in the Stars album. Daniels voiced C-3PO in the Star Wars radio serial based on the original trilogy starting off with 1981's Stars Wars to 1996's Return of the Jedi. Daniels is the only cast member of the original Star Wars trilogy to voice his character in all three parts of NPR's dramatisations of the trilogy; Hamill voiced his character in the first two parts and Joshua Fardon voiced Luke Skywalker in the third part. The radio series expanded the original trilogy by incorporating new scenes. Brian Daley scripted a scene between C-3PO and Boba Fett in Jabba's palace however, Daniels rejected the idea insisting the two characters should not be on friendly terms. Fett was replaced by Arica (Mara Jade (Note: Her first appearance was in Timothy Zahn's Legends novel Heir to the Empire (1991).) in disguise) from Timothy Zahn's Tales from Jabba's Palace. He contributed the foreword to the collected scripts of the Return of the Jedi radio drama, as their author Brian Daley died while they were being recorded.

Daniels voiced C-3PO for six animated series: Droids, Clone Wars, The Clone Wars, Rebels, (Note: Droids in Distress and the first six films are retold by C-3PO (voiced by Daniels) in the 2015 animated television mini-series, Lego Star Wars: Droid Tales) Forces of Destiny (Note: This episode is tied to a deleted scene from The Empire Strikes Back when C-3PO tears away a warning sign off the door of a room filled with Wampas hoping that the snowtroopers would mistake it for another room - while Han and Leia are fleeing Imperial troops. This deleted scene was included in the 1979 trailer for Empire and on the 2011 Blu-ray release and can be seen on Disney+.) and Resistance. (Note: After the canon was rebooted in 2014, Droids and Clone Wars were discarded from the canon. Both of them and The Story of the Faithful Wookiee are included in the Vintage collection on Disney+. All of the six animated series listed are placed within the Skywalker saga timeline.) 13 episodes of Droids were broadcast in 1985, then the following year, the one-hour television film, The Great Heep was broadcast on ABC. Daniels said it "was my favorite episode. Ben has a particular affection for me as C-3PO and natural empathy toward R2-D2." Daniels voiced C-3PO in 2008's The Clone Wars. While the film received negative reviews, the television series of the same name that followed received praise for the character's development, story arcs and animation. Daniels said, "In particular, under the expert and creative direction of Dave Filoni, the animation in Clones was exceptional." Some of his archival audio from the Skywalker saga was reused in the animated micro-series Star Wars Galaxy of Adventures retelling key moments from the films.

Daniels has voiced C-3PO in numerous non-canon Lego Star Wars shorts, animated series and video games including Lego Star Wars: The Force Awakens. He also voiced a bounty hunter version of C-3PO in Lego Star Wars: Rebuild the Galaxy (2024-2025). The animated television mini-series explores alternate versions of established characters from the franchise in a rebuilt galaxy. The director Chris Buckley said, "Anthony wanted to lean in on the bounty hunter, bad guy C-3PO idea for Pieces of the Past". Daniels decided that C-3PO should "pronounce R2-D2's name as "AAARRRR2-D2" since his character was associating with pirates. Daniels, Hamill and Billy Dee Williams were the only members of the cast from the original trilogy to voice alternate versions of their characters. He has also voiced his character in several video games including 1997's Monopoly Star Wars, 2009's The Force Unleashed - Ultimate Sith Edition, 2020's virtual reality Star Wars: Tales from the Galaxy's Edge and 2026's Monopoly: Star Wars Heroes vs. Villains. Daniels is reprising his role for 2027's Star Wars Funday Football.

Daniels also provided the narration and all character voices for the audio books Dark Force Rising and The Last Command. The audio books were based on Timothy Zahn's Thrawn trilogy. Daniels' other Star Wars-related writings include the Wonder Column for Star Wars Insider magazine several stories for the comic book series, Star Wars: Droids and a comic book adventure for C-3PO and R2-D2 entitled The Protocol Offensive, published by Dark Horse Comics.

==== Star Tours ====
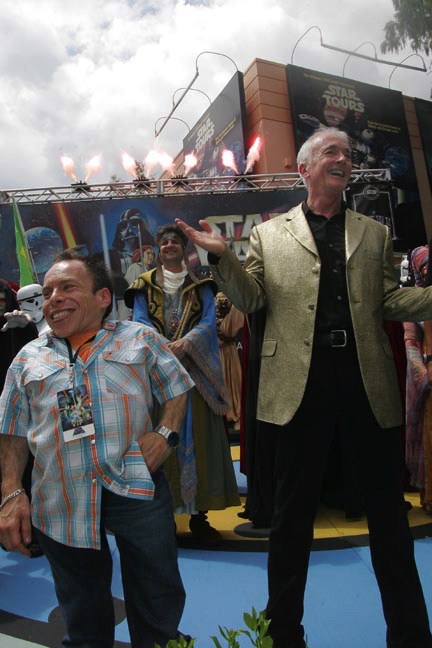
Daniels (right) with fellow Star Wars actor Warwick Davis (left) at Star Wars Weekends in 2007

Daniels' other C-3PO voice work included Disney theme park attractions, Star Tours and its successor, Star Tours: The Adventures Continue. Prior to the opening of the ride at Disneyland California on 9 January 1987, he and Tom Fitzgerald recorded the 12 minute performance. On 13 January 1990, the third Star Tours attraction opened in the new Disney/MGM Studios theme park. Daniels, Lucas, Mark Hamill and Carrie Fisher attended the opening. Daniels recorded his lines in French for Star Tours in Disneyland Paris. (Note: The ride opened on 12 April 1992 and closed on 16 March 2016.) In a 1999 interview for Star Wars Insider, he said, "I think Star Tours is wonderful, and the people at Disney are just magic to work with."

In 2010, he was involved in the Star Tours shutdown ceremony as a part of Disney's Hollywood Studios' "Last Tour to Endor" event at Star Wars Celebration V in Orlando, Florida. (Note: Including the film Raiders of the Lost Jedi Temple of Doom: A Fan Film of Epic Proportions created with audience participation at Indiana Jones Epic Stunt Spectacular!, which was modified to include Star Wars characters; Daniels also appeared in a parade the same weekend at part of the park's "Star Wars Galactic Nights".) The Star Tours: The Adventures Continue attraction opened at Disney's Hollywood Studios on 20 May 2011. Following the opening ceremony, Daniels, Lucas, Walt Disney president and CEO, Bob Iger took the first official ride and their Starspeeder was filled with several characters from the franchise. Daniels also appeared with Daniel Logan, Dave Filoni, Ashley Eckstein and James Arnold Taylor at the 2011 Star Wars Weekends event.

The Star Tours ride film was updated with storylines from the prequel trilogy and later the sequel trilogy. The updated Star Tours ride was set earlier in the timeline before the original ride so it required a new captain. Fitzgerald came up with several ideas and characters before deciding to use an existing character inside of designing a new one. He met Daniels in London saying, "You've got a bigger part - much bigger!" C-3PO replaced Captain Rex as pilot of the Starspeeder and Daniels recorded his dialogue. Daniels described Star Tours as "the best ride of his life" in his memoirs. Footage of Daniels appeared in the 2021 Disney+ documentary, Behind the Attraction Star Tours episode. This episode focuses on the origins of the attraction and how it evolved since 1987.

==== 1997–2005: Original trilogy special editions and Star Wars prequel trilogy ====
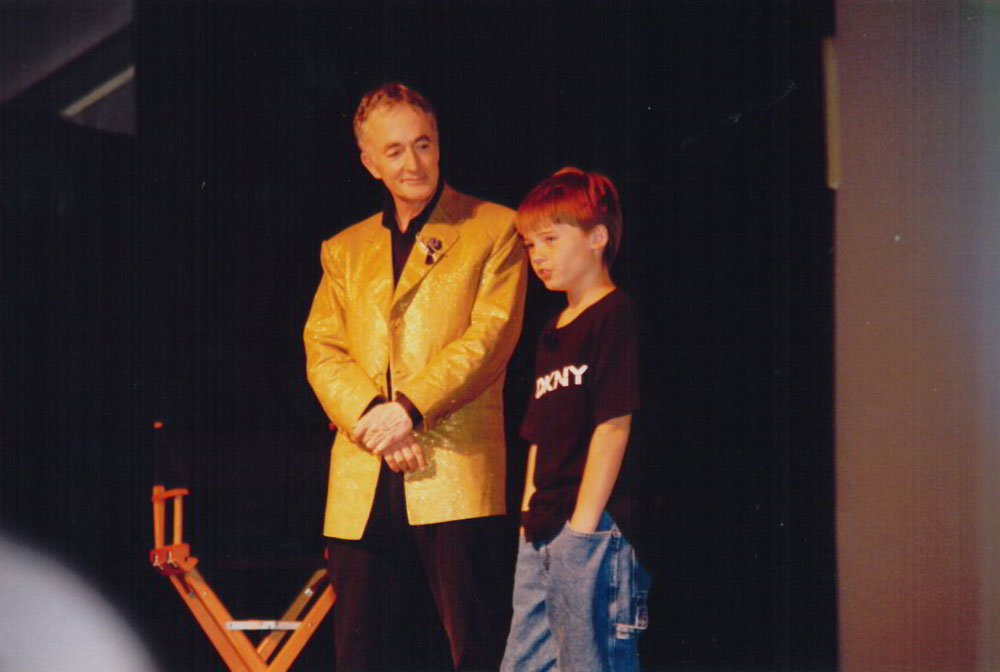
Daniels (left) with Jake Lloyd (right) at the first Star Wars Celebration in 1999

In 1997, Daniels hosted the 20th anniversary special editions of the original trilogy. One of the changes included his scene with Hamill in the landspeeder; Lucas found a way to make it hover convincingly and replace the efforts to disguise the wheels. Daniels reflected that the audience's thoughts about the changes in the special editions were somewhat divided despite further advancements in technology and digital improvements. He appeared in the television documentary special, Star Wars: The Magic and the Mystery.

Later that year, filming for the first instalment of the prequel trilogy started at Leavesden Studios. There, George Lucas told him that his character was created by one of the protagonists, Anakin Skywalker while discussing the plot line of the first prequel. Initially, Daniels thought it was Sir Alec Guinness' character before remembering his co-star portrayed Obi-Wan "Ben" Kenobi, not Anakin Skywalker. He continued to speak highly of Guinness' professionalism, kindness and encouragement during filming A New Hope and was saddened upon hearing of his death in 2000. He acknowledged that Guinness preferred to be remembered for his earlier career on stage and film, not his role as Obi-Wan. Daniels acted opposite Ewan McGregor, Hayden Christensen, Natalie Portman and Samuel L. Jackson in the prequel trilogy. He said that McGregor and Jackson "exclaimed their childlike disbelief at working with See-Threepio."

In Episode I: The Phantom Menace, Daniels only voiced the character, which a puppeteer, Michael Lynch built and played on set. While some of the younger versions of established characters were portrayed by new cast members, Daniels, Baker, Frank Oz and Ian McDiarmid were the only actors from the original trilogy who reprised their roles in the film. Daniels collaborated with Dan Madsen organising the first Star Wars Celebration in Denver Colorado which celebrated the upcoming release of The Phantom Menace. Daniels organised finding guests and planned the stage sessions. He also attended the Celebration as a guest. The film was released to cinemas in May 1999; Daniels saw it in Salt Lake City. Initially reviews were mixed however the film became the highest grossing film of 1999 and the highest-grossing Star Wars film at the time of its release. In a 1999 interview for Star Wars Insider, he said that he "enjoyed [the film] immensely". Following a reappraisal of the prequel trilogy, Daniels said, "To be fair, the years have been kinder to this, the first Prequel. Many, who were young at the time still hold it." He defended Ahmed Best saying that the criticism he faced over his portrayal of Jar Jar Binks "was beyond cruel." In his memoirs, Daniels said that Darth Maul is still one of his favourite characters in the saga - despite his limited appearance in the film.

A few months after the release of The Phantom Menace, development began on the sequel in March 2000 and filming began on 26 June 2000 at Fox Studios, Sydney, Australia. Daniels attempted to puppeteer the skeletal C-3PO himself on location in Tunisia in Episode II: Attack of the Clones, but after the script was changed with the character wearing coverings, he returned to playing the droid in costume. This marked the first time Daniels filmed scenes in Tunisia since 1976. One of his gold outfits was painted to depict C-3PO's coverings being rusted. In this film and 2005's Episode III: Revenge of the Sith, the last instalment in the prequel trilogy, he also performed the vocal tracks for scenes that featured a computer-generated C-3PO. The film performed well at the box office becoming the fourth-highest-grossing film of 2002. Although Christensen faced criticism for his performance, Daniels praised him describing him as "such a hero, and [a] terrific, clever actor."

“I had a few moments while shooting Revenge of the Sith that took me back to my childhood, and both were filming with Anthony Daniels. Being on that set with C-3PO made me remember what it was like to be seven years old and watching the original films, and I felt the excitement of being in the prequels."

— —Ewan McGregor on filming scenes with Anthony Daniels for Revenge of the Sith

By the time Attack of the Clones was released to cinemas in May 2002, work began on the final film of the prequel trilogy. On 23 April 2003, it was announced that Daniels, Baker and Mayhew would reprise their roles in Revenge of the Sith. He wore the gold suit again. Daniels and the crew experienced technical difficulties while filming Revenge of the Sith; during one rehearsal the green screen was reflected on his costume but would later be retouched during post-production. The neck part of his costume was re-created by Droid supervisor Don Bies which made it more comfortable. On 24 July 2003, after Daniels finished filming in the hallway of the Alderaan starcruiser, Lucas said, "This is it, the end of the movie. Not the exact end, but the end for you for another twenty years." (Note: A reference to C-3PO appearing on Tantive IV at the beginning of A New Hope set nineteen years after Revenge of the Sith.) It was the last film to be distributed by 20th Century Fox. The film received positive reviews and was the second-highest-grossing film in the franchise at the time. He had the first line in the original trilogy and the last line in the prequel trilogy both on Tantive IV. Daniels witnessed Christensen in his Darth Vader costume on set. He said, "I've lived with Darth Vader for years, but there was something about Hayden being in the costume.... He had a presence." In a 2014 article, Daniels said he did not like "being replaced by a digital version" of his character and C-3PO being partially CGI in some scenes in the prequels. In his 2019 memoirs, he praised Christensen and McGregor for their lightsaber duel describing them as "marvellous."

Daniels also makes cameo appearances as a humanoid in two scenes of the feature films. His character, Lieutenant Dannl Faytonni, (Note: A portmanteau of Daniels' and a post-production crew member, Fay David's names.) a con man, appears in the nightclub scene early in Attack of the Clones as a man in blue uniform who can be seen in a cutaway reaction shot after Obi-Wan Kenobi disarms the bounty hunter Zam Wesell. (Note: This character was identified in the 2016 canon reference book, Star Wars: Complete Locations. According to Daniels, Faytonni has his own biography.) This marked the first time Daniels portrayed a human (as well as a droid) in a Star Wars film. Daniels told Ahmed Best "that they were going to let [him] reveal [his] face" in the film so Best decided to take part in the scene as well and portrayed an Outlander Club patron, Achk Med-Beq. (Note: According to Daniels, both Faytonni and Med-Beq were a criminal partnership.) Faytonni can also be seen at the Galaxies Opera House in Revenge of the Sith.

==== 2000–2005: Exhibitions and documentaries ====
In 2000, Daniels hosted The Art of Star Wars exhibition at the Barbican Centre. He called Kathleen Holliday, the then Lucasfilm Director of Special Projects asking if the 501st Legion could take part in the opening. The exhibition included costumes, props, paintings and drawings from the original trilogy and The Phantom Menace and this marked the first time C-3PO was on display. In 2002, he was guest at the opening of Star Wars - The Magic of Myth.

Daniels appeared in the 2001 mockumentary, R2-D2: Beneath the Dome. The mockumentary features fake interviews from some of the cast (including Daniels) and crew of Attack of the Clones and footage to tell the "life story" of R2-D2. Daniels (as C-3PO) and R2-D2 hosted 2002's Star Wars: Connections, a series of videos chronicling the connections between the prequels and original trilogy in the lead-up to the theatrical release of Attack of Clones and 2004's The Story of Star Wars, a documentary special retelling the previously released films to promote Revenge of Sith. (Note: As Star Wars: Connections and The Story of Star Wars was produced and broadcast in 2002 and 2004 respectively, it contains no scenes from Revenge of the Sith nor the further changes that were added to the 2004 DVD release of the original trilogy.) Both of them featured new footage of C-3PO and R2-D2 focusing on the journeys of Anakin and Luke Skywalker. Daniels was featured in the 2004 documentary, Empire of Dreams: The Story of the Star Wars Trilogy. The documentary was created for the first DVD release of the original trilogy in September 2004. The following year, he hosted the documentary, Star Wars: Heroes & Villains, which coincided with the release of Revenge of the Sith. The documentary focuses on several heroes (including C-3PO) and villains from the first six films. Initially, Daniels thought that his last day of filming Revenge of the Sith marked the end. (Note: For a long time George Lucas insisted that Star Wars was meant to be a six part saga and that there was no story beyond that. Initially he planned a nine-part saga however, his plans drastically changed after The Empire Strikes Back was released and cancelled further sequels. After finishing work on Return of the Jedi, Daniels thought that Lucas' "once planned trio of trilogies was going to remain just the one." He also thought that Return of the Jedi "seemed to be it, as far as movies went.") However he continued to voice his character in several television shows after 2005 (starting off with The Clone Wars), host Star Wars related events and would appear in more live-action Star Wars films after Lucas sold the franchise to Disney in 2012.

==== 2005–2015: Tours, commercials and new film ====
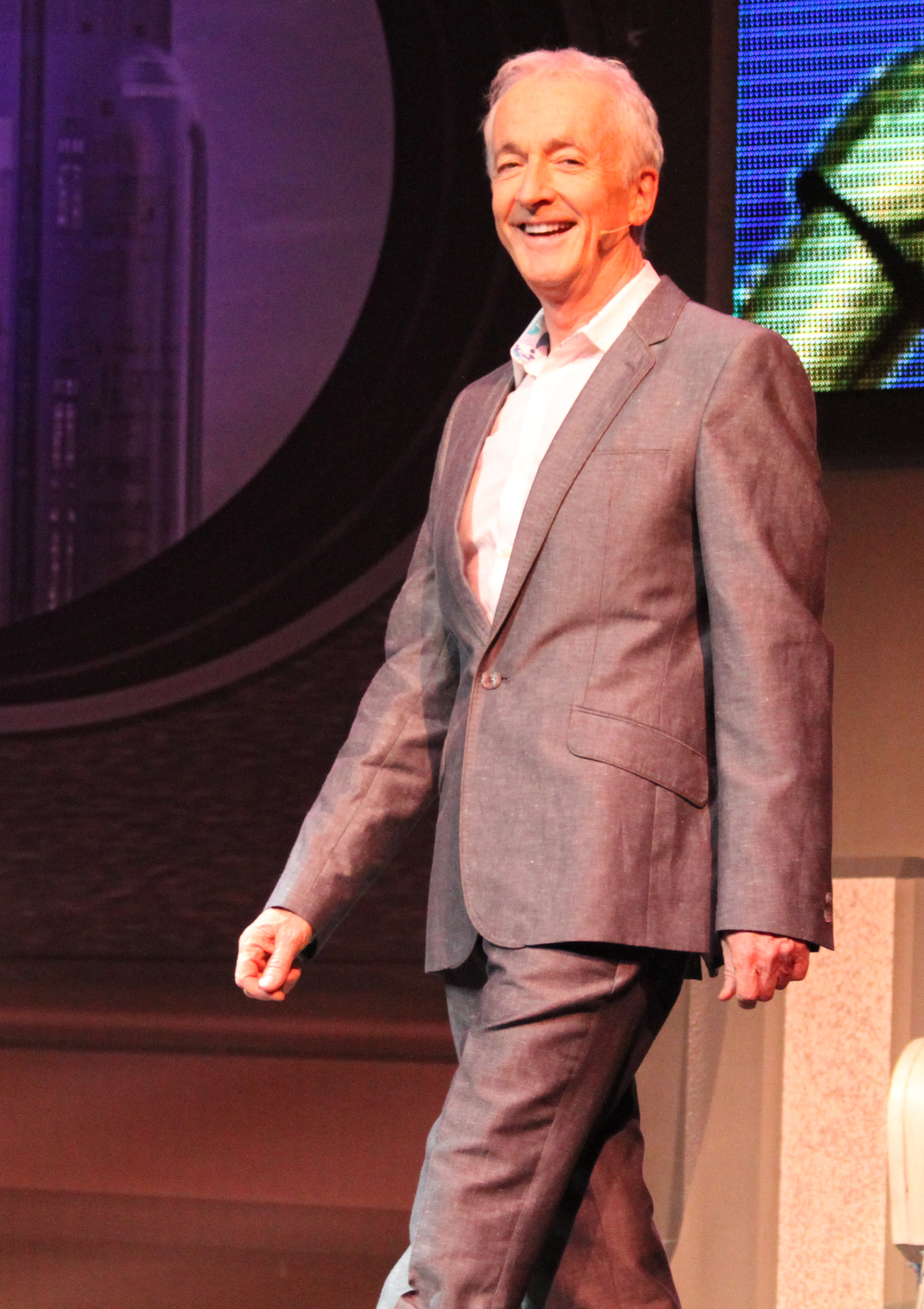
Daniels in May 2011

Following the theatrical release of Revenge of the Sith, Daniels hosted Star Wars: Where Science Meets Imagination. The travelling exhibition created by the Museum of Science, Boston opened on 27 October 2005. It featured several costumes, props and models including C-3PO and focussed on real-world science associated with the films. Daniels also wrote the introduction for the book accompanying the exhibition.

In 2009, Daniels hosted the Star Wars: In Concert (Note: Previously referred to as Star Wars: A Musical Journey. There was a selection of compositions from The Phantom Menace to Return of the Jedi.) tour in North America. He also hosted and narrated the concert at the O2 Arena in London which debuted on 10 April 2009. The concert featured an orchestra, choir and large LED screens displaying footage from the films. He described hosting the concert as "the best job [he] ever had" in the opening of his memoirs. In a 2009 article appearing in Star Wars Insider, Daniels was convinced that there would be more Star Wars related projects in the future saying, "They keep coming up with different things, but that's because everybody wants to see more Star Wars!"

The following year, he reprised his role in a TV campaign for Dixons. The commercial showed C-3PO and R2-D2 breaking into the store during the night and exploring some of the products. In October 2012, the Walt Disney Company acquired Lucasfilm and announced that Episode VII would be released in 2015. Daniels found out about this in a newspaper while on a ferryboat. Long before Disney acquired the franchise, as well as appearing as C-3PO in several Disney related programmes and his involvement with Star Tours, Lucasfilm arranged for Hamill to show Daniels around Disneyland. Daniels said, "And how quaint to think that neither of us could ever have foreseen the major connection that was waiting for us."

In April 2014, it was announced that Daniels would join the cast of the first instalment of the Star Wars sequel trilogy. J.J. Abrams oversaw the cast including Daniels read through the script of Episode VII at Pinewood Studios. He voiced C-3PO in the 2014 animated film, The Lego Movie alongside other crew members (including Lando Calrissian voiced by Billy Dee Williams) of the Millennium Falcon. Daniels watched the film in New York describing it as "ingenious". The film received praise for the humour and was named one of the top-ten films of 2014. He once visited the Lego factory in Denmark and said, "I was fascinated by the witty-looking robots that stamped out multicolored blocks of plastic". Daniels received a twenty inch Lego model of C-3PO from Michael Donovan and Michael Price.

Daniels appeared in the 2014 BBC documentary series, Tomorrow's Worlds: The Unearthly History of Science Fiction and discussed his experience playing C-3PO. Daniels said that one of the questions he gets asked most is, "Is it hot in the costume?" He also discussed why the franchise has been successful across generations. He attributed this to Lucas drawing inspiration from a variety of myths, legends and stories as well as Star Wars providing the audience escapism and moving away from the grim tone of earlier films of the 1970s. In November 2015, Daniels hosted Star Wars and the Power of Costume.

==== 2015–2019: Star Wars sequel trilogy ====
Daniels acted opposite some of his co-stars (including Carrie Fisher) from the original trilogy again and new cast members including Daisy Ridley, John Boyega and Oscar Isaac in the sequel trilogy. Daniels reprised his role as C-3PO in the seventh Star Wars film, The Force Awakens, which was released in December 2015. It was the first live-action Star Wars film to be distributed by Walt Disney Studios Motion Pictures. The film received positive reviews, was the highest grossing film of 2015, grossed $2.07 billion worldwide and became the third-highest grossing film at the time of its release.

J. J. Abrams, the director of The Force Awakens, told Daniels that he was only going to be the voice of C-3PO in the film, but changed his mind and decided Daniels would wear the suit in the film as well. Abrams made a new C-3PO suit (with David Merryweather in charge of the redesign) for Daniels to wear during filming using 3D printing instead of fiberglass that allowed Daniels a great deal more mobility and comfort than the original suit and took less time to get into. Daniels has stated his displeasure with the droid's red arm. Abrams insisted that the red arm would show a back story since The Force Awakens is set 30 years after Return of the Jedi. Daniels revealed that it was George Lucas' idea for C-3PO's light silver left leg in A New Hope to show the character "had a history" and to make the audience think that something happened in the past. When Star Wars Insider asked Daniels about reprising his role in The Force Awakens, he said it was possible to be involved in all seven films because while C-3PO is human inside, his "permanently friendly expression" on the outside has been consistent with his first appearance in 1977's A New Hope and has connected with the audience across three generations. Daniels later read the 2016 one shot Marvel comic, Star Wars: C-3PO #1. (Note: Subtitled The Phantom Limb. This story takes place before the events of The Force Awakens and explains how C-3PO obtained his red arm.) He described it as "a story of loyalty and understanding." Daniels voiced C-3PO in the 2016 non-canon TV mini-series, Lego Star Wars: The Resistance Rises. (Note: The events take place after Star Wars: C-3PO #1 and set before the events of The Force Awakens.)

“When I first read the script, it was great to see C-3PO have real purpose, to be very involved and part of a team. On my final day of shooting it was very moving, a very bittersweet moment. Making these movies has been hard work, but it has also been fun and a great joy for me. I have been in Star Wars since day one out in Tunisia in 1976, so it has been quite something to have survived this long. It has been quite a ride".

— —Anthony Daniels as he is wrapping up on The Rise of Skywalker

Daniels also appeared as C-3PO in 2017's The Last Jedi, and 2019's The Rise of Skywalker, the last two instalments of the Skywalker saga. While the former received praise from critics and was the highest-grossing film of 2017, the latter received mixed reviews. He filmed several scenes for the sequel trilogy at Pinewood Studios. During the filming of the Casino sequence in The Last Jedi, Daniels was involved in Droid School and helped the waiter droid actors. In a 2017 article, he said he thought about retiring but would not. Sandstorms in Jordan made filming scenes for The Rise of Skywalker difficult for Daniels. He suggested to Abrams that C-3PO should be given a "meaningful end". Abrams said to Daniels, "not on my watch." This suggestion was not materialised and the character ultimately survived. Daniels' last day of filming took place on Monday 28 January 2019 and finished with a speech from Abrams before Daniels gave one of his "third ending". He was featured in the 2020 documentary, The Skywalker Legacy. The documentary included interviews with the cast of the original trilogy as well as the cast (including Daniels) and crew of The Rise of Skywalker.

Prior to the release of The Rise of Skywalker, Daniels was asked how he would describe C-3PO. He replied, "A teller of truth. He’s the observer. He’s the objective eye." He also said that, "It was great to see C-3PO have real purpose." Daniels insisted that his character is not cowardly and is aware what danger is about. When discussing The Force Awakens, Daniels said that due to C-3PO being "programmed to make people feel comfortable", the character would opt for a quiet life over space travel, battles and drama he does not like. When discussing The Last Jedi, he said C-3PO's role is to act "as a little foil to all the drama that happens". In an interview about the Star Wars: In Concert tour for Star Wars Insider, he included Rey's theme as one of his favourite pieces from the franchise saying “[The theme] absolutely captures Rey's youthfulness". The Rise of Skywalker concluded the Skywalker saga however, Daniels' involvement with the franchise would continue.

==== 2016–2026: Anthology films and further involvement ====
Outside the Skywalker saga, Daniels appeared in a cameo as C-3PO in 2016's Rogue One, the first standalone film in the Star Wars anthology series. (Note: The events of Rogue One take place immediately before A New Hope, the first Star Wars film Daniels appeared in.) Prior to filming, film director Gareth Edwards met Daniels expressing enthusiasm for him to make an appearance in his film. Daniels filmed scenes for the hangar bay on Yavin 4 at Cardington. Merryweather added more refinements to the costume. Daniels attended the premiere of Rogue One at Tate Modern. The film received positive reviews, grossed $1 billion worldwide and was the second highest-grossing film of 2016. Daniels praised the film in his memoirs but echoed the journalist's criticism of the digital recreation of a younger Carrie Fisher as Princess Leia "begging her not to turn around" when he watched the film. However, he was delighted by the audience's reaction when C-3PO made his surprise cameo appearance in the film.

After coming up with an idea to the producers of either appearing as an extra or making a cameo, Daniels made an appearance as Tak, a con artist working in the spice mines of Kessel in the second anthology film, Solo: A Star Wars Story. He filmed his scenes at Pinewood Studios. This marked the first time Daniels did not portray C-3PO in a Star Wars film. Solo received positive reviews however, its box-office performance put standalone films on hold until 2026's The Mandalorian and Grogu. Daniels voiced Air Traffic Control droids in the film; it is unknown if he will be involved in 2027's Star Wars: Starfighter.

Daniels also voiced C-3PO's cameo appearance in the 2018 film Ralph Breaks the Internet. His character can be seen entering the dressing room and informing the Disney princesses that a "Which Disney Princess Are You?" quiz is about to start in five minutes. He made cameos as C-3PO in Obi-Wan Kenobi and Ahsoka. Daniels is the only actor to act and been involved in all nine films of the Skywalker saga, three live-action anthology films, the Star Wars Holiday Special, the 2008 Clone Wars film, the related television series and several TV series and specials (animated and live-action). (Note: Attributed to multiple references:) (Note: Droids, Clone Wars, LEGO Star Wars: The Padawan Menace and The Empire Strikes Out, Rebels, Droid Tales, The Resistance Rises, Forces of Destiny, Resistance, The Lego Star Wars Holiday Special, Terrifying Tales, Summer Vacation, Obi-Wan Kenobi, Ahsoka, Rebuild the Galaxy and Rebuild the Galaxy: Pieces of the Past.) His Star Wars related film, television, documentary, music, games and miscellaneous projects up to 2019 can be seen in the Droidography (a portmanteau of "droid" and "filmography") section of his memoirs.

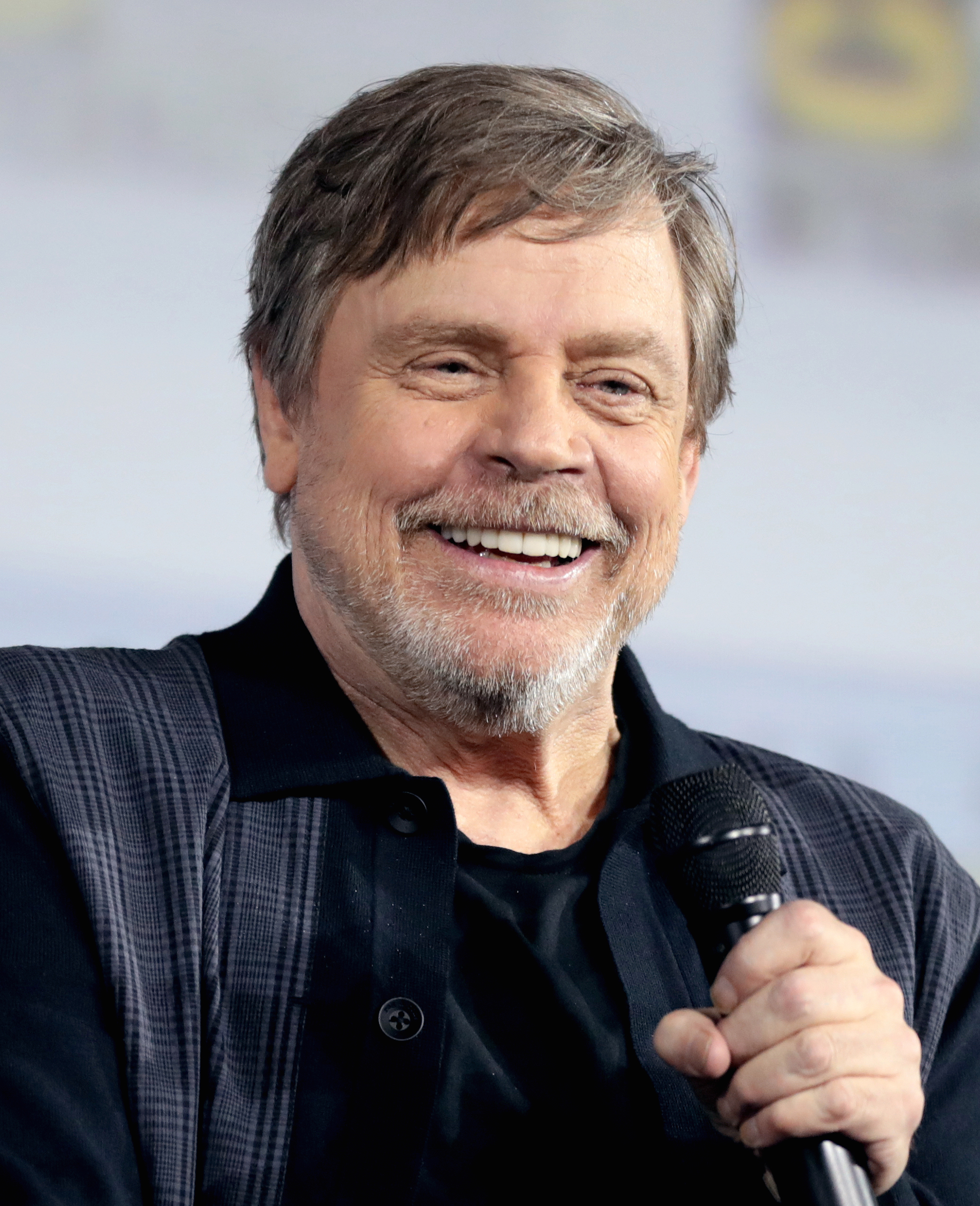
Daniels and his co-star, Mark Hamill (pictured in 2019) have appeared together in six films and numerous media in the franchise from 1977's Star Wars to 2025's LEGO Star Wars: Rebuild the Galaxy: Pieces of the Past.

In March 2017, All Nippon Airways introduced a Boeing 777 modelled after C-3PO into service. Daniels attended the ANA booth at Star Wars Celebration Europe in 2016 where the design of the model was unveiled and signed it. He also attended the aircraft's unveiling and signed the front door on the left-hand side. It was retired on 9 January 2026. The ANA Star Wars project having begun in 2015 ended on 31 March 2026. ANA gave him a four feet long model version of the plane.

In 2024, Daniels auctioned off some of his collection including the head-piece he wore. He reprised his role in the 2024 animated short, How NOT to Draw R2-D2 which was narrated by Mark Hamill. Series creator and executive producer, Gino Guzzardo said, "As Anthony Daniels got into character, he actually performed with his whole body." In November 2024, Daniels hosted Star Wars in Concert at Los Angeles; it included compositions from every film of the Skywalker saga. In January 2026, he hosted new Lego Smart Play Star Wars sets which included a new Smart C-3PO minifigure at the Nuremberg Toy Fair.

Daniels has attended several conventions as part of Star Wars Celebration as a guest since 1999 and has been sharing memories of his experience working on the franchise with the audience during panels. He made a gold jacket for the first Celebration event as a reference to his character. Daniels attended Star Wars Celebration Japan in April 2025. He said that he gets the phrase from different generations of the audience, "Thank you for my childhood" and hears their memories of watching Star Wars. Daniels described fans as "gentle admirers."

Daniels praised the 501st Legion describing it as a "magnificent organisation", acknowledging the positive impact the group has on others and expressed amazement that some members of the 501st and R2-D2 Builders Club created their own replica C-3PO costumes (as well as R2-D2 and other astromech droids in the franchise). Long before the club was established in 1999, Daniels watched John Stears and his team create the first R2 units at Elstree Studios in 1975.

==== 2027: 50th anniversary ====
In April 2026, it was announced that Daniels would attend the Star Wars Celebration Los Angeles in 2027, marking 50 years since his first appearance in the franchise. He will also host Star Wars in Concert: The Skywalker Saga at the Hollywood Bowl where the first official Star Wars concert took place in November 1977.

=== Other acting roles ===
Daniels voiced Legolas in Ralph Bakshi's animated adaptation of The Lord of the Rings (1978) starring Sir John Hurt as Aragorn. The animated film received mixed reviews from critics but was a financial success. Daniels was the first Star Wars actor to appear in a Lord of the Rings adaptation; several actors including Sir Christopher Lee (Note: Daniels did not film scenes with Lee in the prequel trilogy but talked with him in between filming. He described Lee as "a real bastion of cinema history.") from the prequel trilogy appeared in the live-action adaptation. In 1980, he portrayed Gordon Whitehouse in J. B. Priestly's Dangerous Corner.

Daniels has appeared intermittently on British television in various dramas, notably in a recurring role in Prime Suspect starring Helen Mirren. He also played the priest in the British spoof horror film I Bought a Vampire Motorcycle (1990). Initially, the film received criticism but later received more favourable reviews. Daniels also portrayed Colonel Donald Humphries in Holby City. He portrayed François in one of The Young Indiana Jones Chronicles television films, Attack of the Hawkmen. The television show is set before the events of the Indiana Jones films. Daniels' costar, Harrison Ford portrayed the titular character. Several of his costars from Star Wars also appeared in Holby City and The Young Indiana Jones Chronicles.

=== Other work ===
"The saga is unlike any other story in popular culture. From the moment, in 1977, when audiences ducked down as that Star Destroyer roared overhead, it has enchanted fans around the planet. Children and parents have been absorbed into a global family for whom the saga has become part of their own history and tradition."

— -Daniels talking about the impact of the franchise in the foreword of Ultimate Star Wars New Edition, 2019

Daniels was an adjunct professor at Carnegie Mellon University's Entertainment Technology Center teaching technology and software and giving lectures on robot history. (Note: Attributed to multiple references:) In 2004, Daniels attended Robot Hall of Fame for his character's induction. (Note: A few years later, in 2006, Maria was inducted. This humanoid robot from 1927's Metropolis inspired Ralph McQuarrie's original designs for C-3PO. Daniels described Maria as "Threepio's pin-up.") This led to his employment as a professor at the research university. He has also worked as a presenter and producer of conferences and trade events and creative designer. Daniels shared his fascination of stage management in his memoirs.

He wrote the foreword for the DK reference book, Ultimate Star Wars (2015 and 2019 editions). While the 2015 edition coincided with the release of The Force Awakens, the 2019 edition was published as part of the Journey to Star Wars initiative leading up to the release of The Rise of the Skywalker and was an updated edition of the 2015 edition.

=== 2019: I Am C-3PO: The Inside Story ===
His autobiography, I Am C-3PO: The Inside Story, was published in the United Kingdom in hardback on 31 October 2019 before the first United States hardback edition was published on 5 November 2019 by DK. The Signed Collector's Edition was published in hardback on 12 December 2019 and included three exclusive printed cards as well as personal commentaries by Daniels. The UK paperback edition was published by DK on 5 November 2020. He had previously considered using the title Telling the Odds. According to an interview, while filming The Rise of Skywalker, Abrams suggested that Daniels "should write a book." Two days later, Daniels asked Abrams if he would write the foreword; Abrams replied, "I'd be honored." In the foreword, Abrams said, "While I suspected that bringing Threepio to life was harder than it looked, experiencing it first-hand gave me an instant, newfound respect for the man with the golden eyes." Daniels decided that his memoirs would focus on his involvement with the Star Wars franchise as well as the impact of his character.

On 13 April 2019, Daniels revealed the title and book cover during the Star Wars Celebration in Chicago. He told RadioTimes.com that he "wanted to give a slightly rounder picture of what it was like, what it is like, what it has been like”. Abrams described the book as "Gloriously witty, keen and spirited". The book detailed the origins of Daniels' acting career and how George Lucas' ideas, Ralph McQuarrie's paintings, Liz Moore's character designs and the art department's work led to the creation of his character - as well as his experience (the positives and negatives) and portrayal of C-3PO from 1977's Star Wars to 2019's The Rise of Skywalker. The book also detailed the publicity and how the franchise had an impact on Daniels' life and the audience. Prior to the publication of the book in the United Kingdom and United States, Star Wars Insider issue 193 featured an interview with Daniels about his book as well as his career.

Daniels expressed confidence that the audience's enthusiasm and love for his character would allow C-3PO to continue without him. In a 2019 article, he said, "Threepio is too good a character to cease to exist, so after I’m gone there will be somebody carrying the torch." Daniels also narrated an audio edition of his book with Abrams narrating his foreword; the audio book features a selection of John Williams' music from the films.

== Filmography ==
=== Film ===
Year	Title	Role	Notes	Ref.
1977	Star Wars	C-3PO (Note: In the end credits of the theatrical version of Star Wars, the character's name is spelled without the hyphen (C3PO).); CZ-3	Also known as A New Hope	
1978	Bruges-la-Morte	Pierrot		
1978	The Lord of the Rings	Legolas Greenleaf; Deagol	Voice; uncredited as Deagol	
1980	The Empire Strikes Back	C-3PO		
1982	Return of the Ewok	C-3PO	Short video; unreleased	
1983	Return of the Jedi	C-3PO		
1990	I Bought a Vampire Motorcycle	Priest		
1999	Star Wars: Episode I – The Phantom Menace	C-3PO	Voice (Note: Daniels provided the voice of the character, whilst puppeteer, Michael Lynch operated the skeletal C-3PO.)	
2002	Star Wars: Episode II – Attack of the Clones	C-3PO; Dannl Faytonni		
2005	Star Wars: Episode III – Revenge of the Sith	C-3PO; Dannl Faytonni		(Note: Attributed to multiple references:)
2008	Star Wars: The Clone Wars	C-3PO	Voice	
2014	The Lego Movie	C-3PO	Voice; cameo	
2015	Star Wars: The Force Awakens	C-3PO		
2016	Rogue One: A Star Wars Story	C-3PO	Cameo	
2017	Star Wars: The Last Jedi	C-3PO		(Note: Attributed to multiple references:)
2018	Solo: A Star Wars Story	Tak	Cameo	(Note: Attributed to multiple references:)
2018	Ralph Breaks the Internet	C-3PO	Voice; cameo	
2019	Star Wars: The Rise of Skywalker	C-3PO		
2026	The Mandalorian and Grogu	Air Traffic Control droids	Voice	

=== Television ===
Year	Title	Role	Notes	Ref.
1977	Donny & Marie	C-3PO	1 episode, uncredited	
1978	Star Wars Holiday Special	C-3PO	TV special	
1979	Turning Year Tales	John	Episode: "Dear Harriet"	
1980	The Muppet Show	C-3PO	Episode: "The Stars of Star Wars"	
1980	Sesame Street	C-3PO	4 episodes	
1981	Multi-Coloured Swap Shop	C-3PO; Himself	1 episode	
1984	The Country Diary of an Edwardian Lady	Kenneth	7 episodes	
1984	Donald Duck's 50th Birthday	C-3PO	TV special short	
1985	Star Wars: Droids	C-3PO	Voice; 13 episodes	
1986	The Great Heep	C-3PO	TV movie	
1987	Three Up Two Down	Rupert Fairfax	Episode: "Mirror Mirror on the Wall"	
1988–89	Square Deal	Julian	3 episodes	
1990	The Magical World of Disney	C-3PO	Voice; Episode: "Disneyland's 35th Anniversary Celebration"	
1992	The Bill	Richard Lee-Ward	Episode: "Stoning the Glasshouse"	
1995	Prime Suspect	Pathologist	"Inner Circles" and "The Lost Child", TV movies	
1995	The Famous Five	Professor Dobson	Episode: "Five on a Secret Trail"	
1995	The Young Indiana Jones Chronicles	François	Episode: Attack of the Hawkmen	
1997	Star Wars: Droids – The Pirates and the Prince	C-3PO	Voice; Video (Note: It is a feature length compilation of four episodes Daniels previously voiced in Droids: The Lost Prince, The New King, The Pirates of Tarnoonga and The Revenge of Kybo Ren.)	
2001	Urban Gothic	Mr Tidyman	Episode: "Serotonin Wild"	
2001	R2-D2: Beneath the Dome	Himself	TV Short, uncredited	
2002	Star Wars: Connections	C-3PO	TV Short	
2004	Holby City	Colonel Donald Humphries	Episode: "In the Line of Fire"	
2004	Ghosts of Albion Embers	Lord Nelson	Voice; TV movie	
2007	Micro Safari: Journey to the Bugs	MAL	Voice	
2004–05	Star Wars: Clone Wars	C-3PO	Voice; 4 episodes	
2008–11	Star Wars: The Clone Wars	C-3PO	Voice; 11 episodes	
2010	Robot Chicken: Star Wars Episode III	C-3PO	Voice; TV movie	
2011	Lego Star Wars: The Padawan Menace	C-3PO	Voice; TV movie	
2012	Lego Star Wars: The Empire Strikes Out	C-3PO	Voice; TV movie	
2012–13	Dirigible Days	Narrator	Voice; Also executive producer; 5 episodes	
2013–14	Lego Star Wars: The Yoda Chronicles	C-3PO	Voice; 6 episodes	
2014	Star Wars Rebels	C-3PO	Voice; Episode: "Droids in Distress"	
2015	Lego Star Wars: Droid Tales	C-3PO	Voice; 5 episodes	
2016	Lego Star Wars: The Resistance Rises	C-3PO	Voice; Episode: Poe to the Rescue	
2017	Star Wars Forces of Destiny	C-3PO	Voice; Episode: "Beasts of Echo Base"	
2018	Star Wars Resistance	C-3PO	Voice; Episode: "The Recruit"	
2020	The Lego Star Wars Holiday Special	C-3PO	Voice; TV movie	
2022	Obi-Wan Kenobi	C-3PO	Cameo; Episode: "Part I"	
2022	Lego Star Wars: Summer Vacation	C-3PO	Voice; TV movie	
2023	Ahsoka	C-3PO	Episode: "Part Seven: Dreams and Madness"	
2024	How NOT to Draw	C-3PO	Voice; 1 episode: "R2-D2"	
2024	Lego Star Wars: Rebuild the Galaxy	C-3PO	Voice; 3 episodes	
2025	Lego Star Wars: Rebuild the Galaxy: Pieces of the Past	C-3PO	Voice; 2 episodes	
2027	Star Wars Funday Football	C-3PO	Alternate Star Wars broadcast for the National Football League's Super Bowl LXI	

=== Documentary ===
Year	Title	Role	Notes	Ref.
1977	The Making of Star Wars	C-3PO; Host	TV movie documentary	
1978	50th Academy Awards	C-3PO; Presenter	TV special	
1980	The Making of 'The Empire Strikes Back'	C-3PO; Himself	TV movie documentary	
1983	Classic Creatures: Return of the Jedi	C-3PO; Himself	TV movie documentary	
1983	From Star Wars to Jedi: The Making of a Saga	C-3PO; Himself	TV movie documentary	
1997	Star Wars: The Magic and the Mystery	C-3PO; Himself	TV movie documentary	
2004	Empire of Dreams: The Story of the Star Wars Trilogy	C-3PO; Himself	Video documentary	
2004	When Star Wars Ruled The World	C-3PO; Himself	TV movie documentary	
2004	The Story of Star Wars	C-3PO	Video documentary	
2005	Science of Star Wars	C-3PO; Himself	TV documentary miniseries 3 episodes	
2005	Star Wars: Feel The Force	C-3PO; Himself	TV movie documentary	
2005	Star Wars: Heroes & Villains	C-3PO; Himself	Documentary	
2014	Tomorrow's Worlds: The Unearthly History of Science Fiction	Himself	TV documentary series	
2016	The Oscars	C-3PO; Himself	TV special	
2020	The Skywalker Legacy	C-3PO; Himself	Video documentary	
2021	Behind the Attraction	C-3PO; Himself	Disney+ TV documentary series Episode: Star Tours; Archive footage	
2022	Icons Unearthed: Star Wars	C-3PO; Himself	TV documentary miniseries	

=== Radio ===
Year	Title	Role	Ref.
1981	Star Wars	C-3PO	
1983	The Empire Strikes Back	C-3PO	
1996	Return of the Jedi	C-3PO	

=== Theatre ===
Year	Title	Role	Venue	Notes	Ref.
1975–1976	Rosencrantz and Guildenstern Are Dead	Guildenstern	Criterion Theatre	West End	
1980	Dangerous Corner	Gordon Whitehouse	Ambassadors Theatre	West End	

=== Theme park attractions ===
Year	Title	Role	Notes	Ref.
1987	Star Tours	C-3PO	Uncredited; also provides the voice in the French dub	
2011	Star Tours – The Adventures Continue	C-3PO	Uncredited	

=== Video games ===
Year	Title	Role	Notes	Ref.
1997	Monopoly Star Wars	C-3PO	Also writer	
1999	Star Wars: Pit Droids	C-3PO		
2008	Star Wars: The Clone Wars – Jedi Alliance	C-3PO		
2008	Star Wars: The Clone Wars – Lightsaber Duels	C-3PO		
2009	Star Wars: The Force Unleashed – Ultimate Sith Edition	C-3PO		
2015	Disney Infinity 3.0	C-3PO		
2015	Star Wars Battlefront	C-3PO		
2016	Lego Star Wars: The Force Awakens	C-3PO		
2016	I Expect You to Die	Daniel Sans		
2020	Star Wars: Tales from the Galaxy's Edge	C-3PO		
2021	Star Wars: Tales from the Galaxy's Edge- Last Call	C-3PO		
2022	Lego Star Wars: The Skywalker Saga	C-3PO		
2026	Monopoly: Star Wars Heroes vs. Villains	C-3PO		

== Discography ==
- The Story of Star Wars (1977)
- Christmas in the Stars: Star Wars Christmas Album (1980)

== Print sources ==
=== Books ===
- Arnold, Alan (1980). Once Upon a Galaxy: A Journal of the Making of The Empire Strikes Back. Sphere Books. ISBN 9780722156520.
- Bray, Adam (2019). Ultimate Star Wars New Edition (Hardback) (2nd ed.). London: DK. ISBN 9780241357668.
- Cooper, Christopher, ed. (2025). Star Wars: Revenge of the Sith The 20th Anniversary Special Edition (Hardback ed.). London: Titan Magazines. ISBN 9781787746725.
- Cooper, Christopher; Wilkins, Jonathan, eds. (2025). Star Wars: The Force Awakens The 10th Anniversary Special Edition (Hardback) (1st ed.). London: Titan Magazines. ISBN 9781787746732.
- Daniels, Anthony (2019). I Am C-3PO: The Inside Story (Hardback ed.). London: DK. ISBN 9780241357606.
- Ferrari, Alessandro (2025). Star Wars: The Original Trilogy - A Graphic Novel (Paperback ed.). Panini Publishing Ltd. ISBN 9781804913123.
- Goodwin, Archie (2015). Star Wars: Episode V - The Empire Strikes Back (Hardback) (1st ed.). Marvel. ISBN 9780785193678.
- Hearn, Marcus (2005). The Cinema of George Lucas (Hardback ed.). New York: Harry N. Abrams, Incorporated. ISBN 9780810949683.
- Rinzler, J.W (2005). The Making of Star Wars: Revenge of the Sith (Paperback ed.). London: Ebury Press. ISBN 9780091897376.
- Rinzler, J.W (2007). The Making of Star Wars (Hardback) (1st ed.). Ebury Press. ISBN 9780091920142.
- Rinzler, J.W (2010). The Making of The Empire Strikes Back (Hardback ed.). London: Aurum. ISBN 9781845135553.
- Rinzler, J.W. (2013). The Making of Return of the Jedi (Hardback) (1st ed.). London: Aurum. ISBN 9781781310762.
- Rodley, Ed, ed. (2005). Star Wars: Where Science Meets Imagination (Hardback ed.). USA: National Geographic Society. ISBN 9780792241836.
- Smith, Jim (2003). George Lucas (Paperback ed.). London: Virgin Books Ltd. ISBN 9780753507551.
- Trott, Lloyd, ed. (2015). Actors and Performers Yearbook 2016: Essential Contacts for Stage, Screen and Radio. London: Bloomsbury Publishing.
- Wilkins, Jonathan, ed. (2016). The Best of Star Wars Insider Volume 1 (Paperback) (1st ed.). London: Titan Books. ISBN 9781785851162.
- Wilkins, Jonathan, ed. (2016b). The Best of Star Wars Insider Volume 2 (Paperback) (1st ed.). London: Titan Books. ISBN 9781785851179.
- Wilkins, Jonathan, ed. (2016c). The Best of Star Wars Insider Volume 4 (Paperback) (1st ed.). London: Titan Books. ISBN 9781785851902.
- Wilkins, Jonathan, ed. (2017). Star Wars: A New Hope The Official Celebration Special (Hardback ed.). London: Titan Magazines. ISBN 9781785864605.
- Wilkins, Jonathan, ed. (2018). The Best of Star Wars Insider Volume 7: Icons of the Galaxy (ebook). Titan Books. ISBN 9781785856013.
- Wilkins, Jonathan, ed. (2018b). Star Wars: The Last Jedi The Official Movie Companion (Hardback ed.). London: Titan Magazines. ISBN 9781785863004.
- Wilkins, Jonathan, ed. (2019). Star Wars: Aliens, Creatures and Droids (Paperback) (1st ed.). London: Titan. ISBN 9781785851964.
- Wilkins, Jonathan, ed. (2019b). Star Wars: The Rise of Skywalker The Official Collector's Edition (Hardback ed.). London: Titan Magazines. ISBN 9781785863035.
- Wilkins, Jonathan, ed. (2021). Star Wars: The Empire Strikes Back The 40th Anniversary Special Edition (Hardback ed.). London: Titan Magazines. ISBN 9781787734234.
- Wilkins, Jonathan, ed. (2021b). Star Wars: The Skywalker Saga The Official Collector's Edition (Hardback ed.). London: Titan Magazines. ISBN 9781787734661.
- Wilkins, Jonathan, ed. (2024). Star Wars: Return of the Jedi The 40th Anniversary Special Edition (Hardback ed.). London: Titan Magazines. ISBN 9781787740792.
- Wilkins, Jonathan, ed. (2024b). Star Wars Insider Presents The Dark Side Collection (Hardback ed.). London: Titan Magazines. ISBN 9781787744516.
- Windham, Ryder (2007). Star Wars The Ultimate Visual Guide: Special Edition (Hardback ed.). London: Dorling Kindersley. ISBN 9781405318686.
- Windham, Ryder; Vilmur, Peter (2009). The Complete Vader (Hardback ed.). London: Simon & Schuster. ISBN 9781847376657.
- Windham, Ryder; Wallace, Daniel (2006). Star Wars: The Comics Companion. United States: Dark Horse Books Books. ISBN 9781593073121.
- Windham, Ryder; Wallace, Daniel; Hidalgo, Pablo (2011). Star Wars Year by Year: A Visual Chronicle (Hardback ed.). London: DK. ISBN 9781405392303.
- Windham, Ryder; Wallace, Daniel; Hidalgo, Pablo; Baver, Kristin (2021). Star Wars Year by Year: A Visual History, New Edition (Hardback) (1st ed.). London: DK. ISBN 9780241469408.

=== Magazines ===
- Gillatt, Gary, ed. (2002). "Slayer Special". Starbust Special #53. United Kingdom: Visual Imagination.
- Chernoff, Scott (1999). Snyder, Jon Bradley (ed.). "Anthony Daniels: Nuts and Bolts". Star Wars Insider 46. The Fan Club, Inc.
- Mendonca, Dave (2009). Wilkins, Jonathan (ed.). "The Man in the Golden Mask". Star Wars Insider 83. London: Titan Magazines.
- Newbold, Mark (2025). "A Musicial Journey". Star Wars Insider 230. Titan Magazines.
- Pirani, Adam (1984). McDonnell, David (ed.). "David Tomblin: A.D. to Indy Jones". Starlog #86. United States: Starlog Group, Inc.
- Richau, Amy (2026). Cooper, Christopher (ed.). "When Bricks Collide". Star Wars Insider 236. London: Titan Magazines.
- Robb, Brian J., ed. (2007). "You Said It, Chewie! A Star Wars Celebration In Their Own Words". Star Wars Insider 70. London: Titan Magazines.
- Waddell, Calum (2014). Wilkins, Jonathan (ed.). "Bad to the Bib". Star Wars Insider 147. Titan Magazines.
- Wilkins, Jonathan (2007). Robb, Brian J. (ed.). "The Empire Strikes Fact!". Star Wars Insider 70. London: Titan Magazines.
- Wilkins, Jonathan, ed. (2012). Star Wars Insider Special Edition 2013 (Paperback ed.). London: Titan Magazines. ISBN 9781848566965.
