= Star Wars: Where Science Meets Imagination =

Traveling exhibition

Exhibition logo

Star Wars: Where Science Meets Imagination was a traveling exhibition created by the Museum of Science, Boston, featuring props and costumes used in the Star Wars films, and focusing primarily on the science behind George Lucas' science fiction epic. The exhibition was developed by Boston's Museum of Science in collaboration with Lucasfilm Ltd., with the support of the National Science Foundation, under Grant No. 0307875. The exhibit was presented nationally by Bose Corporation.

The exhibit premiered in Boston in 2005, and drew nearly 3 million visitors across the United States and Australia and before making its final appearance in San Jose, California. A companion book was released in 2005.

== History ==
The exhibit was developed over a period of four years, beginning in 2002. It opened to the public at the Museum of Science on October 27, 2005. George Lucas was the guest of honor at the museum's Grand Opening Gala; Anthony Daniels, the actor who plays C-3PO, was the master of ceremonies.

The exhibit left Boston on April 30, 2006, to commence its 20-venue international tour. The final venue of the tour was announced in the spring of 2013, and ended in March 2014 at The Tech Museum of Innovation in San Jose.

== Features ==
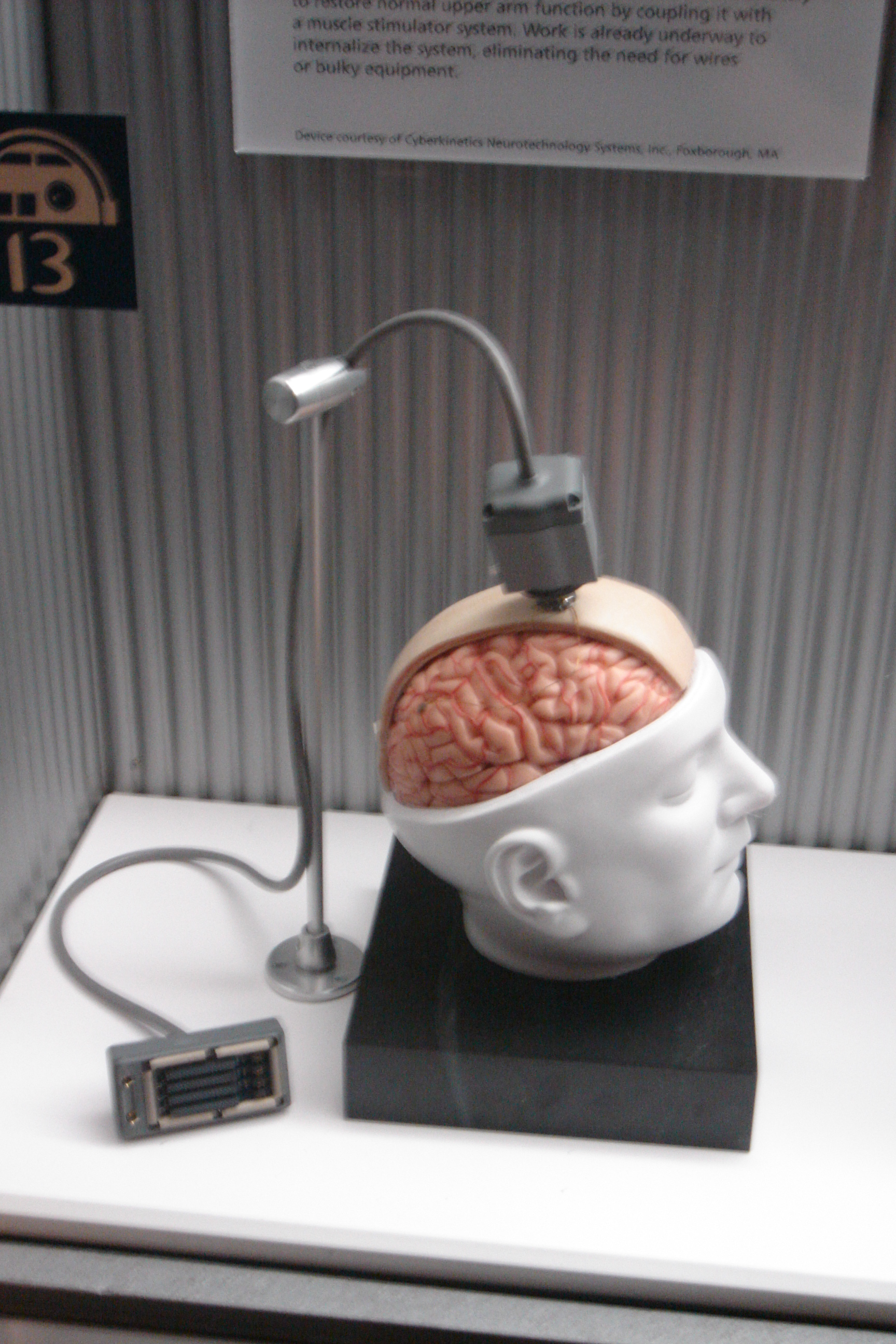
Model of a BrainGate interface at the Star Wars exhibition at the Boston Science Museum in December 2005

The primary focus of the exhibit was the presentation of modern science and technology through the lens of Star Wars. Topics ranging from space travel, prosthetics, robotics, and levitation technology as in hovercraft and maglev trains were addressed through hands-on activities and volunteer demonstrations.

=== Interactive displays ===
The exhibit included a reproduction of the Millennium Falcon's cockpit, which featured a four-and-a-half minute experience about real-world space exploration, particularly the unmanned exploration of the outer planets of the Solar System, and the hundreds of exoplanets that have been discovered. The experience was narrated by Anthony Daniels, and added effects in the cockpit (rumbling seats, fans, and lights) were meant to simulate traveling through space and looking out the windshield. This exhibit was not included in the version at the Powerhouse Museum.

The "Living on Tatooine" section of the exhibit featured three augmented reality kiosks in which visitors interacted with a virtual environment on a large screen. The environment included reflected imagery of the visitor and computer-generated elements from the Star Wars universe which were attached to the props in the video. Visitors moved physical props in order to complete tasks of increasing complexity to build communities in the environments. The kiosks were developed by ARToolworks, Inc. When the user interacted with the props, the user and props appeared in the video, but once placed, the video took over the whole screen, the props disappeared, and the interaction between the computer generated elements was altered by their relative positions.

Also included in the initial 14 venues of the 20-venue tour was the Robot Object Theater. This interactive presentation on robotics narrated by C-3PO showed mockups of specific-purpose robots (pipe inspection and welding) and contrasted these with the Star Wars robots, robot soccer and the Kismet (robot). Its purpose was to provide insight into 21st-century thinking on how to improve the usefulness of robotics and the nature of human–robot interaction.

=== Props and costumes ===
The exhibit included a large number of props, costumes and models, including of Yoda, C-3PO, R2-D2, and Darth Vader's helmet from Star Wars: Episode III – Revenge of the Sith, as well as the models of the X-wing, Millennium Falcon and many others used in the films. There were also costumes for Mace Windu, Princess Leia, Anakin Skywalker, Obi-Wan Kenobi and the stormtroopers, and lightsabers belonging to Luke, Obi-Wan, Darth Maul and Count Dooku. On January 16, the Boba Fett costume was added to replace the Chewbacca costume.

=== Other features ===
There was a multimedia tour which used a PDA to provide additional audio, video, and image content. The PDAs had a bookmark feature, that allowed visitors to email special features of the exhibit to their email address. The exhibition also included a number of documentary films about the technology of Star Wars and its comparison to real-world technology.

=== Awards ===
One of the interactive computer exhibits, Human or Machine?, developed by interactive media developer Paula Sincero in collaboration with the Boston Museum of Science, was given an honorable mention in the 2006 Media & Technology MUSE Awards in the science category by the American Alliance of Museums (AAM). "MUSE awards recognize outstanding achievement in Galleries, Libraries, Archives, and Museums (GLAM) media. The Media & Technology Professional Network's annual awards are presented to institutions that enhance the GLAM experience and engage audiences with useful and innovative digital programs and services. The MUSE awards celebrate scholarship, community, innovation, creativity, education, accessibility, and inclusiveness ... Winning projects for each category are chosen by an international group of GLAM technology professionals."

The multi-person, role-playing exhibit encouraged interaction among museum visitors around ethics and decision-making at the intersection of science and society. Humor, surprise, animations, and questions prompted reflection and discussion about the possible consequences of human augmentation as visitors were invited to simulate augmenting themselves and see how various scenarios played out.

== Book ==
A companion book of the same name, produced by LucasBooks and edited by the Boston Museum of Science, was published by National Geographic in October 2005. The book's introduction is by Anthony Daniels. The book mainly discusses the same themes and concepts as covered by the traveling exhibition. A second edition of the book was released in September 2006.

== Tour schedule ==
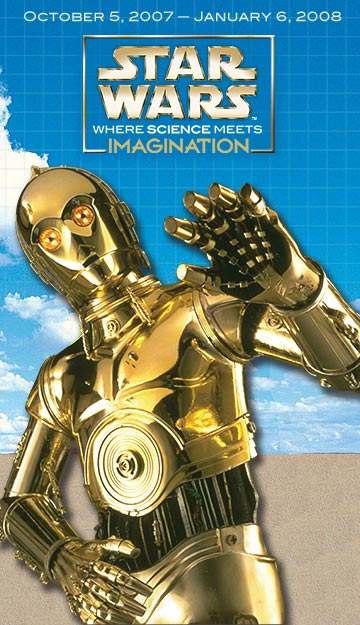
Tour poster

- Museum of Science, Boston, Massachusetts – October 19, 2005 – April 30, 2006
- COSI, Columbus, Ohio – June 3 – September 4, 2006
- Oregon Museum of Science and Industry, Portland, Oregon – October 11, 2006 – January 1, 2007
- California Science Center, Los Angeles, California – February 11 – April 29, 2007
- Fort Worth Museum of Science and History, Fort Worth, Texas – June 9 – September 3, 2007
- Museum of Science and Industry (MSI), Chicago, Illinois – October 5, 2007 – January 6, 2008
- Franklin Institute, Philadelphia, Pennsylvania – February – May 4, 2008
- Science Museum of Minnesota, Saint Paul, Minnesota – June 13 – August 24, 2008
- Powerhouse Museum, Sydney, Australia – December 4, 2008 – April 26, 2009
- Scienceworks, Melbourne, Australia – June 4 – November 3, 2009
- Anchorage Museum, Anchorage, Alaska February 9 – April 25, 2010
- U.S. Space & Rocket Center, Huntsville, Alabama – June 25 – September 6, 2010
- Lafayette Science Museum, Lafayette, Louisiana – October 21, 2010 – January 17, 2011
- Pacific Science Center, Seattle, Washington – March 19 – May 9, 2011
- The Health Museum, Houston, Texas – June 18 – September 18, 2011
- Discovery Science Center, Santa Ana, California – November 18, 2011 – April 15, 2012
- Exploration Place, Wichita, Kansas – May 26 – September 3, 2012
- Orlando Science Center, Orlando, Florida – October 13, 2012 – April 7, 2013
- Indiana State Museum, Indianapolis, Indiana – May 25 – September 2, 2013
- The Tech Museum of Innovation, San Jose, California – October 19, 2013 – March 23, 2014

== See also ==
- Science of Star Wars (miniseries)
