= Monopoly: Star Wars Heroes vs. Villains =

- Developer: Behaviour Interactive
- Publisher: Ubisoft
- Series: Monopoly, Star Wars
- Engine: Unity 6
- Platforms: Nintendo Switch 2; PlayStation 5; Windows; Xbox Series X/S
- Release: June 30, 2026
- Genres: Board game, strategy
- Mode: multiplayer

Monopoly: Star Wars Heroes vs. Villains is a 2026 video game published by Ubisoft and developed by Behaviour Interactive. The game features Monopoly matches within the Star Wars universe. It was released on June 30, 2026, on the PlayStation 5, Xbox Series X/S, Windows, and Nintendo Switch 2.

== Production ==
The game was initially announced on March 17, with a full reveal confirmed for April 29. It was initial scheduled to be released on June 11, but the release date was later delayed to June 30.

== Gameplay ==
Monopoly: Star Wars Heroes vs. Villains features two versus two or three versus three Monopoly matches, with the option of AI players being available if openings are not taken by other players. The game features various Star Wars characters with different abilities, including Luke Skywalker, who can send Wedge Antilles ahead of him to buy properties and collect money, and Dedra Meero, who can purchase properties for half-price. The game includes a total of twenty-eight characters and twenty-two locations, with local co-operative and online multiplayer modes being available.

== Voice Cast ==
- Anthony Daniels as C-3PO
- A. J. LoCascio as Han Solo
- Shelby Young as Princess Leia
- Ashley Eckstein as Ahsoka Tano
- Sam Witwer as Emperor Palpatine and Darth Maul
- Fred Tatasciore as Darth Vader
- Helen Sadler as Rey
- Stephen Stanton as Ben Kenobi
- Matthew Wood as General Grievous
- Corey Burton as Count Dooku and Cad Bane
- Dee Bradley Baker as Clone Troopers

== Reception ==
Reception

Aggregate score
Aggregator	Score
Metacritic	(PS5) 70/100

The PlayStation 5 version of Monopoly: Star Wars Heroes vs. Villains received "mixed or average" reviews from critics, according to the review aggregation website Metacritic. Checkpoint Gaming awarded it a score of 6.5 out of 10, saying, "This game is good for Star Wars fans, but not so much for Monopoly fans, due to the rule changes. Otherwise, just buy the regular board game."
