= Brian Muir (sculptor) =

British sculptor (born 1952)

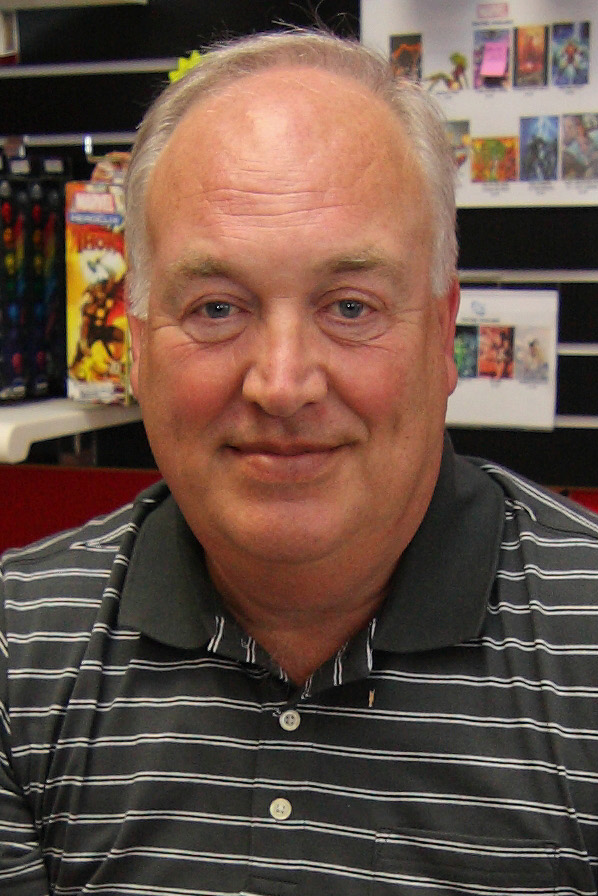
- Muir in 2010
- Born: 15 April 1952 (age 74); England
- Education: Fine art, sculpting
- Occupations: Sculptor, film
- Years active: 1967–2016
- Employer(s): Bradfords, Lucasfilm
- Known for: Star Wars, Harry Potter, Indiana Jones, Krull, James Bond, In The Shadow Of Vader, Darth Vader, ’Beyond the Shadow’ Darth Vader creator, Darth Vader sculptor, Stormtrooper creator, Stormtrooper sculptor
- Spouse: Lindsay Muir
- Website: http://www.brianmuirvadersculptor.com/

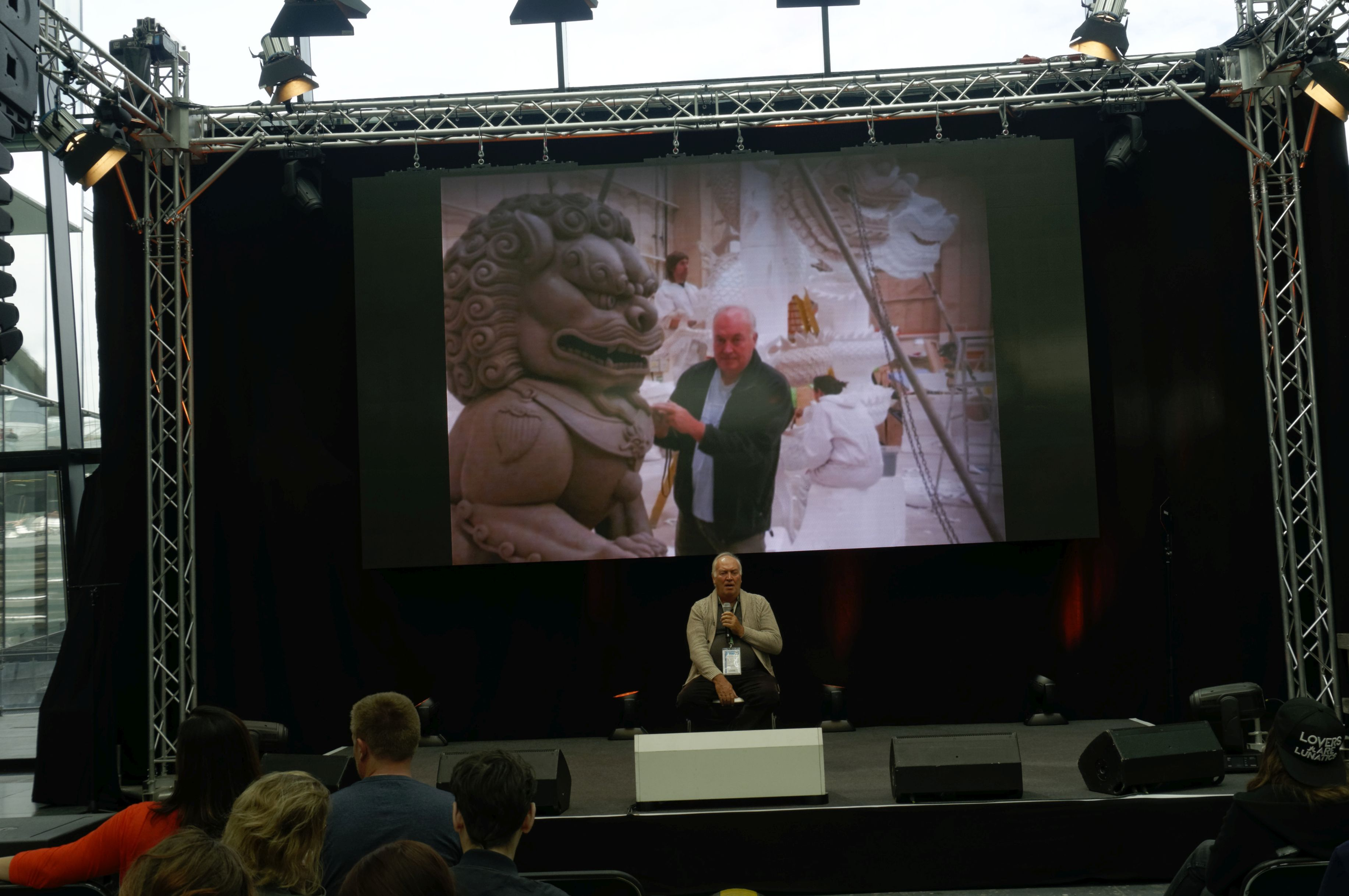
Muir at the Comic Con Germany in Stuttgart 2017

Brian Ian Muir (born 15 April 1952) is a British sculptor who most famously created Darth Vader's helmet and armour using Ralph McQuarrie's design.

He was also responsible for sculpting the stormtrooper armour in Star Wars (the helmet was sculpted by Liz Moore) and the heads for the Death Star Droid, CZ3, and some finishing work on the C-3PO full suit.

Apart from Star Wars, he worked on over 70 other movies, including Alien (for which he co-created the Space Jockey) and Raiders of the Lost Ark (for which he worked on the Ark of the Covenant prop).

== Autobiography ==
Brian Muir wrote an autobiography, In the Shadow of Vader, which was released on 19 December 2009 (ISBN 1907188193). The book covers experiences encountered whilst working within the Film Industry. It is currently available through his eshop on brianmuirvadersculptor.com. Following the success of his first book, In the Shadow of Vader, Brian decided to bring his incredible life story up to date by publishing his second book Beyond the Shadow. It chronicles the latter years of his impressive 48 year career as a film sculptor.

In July 2020 Brian, along with his wife Lindsay, has written and published their third and final book, Stormtroopers, The true story. A factual account of how the iconic Stormtroopers were created, which subsequently led to a high profile multimillion pound court case. With the endless controversy and conflicting stories reported in the media and on the internet, this book reveals the facts from the crew on the production in 1976.

== Filmography ==
- Alien
- Alexander
- A View to a Kill
- The Avengers
- Captain America: The First Avenger
- Captain Nemo and the Underwater City
- Clash of the Titans
- Crossed Swords
- The Curse of King Tut's Tomb
- Cutthroat Island
- The Dark Crystal
- Dark Shadows
- Die Another Day
- Dragonslayer
- The Eagle Has Landed
- The End of the Affair
- Erik the Viking
- Excalibur
- For Your Eyes Only
- Gangster No. 1
- GoldenEye
- Guardians of the Galaxy
- Hanover Street
- Harry Potter and the Deathly Hallows
- Harry Potter and the Half Blood Prince
- Harry Potter and the Order of the Phoenix
- Harry Potter and the Prisoner of Azkaban
- Indiana Jones and the Last Crusade
- Indiana Jones and the Temple of Doom
- John Carter
- Krull
- Lara Croft: Tomb Raider
- Lara Croft Tomb Raider: The Cradle of Life
- Link
- Little Shop of Horrors
- Loch Ness
- Lost in Space
- The Magical Legend of the Leprechauns
- The Martian Chronicles
- Mission: Impossible
- Mortal Kombat
- Nijinsky
- Octopussy
- Planet of the Apes
- Prince and the Pauper
- The Princess Bride
- Raiders of the Lost Ark
- The Railway Children
- Razor's Edge
- Return to Oz
- The Saint
- Sherlock Holmes II
- Silver Bears
- Sleepy Hollow
- Slipstream
- Snow White & the Huntsman
- Sphinx
- The Spy Who Loved Me
- Star Wars: Episode I – The Phantom Menace
- Star Wars Episode IV: A New Hope
- Superman
- Tomorrow Never Dies
- Up Pompeii
- Willow
- Young Sherlock Holmes
