= Star Wars: C-3PO =

Star Wars comic book

Star Wars Special: C-3PO
- Issue #1 cover (April 13, 2016)

Publication information
- Publisher: Marvel Comics
- Format: Limited series
- Genre: Science fiction
- Publication date: April 2016
- No. of issues: 1

Creative team
- Written by: James Robinson
- Artist: Tradd Moore (cover)
- Penciller: Tony Harris
- Letterer: Joe Caramagna
- Editor: Jordan White

Star Wars Special: C-3PO (subtitled The Phantom Limb) is a one-shot Star Wars comic book, set immediately before the events of the 2015 film Star Wars: The Force Awakens. It explains how protocol droid C-3PO obtained his red arm, which was prominently featured in the film. The book was written by James Robinson with art by Tony Harris and published by Marvel Comics on April 13, 2016. Robinson and Harris were the creative team previously responsible for the DC Comics title Starman between 1994 and 2001.

== Plot ==
Goodness! Han Solo! It is I, C-3PO. You probably don't recognize me because of the red arm.

— Star Wars: The Force Awakens (2015)

The story opens with the crash landing of a ship on an unknown planet. The only survivors are six droids, who emerge from the wreckage just as it explodes: C-3PO, VL-44, PZ-99 (a security droid), CO-34 (construction), 2-MED2 (medical), and Omri (First Order protocol). Omri is being held prisoner as it knows the location where Admiral Ackbar is being held captive. The comic book details the droids' journey to a homing beacon 87 kilometres (54 mi) distant, which they hope to activate to alert rescuers, despite having ordeals with the planet's impending hazards, including its droid-eating predators.

== Publication ==
In March 2015, Lucasfilm announced "Journey to Star Wars: The Force Awakens", a publishing initiative consisting of "at least" 20 novels and comic books from multiple publishers intended to connect the previous films with The Force Awakens and its forthcoming sequels. C-3PO #1 was announced in September 2015 and was intended to explain why the veteran protocol droid has a red arm. The comic was written by James Robinson with art by Tony Harris, and initially was to be published in December 2015. The one-shot was published by Marvel Comics on April 13, 2016.

== Reception ==
Reviewing for IGN, Jesse Schedeen wrote it "was a story worth telling" and praised Robinson's deft portrayal of C-3PO's relationships and memories.

== In other media ==
In an interview, J. J. Abrams, the director of the film, stated "Moments like Threepio's arm came from the desire to, well, mark time." It has been rumored that C-3PO's red arm is an Easter egg referring to the character of Venom Snake in Metal Gear Solid V: The Phantom Pain, who has a red-colored prosthetic left arm. Abrams and Metal Gear Solid creator Hideo Kojima are known to be friends. It is not clear if the tribute is intentional.

The story told in the comic was later made into a playable level for the video game Lego Star Wars: The Force Awakens, available as a free download exclusively for PlayStation 3 and 4 users.
