= Star Wars: Tales from the Galaxy's Edge =

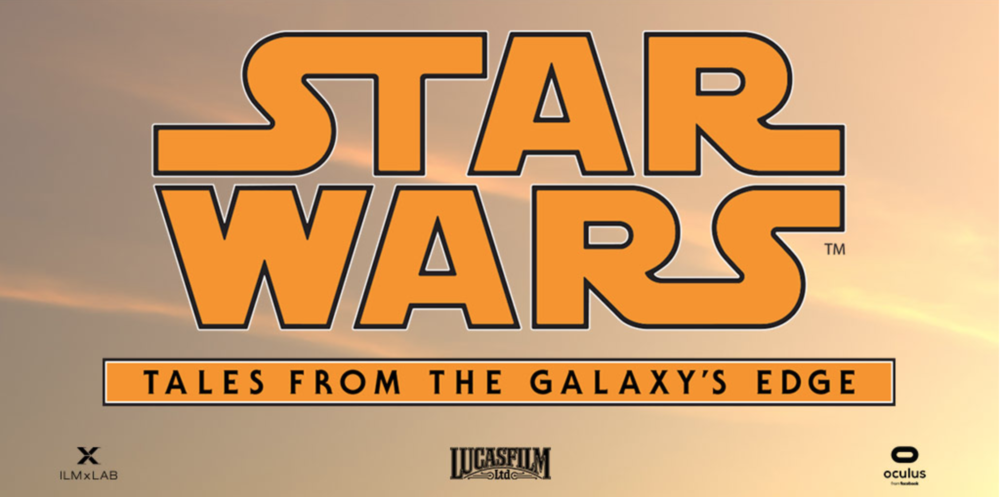
- Developer: ILMxLAB
- Publisher: Disney Electronic Content
- Director: Jose Perez III
- Writer: Ross Beeley
- Composers: Bear McCreary; Danny Piccone; Joseph Trapanese
- Platforms: Oculus Quest; Oculus Quest 2; Meta Quest Pro; Meta Quest 3; Meta Quest 3S; PlayStation VR2
- Release: Oculus Quest; November 19, 2020; Enhanced Edition; PlayStation VR2; February 22, 2023
- Genre: First-person shooter
- Mode: Single-player

Star Wars: Tales from the Galaxy's Edge is a virtual reality first-person shooter game originally released on November 19, 2020 for the Oculus Quest systems. The graphics were designed by ILMxLab.

The game is a virtual reality experience inspired by Star Wars: Galaxy's Edge (known in canon as the Black Spire spaceport or Black Spire Outpost on the planet Batuu) land at Disneyland Park and Disney's Hollywood Studios.

== Gameplay ==
The game involves first-person shooting.

== Plot ==
A droid mechanic crash lands on Batuu after encountering the Guavian Death Gang led by the intimidating Tara Rashin. In between blaster fire, the mechanic talks to bartender Seezelslak and find themselves in the middle of his stories that span different eras of the Star Wars timeline.

The next installment, subtitled Last Call, features treasure dealer Dok-Ondar (first mentioned in Solo: A Star Wars Story) who sends the mechanic on new adventures exploring the darkest parts of Black Spire Outpost.

== Reception ==
Reception

Review score
Publication	Score
Destructoid	6/10

Star Wars: Tales from the Galaxy's Edge received mostly positive reviews, with some critics disliking the game's short length. It has a score of 74 on OpenCritic.

On September 15, 2021, the downloadable content Last Call was released. Many reviewers said the release rounded out the initial game. AndroidCentral gave it a 4.5 star rating out of 5. Geeks of Color called it "the ultimate playground for Star Wars fans." TechRadar claimed that with the DLC release the title "has firmly cemented its place as one of the best Star Wars games out there."

=== Sales ===
Star Wars: Tales from the Galaxy's Edge: Last Call was the 4th most-downloaded PlayStation VR2 game in the United States and Canada, and the 6th in Europe in 2023. In 2024, it ranked 5th in the United States and Canada, and 6th in Europe. In 2025, Star Wars: Tales from the Galaxy's Edge: Last Call featured among the best-selling titles on the Meta Quest platform of all time.

=== Awards ===
Star Wars: Tales from the Galaxy's Edge: Last Call was nominated for VR Game of the Year by the VR Awards 2022.
