= Liz Moore (sculptor) =

British sculptor (1944–1976)

Elizabeth Moore
- Born: 15 September 1944
- Died: 13 August 1976 (aged 31)
- Known for: Film work

Elizabeth Moore (15 September 1944 – 13 August 1976) was a British sculptor, known for devising props for various classic films.

== Biography ==
Having trained at Kingston College of Art, Moore first came to public notice when making busts of The Beatles in 1966. The following year she sculpted the actress Sybil Thorndike and her actor husband Lewis Casson. The busts were subsequently donated to the Thorndike Theatre, Leatherhead on its opening in 1969, and now form part of the Garrick Club collection.

Moore's best-known film credits include 2001: A Space Odyssey (1968), for which she created the Starchild, Anne of the Thousand Days (1969), Cromwell (1970), A Clockwork Orange (1971), The Omen (1976) and Star Wars (1977), for which she sculpted C-3PO and the stormtrooper helmets. In 1976, Moore finalised C-3PO's character design and the art department modelled the costume on the actor, Anthony Daniels. (Note: Attributed to multiple references:) Daniels said that before his role in Star Wars, the only science fiction film he saw was 2001: A Space Odyssey. The process of making the costume and Daniels' fittings took six months.

On 13 August 1976, while working on A Bridge Too Far, Moore died in the Netherlands in a road accident, in a car driven by special effects designer John Richardson.

== Legacy ==
"This absolutely gorgeous young woman who was just a delight, worked with me holding the plastic cast. She created everything that you see [in the C-3PO on display]. And then she was killed in a car crash before we really began filming. So she never saw Threepio come to life. Yet it was she who created the face."

— —Anthony Daniels remembering Liz Moore in his interview, Conversation With C-3PO, Star Wars Insider 157, 2015 reprinted in The Best of Star Wars Insider Volume 7: Icons of the Galaxy

Her character design for C-3PO had a lasting impact on the franchise and film industry. The success of the first theatrically released Star Wars film led to further sequels rounding up the original trilogy, two more trilogies, several anthology films, television shows, commercials, radio series, concerts and a theme park ride which continued Anthony Daniels' association with the franchise for the next decades.

He mentioned Moore in an interview with Star Wars Insider in 2015 and his 2019 memoirs, I am C-3PO: The Inside Story. The book detailed Moore and the art department's combined efforts in designing the character and his costume fitting at Elstree as well as his experience portraying the character in the franchise from Star Wars to Star Wars: The Rise of Skywalker. He described Moore as "the loveliest and, as [he] would learn, most talented sculptor." He also said that she "had created something magical." While filming scenes for Star Wars in Tunisia, Daniels and the crew were told about Moore's death. Daniels said, "I will always remember Liz as a most beautiful and kind and creative soul."

Her character design for the Imperial stormtroopers has not only had a lasting impact on the franchise and film industry but the audience too. In 1997, Albin Johnson founded a fan organisation called the 501st Legion. This organisation is dedicated to the construction and wearing of screen-accurate costumes including Imperial stormtroopers.

== Notes ==
=== Print sources ===
- Daniels, Anthony (2019). I Am C-3PO: The Inside Story (Harback ed.). London: Dorling Kindersley. ISBN 9780241357606.
- Rinzler, J.W. (2007). The Making of Star Wars (Hardback ed.). Ebury Press. ISBN 9780091920142.
- Wilkins, Jonathan, ed. (2016). The Best of Star Wars Insider Volume 1 (Paperback ed.). London: Titan Books. ISBN 9781785851162.
- Wilkins, Jonathan, ed. (2018). The Best of Star Wars Insider Volume 7: Icons of the Galaxy (ebook ed.). Titan Books. ISBN 9781785856013.
- Wilkins, Jonathan, ed. (2017). Star Wars: A New Hope: The Official Celebration Special (Hardback ed.). London: Titan Magazines. ISBN 9781785864605.
- Wilkins, Jonathan, ed. (2021). Star Wars: The Skywalker Saga: The Official Collector's Edition (Hardback ed.). London: Titan Magazines. ISBN 9781787734661.
