= Science of Star Wars (miniseries) =

2005 TV documentary miniseries

Science of Star Wars is a 2005 television documentary miniseries aired by the Discovery Channel. The series features mainly archive footage from the actors of the original and prequel trilogies of the Star Wars saga.

The series explores and discusses various aspects of Star Wars from a scientific perspective. It compares many of the technologies in Star Wars and their similarities to modern technological progress and development. The series is divided into three episodes, one for the specific discussion of various related topics.

== See also ==
- Star Wars Tech
