= Star Wars comics =

Various comic books based on the Star Wars franchise

Star Wars
- Cover for Star Wars #1 (1977) by Howard Chaykin and Tom Palmer

Publication information
- Publisher: Marvel Comics (1977–1987, 2015–present); Dark Horse Comics (1991–2014, 2022–present); IDW Publishing (2017–2022)
- Schedule: Weekly
- Formats: Original material for the series has been published as a set of ongoing series, limited series, and one-shot comics.
- Genre: Science fiction
- Publication date: April 1977 – present
- Number of issues: Marvel (1st run): 138 issues Dark Horse Comics (1st run): 838 standard issues, 65 short issues and 35 graphic novels Marvel (2nd run): 290 issues IDW Publishing: 29 issues

Star Wars comics have been produced by various comic book publishers since the debut of the 1977 film Star Wars. (Note: Later titled Star Wars: Episode IV – A New Hope) Marvel Comics launched its original series in 1977, beginning with a six-issue comic adaptation of the film and running for 107 issues, including an adaptation of The Empire Strikes Back. Marvel also released an adaptation of Return of the Jedi and spin-offs based on Droids and Ewoks. A self-titled comic strip ran in American newspapers between 1979 and 1984. Blackthorne Publishing released a three-issue run of 3-D comics from 1987 to 1988.

Dark Horse Comics published the limited series Dark Empire in 1991, and ultimately produced over 100 Star Wars titles, including Tales of the Jedi (1993–1998), X-wing: Rogue Squadron (1995–1998), Republic (1998–2006), Tales (1999–2005), Empire (2002–2006), Knights of the Old Republic (2006–2010), and Legacy (2006–2010), as well as manga adaptations of the original film trilogy and the 1999 prequel The Phantom Menace.

The Walt Disney Company acquired Marvel in 2009 and Lucasfilm in 2012, and the Star Wars comics license returned to Marvel in 2015. Several new series were launched, including Star Wars, Star Wars: Darth Vader, and Doctor Aphra. In 2017, IDW Publishing launched the anthology series Star Wars Adventures. In 2022, Dark Horse resumed publishing new Star Wars comics and graphic novels.

== Overview ==
The original series by Marvel Comics began in 1977 with a six-issue comic adaptation of the original film and ran for 107 issues and three Annuals until 1986, featuring stories set between the original trilogy films, as well as adaptations of The Empire Strikes Back and Return of the Jedi. From 1985 to 1987, Marvel published two short-lived series based on the Star Wars animated series Droids and Ewoks. Briefly, the publishing rights went to Blackthorne Publishing, which released a three-issue run of 3-D comics from 1987 to 1988. Then, three years later, the rights to publish Star Wars comics were acquired by Dark Horse Comics, who published the limited series Dark Empire in 1991 and ultimately produced over 100 Star Wars titles until 2014.

Following the October 2012 acquisition of Lucasfilm by The Walt Disney Company, in January 2014, it was announced that the Star Wars comics license would return to Marvel Comics in 2015 (Disney having previously purchased Marvel Entertainment and the Marvel Comics brand and publishing in 2009). In April 2014, Lucasfilm rebranded the majority of the Star Wars Expanded Universe as Legends, only keeping the theatrical Skywalker saga and the 2008 Clone Wars theatrical film and television series as canon. Most media released since then is considered part of the same canon, including comics.

=== Marvel (1977–1987) ===
Marvel (1977–1987)
| Star Wars #1–107 | April 1977 – May 1986 |
| Star Wars Annual #1–3 | December 1979 – December 1983 |
| Marvel Illustrated Books Star Wars #1–2 | November 1981 – October 1982 |
| Star Wars: Return of the Jedi #1–4 | October 1983 – January 1984 |
| Star Wars: Ewoks #1–14 | May 1985 – July 1987 |
| Star Wars: Droids #1–8 | April 1986 – June 1987 |

Lucasfilm publicity supervisor Charles Lippincott approached Marvel Comics in 1975 about publishing a Star Wars comic book prior to the film's release. Lippincott initially had trouble getting a meeting with Stan Lee until joined by Roy Thomas, who wanted to edit the series. Since movie tie-in comics rarely sold well at that time, Lee negotiated a publishing arrangement which gave no royalties to Lucasfilm until sales exceeded 100,000. Thomas and artist Howard Chaykin adapted the events of the original film in issues #1–6 of Star Wars, with the first issue released for sale on April 12, 1977. (Note: Though the cover is dated July 1977, issue #1 was available for sale on April 12, 1977.) According to former Marvel editor-in-chief Jim Shooter, the strong sales of Star Wars comics saved Marvel financially in 1977 and 1978. The series began featuring original stories with issue #7 (January 1978). Writer Archie Goodwin and artist Carmine Infantino took over the series as of #11 (May 1978). The series was one of the industry's top selling titles in 1979 and 1980. The 100,000 copy sales quota was surpassed quickly, allowing Lippincott to renegotiate the royalty arrangements. A six-issue adaptation of The Empire Strikes Back by Goodwin and artists Al Williamson and Carlos Garzon appeared in issues #39–44 (September 1980 – February 1981). Writer David Michelinie and artist Walt Simonson became the new creative team with issue #51 (September 1981). Ron Frenz became the regular artist of the title starting with issue #71 (May 1983). As of 1984, the Star Wars series was primarily written by Jo Duffy, and art for the final year and a half of the series was by Cynthia Martin. Marvel published the series until 1986, lasting 107 issues and three Annuals.

The first original Star Wars stories not directly adapted from the films to appear in print form were Star Wars comics serialized in the Marvel magazine Pizzazz (1977–1979). The first story arc, titled "The Keeper's World", was by Thomas, Chaykin, and Tony DeZuniga. (Note: Reprinted by Dark Horse Comics in 1999) The second story arc, entitled "The Kingdom of Ice", was by Goodwin, Simonson, Klaus Janson, Dave Cockrum, and John Tartaglione. The final two chapters were scheduled to be printed in issues #17 and 18, but the magazine was cancelled after issue #16. Marvel UK reprinted "The Keeper's World" in its Star Wars Weekly #47–50, and "The Kingdom of Ice" (including the previously unreleased chapters) in its Star Wars Weekly #57–60 between 1978 and 1979. (Note: Both stories are featured in Star Wars Omnibus: Wild Space Volume 1 (2013), Star Wars: The Original Marvel Years Volume 3 (2015) and Epic Collection: Star Wars – The Original Marvel Years Vol. 1 (2016).)

Marvel's Star Wars comics were reprinted in the U.K. as a weekly black-and-white comics anthology. (Note: In addition to the Star Wars strips, this included other Marvel strips such as The Micronauts, Deathlok, Star-Lord, Warlock and Tales of the Watcher.) The weekly U.K. issues split the stories from the U.S. monthly issues into smaller installments, and it usually took two to three weekly issues to complete a U.S. monthly issue. The U.K. comic also published original Star Wars stories by British creators, including Alan Moore. (Note: The final page of Moore's story Dark Lord's Conscience was excluded in the original print because it was accidentally not delivered to the artist, John Stokes. Fourteen years later, Stokes created the last page for the comic's colorized reprint in Classic Star Wars: Devilworlds.) Star Wars Weekly #1 was published with a free cut-out X-wing fighter on February 8, 1978. It became The Empire Strikes Back Weekly from issue #118 in May 1980, and then became a monthly title from issue #140 in November 1980, reverting to the title Star Wars with issue #159 in July 1982. (Note: Issues #151, 153–157 and 159 were colorized in Classic Star Wars: Devilworlds.) The monthly comic ran until issue #171 in July 1983, when the numbering was reset at #1 for Return of the Jedi Weekly, which was the first time the U.K. comic had been printed in color. This is the title and format that remained until the last issue (#155) was published in June 1986. Further original content was published in issues #94–99, 104–115, 149 and 153–157. Throughout this eight-year period, Marvel UK also published several Star Wars Annuals and Specials.

Marvel's adaptation of Return of the Jedi (October 1983 – January 1984) appeared in a separate four-issue limited series as well as in Marvel Super Special #27 and in a mass market paperback. From 1985 to 1987, the animated children's series Ewoks and Droids inspired comic series from Marvel's Star Comics line.

=== Pendulum Press (1978) ===
In 1978, Pendulum Press, under their educational series Contemporary Motivators, also published a 31-page loose adaptation of Star Wars by Linda A. Cadrain and Charles Nicholas. Produced as part of a package which included an audio tape and a film strip, the comic was specifically designed for classroom use, with typeset instead of hand lettering, and vocabulary appropriate for children.

=== Newspaper strip (1979–1984) ===
A newspaper strip was published between 1979 and 1984, distributed by Los Angeles Times Syndicate and the Watertown Daily Times. The creative teams were revolving, but included Archie Goodwin, Williamson, Russ Manning, Steve Gerber, Alfredo Alcala, Carlos Garzon and letterer Ed King. Goodwin switched from writing Marvel's Star Wars series to the weekly newspaper comic strip after the release of The Empire Strikes Back (1980), becoming the first writer to draw from more than just the original film in establishing the era set between the two films. The strip was based on the storyline and characters established in the original trilogy, but never adapted any of the films, instead fleshing out the history between them. From October 1980 to February 1981, Goodwin and Alcala adapted Brian Daley's Han Solo at Stars' End (1979).

In 1991, Russ Cochran published a 2500-copy limited run of a three-volume hardcover boxset of all of Goodwin and Williamson's Star Wars comic strips from 1981 to 1984, signed by both creators, and featuring new cover illustrations by the latter. Dark Horse Comics collected colorized compilations of the newspaper strip in its Classic Star Wars series from 1992 to 1994. Between 2017 and 2018, The Library of American Comics published a three-volume reprint series of the complete comic strip.

=== Blackthorne (1987–1988) ===
Blackthorne Publishing released a three-issue series called Star Wars 3-D from December 1987 to February 1988. The comics were later reprinted in a black-and-white, non-3-D format by Dark Horse in their 2013 Star Wars Omnibus: Wild Space, Volume 1.

=== Dark Horse (1991–2014) ===
==== Adaptations ====
===== Film and television adaptations =====
Dark Horse
Film
| Star Wars: A New Hope — The Special Edition #1–4 | January–April 1997 |
| Star Wars Episode I: The Phantom Menace #1–4 | May 1999 |
| Star Wars Episode II: Attack of the Clones #1–4 | April–May 2002 |
| Star Wars Episode III: Revenge of the Sith #1–4 | March–April 2005 |
The Clone Wars Legacy
| Star Wars: Darth Maul – Son of Dathomir #1–4 | May–August 2014 |

Dark Horse also published miniseries adapting Episode I: The Phantom Menace, Episode II: Attack of the Clones, Episode III: Revenge of the Sith . From 1998 to 1999, Dark Horse produced Star Wars manga, adapting the original trilogy and The Phantom Menace as manga with all the typical narrative and stylistic characteristics of the form.

| Title | Material collected | Year | Pages | Format | ISBN |
|---|---|---|---|---|---|
| Darth Maul: Son of Dathomir (trade paper back) | Darth Maul: Son of Dathomir #1–4, material from Star Wars Tales #7–9 | November 2017 | 136 pages | Softcover | ISBN 1-30290-846-4 |

===== Legends novel adaptations =====
Dark Horse
Thrawn trilogy
| Star Wars: Heir to the Empire #1–6 | October 1995 – April 1996 |
| Star Wars: Dark Force Rising #1–6 | May–October 1997 |
| Star Wars: The Last Command #1–6 | November 1997 – July 1998 |
Other
| Star Wars: Splinter of the Mind's Eye #1–4 | December 1995 – June 1996 |
| Classic Star Wars: Han Solo at Stars' End #1–3 | March–May 1997 |

Between 1995 and 1998, Dark Horse published adaptations of the Thrawn trilogy of novels by Timothy Zahn.

==== Original series (Dark Horse comics) ====
Dark Horse subsequently launched dozens of series set after, in between, and before the original film trilogy, including Tales of the Jedi (1993–1998), X-wing: Rogue Squadron (1995–1998), Republic (1998–2006), the mostly non-canonical Tales (1999–2005), Empire (2002–2006), Knights of the Old Republic (2006–2010), and Legacy (2006–2010).

===== Dark Empire =====
Dark Horse
| Star Wars: Dark Empire #1–6 | December 1991 – October 1992 |
| Star Wars: Dark Empire II #1–6 | December 1994 – May 1995 |
| Star Wars: Empire's End #1–2 | October–November 1995 |

In the late 1980s, writer Tom Veitch and artist Cam Kennedy secured a deal to produce a Star Wars comic for Archie Goodwin at Epic Comics, a Marvel imprint. After the project was announced, Goodwin left Marvel, which dropped the comic. Dark Horse Comics subsequently published it as the Dark Empire sequence (1991–1995).

===== Classic Star Wars =====
Classic Star Wars is a series of comics which included compilations of weekly installments of the newspaper comics written by Archie Goodwin with art by Al Williamson.

Dark Horse
| Classic Star Wars #1–20 | August 1992 – June 1994 |
| Classic Star Wars: The Early Adventures #1–9 | August 1994 – April 1995 |
| Classic Star Wars: Devilworlds #1–2 | August–September 1996 |

===== X-wing =====
Dark Horse
| Star Wars: X-wing – Rogue Squadron #0–35 | July 1995 – October 1998 |
| Star Wars: X-wing – Rogue Leader #1–3 | September–November 2005 |

Star Wars: X-wing – Rogue Squadron is a comic book series of 35 issues released between 1995 and 1998. It follows the titular squadron beginning about one year after the events of Return of the Jedi.

X-wing – Rogue Leader is a three-part comic book series set approximately one week after the end of Return of the Jedi. Several participants in the destruction of the second Death Star are sent, a little while after the events of Bakura, to scout out Imperial activity in Corellian space.

===== Shadows of the Empire =====
Dark Horse
| Star Wars: Shadows of the Empire #1–6 | May–October 1996 |
| Star Wars: Shadows of the Empire – Evolution #1–5 | February–June 1998 |

===== Crimson Empire =====
Dark Horse
| Star Wars: Crimson Empire #1–6 | December 1997 – May 1998 |
| Star Wars: Crimson Empire II – Council of Blood #1–6 | November 1998 – April 1999 |
| Star Wars: Crimson Empire III – Empire Lost #1–6 | October 2011 – April 2012 |

The Crimson Empire trilogy follows Kir Kanos, one of Palpatine's Imperial guards, beginning about seven years after the events of Return of the Jedi. Set shortly after Dark Empire, it relates that Imperial Guard Carnor Jax betrayed the cloned Palpatine and his guards in an attempt to consolidate his own power. Kanos swears to stop him, coming close to New Republic Intelligence agent Mirith Sinn in the process.

Crimson Empire II introduces Nom Anor, who served as the model for the Yuuzhan Vong in The New Jedi Order, which he also appears in.

===== Qui-Gon & Obi-Wan =====
Dark Horse
| Star Wars: Qui-Gon & Obi-Wan – Last Stand on Ord Mantell #1–3 | December 2000 – March 2001 |
| Star Wars: Qui-Gon & Obi-Wan – The Aurorient Express #1–2 | February–June 2002 |

Qui-Gon & Obi-Wan: Last Stand on Ord Mantell is a three-part comics series written by Ryder Windham, published by Dark Horse Comics between December 2000 and March 2001. The story features Qui-Gon Jinn and Obi-Wan Kenobi five years before Episode I – The Phantom Menace.

Qui-Gon & Obi-Wan: The Aurorient Express is a two-part comics series written by Mike Kennedy, and published by Dark Horse Comics between February 2002 and June 2002. The series is set in the Star Wars galaxy six years before The Phantom Menace. A luxury cloud cruiser has slipped out of control and is going to crash over Yorn Skot. The two Jedi must board the runaway ship and regain control.

===== Knights of the Old Republic and The Old Republic =====
Dark Horse
| Star Wars: Knights of the Old Republic #0–50 | January 2006 – February 2010 |
| Star Wars: The Old Republic #1–11 | July 2010 – October 2011 |
| Star Wars: Knights of the Old Republic – War #1–5 | January–May 2012 |

Star Wars: Knights of the Old Republic and Star Wars: The Old Republic are series set around the events of the game series of the same name, exploring its backstory.

===== Legacy =====
Dark Horse
| Star Wars: Legacy #1–50 | June 2006 – August 2010 |
| Star Wars: Legacy – War #1–6 | December 2010 – May 2011 |
| Star Wars: Legacy Volume 2 #1–18 | March 2013 – August 2014 |

===== Star Wars: The Clone Wars =====
Dark Horse
| Star Wars: Clone Wars Adventures #1–10 (graphic novels) | July 2004 – December 2007 |
| Star Wars: The Clone Wars #1–12 | September 2008 – January 2010 |
| Star Wars: The Clone Wars #1–11 (graphic novels) | September 2008 – June 2013 |
| Star Wars: The Clone Wars – Act on Instinct #1–25 3-page | September 2009 – May 2010 |
| Star Wars: The Clone Wars – The Valsedian Operation #1–26 3-page | September 2010 – April 2011 |

===== Other original series (Dark Horse comics) =====
Dark Horse
| Star Wars: Tales of the Jedi #1–35 | October 1993 – November 1998 |
| Star Wars: Droids (1994) #1–6 | April 1994 – January 1995 |
| Star Wars: Droids (1995) #1–8 | April – December 1995 |
| Star Wars: Boba Fett #1–11 | December 1995 – April 2006 |
| Star Wars: Republic #0–83 | December 1998 – February 2006 |
| Star Wars Tales #1–24 | September 1999 – July 2005 |
| Star Wars: Empire #1–40 | September 2002 – March 2006 |
| Star Wars: Evasive Action – Reversal of Fortune #1–8 | October 2004 – June 2005 |
| Star Wars: Rookies – Rendezvous #1–3 | February–June 2006 |
| Star Wars: Rebellion #0–16 | March 2006 – August 2008 |
| Star Wars: Evasive Action – Prey #1–3 | March–November 2006 |
| Star Wars: Rookies – No Turning Back #1–4 | June–October 2006 |
| Star Wars: Dark Times #0–32 | November 2006 – December 2012 |
| Star Wars: Evasive Action – End Game #1–4 | November 2006 – March 2007 |
| Star Wars: Invasion #0–16 | April 2009 – November 2011 |
| Star Wars: Blood Ties #1–8 | August 2010 – July 2012 |
| Star Wars: Knight Errant #1–15 | October 2010 – October 2012 |
| Star Wars: Darth Vader #1–20 | January 2011 – April 2014 |
| Star Wars: Agent of the Empire #1–10 | December 2011 – February 2013 |
| Star Wars: Dawn of the Jedi #1–15 | February 2012 – March 2014 |
| Star Wars (2013) #1–20 | January 2013 – August 2014 |

- Star Wars: Agent of the Empire is a series set a few years before Episode IV – A New Hope, and focusing on an Imperial Intelligence agent named Jahan Cross. Trade paperbacks: Volume 1: Iron Eclipse (collects Star Wars: Agent of the Empire – Iron Eclipse #1–5, 128 pages, October 2012, ISBN 1-59582-950-4)
- Star Wars: Invasion is a series set during the early days of the Yuuzhan Vong War, and dealing with how the New Republic is faring. The series, published by Dark Horse Comics, was written by Tom Taylor, and illustrated by Colin Wilson with color by Wes Dzioba. The first printed issue was published on July 1, 2009. Published by Dark Horse Comics, the series was set in the New Jedi Order era and depict the events of the Yuuzhan Vong War over 16 issues, plus a prologue issue. In January 2010, Star Wars: Invasion #0 was nominated for a 'Diamond Gem Award' in the '2009 Comic Book of the Year Over $3.00' category.
- Star Wars: Dark Times, is a series set in the years after Episode III – Revenge of the Sith, and showing former characters from Star Wars: Republic after Order 66.
- Star Wars: Knight Errant, a series set 1,000 years before The Phantom Menace, and dealing with a lone Jedi's war against the Sith.
- Star Wars: Blood Ties, a series set in varying time periods that shows the bonds between certain characters in the saga, such as Jango Fett and Boba Fett.
- Star Wars: Darth Vader, a series set almost immediately after Revenge of the Sith, and showing how Darth Vader is dealing with his past as Anakin Skywalker.
- Star Wars: Dawn of the Jedi, a series set thousands of years before Episode I – The Phantom Menace, and showing the origins of the Jedi and the Sith.
- Star Wars is set shortly after A New Hope, focusing on the main characters of the original trilogy.

==== Limited series (Dark Horse comics) ====
After Knights of the Old Republic and Legacy ended in 2010, instead of publishing ongoing series, Dark Horse began publishing a "series of miniseries", including:

- Star Wars: Jedi, a series set a few decades before The Phantom Menace, and dealing with Qui-Gon Jinn in an undocumented area of his life.

Dark Horse (limited series)
| Star Wars: Jabba the Hutt #1–4 | April 1995 – February 1996 |
| Star Wars: River of Chaos #1–4 | June–October 1995 |
| Star Wars: Mara Jade – By the Emperor's Hand #0–6 | July 1998 – February 1999 |
| Star Wars: Jedi Academy – Leviathan #1–4 | October 1998 – January 1999 |
| Star Wars: Vader's Quest #1–4 | February–May 1999 |
| Star Wars Episode I: The Phantom Menace Adventures #1–5 | May 1999 |
| Star Wars: The Bounty Hunters #1–3 | August–October 1999 |
| Star Wars: Union #1–4 | November 1999 – February 2000 |
| Star Wars: Chewbacca #1–4 | January–April 2000 |
| Star Wars: Underworld – The Yavin Vassilika #1–5 | December 2000 – June 2001 |
| Star Wars: Jedi vs. Sith #1–6 | April–September 2001 |
| Star Wars: Starfighter – Crossbones #1–3 | January–March 2002 |
| Star Wars: Hasbro/Toys "R" Us #1–4 (10-page comics) | May 2002 |
| Star Wars: Jango Fett – Open Seasons #1–4 | May–September 2002 |
| Star Wars: Obsession #1–5 | November 2004 – May 2005 |
| Star Wars: General Grievous #1–4 | March–July 2005 |
| Star Wars: Evasive Action – Recruitment #1–6 | August–December 2005 |
| Star Wars: Purge #1–5 | December 2005 – January 2013 |
| Star Wars Adventures #1–6 (graphic novels) | October 2009 – August 2011 |
| Star Wars: Lost Tribe of the Sith #1–5 | August–December 2012 |
| Star Wars: Rebel Heist #1–4 | April–July 2014 |
Jedi
| Star Wars: Jedi Quest #1–4 | September–December 2001 |
| Star Wars: Jedi Council – Acts of War #1–4 | June–September 2000 |
| Star Wars: Jedi #1–5 | March 2003 – July 2004 |
| Star Wars: Jedi #1–5 | May–September 2011 |
Darth Maul
| Star Wars: Darth Maul #1–4 | September–December 2000 |
| Star Wars: Darth Maul – Death Sentence #1–4 | July–October 2012 |

==== One-shots (Dark Horse comics) ====
Routine Valor

Publication information
- Publishing company: Dark Horse Comics
- Subject: Star Wars
- Genre: Science fiction
- Format: One-shot
- Release date: May 6, 2006
- Country: United States
- Language: English
- No. of pages: 10

Expanded Universe
- Era: Rise of the Empire
- Galactic Year: 20 ABY

Creative team
- Script writer: Randy Stradley
- Cover artist: Sean McNally
- Artist: Doug Wheatley
- Colorist: Ronda Pattison
- Letterer: Michael David Thomas
- Designer: Keith Wood
- Editor: Randy Stradley
- Assistant editor: Dave Marshall
- Publisher: Mike Richardson

Dark Horse
| Classic Star Wars: The Vandelhelm Mission one-shot | March 1995 |
| Star Wars: Tales from Mos Eisley one-shot | March 1996 |
| Star Wars: This Crumb for Hire one-shot 10-page comic | August 1996 |
| Star Wars: The Protocol Offensive one-shot | September 1997 |
| Star Wars: Shadow Stalker one-shot | November 1997 |
| Star Wars: The Jabba Tape one-shot | December 1998 |
| Star Wars: Hard Currency one-shot 8-page comic | March 2000 |
| Star Wars: Aurra's Song one-shot 12-page comic | June 2000 |
| Star Wars: Heart of Fire one-shot 3-page comic | May 2001 – July 2002 |
| Star Wars: Poison Moon one-shot 6-page comic | February–May 2002 |
| Star Wars: Jango Fett one-shot TPB | March 2002 |
| Star Wars: Zam Wesell one-shot TPB | March 2002 |
| Star Wars: A Valentine Story one-shot | February 2003 |
| Star Wars: Brothers in Arms one-shot | May 2005 |
| Star Wars: Routine Valor one-shot 10-page comic | May 2006 |
| Star Wars: Clone Wars (PhotoComic) one-shot TPB | May 2008 |
| Star Wars: The Clone Wars – The Gauntlet of Death one-shot 8-page comic | May 2009 |
| Star Wars: Tales from the Clone Wars one-shot TPB | August 2010 |
| Star Wars: The Third Time Pays for All one-shot 8-page comic | April 2011 |
| Star Wars: The Art of the Bad Deal one-shot 10-page comic | May 2012 |
| Star Wars: The Assassination of Darth Vader one-shot 8-page comic | May 2013 |
| Star Wars: Ewoks – Shadows of Endor one-shot TPB | November 2013 |
The Force Unleashed
| Star Wars: The Force Unleashed one-shot TPB | August 2008 |
| Star Wars: The Force Unleashed II one-shot TPB | September 2010 |

Routine Valor is a comic book one-shot released on May 6, 2006, by Dark Horse Comics for Free Comic Book Day 2006 as part of a Star Wars-Conan flipbook. The story is set during the end of the Clone Wars, approximately one year before the events of Revenge of the Sith (and 20 years before the events of A New Hope). Characters include Obi-Wan Kenobi, along with Clone troopers Commander Cody, CT-8867, CT-8868, and CT-8869

External links:

- Routine Valor on Wookieepedia, a Star Wars wiki
- Dark Horse Listing

==== Alternate storylines ====
The Star Wars

Publication information
- Publisher: Dark Horse Comics
- Schedule: Monthly
- Format: Ongoing series
- Genre: Science fiction
- Publication date: 2013–2014
- No. of issues: 8

Creative team
- Written by: J.W. Rinzler
- Artist: Mike Mayhew
- Penciller: Mike Mayhew
- Colorist: Rain Beredo
- Editor: Randy Stradley

Dark Horse
| Star Wars Infinities #1–12 | May 2001 – March 2004 |
| Star Wars: Visionaries one-shot TPB | April 2005 |
| The Star Wars #0–8 | September 2013 – May 2014 |

While non-canonical to the Expanded Universe, Star Wars Infinities shows alternate storylines for the original trilogy films, and Visionaries featured stories by artists who worked on Revenge of the Sith.

The Star Wars is a 2013–2014 non-canonical comic series based on The Star Wars: Rough Draft, George Lucas's discarded 1974 draft for the original film. The series was written by J. W. Rinzler with art by Mike Mayhew. In this version, Luke Skywalker is more mature and a Jedi, and the main protagonist is named Annikin Starkiller. The series received mostly positive reviews.

=== Return to Marvel (2015–present) ===
Following the acquisition of Lucasfilm by The Walt Disney Company in 2012, it was announced in January 2014 that the Star Wars comics license would return to Marvel Comics in 2015. Disney had purchased Marvel's parent company, Marvel Entertainment, in 2009. Meanwhile, with the sequel film The Force Awakens in production, most of the licensed Star Wars novels and comics produced since the originating 1977 film Star Wars were rebranded as Star Wars Legends and declared non-canon to the franchise in April 2014.

Early reports in May 2014 suggested that Marvel would announce two new ongoing Star Wars comic series at San Diego Comic-Con. In July 2014, Marvel announced three new series at SDCC: Star Wars, Star Wars: Darth Vader, and the limited series Star Wars: Princess Leia.

==== Ongoing series ====
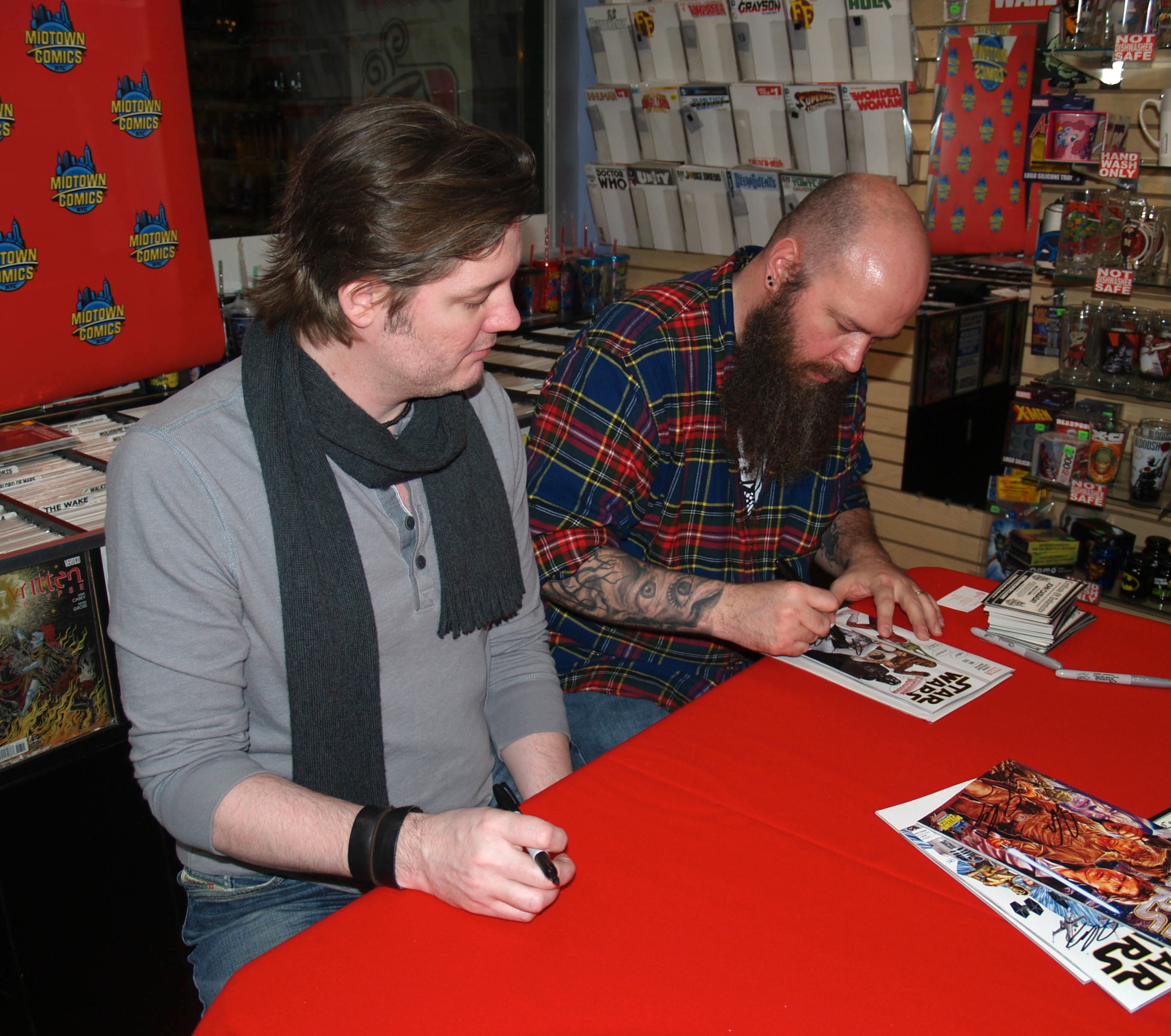
Artist John Cassaday (left) and writer Jason Aaron (right) at a January 2015 signing at Midtown Comics in Manhattan for Star Wars #1, the first Star Wars comic published by Marvel since 1987.

The initial series, Star Wars, was released in January 2015, with Darth Vader debuting in February.

The ongoing series Star Wars: Poe Dameron was announced in January 2016. Featuring X-wing fighter pilot Poe Dameron introduced in The Force Awakens, the series debuted on April 6, 2016. A six-issue comic adaptation of The Force Awakens by Chuck Wendig began publication in June 2016. In 2017. A second volume of the Marvel Darth Vader comic, subtitled Dark Lord of the Sith, began in June 2017 from writer Charles Soule and artist Giuseppe Camuncoli.

In August 2019, Marvel announced that the main Star Wars series that started in 2015, which has narratively caught up to the timeframe of the events of The Empire Strikes Back, would end in November 2019 with issue #75. A 56-page one-shot called Star Wars: Empire Ascendant, written by Soule, Greg Pak, Simon Spurrier, and Ethan Sacks, was released in December 2019 to wrap up the series.

At New York Comic Con in October 2019, Lucasfilm and Marvel announced the main Star Wars title would relaunch with a new ongoing series beginning in January 2020. Written by Soule, the flagship series will explore the time between The Empire Strikes Back and Return of the Jedi. It will expand on stories like how the demoralized ragtag band of rebels grows into the massive fleet that attacks the second Death Star, how the plan to rescue Han Solo from Jabba the Hutt is formed, how Leia balances her personal desires to save Han with her responsibilities to the Rebellion, Luke's growth as a Jedi while coming to an understanding of Darth Vader's reveal of his heritage, and the evolution of Lando Calrissian from selfish betrayer to trusted general.

First announced as Project Luminous at Star Wars Celebration in April 2019, full details of a publishing initiative called Star Wars: The High Republic were revealed in a press conference in February 2020. Involving the majority of the current officially licensed publishers, a new era set 200 years before the Skywalker Saga will be explored in various books and comics, including an ongoing Marvel title written by Cavan Scott.

The ongoing series Han Solo and Chewbacca was announced in December 2021. The series was described as being a collection of different adventures of the pair, starting just a few years before the events of Star Wars: A New Hope.

In January 2025, a relaunch of the main Star Wars continuity was announced, with a new #1 set for May of the same year. Written by Alex Segura, the new run explores the timeframe immediately after Return Of The Jedi.

Three more ongoings were announced in subsequent months: Legacy Of Vader, written by Charles Soule and set shortly after The Last Jedi; Mark Guggenheim's Star Wars: Jedi Knights, set in the lead up to The Phantom Menace; and Doctor Aphra: Chaos Agent, by Cherish Chen, set during the same period as Star Wars' ongoing 2025 series.

Marvel (2015–present)
Ongoing series
| Star Wars (2015) #1–75, four Annuals | January 2015 – November 2019 |
| Star Wars: Darth Vader #1–25, one Annual | February 2015 – October 2016 |
| Star Wars: Kanan #1–12 | April 2015 – March 2016 |
| Star Wars: Poe Dameron #1–31, two Annuals | April 2016 – September 2018 |
| Star Wars: Doctor Aphra #1–40, three Annuals | December 2016 – December 2019 |
| Star Wars: Darth Vader (vol. 2) #1–25, one Annual | June 2017 – December 2018 |
| Star Wars (1977) #108 | May 2019 |
| Star Wars (2020) #1–50 | January 2020 – September 2024 |
| Star Wars: Darth Vader (vol. 3) #1–50 | February 2020 – September 2024 |
| Star Wars: Doctor Aphra (vol. 2) #1–40 | May 2020 – January 2024 |
| Star Wars: Bounty Hunters #1–42 | May 2020 – January 2024 |
| Star Wars: The High Republic #1–15 | January 2021 – March 2022 |
| Star Wars: Han Solo and Chewbacca #1–10 | March 2022 – March 2023 |
| Star Wars: The High Republic (vol. 2) #1–10 | October 2022 – May 2023 |
| Star Wars: The High Republic (vol. 3) #1–10 | November 2023 – August 2024 |
| Legacy Of Vader (2025) #1– | February 2025 – |
| Star Wars: Jedi Knights (2025) #1– | March 2025 – |
| Star Wars (2025) #1– | May 2025 – |
| Doctor Aphra - Chaos Agent | June 2025 – |
Ongoing series related one-shots
| Star Wars: Vader Down #1 | November 2015 |
| Star Wars: Screaming Citadel #1 | May 2017 |
| Star Wars: Empire Ascendant #1 | December 2019 |
| Star Wars Saga #1 | December 2019 |
| Krrsantan: Star Wars Tales #1 | June 2022 |

===== Collected editions =====
====== Star Wars (2015) ======
These books are set between Star Wars Episode IV: A New Hope and Star Wars Episode V: The Empire Strikes Back.

| # | Subtitle | Issues collected | Format | Pages | Released | ISBN |
|---|---|---|---|---|---|---|
| 1 | Skywalker Strikes | Star Wars #1–6 | TPB | 160 | Oct 6, 2015 | 978-0785192138 |
| 2 | Showdown On Smuggler's Moon | Star Wars #7–12 | TPB | 144 | Jan 26, 2016 | 978-0785192145 |
| | Star Wars: Vader Down | Star Wars: Darth Vader #13-15; Star Wars #13–14; Star Wars: Vader Down | TPB | 152 | Apr 19, 2016 | 978-0785197898 |
| 3 | Rebel Jail | Star Wars #15–19, Annual #1 | TPB | 152 | Aug 16, 2016 | 978-0785199830 |
| 4 | Last Flight Of The Harbinger | Star Wars #20–25 | TPB | 144 | Jan 31, 2017 | 978-0785199847 |
| 5 | Yoda's Secret War | Star Wars #26–30; Annual #2 | TPB | 136 | Jul 18, 2017 | 978-1302902650 |
| | The Screaming Citadel | The Screaming Citadel; Star Wars (2015) #31-32; Doctor Aphra (2016) #7-8 | TPB | 136 | Oct 24, 2017 | 978-1302906788 |
| 6 | Out Among The Stars | Star Wars #33–37; Annual #3 | TPB | 144 | Dec 6, 2017 | 978-1302905538 |
| 7 | The Ashes Of Jedha | Star Wars #38–43 | TPB | 136 | Apr 4, 2018 | 978-1302910525 |
| 8 | Mutiny At Mon Cala | Star Wars #44–49 | TPB | 144 | Aug 7, 2018 | 978-1302910532 |
| 9 | Hope Dies | Star Wars #50–55; Annual #4 | TPB | 192 | Dec 24, 2018 | 978-1302910549 |
| 10 | The Escape | Star Wars #56–61 | TPB | 136 | Apr 10, 2019 | 978-1302914493 |
| 11 | The Scourging Of Shu-Torun | Star Wars #62–67 | TPB | 144 | Aug 21, 2019 | 978-1302914509 |
| 12 | Rebels And Rogues | Star Wars #68-72 | TPB | 120 | Nov 19, 2019 | 978-1302914516 |
| 13 | Rogues And Rebels | Star Wars #73-75; Star Wars: Empire Ascendant #1 | TPB | 120 | Mar 17, 2020 | 978-1302921682 |
| | Star Wars: From The Journals Of Obi-Wan Kenobi | Star Wars #7, 15, 20, 26–30; material from Star Wars #37 | TPB | 192 | Nov 10, 2020 | 978-1302925284 |
Modern Era Epics
| 1 | Skywalker Strikes | Star Wars (2015) #1-14, #1: Director's Cut; Star Wars: Vader Down #1; Darth Vader #13-15 | TPB | 488 | Jul 23, 2024 | 978-1302956707 |
| 2 | Yoda's Secret War | Star Wars (2015) #15-30, Annual #1-2 | TPB | 448 | Jul 22, 2025 | 978-1302964108 |
| 3 | The Screaming Citadel | Star Wars (2015) #31-43, Annual #3; Star Wars: The Screaming Citadel; Star Wars: Doctor Aphra #7-8 | TPB | 424 | Jul 21, 2026 | 978-1302968885 |
Hardcovers
| 1 | Star Wars Vol. 1 | Star Wars (2015) #1–12 | OHC | 296 | Sep 7, 2016 | John Cassaday cover: 978-1302900984 |
| 1 | Star Wars Vol. 1 | Star Wars (2015) #1–12 | OHC | 296 | Sep 7, 2016 | Stuart Immonen DM cover: 978-1302901981 |
| 2 | Star Wars Vol. 2 | Star Wars (2015) #15–25, Annual #1 | OHC | 288 | Jun 7, 2017 | David Aja cover: 978-1302903749 |
| 2 | Star Wars Vol. 2 | Star Wars (2015) #15–25, Annual #1 | OHC | 288 | Jun 7, 2017 | Terry Dodson DM cover: 978-1302907211 |
| 3 | Star Wars Vol. 3 | Star Wars (2015) #26–30, 33–37; Annual #2–3 | OHC | 256 | Jul 4, 2018 | Mike Mayhew cover: 978-1302909031 |
| 1 | Star Wars by Jason Aaron | Star Wars (2015) #1–37; Star Wars: Vader Down #1; Darth Vader (2015) #13–15; Star Wars: Doctor Aphra (2016) #7–8; Star Wars: The Screaming Citadel #1; Star Wars Annual #1–3 | Omnibus | 1,296 | Mar 12, 2019 | John Cassaday cover: 978-1302915377 |
| 1 | Star Wars by Jason Aaron | Star Wars (2015) #1–37; Star Wars: Vader Down #1; Darth Vader (2015) #13–15; Star Wars: Doctor Aphra (2016) #7–8; Star Wars: The Screaming Citadel #1; Star Wars Annual #1–3 | Omnibus | 1,296 | May 3, 2022 | John Cassaday cover: 978-1302934095 |
| 1 | Star Wars by Jason Aaron | Star Wars (2015) #1–37; Star Wars: Vader Down #1; Darth Vader (2015) #13–15; Star Wars: Doctor Aphra (2016) #7–8; Star Wars: The Screaming Citadel #1; Star Wars Annual #1–3 | Omnibus | 1,296 | May 3, 2022 | Stuart Immonen DM cover: 978-1302934293 |
| 1 | Star Wars by Jason Aaron | Star Wars (2015) #1–37; Star Wars: Vader Down #1; Darth Vader (2015) #13–15; Star Wars: Doctor Aphra (2016) #7–8; Star Wars: The Screaming Citadel #1; Star Wars Annual #1–3 | Omnibus | 1,296 | May 3, 2022 | Mark Brooks DM cover: 978-1302934101 |
| 2 | Star Wars by Gillen & Pak | Star Wars (2015) #38–75, Star Wars Annual (2016) #4, Star Wars: Empire Ascendant (2019) #1 | Omnibus | 1,000 | Apr 23, 2024 | Phil Noto cover: 978-1302955908 |
| 2 | Star Wars by Gillen & Pak | Star Wars (2015) #38–75, Star Wars Annual (2016) #4, Star Wars: Empire Ascendant (2019) #1 | Omnibus | 1,000 | Apr 23, 2024 | Pepe Larraz DM cover: 978-1302955915 |

====== Star Wars (2020) ======
These books are set between Star Wars Episode V: The Empire Strikes Back and Star Wars Episode VI: Return Of The Jedi.

| # | Subtitle | Issues collected | Format | Pages | Released | ISBN |
|---|---|---|---|---|---|---|
| 1 | The Destiny Path | Star Wars (2020) #1–6 | TPB | 136 | Nov 10, 2020 | 978-1302920784 |
| 2 | Operation Starlight | Star Wars (2020) #7-11 | TPB | 120 | Apr 6, 2021 | 978-1302920791 |
| 3 | War Of The Bounty Hunters | Star Wars (2020) #12-18 | TPB | 136 | Dec 28, 2021 | 978-1302920807 |
| 4 | Crimson Reign | Star Wars (2020) #19-25 | TPB | 160 | Sep 13, 2022 | 978-1302926182 |
| 5 | The Path To Victory | Star Wars (2020) #26-30 | TPB | 120 | May 23, 2023 | 978-1302932749 |
| 6 | Quests Of The Force | Star Wars (2020) #31-36 | TPB | 144 | Sep 26, 2023 | 978-1302948085 |
| 7 | Dark Droids | Star Wars (2020) #37-41 | TPB | 120 | Mar 5, 2024 | 978-1302948092 |
| 8 | The Sith And The Skywalker | Star Wars (2020) #42-47; Star Wars: Revelations (2023) (A story); material from FCBD 2024: Star Wars | TPB | 152 | Sep 3, 2024 | 978-1302954789 |
| 9 | The Path Of Light | Star Wars (2020) #48-50 | TPB | 112 | Dec 3, 2024 | 978-1302954796 |

====== Star Wars (2025) ======
These books are set after Star Wars Episode VI: Return Of The Jedi.

| # | Subtitle | Issues collected | Format | Pages | Released | ISBN |
|---|---|---|---|---|---|---|
| 1 | Out of the Darkness | Star Wars (2025) #1–10; material from FCBD 2025: Star Wars | TPB | 240 | May 5, 2026 | 978-1302960926 |

====== Darth Vader (2015) ======
These books are set between Star Wars Episode IV: A New Hope and Star Wars Episode V: The Empire Strikes Back.

| # | Subtitle | Issues collected | Format | Pages | Released | ISBN |
|---|---|---|---|---|---|---|
| 1 | Vader | Darth Vader #1–6 | TPB | 160 | Oct 6, 2015 | 978-0785192558 |
| 2 | Shadows And Secrets | Darth Vader #7–12 | TPB | 136 | Jan 6, 2016 | 978-0785192565 |
| | Star Wars: Vader Down | Star Wars: Darth Vader #13-15; Star Wars #13–14; Star Wars: Vader Down | TPB | 152 | Apr 19, 2016 | 978-0785197898 |
| 3 | The Shu-Torun War | Darth Vader #16–19, Annual #1 | TPB | 128 | Aug 9, 2016 | 978-0785199779 |
| 4 | End Of Games | Darth Vader #20–25 | TPB | 168 | Dec 6, 2016 | 978-0785199786 |
Modern Era Epics
| 1 | Shadows And Secrets | Darth Vader (2015) #1 Director's Cut; #2-12, Darth Vader Annual (2015) | TPB | 352 | Nov 26, 2024 | 978-1302960100 |
| 2 | Vader Down | Darth Vader (2015) #13-25, Vader Down; Star Wars (2015) #13-14 | TPB | 416 | Nov 25, 2025 | 978-1302966034 |
Hardcovers
| 1 | Darth Vader Vol. 1 | Darth Vader #1–12 | OHC | 296 | Jul 19, 2016 | 978-1302901950 |
| 2 | Darth Vader Vol. 2 | Darth Vader #13–25, Annual #1; Star Wars (2015) #13–14; Star Wars: Vader Down | OHC | 432 | Feb 28, 2017 | 978-1302902209 |
| | Star Wars: Darth Vader by Gillen & Larroca Omnibus | Darth Vader #1–25, Annual #1; Star Wars (2015) #13–14; Star Wars: Vader Down | Omnibus | 736 | Sep 19, 2017 | 978-1302908218 |

====== Darth Vader: Dark Lord Of The Sith ======
These books are set directly after Star Wars Episode III: Revenge Of The Sith.

| # | Subtitle | Issues collected | Format | Pages | Released | ISBN |
|---|---|---|---|---|---|---|
| 1 | Imperial Machine | Darth Vader: Dark Lord Of The Sith #1–6 | TPB | 144 | Dec 5, 2017 | 978-1302907440 |
| 2 | Legacy's End | Darth Vader: Dark Lord Of The Sith #7–12 | TPB | 136 | Apr 24, 2018 | 978-1302907457 |
| 3 | The Burning Seas | Darth Vader: Dark Lord Of The Sith #13–18, Annual #2 | TPB | 176 | Sep 11, 2018 | 978-1302910563 |
| 4 | Fortress Vader | Darth Vader: Dark Lord Of The Sith #19–25 | TPB | 168 | Feb 12, 2019 | 978-1302910570 |
Hardcovers
| 1 | Darth Vader: Dark Lord Of The Sith Vol. 1 | Darth Vader: Dark Lord Of The Sith #1–12 | OHC | 280 | Nov 6, 2018 | 978-1302913601 |
| 2 | Darth Vader: Dark Lord Of The Sith Vol. 2 | Darth Vader: Dark Lord Of The Sith #13-25, Annual #2 | OHC | 336 | Aug 25, 2020 | 978-1302925451 |
| | Star Wars: Darth Vader by Charles Soule Omnibus | Darth Vader: Dark Lord of the Sith #1-25, Annual #2 | Omnibus | 624 | Dec 7, 2021 | 978-1302931735 |

====== Darth Vader (2020) ======
These books are set between Star Wars Episode V: The Empire Strikes Back and Star Wars Episode VI: Return Of The Jedi.

| # | Subtitle | Issues collected | Format | Pages | Released | ISBN |
|---|---|---|---|---|---|---|
| 1 | Dark Heart Of The Sith | Darth Vader #1–5 | TPB | 136 | Nov 24, 2020 | 978-1302920814 |
| 2 | Into The Fire | Darth Vader #6-11 | TPB | 120 | Jun 22, 2021 | 978-1302920821 |
| 3 | War Of The Bounty Hunters | Darth Vader #12-17 | TPB | 112 | Dec 21, 2021 | 978-1302926229 |
| 4 | Crimson Reign | Darth Vader #18-22 | TPB | 120 | Oct 18, 2022 | 978-1302926236 |
| 5 | The Shadow's Shadow | Darth Vader #23-27 | TPB | 120 | Jan 10, 2023 | 978-1302932671 |
| 6 | Return Of The Handmaidens | Darth Vader #28-32 | TPB | 120 | Jun 27, 2023 | 978-1302948108 |
| 7 | Unbound Force | Darth Vader #33-36; Star Wars: Darth Vader (2015) #3 | TPB | 120 | Oct 10, 2023 | 978-1302948115 |
| 8 | Dark Droids | Darth Vader #37-41 | TPB | 112 | Apr 9, 2024 | 978-1302954758 |
| 9 | Rise Of The Schism Imperial | Darth Vader #42-47; material from FCBD 2024: Star Wars: Revelations (2023) (E story) | TPB | 152 | Sep 10, 2024 | 978-1302954765 |
| 10 | Phantoms | Darth Vader #48-50; The Phantom Menace 25th Anniversary Special | TPB | 136 | Dec 31, 2024 | 978-1302956189 |

====== Doctor Aphra (2016) ======
These books are set between Star Wars Episode IV: A New Hope and Star Wars Episode V: The Empire Strikes Back.

| # | Subtitle | Issues collected | Format | Writers | Artists | Pages | Released | ISBN |
Paperbacks
| 1 | Aphra | Star Wars: Doctor Aphra (2016) #1-6 | TPB | Kieron Gillen | Kev Walker | 152 | Jul 3, 2017 | Kamome Shirahama issue #1 cover: 978-1302906771 |
| | The Screaming Citadel | The Screaming Citadel; Star Wars (2015) #31-32; Doctor Aphra (2016) #7-8 | TPB | Kieron Gillen, Jason Aaron | Marco Checchetto, Salvador Larroca, Andrea Broccardo | 136 | Oct 24, 2017 | Marco Checchetto Screaming Citadel cover: 978-1302906788 |
| 2 | Doctor Aphra And The Enormous Profit | Star Wars: Doctor Aphra (2016) #9-13, Annual #1 | TPB | Kieron Gillen | Kev Walker, Marc Laming | 168 | Feb 20, 2018 | Kamome Shirahama issue #10 cover: 978-1302907631 |
| 3 | Remastered | Star Wars: Doctor Aphra (2016) #14-19 | TPB | Kieron Gillen, Simon Spurrier | Emilio Laiso | 136 | Jul 10, 2018 | Ashley Witter issue #19 cover: 978-1302911522 |
| 4 | The Catastrophe Con | Star Wars: Doctor Aphra (2016) #20-25 | TPB | Simon Spurrier | Kev Walker | 136 | Jan 8, 2019 | Ashley Witter issue #20 cover: 978-1302911539 |
| 5 | Worst Among Equals | Star Wars: Doctor Aphra (2016) #26-31, Annual #2 | TPB | Simon Spurrier | Emilio Laiso | 168 | Jun 25, 2019 | Ashley Witter issue #29 cover: 978-1302914875 |
| 6 | Unspeakable Rebel Superweapon | Star Wars: Doctor Aphra (2016) #32-36 | TPB | Simon Spurrier | Wilton Santos, Caspar Wijngaard, Andrea Broccardo | 120 | Dec 11, 2019 | Ashley Witter issue #36 cover: 978-1302914882 |
| 7 | A Rogue's End | Star Wars: Doctor Aphra (2016) #37-40, Annual #3; material from Star Wars: Empire Ascendant (2019) | TPB | Simon Spurrier | Caspar Wijngaard, Elsa Charretier | 128 | Feb 11, 2020 | Ashley Witter issue #37 cover: 978-1302919092 |
Hardcovers
| | Star Wars: Doctor Aphra | Doctor Aphra #1–8; Star Wars: The Screaming Citadel; Star Wars (2015) #31–32 | OHC | Kieron Gillen, Jason Aaron | Kev Walker, Marco Checchetto, Salvador Larroca, Andrea Broccardo | 272 | Sep 19, 2018 | Kamome Shirahama issue #3 cover: 978-1302913212 |
| 1 | Star Wars: Doctor Aphra Vol. 1 | Star Wars: Doctor Aphra (2016) #1–40, Annual #1–3; Darth Vader (2015) #3–4, 8, 21; Star Wars (2015) #13, 19, 31–32; Star Wars: The Screaming Citadel; material from Darth Vader (2015) #25 and Star Wars: Empire Ascendant | Omnibus | Kieron Gillen, Simon Spurrier | Kev Walker, Salvador Larroca, Andrea Broccardo, Emilio Laiso, Mark Laming, Will Sliney, Caspar Wijngaard, Wilton Santos | 1,240 | Feb 24, 2021 | Ashley Witter cover: 978-1302928438 |
| 1 | Star Wars: Doctor Aphra Vol. 1 | Star Wars: Doctor Aphra (2016) #1–40, Annual #1–3; Darth Vader (2015) #3–4, 8, 21; Star Wars (2015) #13, 19, 31–32; Star Wars: The Screaming Citadel; material from Darth Vader (2015) #25 and Star Wars: Empire Ascendant | Omnibus | Kieron Gillen, Simon Spurrier | Kev Walker, Salvador Larroca, Andrea Broccardo, Emilio Laiso, Mark Laming, Will Sliney, Caspar Wijngaard, Wilton Santos | 1,240 | Feb 24, 2021 | Rod Reis DM cover: 978-1302928445 |
| 1 | Star Wars: Doctor Aphra Vol. 1 | Star Wars: Doctor Aphra (2016) #1–40, Annual #1–3; Darth Vader (2015) #3–4, 8, 21; Star Wars (2015) #13, 19, 31–32; Star Wars: The Screaming Citadel; material from Darth Vader (2015) #25 and Star Wars: Empire Ascendant | Omnibus | Kieron Gillen, Simon Spurrier | Kev Walker, Salvador Larroca, Andrea Broccardo, Emilio Laiso, Mark Laming, Will Sliney, Caspar Wijngaard, Wilton Santos | 1,240 | Jan 31, 2023 | Ashley Witter cover: 978-1302947941 |
| 1 | Star Wars: Doctor Aphra Vol. 1 | Star Wars: Doctor Aphra (2016) #1–40, Annual #1–3; Darth Vader (2015) #3–4, 8, 21; Star Wars (2015) #13, 19, 31–32; Star Wars: The Screaming Citadel; material from Darth Vader (2015) #25 and Star Wars: Empire Ascendant | Omnibus | Kieron Gillen, Simon Spurrier | Kev Walker, Salvador Larroca, Andrea Broccardo, Emilio Laiso, Mark Laming, Will Sliney, Caspar Wijngaard, Wilton Santos | 1,240 | Jan 31, 2023 | Rod Reis DM cover: 978-1302947958 |

====== Doctor Aphra (2020) ======
These books are set between Star Wars Episode V: The Empire Strikes Back and Star Wars Episode VI: Return Of The Jedi.

| # | Subtitle | Issues collected | Format | Writers | Artists | Pages | Released | ISBN |
Paperbacks
| 1 | Fortune And Fate | Doctor Aphra (2020) #1-5 | TPB | Alyssa Wong | Marika Cresta | 168 | Jan 26, 2021 | Valentina Remenar issue #1 cover: 978-1302923044 |
| 2 | The Engine Job | Doctor Aphra (2020) #6-10 | TPB | Alyssa Wong | Ray-Anthony Height, Robert Gill | 112 | Aug 10, 2021 | Joshua Swaby issue #7 cover: 978-1302923051 |
| 3 | War Of The Bounty Hunters | Doctor Aphra (2020) #11-15 | TPB | Alyssa Wong | Minkyu Jung | 112 | Dec 14, 2021 | Sara Pichelli issue #12 cover: 978-1302928797 |
| 4 | Crimson Reign | Doctor Aphra (2020) #16-20 | TPB | Alyssa Wong | Minkyu Jung | 120 | Oct 25, 2022 | Sara Pichelli issue #17 cover: 978-1302933029 |
| 5 | The Spark Eternal | Doctor Aphra (2020) #21-25 | TPB | Alyssa Wong | Minkyu Jung | 120 | Dec 27, 2022 | W. Scott Forbes issue #22 cover: 978-0785194781 |
| 6 | Ascendant | Doctor Aphra (2020) #26-31 | TPB | Alyssa Wong | Minkyu Jung | 144 | Aug 1, 2023 | Rachael Stott issue #31 cover: 978-1302948030 |
| 7 | Dark Droids | Doctor Aphra (2020) #32-40; Star Wars: Revelations (B story) | TPB | Alyssa Wong | Derrick Chew | 200 | Apr 23, 2024 | Derrick Chew issue #36 cover: 978-1302948047 |
Omnibuses
| 2 | Star Wars: Doctor Aphra Vol. 2 | Star Wars: Doctor Aphra (2020) #1–25 | Omnibus | Alyssa Wong | Marika Cresta, Ray-Anthony Height, Minkyu Jung | 560 | Aug 29, 2023 | Valentina Remenar cover: 978-1302949990 |
| 2 | Star Wars: Doctor Aphra Vol. 2 | Star Wars: Doctor Aphra (2020) #1–25 | Omnibus | Alyssa Wong | Marika Cresta, Ray-Anthony Height, Minkyu Jung | 560 | Aug 29, 2023 | Joshua Swaby DM cover: 978-1302950002 |
| 3 | Star Wars: Doctor Aphra: Friends & Enemies | Star Wars: Doctor Aphra (2020) #26–40; Star Wars Revelations (Aphra story); Star Wars: Sana Starros #1-5 | Omnibus | Alyssa Wong, Justina Ireland | Minkyu Jung, Pere Pérez | 472 | Dec 2, 2025 | Jung-Geun Yoon cover: 978-1302961305 |
| 3 | Star Wars: Doctor Aphra: Friends & Enemies | Star Wars: Doctor Aphra (2020) #26–40; Star Wars Revelations (Aphra story); Star Wars: Sana Starros #1-5 | Omnibus | Alyssa Wong, Justina Ireland | Minkyu Jung, Pere Pérez | 472 | Dec 2, 2025 | Betsy Cola DM cover: 978-1302961312 |

====== Doctor Aphra (2025) ======
These books are set after Star Wars Episode VI: Return Of The Jedi.

| # | Subtitle | Issues collected | Format | Writers | Artists | Pages | Released | ISBN |
Paperbacks
| 1 | Chaos Agent | Doctor Aphra (2025) #1-10 | TPB | Cherish Chen | Gabriel Guzman, Steven Cummings | TBC | May 19, 2026 | E.J. Su issue #1 cover: 978-1302963224 |

====== Kanan ======
| # | Subtitle | Issues collected | Format | Pages | Released | ISBN |
|---|---|---|---|---|---|---|
| 1 | The Last Padawan | Kanan - The Last Padawan #1–6 | TPB | 144 | Nov 3, 2015 | 978-0785193661 |
| 2 | First Blood | Kanan #7–12 | TPB | 144 | May 31, 2016 | 978-0785196037 |
Hardcover
| | Star Wars: Kanan Omnibus | Kanan - The Last Padawan #1-5; Kanan #6-12 | Omnibus | 272 | Dec 20, 2016 | 978-1302902223 |
Modern Era Epic
| | The Last Padawan | Kanan: The Last Padawan #1-5; Kanan #6-12 | TPB | 272 | Aug 26, 2025 | 978-1302959470 |

====== Poe Dameron ======
These books are set directly before Star Wars Episode VII: The Force Awakens.

| # | Subtitle | Issues collected | Format | Pages | Released | ISBN |
|---|---|---|---|---|---|---|
| 1 | Black Squadron | Poe Dameron #1–6 | TPB | 144 | Dec 13, 2016 | 978-1302901103 |
| 2 | The Gathering Storm | Poe Dameron #8–13 | TPB | 144 | Jul 3, 2017 | 978-1302901110 |
| 3 | Legend Lost | Poe Dameron #7, 14–19 | TPB | 160 | Nov 15, 2017 | 978-1302907426 |
| 4 | Legend Found | Poe Dameron #20–25, Annual #1 | TPB | 168 | May 15, 2018 | 978-1302907433 |
| 5 | The Spark And The Fire | Poe Dameron #26–31, Annual #2 | TPB | 136 | Dec 4, 2018 | 978-1302911706 |
| | Star Wars: Poe Dameron | Star Wars: Poe Dameron #1-31; Annual #1-2 | Omnibus | 792 | Sep 8, 2026 | Phil Noto cover: 978-1302955878 |
| | Star Wars: Poe Dameron | Star Wars: Poe Dameron #1-31; Annual #1-2 | Omnibus | 792 | Sep 8, 2026 | Rod Reis DM cover: 978-1302955885 |

====== Star Wars: Bounty Hunters ======
These books are set between Star Wars Episode V: The Empire Strikes Back and Star Wars Episode VI: Return Of The Jedi.

| # | Subtitle | Issues collected | Format | Pages | Released | ISBN |
|---|---|---|---|---|---|---|
| 1 | Galaxy's Deadliest | Star Wars: Bounty Hunters #1-5 | TPB | 136 | Nov 24, 2020 | 978-1302920838 |
| 2 | Target Valance | Star Wars: Bounty Hunters #6-11 | TPB | 136 | Jun 8, 2021 | 978-1302920845 |
| 3 | War Of The Bounty Hunters | Star Wars: Bounty Hunters #12-17 | TPB | 136 | Jan 11, 2022 | 978-1302928810 |
| 4 | Crimson Reign | Star Wars: Bounty Hunters #18-22 | TPB | 112 | Oct 25, 2022 | 978-1302933012 |
| 5 | The Raid On The Vermillion | Star Wars: Bounty Hunters #23-28 | TPB | 144 | Feb 14, 2023 | 978-0785194798 |
| 6 | Bedlam On Bestine | Star Wars: Bounty Hunters #29-34 | TPB | 144 | Sep 19, 2023 | 978-1302948016 |
| 7 | Dark Droids | Star Wars: Bounty Hunters #35-42 | TPB | 192 | Apr 16, 2024 | 978-1302948023 |

====== Star Wars: Jedi Knights ======
These books are set immediately before Star Wars Episode I: The Phantom Menace.

| # | Subtitle | Issues collected | Format | Pages | Released | ISBN |
|---|---|---|---|---|---|---|
| 1 | Guardians Of The Republic | Star Wars: Jedi Knights #1-5 | TPB | 120 | Nov 4, 2025 | 978-1302963200 |
| 2 | A Higher Path | Star Wars: Jedi Knights #6-10 | TPB | 112 | Apr 7, 2026 | 978-1302963217 |

====== Star Wars: Legacy Of Vader ======
These books are set between Star Wars: Episode VIII The Last Jedi and Star Wars: Episode IX The Rise of Skywalker.

| # | Subtitle | Issues collected | Format | Pages | Released | ISBN |
|---|---|---|---|---|---|---|
| 1 | The Reign Of Kylo Ren | Star Wars: The Legacy Of Vader #1-6 | TPB | 144 | Oct 7, 2025 | 978-1302960940 |
| 2 | The Reign Of Kylo Ren Vol. 2 | Star Wars: The Legacy Of Vader #7-12 | TPB | 136 | Mar 31, 2026 | 978-1302960957 |

====== Events ======
| # | Subtitle | Issues collected | Format | Pages | Released | ISBN |
|---|---|---|---|---|---|---|
| | Star Wars: Vader Down | Star Wars: Darth Vader #13-15; Star Wars #13–14; Star Wars: Vader Down | TPB | 152 | Apr 19, 2016 | 978-0785197898 |
| | The Screaming Citadel | The Screaming Citadel; Star Wars (2015) #31-32; Doctor Aphra (2016) #7-8 | TPB | 136 | Oct 24, 2017 | 978-1302906788 |
War Of The Bounty Hunters (2021)
| 1 | Star Wars: War Of The Bounty Hunters | Star Wars: War Of The Bounty Hunters Alpha #1; Star Wars: War Of The Bounty Hunters #1-5 | TPB | 156 | Nov 23, 2021 | 978-1302928803 |
| 2 | Star Wars: War Of The Bounty Hunters Companion | Star Wars: War Of The Bounty Hunters - Jabba The Hutt; Star Wars: War Of The Bounty Hunters - 4-Lom & Zuckuss; Star Wars: War Of The Bounty Hunters - Boushh; Star Wars: War Of The Bounty Hunters - IG-88 | TPB | 136 | Dec 7, 2021 | 978-1302931490 |
| | Star Wars: War Of The Bounty Hunters Omnibus | Star Wars: War Of The Bounty Hunters Alpha; Star Wars: War Of The Bounty Hunters #1–5; Star Wars: War Of The Bounty Hunters – Jabba The Hutt, 4-LOM & Zuckess, Boushh and IG-88; Star Wars (2020) #13–18; Star Wars: Bounty Hunters #12–17; Star Wars: Darth Vader (2020) #12–17; Star Wars: Doctor Aphra (2020) #10–15 | Omnibus | 848 | Dec 13, 2022 | Steve McNiven cover: 978-1302947835 |
| | Star Wars: War Of The Bounty Hunters Omnibus | Star Wars: War Of The Bounty Hunters Alpha; Star Wars: War Of The Bounty Hunters #1–5; Star Wars: War Of The Bounty Hunters – Jabba The Hutt, 4-LOM & Zuckess, Boushh and IG-88; Star Wars (2020) #13–18; Star Wars: Bounty Hunters #12–17; Star Wars: Darth Vader (2020) #12–17; Star Wars: Doctor Aphra (2020) #10–15 | Omnibus | 848 | Dec 13, 2022 | Leinil Francis Yu DM cover: 978-1302947835 |
Crimson Reign (2021-22)
| | Crimson Reign | Star Wars: Crimson Reign #1-5 | TPB | 136 | Aug 23, 2022 | 978-0785194682 |
| | Star Wars: Crimson Reign Omnibus | Star Wars: Crimson Reign (2021) #1–5, Star Wars (2020) #19–25, Star Wars: Bounty Hunters (2020) #18–24, Star Wars: Darth Vader (2020) #18–24, Star Wars: Doctor Aphra (2020) #16–21 | Omnibus | 744 | Apr 8, 2025 | Leinil Francis Yu cover: 978-1302961848 |
| | Star Wars: Crimson Reign Omnibus | Star Wars: Crimson Reign (2021) #1–5, Star Wars (2020) #19–25, Star Wars: Bounty Hunters (2020) #18–24, Star Wars: Darth Vader (2020) #18–24, Star Wars: Doctor Aphra (2020) #16–21 | Omnibus | 744 | Apr 8, 2025 | Rod Reis DM cover: 978-1302961855 |
Hidden Empire (2022-23)
| | Hidden Empire | Star Wars: Hidden Empire #1-5 | TPB | 128 | Jul 4, 2023 | 978-1302948009 |
| | Star Wars: Hidden Empire Omnibus | Star Wars: Hidden Empire #1-5; Star Wars (2020) #26-36; Star Wars: Bounty Hunters #27-34; Star Wars: Darth Vader (2020) #28-32; Star Wars: Doctor Aphra (2020) #22-31; Star Wars: Revelations | Omnibus | 1,000 | Feb 17, 2026 | Paulo Siqueira cover: 978-1302961886 |
| | Star Wars: Hidden Empire Omnibus | Star Wars: Hidden Empire #1-5; Star Wars (2020) #26-36; Star Wars: Bounty Hunters #27-34; Star Wars: Darth Vader (2020) #28-32; Star Wars: Doctor Aphra (2020) #22-31; Star Wars: Revelations | Omnibus | 1,000 | Feb 17, 2026 | Declan Shalvey DM cover: 978-1302961893 |
Dark Droids (2023)
| | Dark Droids | Star Wars: Dark Droids #1-5 | TPB | 136 | Mar 26, 2024 | 978-1302951481 |
| | Dark Droids - D-Squad | Star Wars: Dark Droids - D-Squad #1-4 | TPB | 112 | Mar 5, 2024 | 978-1302952082 |
| | Star Wars: Dark Droids | Star Wars: Dark Droids #1-5; Star Wars: Dark Droids – D-Squad #1-4; Star Wars (2020) #37-50; Star Wars: Bounty Hunters #37-42; Star Wars: Darth Vader (2020) #37-50; Star Wars: Doctor Aphra (2020) #35-40; Star Wars: Revelations; FCBD 2024: Star Wars | Omnibus | 1,320 | Aug 18, 2026 | Leinil Yu cover: 978-1302961862 |
| | Star Wars: Dark Droids | Star Wars: Dark Droids #1-5; Star Wars: Dark Droids – D-Squad #1-4; Star Wars (2020) #37-50; Star Wars: Bounty Hunters #37-42; Star Wars: Darth Vader (2020) #37-50; Star Wars: Doctor Aphra (2020) #35-40; Star Wars: Revelations; FCBD 2024: Star Wars | Omnibus | 1,320 | Aug 18, 2026 | Pete Woods DM cover: 978-1302961879 |

====== The High Republic ======
These books are set between 350 years and 200 years before the events of the Skywalker Saga.

| # | Subtitle | Issues collected | Format | Pages | Released | ISBN |
Phase I: Light Of The Jedi (set approx 200 years before A New Hope)
| 1 | There Is No Fear | Star Wars: The High Republic (2021) #1–5 | TPB | 120 | Aug 24, 2021 | 978-1302927530 |
| 2 | The Heart Of Drengir | Star Wars: The High Republic (2021) #6–10 | TPB | 120 | Dec 7, 2021 | 978-1302931421 |
| 3 | Jedi's End | Star Wars: The High Republic (2021) #11–15; Star Wars: The High Republic - Eye Of The Storm #1-2 | TPB | 192 | May 3, 2022 | 978-1302932770 |
| | Trail Of Shadows | Star Wars: The High Republic - Trail Of Shadows #1–5 | TPB | 112 | Apr 12, 2022 | 978-1302932985 |
| I | Star Wars: The High Republic - Light Of The Jedi | Star Wars: The High Republic (2021) #1–15; Star Wars: The High Republic – Eye Of The Storm (2022) #1–2; Star Wars: The High Republic – Trail Of Shadows (2021) #1–5 | Omnibus | 544 | Dec 17, 2023 | Phil Noto cover: 978-0785194880 |
| I | Star Wars: The High Republic - Light Of The Jedi | Star Wars: The High Republic (2021) #1–15; Star Wars: The High Republic – Eye Of The Storm (2022) #1–2; Star Wars: The High Republic – Trail Of Shadows (2021) #1–5 | Omnibus | 544 | Dec 17, 2023 | Ario Anindito DM cover: 978-0785194897 |
Phase II: Quest Of The Jedi (set approx 350 years before A New Hope)
| 1 | Balance Of The Force | Star Wars: The High Republic (2022) #1–5 | TPB | 120 | May 2, 2023 | 978-1302947026 |
| 2 | Battle For The Force | Star Wars: The High Republic (2022) #6–10 | TPB | 120 | Aug 22, 2023 | 978-1302947033 |
| | The Blade | Star Wars: The High Republic - The Blade #1-4 | TPB | 112 | Jun 27, 2023 | 978-1302948542 |
| II | Star Wars: The High Republic - Quest Of The Jedi | Star Wars: The High Republic (2022) #1-10; Star Wars: The High Republic - The Blade #1-4 | Omnibus | 360 | Nov 12, 2024 | Phil Noto cover: 978-1302958497 |
| II | Star Wars: The High Republic - Quest Of The Jedi | Star Wars: The High Republic (2022) #1-10; Star Wars: The High Republic - The Blade #1-4 | Omnibus | 360 | Nov 12, 2024 | Marc Laming DM cover: 978-1302958503 |
Phase III: Trials Of The Jedi (set immediately after Phase I)
| 1 | Children Of The Storm | Star Wars: The High Republic (2023) #1–5; Star Wars: Revelations (2023) (High Republic story) | TPB | 144 | Jun 11, 2024 | 978-1302954994 |
| 2 | The Hunted | Star Wars: The High Republic (2023) #6-10; Star Wars: The Acolyte - Kelnacca | TPB | 144 | Nov 19, 2024 | 978-1302955007 |
| | Shadows Of Starlight | Star Wars: The High Republic - Shadows Of Starlight #1-4 | TPB | 112 | Apr 30, 2025 | 978-1302956561 |
| | Fear Of The Jedi | Star Wars: The High Republic - Fear Of The Jedi #1-5; Star Wars: The High Republic - The Finale | TPB | 176 | Oct 14, 2025 | 978-1302963187 |
| III | Star Wars: The High Republic - Trials Of The Jedi | Star Wars: The High Republic (2023) #1-10, Star Wars: The Acolyte - Kelnacca; Star Wars: The High Republic - Shadows Of Starlight #1-4; Star Wars: The High Republic - Fear Of The Jedi #1-5; Star Wars: The High Republic - The Finale; material from Star Wars: Revelations (2023) | Omnibus | 528 | Apr 21, 2026 | Phil Noto cover: 978-1302961329 |
| III | Star Wars: The High Republic - Trials Of The Jedi | Star Wars: The High Republic (2023) #1-10, Star Wars: The Acolyte - Kelnacca; Star Wars: The High Republic - Shadows Of Starlight #1-4; Star Wars: The High Republic - Fear Of The Jedi #1-5; Star Wars: The High Republic - The Finale; material from Star Wars: Revelations (2023) | Omnibus | 528 | Apr 21, 2026 | Giuseppe Camuncoli DM cover: 978-1302961336 |

==== Limited series and one-shots ====
Princess Leia released in March 2015. Chewbacca (October–December 2015), Obi-Wan & Anakin (January–May 2016), and Han Solo (June–November 2016), as well as the one-shots Vader Down (November 2015) and C-3PO (April 2016). Several other limited series followed, including Kanan (April 2015 – March 2016), Lando (July–October 2015), Shattered Empire (September–October 2015),

In 2017, limited series Darth Maul, Mace Windu, and Captain Phasma, as well as further one-shots, continued to expand the Star Wars universe. The comic adaptation of Rogue One: A Star Wars Story was also released. Both the Poe Dameron and the second Darth Vader comics ended their runs in 2018, in September and December respectively.

In 2018, Marvel adapted the events of author Timothy Zahn's Star Wars: Thrawn novel in a limited series. The character had been introduced by Zahn's Heir to the Empire trilogy in the early 1990s, now part of the Legends line, and was re-introduced in the new canon in Star Wars Rebels. Adaptations of both The Last Jedi and Solo: A Star Wars Story were released, and the timeframe of Solo was explored further in the Beckett one-shot and in limited series featuring young Lando (Double or Nothing) and Han's time in the Empire (Imperial Cadet). Marvel announced in October 2018 that a five-issue, Wendig penned miniseries, Star Wars: Shadow of Vader, would be released starting in January 2019. The series would be an anthology told from the perspectives of those who had encountered Darth Vader. After three issues had been written, Wendig was removed from the miniseries (and future projects) by Marvel over concerns of his use of social media, and ultimately the miniseries was cancelled. In December 2018, a new miniseries with a similar premise, Star Wars: Vader – Dark Visions, was announced to be written by Dennis Hopeless with art from Paolo Villanelli and Brian Level and was launched in March 2019.

For 2019, Marvel announced a number of new limited series. As a companion to Star Wars: Alphabet Squadron, a novel by author Alexander Freed centered on a New Republic squadron of various Rebel ships (an A-wing interceptor, B-wing heavy assault fighter, U-wing transport, X-wing starfghter, and Y-wing bomber) in the wake of the Battle of Endor, a five-issue series called Star Wars: TIE Fighter explores the fallout of the battle from both the New Republic and Imperial Remnant sides. A five-issue miniseries titled Star Wars: Galaxy's Edge will feature stories of the Black Spire Outpost on the Outer Rim planet Batuu and tie into the theme park experiences set to open at Disneyland and Walt Disney World in 2019. In May 2019, a one-shot by writer Matthew Rosenberg and various artists called Star Wars #108 Crimson Forever picks up the story of the original Marvel Star Wars comic run that ended in 1986.

In connection with the forthcoming video game Star Wars Jedi: Fallen Order by Electronic Arts and Respawn Entertainment, a five-issue miniseries called Star Wars Jedi: Fallen Order – Dark Temple was announced in June 2019 to start publishing in September. At a panel discussing the Journey to Star Wars: The Rise of Skywalker publishing program at San Diego Comic-Con in 2019, the four-issue Star Wars: Journey to The Rise of Skywalker – Allegiance miniseries was announced. It will help cover a one-year period during the time between The Last Jedi and The Rise of Skywalker. Charles Soule was announced to be writing a four-issue miniseries exploring the backstory of Ben Solo's transition into Kylo Ren. Star Wars: The Rise of Kylo Ren premiered on December 16, 2019.

In February 2021 it was announced that Charles Soule would be writing a miniseries focusing on the events of Boba Fett between The Empire Strikes Back and Return of the Jedi, this series tied in with the rest of the ongoing Marvel series' at the time, would be called War of the Bounty Hunters - and released from May through October 2021. The story of War of the Bounty Hunters was followed by the additional miniseries Crimson Reign, also penned by Soule, which served as the second in a trilogy of stories revolving around the same cast of characters, notably Qi'ra, whose return to the Star Wars universe occurred in the pages of War of the Bounty Hunters.

Marvel (2015–present)
One-shots
Movie related
| Star Wars: C-3PO one-shot | June 2016 |
| Star Wars: Droids Unplugged one-shot | June 2017 |
| Star Wars: Rogue One – Cassian & K-2SO Special | August 2017 |
| Star Wars: The Last Jedi – Storms of Crait one-shot | December 2017 |
| Star Wars: The Last Jedi – DJ – Most Wanted one-shot | January 2018 |
| Star Wars: Beckett one-shot | August 2018 |

Marvel (2015–present)
Limited series
Film adaptations
| Star Wars: The Force Awakens #1–6 | June–November 2016 |
| Rogue One: A Star Wars Story #1–6 | April–September 2017 |
| Star Wars: The Last Jedi Adaptation #1–6 | May–September 2018 |
| Solo: A Star Wars Story #1–7 | October 2018 – April 2019 |
| Star Wars: The Rise of Skywalker Adaptation #1–5 | Feb–June 2025 |
Original storylines
| Star Wars: Princess Leia #1–5 | March–June 2015 |
| Star Wars: Lando #1–5 | July–October 2015 |
| Star Wars: Shattered Empire #1–4 | September–October 2015 |
| Star Wars: Chewbacca #1–5 | October–December 2015 |
| Star Wars: Obi-Wan & Anakin #1–5 | January–May 2016 |
| Star Wars: Han Solo #1–5 | June–November 2016 |
| Star Wars: Darth Maul #1–5 | February–July 2017 |
| Star Wars: Jedi of the Republic – Mace Windu #1–5 | August–December 2017 |
| Star Wars: Captain Phasma #1–4 | September–October 2017 |
| Star Wars: Thrawn #1–6 | February–July 2018 |
| Star Wars: Lando – Double or Nothing #1–5 | May–September 2018 |
| Star Wars: Han Solo – Imperial Cadet #1–5 | November 2018 – March 2019 |
| Star Wars: Vader – Dark Visions #1–5 | March–June 2019 |
| Star Wars: Galaxy's Edge #1–5 | April–August 2019 |
| Star Wars: TIE Fighter #1–5 | April–August 2019 |
| Star Wars: Target Vader #1–6 | July–December 2019 |
| Star Wars Jedi: Fallen Order – Dark Temple #1–5 | September–December 2019 |
| Star Wars: Journey to The Rise of Skywalker – Allegiance #1–4 | October 2019 |
| Star Wars: The Rise of Kylo Ren #1–4 | December 2019–March 2020 |
| Star Wars: War Of The Bounty Hunters #1–6 | May–October 2021 |
| Star Wars: Crimson Reign #1-5 | December 2021-June 2022 |
| Star Wars: Obi-Wan #1-5 | May–September 2022 |
| Han Solo And Chewbacca #1-10 | March 2022–March 2023 |
| Star Wars: The Mandalorian #1-8 | July 2022–March 2023 |
| Star Wars: Yoda #1-10 | November 2022–August 2023 |
| Sana Starros - Family Matters #1-5 | February–June 2023 |
| Star Wars: The Mandalorian Season Two #1-8 | June 2023–January 2024 |
| Star Wars: Obi-Wan Kenobi #1-6 | September 2023–March 2024 |
| Star Wars: Thrawn Alliances #1-4 | January–April 2024 |
| Star Wars: Mace Windu: The Twilight Run #1-4 | February–May 2024 |
| Star Wars: Jango Fett: Trail Of Lost Hope #1-4 | March–June 2024 |
| Star Wars: Inquisitors #1-4 | July–October 2024 |
| Star Wars: Ahsoka #1-8 | July 2024–February 2025 |
| Star Wars: Ewoks #1-4 | October 2024-January 2025 |
| Star Wars: Battle Of Jakku - Insurgency Rising #1-4 | October-November 2024 |
| Star Wars: Battle Of Jakku - Republic Under Siege #1-4 | November-December 2024 |
| Star Wars: Battle Of Jakku - Last Stand #1-4 | December 2024-January 2025 |

==== Age of Star Wars maxiseries ====
At San Diego Comic-Con in 2018, Marvel announced Age of Star Wars, a 27-issue maxiseries starting in December 2018 that would span all three eras of the Star Wars saga. Star Wars: Age of Republic by writer Jody Houser will focus on the time of the Galactic Republic and the Clone Wars during the prequel trilogy era; Star Wars: Age of Rebellion by writer Greg Pak will focus on the Galactic Civil War between the Empire and the Rebel Alliance during the original trilogy era; and Star Wars: Age of Resistance by writer Tom Taylor will focus on the fall of the New Republic and the struggle between the Resistance and the First Order during the sequel trilogy era. At the time of release, Age of Republic was revealed to have eight one-shots spotlighting individual characters and a special anthology issue with up to four stories by different creative teams.

Age of Star Wars maxiseries
Star Wars: Age of Republic
| Qui-Gon Jinn #1 | December 2018 |
| Darth Maul #1 | December 2018 |
| Obi-Wan Kenobi #1 | January 2019 |
| Jango Fett #1 | January 2019 |
| Special #1 | January 2019 |
| Anakin Skywalker #1 | February 2019 |
| Count Dooku #1 | February 2019 |
| Padmé Amidala #1 | March 2019 |
| General Grievous #1 | March 2019 |
Star Wars: Age of Rebellion
| Princess Leia #1 | April 2019 |
| Grand Moff Tarkin #1 | April 2019 |
| Special #1 | April 2019 |
| Han Solo #1 | May 2019 |
| Boba Fett #1 | May 2019 |
| Lando Calrissian #1 | May 2019 |
| Jabba the Hutt #1 | May 2019 |
| Luke Skywalker #1 | June 2019 |
| Darth Vader #1 | June 2019 |
Star Wars: Age of Resistance
| Finn #1 | July 2019 |
| Captain Phasma #1 | July 2019 |
| Special #1 | July 2019 |
| Poe Dameron #1 | August 2019 |
| General Hux #1 | August 2019 |
| Rose Tico #1 | September 2019 |
| Supreme Leader Snoke #1 | September 2019 |
| Rey #1 | September 2019 |
| Kylo Ren #1 | September 2019 |

- Age of Star Wars trade paperbacks:

| Title | Material collected | Year | Pages | Format | ISBN |
|---|---|---|---|---|---|
| Age of Republic – Heroes | Age of Republic: Anakin Skywalker #1, Age of Republic: Obi-Wan Kenobi #1, Age of Republic: Padme Amidala #1, Age of Republic: Qui-Gon Jinn #1 | May 2019 | 112 pages | Softcover | ISBN 978-1302917104 |
| Age of Republic – Villains | Age of Republic: Count Dooku #1, Age of Republic: Darth Maul #1, Age of Republic: General Grievous #1, Age of Republic: Jango Fett #1, Age of Republic Special #1 | May 2019 | 128 pages | Softcover | ISBN 978-1302917296 |
| Age of Rebellion – Heroes | Age of Rebellion: Han Solo #1, Age of Rebellion: Lando Calrissian #1, Age of Rebellion: Luke Skywalker #1, Age of Rebellion: Princess Leia #1 | August 2019 | 112 pages | Softcover | ISBN 978-1302917081 |
| Age of Rebellion – Villains | Age of Rebellion: Boba Fett #1, Age of Rebellion: Darth Vader #1, Age of Rebellion: Jabba the Hutt #1, Age of Rebellion: Grand Moff Tarkin #1, Age of Rebellion Special #1 | August 2019 | 128 pages | Softcover | ISBN 978-1302917289 |
| Age of Resistance – Heroes | Age of Resistance: Finn #1, Age of Resistance: Rose Tico #1, Age of Resistance: Poe Dameron #1, Age of Resistance: Rey #1, Age of Resistance Special #1 | November 2019 | 136 pages | Softcover | ISBN 978-1302917128 |
| Age of Resistance – Villains | Age of Resistance: Captain Phasma #1, Age of Resistance: General Hux #1, Age of Resistance: Kylo Ren #1, Age of Resistance: Supreme Leader Snoke #1 | December 2019 | 120 pages | Softcover | ISBN 978-1302917302 |

==== Reprints ====
In mid-2014, Marvel stated that it would publish collected volumes of past Star Wars comics, beginning with Volume 1 of Star Wars: The Original Marvel Years in January 2015, and Volume 1 of Star Wars Legends Epic Collection: The Empire in April 2015, which reprinted Dark Horse's Star Wars comics. In December 2019, Marvel reprinted the first issue of the 1977 series as Star Wars #1 – Facsimile Edition.

A series of reprints under the title True Believers: Star Wars was released in April and May 2019, celebrating Marvel's 80th anniversary. A second collection of True Believers: Star Wars titles was released in December 2019.

True Believers: Star Wars Reprints
| True Believers: Star Wars – Skywalker Strikes #1; Reprints Star Wars (2015) #1 | April 2019 |
| True Believers: Star Wars – The Ashes of Jedha #1; Reprints Star Wars (2015) #38 | April 2019 |
| True Believers: Star Wars – Darth Vader #1; Reprints Star Wars: Darth Vader (2017) #1 | April 2019 |
| True Believers: Star Wars – The Original Marvel Years #107; Reprints Star Wars (1977) #107 | April 2019 |
| True Believers: Star Wars – Ewoks #1; Reprints Star Wars: Ewoks (1985) #1 | May 2019 |
| True Believers: Star Wars – Thrawn #1; Reprints Star Wars: Thrawn (2018) #1 | May 2019 |
| True Believers: Star Wars – Darth Maul #1; Reprints Star Wars: Darth Maul (2017) #1 | May 2019 |
| True Believers: Star Wars – Rebel Jail #1; Reprints Star Wars (2015) #16 | May 2019 |
| True Believers: Star Wars – Death Probe #1; Reprints Star Wars (1977) #45 | December 2019 |
| True Believers: Star Wars – Vader vs. Leia #1; Reprints Star Wars (1977) #48 | December 2019 |
| True Believers: Star Wars – According to Droids #1; Reprints Star Wars: Droids (1986) #6 | December 2019 |
| True Believers: Star Wars – The Hunter #1; Reprints Star Wars (1977) #16 | December 2019 |
| True Believers: Star Wars – Hutt Run #1; Reprints Star Wars (2015) #35 | December 2019 |

=== IDW Publishing (2017–2022) ===
In September 2017, IDW Publishing debuted Star Wars Adventures, an anthology series published as part of the "Journey to Star Wars: The Last Jedi" publishing program.

In January 2018, IDW released a five-issue comic tie-in to Star Wars Forces of Destiny.

In November 2018, IDW released Star Wars Adventures: Destroyer Down. This three-issue miniseries reprinted the previously released Loot Crate special from December 2017.

IDW has also published graphic novel adaptations of each Star Wars film since The Force Awakens.

IDW Publishing
Ongoing series
| Star Wars Adventures (vol. 1) #0-32, three Annuals, FCBD '18 and '19 Specials | September 2017 – July 2020 |
| Star Wars Adventures (vol. 2) #1-14, and two Annuals | September 2020 – February 2022 |
| Star Wars: The High Republic Adventures #1-13, and one Annual | February 2021 – February 2022 |
Limited series and one-shots
| Star Wars Adventures: Forces of Destiny #1-5 | January 2018 |
| Star Wars Adventures: Tales from Vader's Castle #1-5 | October 2018 |
| Star Wars Adventures: Destroyer Down #1-3 | November 2018 – January 2019 |
| Star Wars Adventures: Flight of the Falcon one-shot | January 2019 |
| Star Wars Adventures: Return to Vader's Castle #1-5 | October 2019 |
| Star Wars Adventures: The Clone Wars – Battle Tales #1-5 | May 2020 – September 2020 |
| Star Wars Adventures: Shadow of Vader's Castle one-shot | November 2020 |
| Star Wars Adventures: Smuggler's Run #1-2 | December 2020 – January 2021 |
| Star Wars Adventures: The Weapon of a Jedi #1-2 | May 2021 – June 2021 |
| Star Wars: The High Republic Adventures — The Monster of Temple Peak #1-4 | August 2021 – November 2021 |
| Star Wars Adventures: Ghosts of Vader's Castle #1-5 | September – October 2021 |
| Star Wars: The High Republic Adventures: Galactic Bake-Off Spectacular one-shot | January 2022 |

=== Return to Dark Horse (2022–present) ===
On November 18, 2021, it was announced that Dark Horse Comics would once again publish Star Wars comics beginning around the second quarter of 2022. This will include a new line of all-ages comics and graphic novels. In a follow-up article, StarWars.com revealed that the first entries to modern Dark Horse storytelling will be Star Wars: Hyperspace Stories (released August 10, 2022), and Star Wars: Tales From the Rancor Pit, (arriving October 19, 2022) - both series will follow an all-ages anthology style format.

Dark Horse's first entry to The High Republic era of the Star Wars timeline was announced at Star Wars Celebration Anaheim 2022. The statement at Star Wars Celebration consisted of an announcement of Dark Horse's creation of a new The High Republic: Adventures series, the first issue of which titled The Nameless Terror.

The publisher also published a collected edition of Star Wars Rebels comic books from the Star Wars: Rebels Magazine, on August 16, 2022.

== See also ==
- List of Star Wars comic books, an in-universe "chronological" list of comics
- Star Wars (UK comics), a British publication which reprints some of the Dark Horse comics
- Star Wars (manga)
