= Angel Unzueta =

Spanish comic book artist

- Areas: Penciller, Inker, Colourist

Angel Unzueta (/ˌʊnzuˈɛtə/) is a Spanish comic book artist.

== Selected works ==
- 2000 AD #1076 "Danse Macabre" (Fleetway, 1998)
- Legion of Super-Heroes vol. 4, #124–125 (DC Comics, 2000)
- The Flash #164–169 (DC, 2000–2001)
- Green Lantern Corps vol. 2 #14–17 (DC, 2007)
- Titans vol. 2 #12–13, 16–19, 21–22 (DC, 2009–2010)
- Teen Titans vol. 4 #23–24 (DC, 2013)
- Death of Wolverine: The Weapon X Program #4–5 (Marvel Comics, 2014–2015)
- Star Wars: Shattered Empire #2–3 (Marvel, 2015)
- Star Wars Annual #1 (Marvel, 2015)
- Avengers: Standoff! Assault on Pleasant Hill Omega #1 (Marvel, 2016)
- Captain America: Sam Wilson #7, 9–10, 15–16, 19 (Marvel, 2016–)
- Star Wars: Poe Dameron #7, #14– (Marvel, 2016–)
