= Star Wars (2015 comic book) =

Comic book series

- Issue #1 cover (January 2015)

Publication information
- Publisher: Marvel Comics
- Schedule: Monthly
- Format: Ongoing series
- Genre: Science fiction
- Publication date: January 2015 – present
- No. of issues: 75 + Annuals #1-4 (2015); 50 (2020)

Creative team
- Written by: Jason Aaron (2015–2017); Kieron Gillen (2017–2019); Greg Pak (2019); Charles Soule (2020–2024)
- Artists: John Cassaday (#1–6); Simone Bianchi (#7); Stuart Immonen (#8–12); Mike Deodato (#13–14); Mike Mayhew (#15, #20); Leinil Francis Yu (#16–19); Jorge Molina (#21–25); Salvador Larroca (#26–55); Angel Unzueta (#56–60, #63–67); Andrea Broccardo (#61–62); Phil Noto (#68–75); Jesus Saiz (2020 #1–6)

Collected editions
- Skywalker Strikes: ISBN 0-7851-9213-1
- Showdown on the Smuggler's Moon: ISBN 0-7851-9214-X
- Vader Down: ISBN 0-7851-9789-3
- Rebel Jail: ISBN 0-7851-9983-7
- Last Flight of the Harbinger: ISBN 0-7851-9984-5
- Yoda's Secret War: ISBN 1-302-90265-2
- The Screaming Citadel: ISBN 1-302-90678-X
- Out Among the Stars: ISBN 1-302-90553-8
- The Ashes of Jedha: ISBN 1-302-91052-3
- Mutiny at Mon Cala: ISBN 1-302-91053-1
- Hope Dies: ISBN 1-302-91054-X
- The Escape: ISBN 1-302-91449-9
- The Scourging of Shu-Torun: ISBN 1-302-91450-2
- Rebels and Rogues: ISBN 1-302-91451-0
- Rogues and Rebels: ISBN 1-302-92168-1

Star Wars is an ongoing Star Wars comic series published by Marvel Comics since January 14, 2015. Originally written by Jason Aaron with art by John Cassaday, it is set between the 1977 film Star Wars and its 1980 sequel, The Empire Strikes Back, much like the previous comic published in 2013 by Dark Horse Comics. The series features classic Star Wars characters Luke Skywalker, Princess Leia, Han Solo, Chewbacca, C-3PO, and R2-D2. It was one of three new Star Wars comics by Marvel announced in July 2014, along with Darth Vader and the limited series Princess Leia.

It marks the return of the Star Wars license to Marvel Comics, and the first instance of the latter publishing the former's material since the original comic book adaptation back in 1977, as well as its adaptation of The Empire Strikes Back in 1980-to-1981, before the rights were sold to Dark Horse Comics in 1991-to-2014, until The Walt Disney Company bought out Lucasfilm and its subsidiaries in 2012 (having bought out Marvel Entertainment the year prior) and Dark Horse relinquished the rights back to Marvel in 2015 (but not before publishing their final title with the license, Darth Maul: Son of Dathomir). However, in 2022, Lucasfilm and Marvel would enact a dual distribution deal with both IDW Publishing and Dark Horse Comics to publish new Star Wars comic series again.

In 2017, Aaron stepped down as the comic's writer and was replaced by Kieron Gillen, while the art was taken over by Salvador Larroca. In 2019, Marvel announced that the series would be finished after 75 issues. The series was relaunched with issue #1 on January 1, 2020, continuing the story after the events of The Empire Strikes Back, written by Charles Soule with art by Jesus Saiz.

== Plot ==
The Star Wars series focuses on Luke, Leia and Han's continued conflict against the Galactic Empire with their fellow Rebel allies soon after the destruction of the first Death Star. As the series begins, Leia leads a covert Rebel mission to destroy an Imperial weapons factory, attracting the attention of Darth Vader. In issues #4–5, Luke returns to Tatooine, searching Obi-Wan Kenobi's abandoned house for anything of interest regarding Obi-Wan or his father. He fights Boba Fett but also discovers Obi-Wan's journals, which Luke reads in issues #7, #15, #20, and #26–30. In issue #6, Fett reveals to Vader that the Rebel pilot who destroyed the Death Star is named Skywalker; the issue also introduces Sana Starros, who is dramatically introduced as Han Solo's wife Sana Solo before revealed to be only legally married to him on one planet during a previous scam, after which Han had stolen her cut. She becomes a recurring character. Issues #13–14 are part of the "Vader Down" crossover with the Darth Vader comic series. In issues #16–19, the Rebels enlist the help of antagonist Doctor Aphra. Issues #21–25 involve capturing a Star Destroyer. Issues #26–30 flash back to Yoda's history before the events of The Phantom Menace, as recounted in Obi-Wan's journals. Issues #31–32 are part of "The Screaming Citadel" crossover with the Doctor Aphra series. In issues #38–43, the Rebels fight to prevent the Imperials from obtaining kyber crystals on Jedha. In issues #44–49, they try to recruit Mon Cala to the Rebel cause even as the world experiences local unrest. In issues #50–55, the Mon Calamari, including Admiral Ackbar, join their cause, even as Queen Trios of Shu-Torun betrays them, allowing the Empire to attack. Issues #56–61 sees the Rebellion crippled and scattered. In issues #62–67, Leia strikes back against Queen Trios with the aid of the unorthodox Partisans. The closing story arc, told in issues #68–75, sees the Rebels avoiding Imperial probe droids, getting wrapped up in a crime syndicate's conflict with the Empire, and aiding the rock creatures of an unstable world against Imperial forces led by Vader.

The 2020 relaunch picks up before the epilogue of The Empire Strikes Back, when Lando Calrissian returns to Cloud City to retrieve Lobot and help Luke look for his lightsaber. Unable to locate his old weapon, Luke learns of a High Republic-era Jedi outpost, where he finds a yellow lightsaber and battles the spirit of the Grand Inquisitor. Leia leads the Rebellion (including the parents of Poe Dameron), but their security codes are compromised by the Empire, forcing the Rebels to improvise. Subsequently, in the War of the Bounty Hunters crossover event, the Rebels try to rescue the frozen Han from Crimson Dawn (led by his old flame Qi'ra), but Fett is able to recover his prize and deliver it to Jabba the Hutt. Crimson Dawn's story continues in the Crimson Reign crossover event and the spin-off miniseries Hidden Empire, while the Rebels prepare to mount their last stand against the Empire.

== Characters and development ==
Aaron said in 2014, "We wanted this to feel like the movies. We wanted to feel like we were hired to do the direct sequel to the original film ... It's very much a team book and we've got all the main players here. Luke, Han, Leia, Chewie, the droids, and Darth Vader all get big moments in this first arc, and that's our core cast going forward." He explained that Luke's story is a main thrust of the comic, considering where the character is at this point in the timeline, adding:

"This is all pretty new to him. His world has changed completely. He had this mentor for five minutes who now is dead and leaves him with all these questions about his father, about his history, and where he goes from here, and what’s his role in the grand scheme of things ... He's on this journey of discovery by himself, and he wants to find out more about his father. Meanwhile, Darth Vader's chasing after him trying to find out who's this guy that blew up the Death Star. I like the fact that they’re kind of chasing each other, without realizing the full implication of what they're chasing. Luke’s chasing after his dad while running away from Vader."

Aaron also noted that Han is in "an interesting spot at this point in the timeline ... We don't know how fully committed he is to this Rebellion, and we're in the very early stages of his relationship with Leia ... And of course, you know with Han, eventually his past is going to start catching up to him."

== Publication ==
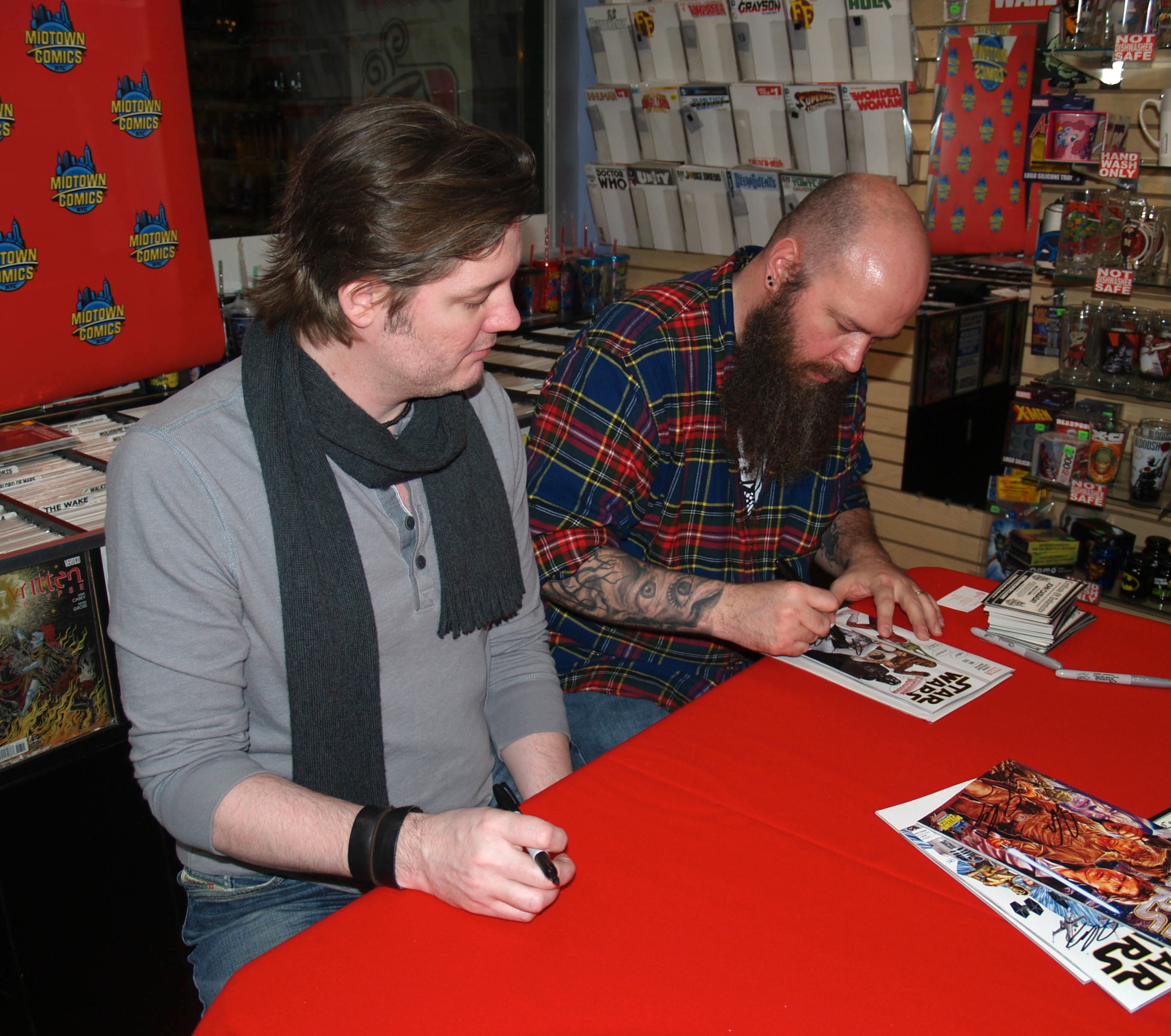
Artist John Cassaday (left) and writer Jason Aaron (right) at a January 2015 signing at Midtown Comics in Manhattan for Star Wars #1, the first Star Wars comic published by Marvel since 1987.

Star Wars was one of three new Star Wars comics by Marvel announced in July 2014, along with Princess Leia and Darth Vader. The Star Wars comic was set to be written by Jason Aaron and illustrated by John Cassaday, and released in January 2015. Several variant covers were printed for the first issue. Simone Bianchi was the guest artist for issue #7. Stuart Immonen took over as artist with issue #8 in July 2015, completing the series' second story arc through issue #12.

In 2017, Aaron stepped down as the comic's writer and was replaced by Kieron Gillen, while the art was taken over by Salvador Larroca. In 2019, Marvel announced that the series would be finished after 75 issues. The series was relaunched with issue #1 on January 1, 2020, continuing the story after the events of The Empire Strikes Back, written by Charles Soule with art by Jesus Saiz.

== Collected editions ==
=== Trade paperback ===
Title	Material collected	Published date	ISBN
2015 Series
Star Wars Vol. 1: Skywalker Strikes	Star Wars #1–6	October 6, 2015	978-0-7851-9213-8
Star Wars Vol. 2: Showdown on the Smuggler's Moon	Star Wars #7–12	January 26, 2016	978-0-7851-9214-5
Star Wars: Vader Down	Star Wars #13–14, Star Wars: Vader Down #1, Darth Vader #13–15	April 19, 2016	978-0-7851-9789-8
Star Wars Vol. 3: Rebel Jail	Star Wars #15–19, Annual #1	August 16, 2016	978-0-7851-9983-0
Star Wars Vol. 4: Last Flight of the Harbinger	Star Wars #20–25	January 31, 2017	978-0-7851-9984-7
Star Wars Vol. 5: Yoda's Secret War	Star Wars #26–30, Annual #2	July 18, 2017	978-1-302-90265-0
Star Wars: The Screaming Citadel	Star Wars #31–32, Star Wars: The Screaming Citadel #1, Star Wars: Doctor Aphra #7–8	October 24, 2017	978-1-302-90678-8
Star Wars Vol. 6: Out Among the Stars	Star Wars #33–37, Annual #3	December 5, 2017	978-1-302-90553-8
Star Wars Vol. 7: The Ashes of Jedha	Star Wars #38–43	April 17, 2018	978-1-302-91052-5
Star Wars Vol. 8: Mutiny at Mon Cala	Star Wars #44–49	August 7, 2018	978-1-302-91053-2
Star Wars Vol. 9: Hope Dies	Star Wars #50–55, Annual #4	December 25, 2018	978-1-302-91054-9
Star Wars Vol. 10: The Escape	Star Wars #56–61	April 9, 2019	978-1-302-91449-3
Star Wars Vol. 11: The Scourging of Shu-Torun	Star Wars #62–67	August 13, 2019	978-1-302-91450-9
Star Wars Vol. 12: Rebels and Rogues	Star Wars #68–72	November 19, 2019	978-1-302-91451-6
Star Wars Vol. 13: Rogues and Rebels	Star Wars #73–75, Empire Ascendant #1	March 17, 2020	978-1-302-92168-2
Star Wars: From the Journals of Obi-Wan Kenobi	Star Wars #7, 15, 20, 26–30; and material from Star Wars #37	November 10, 2020	978-1-302-92528-4
2020 Series
Star Wars Vol. 1: The Destiny Path	Star Wars #1–6	November 10, 2020	978-1-302-92078-4
Star Wars Vol. 2: Operation Starlight	Star Wars #7–11	April 6, 2021	978-1-302-92079-1
Star Wars Vol. 3: War of the Bounty Hunters	Star Wars #12–18	January 4, 2022	978-1-302-92080-7
Star Wars Vol. 4: Crimson Reign	Star Wars #19–25	September 14, 2022	978-1-302-92618-2
Star Wars Vol. 5: The Path To Victory	Star Wars #26–30	May 16, 2023	978-1-302-93274-9
Star Wars Vol. 6: Quests of the Force	Star Wars #31–36	September 26, 2023	978-1-302-94808-5

=== Hardcover ===
Title	Material collected	Published date	ISBN
2015 Series
Star Wars: Volume 1	Star Wars #1–12	September 20, 2016	978-1-302-90098-4
Star Wars: Volume 2	Star Wars #15–25, Annual #1	June 20, 2017	978-1-302-90374-9
Star Wars: Volume 3	Star Wars #26–30, 33–37, Annual #2–3	July 17, 2018	978-1-302-90903-1
Star Wars by Jason Aaron Omnibus	Star Wars #1–37, Star Wars: Vader Down #1, Darth Vader #13–15, Star Wars: The Screaming Citadel #1, Star Wars: Doctor Aphra #7–8, Star Wars Annual #1–3	May 10, 2022	978-1-302-93409-5
Star Wars: The Marvel Covers	All covers for Star Wars #1–6, Darth Vader #1–6, Princess Leia #1–5	October 7, 2015	978-0-7851-9838-3
