= Star Wars: Princess Leia =

2015 comic book limited series

- Cover of the trade paperback

Publication information
- Publisher: Marvel Comics
- Format: Limited series
- Genre: Science fiction
- Publication date: March – July 2015
- No. of issues: 5

Creative team
- Written by: Mark Waid
- Artist: Terry Dodson
- Inker: Rachel Dodson
- Letterer: Joe Caramagna
- Colorist: Jordie Bellaire
- Editor: Jordan D. White

Collected editions
- Star Wars: Princess Leia: ISBN 978-0785193173

Star Wars: Princess Leia is a five-issue Star Wars comic book limited series, centered on Princess Leia immediately following the events of the 1977 film Star Wars. In the story, Leia and Rebel pilot Evaan Verlaine attempt to rescue the survivors of the planet Alderaan's destruction from the Empire. Announced alongside the ongoing comics Star Wars and Star Wars: Darth Vader, the series was published by Marvel Comics from March to July 2015 with Mark Waid as writer, Terry Dodson as artist and Jordie Bellaire as colorist.

At the time considered the weakest of three initial comics, Princess Leia received generally positive reviews. The issues were collected in a trade paperback, released November 3, 2015.

== Plot ==
At the medal ceremony at the end of Star Wars: A New Hope, Princess Leia of Alderaan says a few words in remembrance of her destroyed planet, but is criticized for her seeming lack of emotion. She learns that the Empire is hunting any surviving citizens of Alderaan, and the bounty on her own head precludes her from actively participating with the Rebellion. Leia convinces the Rebel pilot and royalist Evaan Verlainem to accompany her and R2-D2 on a mission to find and protect the remaining Alderaanians. X-wing fighter pilots Luke Skywalker and Wedge Antilles pursue them, but the trio escape to Naboo.

On Naboo, Leia meets with an old acquaintance, Lord Junn, to find the location of the Musical Order, a group of Alderaanian musicians. The Order have a cloister vow to only interact with other Alderaanians in order to keep their musical culturally pure, and their leader Pareece has kept the knowledge of Alderaan's destruction from them. Leia and Evaan soon find that they have been led into a trap, but Pareece saves their lives. Confronting Junn for his betrayal, Leia takes a ship instead of his life, and flees with the Order in tow. However, a member of the Order named Tace contacts her sister Tula, unaware that Tula has joined the Empire.

Leia, Evaan and R2 search Sullust for a group of Alderaanians hiding in one of the planet's cave systems. Here they meet Nien Nunb, a native of Sullust, who helps them in finding the Alderaanians. Led by Jora Astane, these survivors have forsworn Alderaanian culture and are wary of Leia's party, especially when they intercept transmissions from an Imperial ship arriving in orbit on Leia's trail. R2 turns the native wildlife on the invading Imperials, and Jora agrees to serve Leia. She and Evaan are determined to find out who in their group leaked their location to the Empire.

Jora identifies Tace as the traitor, though Leia soon realizes that she was unaware of Tula's alliance with the Empire. Leia tasks Tace to question Tula, who is taken into custody when the Imperials realizes that she has been exposed. Meanwhile, reunification talks with Alderaanians on Espirion are ruined when Jora reacts with disgust at the interbreeding of Alderaanians with the alien natives. Leia arranges with the Imperial commander to exchange herself for Tula.

Luckily, Evaan and Nien Nunb come and rescue Leia as part of a planned double-cross. Though countless ships piloted by other Alderaanians arrive to join Leia, they are outnumbered by the Imperial forces. The Imperials, however, plan on destroying all the Alderaan ships, and a space battle ensues, though without the help of the Alder-Espirions Leia knows the Imperials will win. At this moment, Nien Nunb launches a decoy, fooling the Imperial vessels by making them follow a decoy sensor, which allows Princess Leia and the Alderaanians to slip past in their ship. This leads the crew of the main star destroyer to believe that Leia has been killed. Really, at that exact moment, Leia is broadcasting a message to all her Alderaanian allies across the galaxy. The battle is turned when the Alder-Espirions join the fight, having viewed Leia's speech thanks to R2-D2 who sent the message to them. With the battle won, Leia leaves to help the Rebellion again, telling Evaan to have the Alderaanians elect a new princess and endorsing Evaan as a candidate.

== Publication history ==
Seeking a writer, editor Jordan D. White approached Mark Waid, whose favorite character was Leia. Princess Leia was one of three new Star Wars comics by Marvel announced in July 2014, along with Star Wars and Darth Vader. It is a self-contained miniseries, but is set in the same rough time period as Star Wars and Darth Vader in order to allow readers who want to read more than one to get a "broader picture and a richer story".

== Reception ==
In a ranking of the then-eight Marvel comics, IGN's Joshua Yehl placed Princess Leia sixth, noting that he felt every Marvel comic released was "good, if not great". Yehl praised the story as well as the art.

Alice Castle, writing for Multiversity Comics rated the first issue 6.8 out of 10 and called it the "weakest" of the then-released Marvel Star Wars comics. Although she praised the premise behind the comic, she was critical of the "stilted and forced" dialogue and felt the issue did little to connect the reader with Leia. Nonetheless, she lauded the art and its "vibrant" colors, calling it "the best looking of Marvel's Star Wars comics so far". IGN's Jesse Schedeen gave the issue a 7 out of 10, praising the characterization but the scene where Leia and Luke interact as well as Terry Dodson's art, which Schedeen felt failed to distinguish between the two leads and lacked "clarity" in faces. Comic Book Resources' Doug Zawisza praised the issue.

Schedeen gave the third issue a 7.9 out of 10, continuing to praise the characterization and the increasing-endearingness of Evaan. Calling the issue more action-orientated, Schedeen felt this helped offset the book's visual problems. However, Schedeen felt the refugees' turn from distrusting to supporting Leia was sudden and poorly done. Maltby rated the issue 7 out of 10 and felt the issue, while still good, did not live up to previous ones. Though he complimented the characters of Leia and Evaan as "well-realized", he criticized the refugees' leader, the Preserver, being too easily convinced to join Leia.

The fourth issue got a 7.1 from Schedeen. He commented that, although he felt Princess Leia had the "strongest start" of the Star Wars comics, it had lost appeal over time, putting some blame on the "declining quality of Terry Dodson's art". Schedeen also criticised the issue for switching between two plotlines "at random" and thus becoming disjointed.

== Sales ==
Princess Leia #1 was the best-selling comic of March 2015, ultimately becoming the tenth best-selling issue of 2015 for Diamond Comic Distributors. The trade paperback sold an estimated 6,782 copies to comic specialty stores in November 2015, coming after Star Wars: Shattered Empire as the third highest-selling graphic novel that month.
