= Star Wars: Poe Dameron =

Comic book series

- Issue #1 cover (April 2016)

Publication information
- Publisher: Marvel Comics
- Schedule: Monthly
- Format: Ongoing series
- Genre: Science fiction
- Publication date: April 2016 – September 2018
- No. of issues: 31 + Annuals #1-2

Creative team
- Written by: Charles Soule
- Artist(s): Phil Noto (#1–6, 8–13); Angel Unzueta (#7, 14–31)
- Letterer: Joe Caramagna
- Editor: Jordan D. White

Star Wars: Poe Dameron is a Star Wars comic book series which centers on Poe Dameron, the Resistance X-wing fighter pilot introduced in the 2015 film Star Wars: The Force Awakens. The series is written by Charles Soule and was first illustrated by Phil Noto, and later Angel Unzueta. It is set immediately before The Force Awakens.

Published by Marvel Comics, Poe Dameron debuted on April 6, 2016. In June 2018, Marvel announced that the series would end on September 26, 2018 with issue #31.

== Plot ==
Resistance General Leia Organa tasks her star pilot Poe Dameron to find Lor San Tekka—an explorer who may know where the last Jedi Luke Skywalker is hiding—before the First Order does. Accompanying Poe and his astromech droid BB-8 are pilots Snap Wexley, Karé Kun, L'ulo L'ampar, and Jessika Pava, collectively known as Black Squadron. Also on Tekka's trail is the menacing Agent Terex, an officer in the First Order Security Bureau who soon becomes Poe's nemesis.

Following the events of The Last Jedi, Poe fills Finn and Rey in on what happened to him during the events of The Force Awakens. Poe then goes on a solo mission to help Black Squadron and bring them back to the Resistance.

== Characters and development ==
The look of titular character Poe Dameron is patterned on Oscar Isaac, who portrayed Poe in The Force Awakens. He and his droid BB-8 are joined in their missions by X-wing pilots Snap Wexley, a character played by Greg Grunberg in the film and resembling the actor in the comic, and Jess Pava, also from The Force Awakens, where she is played by Jessica Henwick. The series also includes cameos by Leia, appearing in Carrie Fisher's likeness as in the film, and stormtrooper commander Captain Phasma (Gwendoline Christie). New characters include Resistance pilots Karé Kun and L'ulo L'ampar, as well as X-wing tech Oddy Muva. Poe Dameron also introduces a new villain, Agent Terex of the First Order Security Bureau, a cocky ex-stormtrooper whom series creator Charles Soule describes as "fresh and cool". Soule said of Terex in February 2016, "He's a scary guy, a little older, which I think gives him a cool gravitas in much the same way Peter Cushing delivered as Grand Moff Tarkin in A New Hope. His approach to conflicts is very interesting, and he can be a charmer. I think of him almost like an evil Lando."

Poe Dameron is set prior to the events The Force Awakens, leading up to the opening of the film when Poe finds Tekka on the planet Jakku. Soule explained that at this time, "The New Republic and the First Order are in a position of detente, and while there have been a few small skirmishes between the Resistance and the First Order, it's very much a sort of cold war." He compared the series to a Mission: Impossible film starring Poe, and noted that "the Star Wars galaxy is a dangerous place, and the First Order isn't the only opponent Poe will face". Soule later elaborated:

I think of it like a bunch of different genre movies, stacked up one after the other. I've been doing this for a while, actually—Lando was a heist movie, and Obi-Wan & Anakin is a post-apocalyptic steampunk western. Poe will be the same, with each arc feeling a bit different. The first story is straight-up weird, '70s sci-fi, but there's plenty more to come—a prison story, an espionage tale—lots of great stuff.

Soule said that the series would take advantage of the fact that the Star Wars fictional universe "is really flexible as far as what it can include ... there doesn't seem to be many limits on what you might find in the weirder corners of space." Artist Phil Noto said that, while "trying to take some visual cues from the movies and apply them to the different environments in the book", he hopes to establish the comic's new locations "as something new and unique while having that traditional Star Wars feel to them". Soule and Noto tried to capture Isaac's personality and likeness "so people feel like it's really Poe from the film," with Noto adding that "I think Oscar did a great job with the humor and heroism of the character." Soule also writes dialogue for BB-8 in English, which Noto uses when drawing. It is then "translated" by assistant editor Heather Antos into droid sounds the team calls "bleeps and bloops", which are spelled out in the panels by letterer Joe Caramagna.

== Publication ==
Charles Soule was contracted to write Poe Dameron before The Force Awakens was released in December 2015, and he began working on it after seeing the film. The series was announced in January 2016, to be written by Soule and illustrated by Phil Noto. With Brian Truitt of USA Today calling Poe one of the "breakout characters" of the film, Soule said, "to see people reacting to him so strongly now just feels like we're hopefully in a great position". Noto said, "I've seen people on Twitter and Instagram looking for Poe Dameron in the comics. Now the pressure's on us to deliver." The first issue was released on April 6, 2016.

The first issue contains a "Bill Watterson-esque" backup story called "SaBBotage" from writer/artist Chris Eliopoulos and colorist Jordie Bellaire which features BB-8 playing matchmaker. Angel Unzueta took over as the series' the regular artist in issue #14, after previously working on issue #7.

In June 2018, Marvel announced that the series would end on September 26, 2018, with issue #31, days before the launch of the animated series Star Wars Resistance.

== Reception ==
Jesse Schedeen of IGN wrote, "Soule captures all of Oscar Isaac's roguish charm in his depiction of Poe". Alex Brown of Tor.com agreed, noting "Soule has perfectly captured Oscar Isaac"s puppy dog playfulness". Jim Johnson of Comic Book Resources, writing that "Poe's characterization is played safely within the context established in the movie, without any real surprises or attempts to advance his character," called the first issue "a conservative but well-executed take on a fan-favorite character". While acknowledging the creative limits presumably set by Lucasfilm on spin-off works, Schedeen criticized the first issue for "sticking too close to the confines of The Force Awakens". He also wrote that "Noto's clean, crisp art impresses, even if his style is a bit disappointingly straightforward compared to past works." Brown suggested that the artist's work "handily reproduces the cast in fine detail, leaning heavier on realism than most comic books".

== In other media ==
Agent Terex, a character who exclusively appeared in this series, appeared in an update for the mobile game Star Wars: Force Arena, available for iOS and Android on December 10, 2017, which introduced more content from the Star Wars sequel trilogy. He is a summonable unique assistant for any Dark Side squad led by Captain Phasma.

The story of the pilots of Black Squadron has continued after the comic series' end. Poe Dameron, Snap Wexley, Jess Pava, Karé Kun, and Suralinda Javos appeared in the 2019 novel Resistance Reborn. Snap Wexley appeared on-screen in The Rise of Skywalker, and the rest of the squadron appeared in its novelization.

In celebration of Charles Soule's 100th Star Wars comic script, Star Wars (2020) issue #25 saw him revisit four of his previous comic series, including Star Wars: Poe Dameron. The five-page story saw the surviving pilots mourn the loss of Snap Wexley after his death in The Rise of Skywalker.
