= Star Wars: Knights of the Old Republic (comics) =

Comic Book Series

- First issue of Star Wars: Knights of the Old Republic, dated January 2006.

Publication information
- Publishing company: Dark Horse Comics
- Subject: Star Wars
- Genre: Science fiction
- Schedule: Monthly
- Format: Ongoing
- Release date(s): January 2006 – February 2010
- Country: United States
- Language: English

Creative team
- Script writer: John Jackson Miller
- Artist(s): Brian Ching, Bong Dazo

Star Wars: Knights of the Old Republic is a 2006 monthly Star Wars comic book series published by Dark Horse Comics. It takes place in the same timeline as the video games of the same name, eight years prior to the first game. The series ran for 50 issues. In 2012, a five-issue miniseries was released as a follow-up titled Star Wars: Knights of the Old Republic: War.

The title was written by John Jackson Miller, who also authored the novels Star Wars: Kenobi and Star Wars: Knight Errant, and eventually Star Wars: A New Dawn, a prequel to the CGI animated series Star Wars Rebels for Disney XD.

== Synopsis ==
Zayne Carrick, a young Padawan training at the Jedi Academy on Taris is given one last chance at capturing a notorious Snivvian smuggler known as Marn "Gryph" Hierogryph which will allow him to be promoted to Jedi Knight at the academy graduation ceremony the very same day. After numerous hurdles along the way, Zayne manages to capture Gryph, but is late to the graduation ceremony. Upon arriving back at the academy, Zayne is horrified to find the Jedi Masters, his included, standing over the slain corpses of his fellow Padawans. Instinctively, he flees from the scene with Gryph and the two are soon framed for the murder of the Padawans. With no other option, Zayne must now learn the ins and outs of being an outlaw, with Gryph as his mentor, hoping to stay alive long enough to clear his name and discover the reason why the Jedi Masters murdered his friends at the academy.

== Main characters ==
=== Zayne Carrick ===
A young Padawan who trained at the Jedi Academy on Taris. He is a kind-hearted young man who has a dubious connection with the Force at best. He is also a bit clumsy, unlucky, and danger-prone, but he always tries to do the right thing and helps others when he can. When he was framed for the murder of his fellow students by the Jedi Masters, he found himself stuck as Gryph's "henchman" and has since been searching the Galaxy for a way to clear his name and bring the Jedi Masters to justice. Zayne was finally proven innocent after the Vindication Storyline but stands with the friends that believed in him as opposed to the Jedi Order that did not.

=== Marn "Gryph" Hierogryph ===
A Snivvian smuggler whose bark is much worse than his bite. Gryph has always had a dream about becoming a big, notorious criminal, but his crimes usually go unnoticed compared to other lowlife in the galaxy. He is notoriously greedy and will do almost anything to make a few easy credits, no matter how much danger it may bring to him and his companions. Despite this, he is far from a cold-hearted murderer and has shown compassion more than once while traveling with Zayne. He also has a seemingly endless supply of underworld connections when it comes to dealing with low-life criminals around the galaxy. He starts the series addressing Zayne as a Jedi "intern", but later promotes him to "henchman" when the two begin working together officially.

=== Jarael ===
A young female Arkanian offshoot who acts as Camper's bodyguard. Camper had saved Jarael's life long ago, and since then, in an effort to repay him, she has been protecting him from those who would seek to harm him. She is a bit brash and easily angered, especially when it comes to the well-being of Camper, but she is an excellent fighter and loyal friend. She often refers to Camper as "Perero" which means "Honored Elder" in Arkanian, showing that she deeply respects and honors the old man. It has been revealed that before she met Camper, she was a slaver.

=== Gorman "Camper" Vandrayk ===
Camper is an elderly Arkanian offshoot inventor and mechanic who fled his home planet of Arkania with Jarael due to being hunted by an Arkanian corporation known as Adascorp. Due to his old age, Camper's memory has begun to fade and he has slowly turned senile over the years, claiming he cannot even remember his real name anymore. However, he is still an expert mechanic and can repair and modify just about any ship or droid he sets his eyes on. His mental and physical health has only worsened over the time he has spent traveling the galaxy with Zayne, and Jarael has become more and more concerned for him. His real name is revealed in issue 18 to be Gorman Vandrayk.

=== Elbee ===
One of the large, bulky labor droids that was used at the Jedi Academy on Taris. Elbee was destroyed by the Jedi Masters on a Padawan training mission to the Rogue Moon in order to keep their plan of killing the Padawans a secret. When Zayne returns to the Rogue Moon to search for clues, he finds the remains of Elbee which Camper then tries to fix. Most of Elbee's components were beyond repair so Camper used various parts from other droids to fix Elbee. Labor drones were made to take orders without question, but due to having the mind of a high-end droid, Elbee constantly questions the orders he is given and has to be either convinced or tricked into doing anything. Despite this, Elbee is extremely strong and useful for hauling cargo, people, and even fighting. He may be named as a tribute to Herman Melville's short story Bartleby, as both its eponymous character and Elbee share the catchphrase "I would prefer not to."

=== Rohlan Dyre ===
A Mandalorian soldier who has been in more battles than most people have heard of. Rohlan is an incredible warrior who claims he could have been Mand'alor if his true desire was not being on the frontlines of combat rather than studying maps. Over the years, however, he began questioning what the Mandalorian Wars were really about. He soon came to the conclusion that the war against the Republic had no real purpose, and the Mandalorians had degenerated from pragmatic warriors to treacherous bandits. He has since then tried to flee the battle and escape the war, but has been caught each time and returned to the battlefield, where he will be forced to fight in the Mandalorian Wars until the day he dies. When he encounters the crew of the Last Resort on Flashpoint, he sees his opportunity to escape from the war and stows away on their ship, eventually coming to the aid of Jarael and Camper after they are attacked by an HK-24 assassin droid and decides to travel with them. His legend grows among the Mandalorian ranks even more after his actions at Flashpoint station, with Mand'alor taking advantage of the legend of "Roland the Questioner" for propaganda.

== Supporting characters ==
=== Lucien Draay ===
Son of Barison Draay and Lady Krynda, Jedi Knights who fought against Exar Kun during the Great Sith War, and Jedi Master to Padawan Zayne Carrick. Heir to a long and rich legacy, both financial and in the Force, Lucien was just a boy when the Sith War ended. By that time his father had fallen along with countless other Jedi such as his aunt (Lady Krynda's sister) and Master Vodo-Siosk Baas (Lady Krynda's master), and Lucien grew up resentful of his mother's seeming lack of love or interest for him caused by her feelings of guilt over the events of the war. Although Lucien did not inherit his mother's gift of foresight, he showed great potential as a Jedi warrior. Due to the Jedi Order's limited numbers by war's end, Lucien originally trained under the tutelage of Hazeen, a former Jedi Padawan who barely survived the war and was now Lady Krynda's aid. Unbeknownst to the Jedi Council, they established a covenant that would train only the best Jedi seers with the clear purpose of stopping the Sith menace on its tracks should it ever resurface, using the financial resources of the Draay trust. At the behest of Hazeen, Lucien was eventually appointed as the executive officer of this group of Jedi operatives, which included masters Xamar, Q'Anilia, Feln and Raana Tey. Stationed in the Taris, the masters were assigned Jedi Padawans at the request of the Jedi Council. But shortly before completing the training of their apprentices, the Masters were troubled by dark visions of a returning Sith Lord, clad in a red space suit, wreaking havoc all over the galaxy and destroying the Jedi order. Assuming that their visions indicated that one of their Padawans (who used red spacesuits during their last test) was to become the new Sith Lord, the Masters decided to take desperate measures: murdering their learners during their knighting ceremony. Unfortunately for them, Zayne Carrick managed to escape, setting in motion a series of events that would have enormous consequences for the galaxy.

== Story Arcs ==
- Star Wars: Knights of the Old Republic – Crossroads (#0)
- Star Wars: Knights of the Old Republic – Commencement (#1–6) is the first story arc in the comic book series. The arc consists of six issues; the first issue was released on January 25, 2006, while the last was released on June 28, 2006.
- Star Wars: Knights of the Old Republic – Flashpoint (#7–8,10) is the second story arc in the comic book series.
  - Flashpoint Interlude: Homecoming (#9)
- Star Wars: Knights of the Old Republic – Reunion (#11–12) is the third story arc in the comic book series. The arc consists of two issues, the first issue released on December 27, 2006, and the second released on January 10, 2007.
  - Star Wars: Knights of the Old Republic – Crossroads is a comic flip-book included in the Star Wars: Knights of the Old Republic/Rebellion 25¢ flip-book, released on March 1, 2006.
- Star Wars: Knights of the Old Republic – Days of Fear (#13–15) is a fourth story arc.
- Star Wars: Knights of the Old Republic – Nights of Anger (#16–18) is a fifth story arc.
- Star Wars: Knights of the Old Republic – Daze of Hate (#19–21) is a sixth story arc.
- Star Wars: Knights of the Old Republic – Knights of Suffering (#22–24) is a seventh story arc.
- Star Wars: Knights of the Old Republic – Vector (#25–28) is an eighth story arc in KotOR comic book series and first story arc in standalone crossover storyline Star Wars: Vector. The storyline proceeded from Knights of the Old Republic, to Star Wars: Dark Times, then to Star Wars: Rebellion, and finally to Star Wars: Legacy.
- Star Wars: Knights of the Old Republic – Exalted (#29–30) is a ninth story arc.
- Star Wars: Knights of the Old Republic – Turnabout (#31) is a tenth story arc.
- Star Wars: Knights of the Old Republic – Vindication (#32–35) is an eleventh story arc.
- Star Wars: Knights of the Old Republic – Prophet Motive (#36–37) is a twelfth story arc.
- Star Wars: Knights of the Old Republic – Faithful Execution (#38) is a thirteenth story arc.
- Star Wars: Knights of the Old Republic – Dueling Ambitions (#39–41) is a fourteenth story arc.
- Star Wars: Knights of the Old Republic – Masks (#42) is a fifteenth story arc.
- Star Wars: Knights of the Old Republic – The Reaping (#43–44) is a sixteenth story arc.
- Star Wars: Knights of the Old Republic – Destroyer (#45–46) is a seventeenth story arc.
- Star Wars: Knights of the Old Republic – Demon (#47–50) is an eighteenth and final story arc.
- Star Wars: Knights of the Old Republic – War (#1–5) is a standalone miniseries story arc, set after Demon.

== Trade paperbacks ==
Volume	Title	Material Collected
1	Commencement	Knights of the Old Republic #0–6
2	Flashpoint	Knights of the Old Republic #7–12
3	Days of Fear, Nights of Anger	Knights of the Old Republic #13–18
4	Daze of Hate, Knights of Suffering	Knights of the Old Republic #19–24
5	Vector: Volume 1	Knights of the Old Republic #25–28 / Dark Times #11–12
6	Vindication	Knights of the Old Republic #29–35
7	Dueling Ambitions	Knights of the Old Republic #36–41
8	Destroyer	Knights of the Old Republic #42–46
9	Demon	Knights of the Old Republic #47–50
10	War	Knight of the Old Republic: War #1–5
