= Star Wars: Dark Times =

Comic book series following Republic

Dark Times
- Art by Douglas Wheatley

Publication information
- Publisher: Dark Horse Comics
- Format: Comic book
- Publication date: 2006–2013
- No. of issues: 33 (32 + a 'zero issue')
- Main character(s): Dass Jennir, Bomo Greenbark, Captain Schurk-Heren, and more

Creative team
- Created by: Mick Harrison (writer), Welles Hartley (story)

Dark Times is a 2006, 33-issue (32 + a 'zero issue') comic book mini-series published by Dark Horse Comics. It was part of their 2006 relaunch of their Star Wars comics line, replacing Republic.

The first issue was released on November 8, 2006, and is written by Randy Stradley (as Mick Harrison) from a plot by Stradley (as Welles Hartley).

The series is set in the Star Wars galaxy shortly after the events in Episode III: Revenge of the Sith, and about 19 years before Episode IV: A New Hope. The story begins in the days following the events in Purge by John Ostrander.

== Creation ==
- Story: Welles Hartley
- Script: Mick Harrison
- Art: Doug Wheatley, Dave Ross, Lui Antonio
- Color: Ronda Pattison, Alex Wald, Dave McCaig
- Letter: Michael David Thomas, Michael Heisler
- Cover Art: Doug Wheatley, Zack Howard, Brad Anderson, Travis Charest

== Main characters ==
- Dass Jennir: Human Male, Jedi, Escaped the Jedi Purge
- Bomo Greenbark: Nosaurian, Fought for the Separatist movement. Rescued Jennir after the purge. Many of his clan were killed by the Empire's clone army; the survivors were sold into slavery, including his mate and daughter.
- Captain Schurk-Heren: Yarkora. Captain of the Uhumele.
- Mezgraf: Togorian. Crew member. A former slave, he still bears the mark on his shoulder, but often covers it.
- Ko Vakier: A swordsman with a distinguished sense of honor. He comes from a race known only as the Blood Carvers.
- Janks: Phindian. The crew's chief engineer.
- Meekerdin-maa, aka. "Ratty": Tintinnan. The crew's technician.
- Crys Taanzer: Human Female. The crew's pilot
- Kennan Taanzer: Human Male Jedi Padawan, Son of Crys. Stranded on a remote moon with Master K'kruhk and several other younglings.
- Master K'kruhk: One of the jedi who escaped the purge. He is stranded on a remote moon somewhere near Kessel. He is the master of Kennan Taanzer.
- Lynaliskar K'ra Snyffulnimatta aka. "Sniffles": Elomin. The crew's navigator.
- Mesa Greenbark: Bomo's mate.
- Resa Greenbark: Bomo's daughter.
- Uhumele: the central ship in the series. A medium-sized freighter, with enough firepower to combat a small squadron of fighter craft. Possibly a pirate ship, but more likely a smuggling vessel.
- Darth Vader: Human Sith Lord. The former Anakin Skywalker, reeling from the injuries he suffered during Star Wars: Episode III – Revenge of the Sith and haunted by his past, wonders about his place in the newly declared Empire.
- Palpatine/Darth Sidious: Human Sith Lord. The new Emperor of the galaxy works to destroy the last vestiges of the Separatists, and tries to keep his new apprentice from succumbing to self-pity.
- Dezeno Qua: A wealthy male human who enjoys eating foreign species. He ate Resa Greenbark.
- Orso Meeto: A well-known slave trader on the slave planet Orvax IV. He sold Resa Greenbark to Dezeno Qua.

== Story arcs ==
=== The Path to Nowhere ===
Issues 1–5 (November 2006–October 2007) follow the events of the Republic arc Into the Unknown and take place during Dark Lord: The Rise of Darth Vader. Exiled Jedi master Dass Jennir and his friend Bomo Greenbark are the only survivors of the Galactic Empire's war on the latter's home planet. The duo sneaks onto a docked ship, and after being caught by Crys Taanzer, convinces its crew to help them escape; to avoid mandatory Imperial inspections, Jennir hatches a plan to force all the docked ships to depart at once. To find out what happened to Greenbark's family, they go to the planet where most of the Empire's captives are being taken, and find members of Greenbark's species imprisoned in pits; they learn that his wife was killed defending his daughter. Jennir infiltrates a slaver's quarters and forces him to reveal the location of Greenbark's daughter, Resa, before killing him. Jennir and his then companions travel to the mansion of the man who bought Resa, but are horrified to learn that he ate her. Jennir kills the man in order to spare Bomo the guilt, but only provokes him to angrily reveal to the entire group that Jennir is a Jedi; the group decides to depart company with the latter.

Meanwhile, Darth Vader continues to learn to submit to his new master, Emperor Palpatine, even as he must reckon with his own childhood as a slave if he is to accept the Empire's allowance of such practices.

=== Parallels ===
Issues 6–10 (October 2007–February 2008) follow Jedi Master K'Kruhk, who survived the events of Order 66 and took several younglings under his protection, as well as Bomo and his companions as they flee the Empire. One of his crew, Janks, is captured by stormtroopers. The ship's captain reveals to Bomo that he has secured a buyer for some secret cargo. Crys consoles Bomo by telling him about the loss of her own family during the Clone Wars; her husband was killed by Separatist forces, and she agreed to let a Jedi take her son, Kennan, to train him as a Padawan. In the present, K'Kruhk trains Kennan on a fertile moon. Meanwhile, Bomo and company arrive on Mimban to make the exchange, but are double-crossed by the buyer, Haka, who is, in turn, double-crossed by his man, Lumbra. Captain Heren reveals to Haka that he had expected the betrayal and that Lumbra had loaded a booby-trapped crate onto his own ship. Haka then tortures Heren for the location of the real merchandise as he forces Crys to work as a slave. Lumbra crash-lands near K'Kruhk's settlement and goes to check it out. K'Kruhk sends the younglings into hiding, as Lumbra salvages their ship to repair his own. Jedi Master Chase Piru uses the Force to defend the younglings, revealing to Lumbra that he might have something more valuable than the crate he was originally trying to steal. Meanwhile, Bomo and Crys fight back against their guards. K'Kruhk and Piru split up to attack the pirates from opposing angles, even as Bomo's friends continue to liberate each other.

=== Vector ===
Issues 11 and 12 are the fifth and sixth parts of the 12-issue multi-series crossover arc Vector, which spans across Knights of the Old Republic, Dark Times, Rebellion, and Legacy. Darth Vader interrogates Janks, while Heren tells Bomo about the contents of the mystery crate. About 1,400 years ago, it was found under a kilometer of ice, and after it was left behind in the spoils of battle, Heren and his crew found it. A new buyer, a scholar named Peturri whom Heren trusts, has placed an offer on it, but it turns out to be a trap set by Vader. Heren's crew is chained to pillars, and Vader opens the crate, revealing the ancient Jedi Celeste Morne. She attacks Vader upon learning he is Sith, despite his pleas to form an alliance with him. Peturri tries to escape, but Vader uses the Force to hold him as he transforms into a Rakghoul, before Vader slays him. Morne battles the stormtroopers as Heren frees himself and the others. They escape to the ship, but Crys succumbs to the Rakghoul plague, forcing Heren to shoot the monster. Vader escapes on his shuttle, leaving Morne on the planet below with the stormtroopers-turned-Rakghouls.

=== Blue Harvest ===
The title is a reference to the working title of Return of the Jedi. In the prologue issue (August 2009), originally released in two parts on MySpace in January and February 2009, Dass Jennir accepts a job to defend a town from a slaver gang, even as he defends himself from a rival mercenary.

=== Out of the Wilderness ===
Issues 18–22 (August 2011–April 2012) follow Dass Jennir, now traveling with Ember Chankeli, the mercenary he encountered in Blue Harvest. After their ship crash-lands on the desert planet Prine, Jennir and Ember endure scorching conditions and an attack by land pirates. They are pursued by multiple parties: Darth Vader, who has learned of Jennir's existence; a mysterious assassin named Falco Sang, who has been silencing potential informants one step ahead of Vader; and the crew of the Uhumele, who are searching for their former companion and who have a new ally in the Verpine Jedi Beyghor Sahdett. After Sang captures Ember to use as bait, Jennir uses his droid H2 as a decoy to spring the trap and defeats him. In the aftermath, Jennir is reunited with the Uhumele crew, and Ember joins them. Meanwhile, Vader captures Sang and begins to train him as a new tool for the Empire.

=== Fire Carrier ===
Issues 23–27 (February–June 2013) return to Jedi Master K'Kruhk, who has crash-landed on the Imperial-controlled planet Arkinnea with the group of young Padawans he has been protecting since Order 66. Seeking sanctuary, they enter a massive refugee camp filled with civilians displaced by the Clone Wars, where they must conceal their identities from both Imperial forces and the resentful Arkinnea Militia overseeing the camp. They are joined by the blind Jedi Master Zao, who has been led to them by the Force, and the group escapes the camp into the countryside. They soon discover the militia's true purpose: massacring refugees by dropping them from an ore carrier onto a remote mountainside. K'Kruhk destroys the ore carrier using the Force, drawing the attention of both the militia and the sympathetic Imperial Commander Teron, who had already suspected foul play at the camp. With the help of the native Yunu, who remember the Jedi from ancient times, and Teron's intervention against the militia, K'Kruhk and the younglings eventually establish a safe haven on Arkinnea. Meanwhile, on Coruscant, Darth Vader trains the captured assassin Falco Sang.

=== A Spark Remains ===
Issues 28–32 (July–December 2013), the series finale, find Dass Jennir reunited with the Uhumele crew and in a relationship with Ember Chankeli. Beyghor Sahdett, the Verpine Jedi who joined the crew during Out of the Wilderness, proposes a plan to assassinate Darth Vader. The crew travels to a casino called The Lucky Twi'lek on Kestavel, where they recruit former Jedi Master Kai Hudorra, last seen in the earlier Republic series. Hudorra unmasks Sahdett as a secret agent of the Emperor; before he can be subdued, Sahdett alerts Vader to their location, and is killed in the ensuing duel. Vader arrives at Kestavel, and the Uhumele crew springs a fuel-ignition trap on him at the casino's entrance. Vader survives, and Hudorra ultimately sacrifices himself so that Jennir, Ember, and the rest of the surviving crew can escape to continue their resistance against the Empire.

== Issues ==
- Dark Times #1: The Path to Nowhere, Part 1 of 5 (Color 32 Pages, Nov 2006) $2.99
- Dark Times #2: The Path to Nowhere, Part 2 of 5 (Color 32 Pages, Jan 2007) $2.99
- Dark Times #3: The Path to Nowhere, Part 3 of 5 (Color 32 Pages, May 2007) $2.99
- Dark Times #4: The Path to Nowhere, Part 4 of 5 (Color 32 Pages, Jul 2007) $2.99
- Dark Times #5: The Path to Nowhere, Part 5 of 5 (Color 32 Pages, Oct 2007) $2.99
- Dark Times #6: Parallels, Part 1 of 5 (Color 40 Pages, Oct 2007) $2.99
- Dark Times #7: Parallels, Part 2 of 5 (Color 40 Pages, Dec 2007) $2.99
- Dark Times #8: Parallels, Part 3 of 5 (Color 40 pages, Jan 2008) $2.99
- Dark Times #9: Parallels, Part 4 of 5 (Color 40 pages, Feb 2008) $2.99
- Dark Times #10: Parallels, Part 5 of 5 (Color 40 pages, Apr 2008) $2.99
- Dark Times #11: Vector, Part 5 of 12 (Color 40 pages, May 2008) $2.99
- Dark Times #12: Vector, Part 6 of 12 (Color 40 pages, Jun 2008) $2.99
- Dark Times #0: Blue Harvest, Prologue (Color 40 pages, Aug 2009) $2.99
- Dark Times #13: Blue Harvest, Part 1 of 5 (Color 40 pages, Apr 2009) $2.99
- Dark Times #14: Blue Harvest, Part 2 of 5 (Color 40 pages, Aug 2009) $2.99
- Dark Times #15: Blue Harvest, Part 3 of 5 (Color 40 pages, Jan 2010) $2.99
- Dark Times #16: Blue Harvest, Part 4 of 5 (Color 40 pages, Apr 2010) $2.99
- Dark Times #17: Blue Harvest, Part 5 of 5 (Color 40 pages, Jun 2010) $2.99
- Dark Times #18: Out of the Wilderness, Part 1 of 5 (Color 40 Pages, Aug 2011) $2.99
- Dark Times #19: Out of the Wilderness, Part 2 of 5 (Color 32 Pages, Sep 2011) $2.99
- Dark Times #20: Out of the Wilderness, Part 3 of 5 (Color 32 Pages, Nov 2011) $2.99
- Dark Times #21: Out of the Wilderness, Part 4 of 5 (Color 32 Pages, Feb 2012) $2.99
- Dark Times #22: Out of the Wilderness, Part 5 of 5 (Color 32 Pages, Apr 2012) $3.50
- Dark Times #23: Fire Carrier, Part 1 of 5 (Color 32 Pages, Feb 2013) $2.99
- Dark Times #24: Fire Carrier, Part 2 of 5 (Color 32 Pages, Mar 2013) $2.99
- Dark Times #25: Fire Carrier, Part 3 of 5 (Color 32 Pages, Apr 2013) $2.99
- Dark Times #26: Fire Carrier, Part 4 of 5 (Color 32 Pages, May 2013) $2.99
- Dark Times #27: Fire Carrier, Part 5 of 5 (Color 32 Pages, Jun 2013) $2.99
- Dark Times #28: A Spark Remains, Part 1 of 5 (Color 32 Pages, Jul 2013) $3.50
- Dark Times #29: A Spark Remains, Part 2 of 5 (Color 32 Pages, Aug 2013) $3.50
- Dark Times #30: A Spark Remains, Part 3 of 5 (Color 32 Pages, Sep 2013) $3.50
- Dark Times #31: A Spark Remains, Part 4 of 5 (Color 32 Pages, Oct 2013) $3.50
- Dark Times #32: A Spark Remains, Part 5 of 5 (Color 32 Pages, Nov 2013) $3.50

== Trade Paperbacks ==
- The Path to Nowhere ....(#s 1–5) - $17.95
- Parallels ......................(#s 6–10) - $17.95
- Vector .........................(#s 11-12 & KotOR 25–28) - $17.95
- Blue Harvest ................(#s 13-17 & #0) - $17.95
- Out of the Wilderness....(#s 18–22) - $17.99
- Fire Carrier ...................(#s 23–27) - $18.99
- A Spark Remains ...................(#s 28–32) - $19.99
- Omnibus: Dark Times Volume 1 (#s 0-12 & Republic #79-80) - $24.99

== Reviews ==
- Casus Belli (v4, Issue 13 - Jan/Feb 2015)
