= Star Wars (2013 comic book) =

Comic book series

Cover of the first issue, by Alex Ross

Star Wars is a Star Wars comic book series published by Dark Horse Comics between 2013 and 2014. The series was written by Brian Wood, and follows the main characters of the original Star Wars trilogy soon after the events of the original film. (Note: Later titled Star Wars: Episode IV – A New Hope) It ended after a 20-issue run, largely due to the Star Wars comics license being transferred to Marvel as part of Disney's acquisition of Lucasfilm.

== Overview ==
Writer Brian Wood stated on his approach to the series that "My plan is to pretend that nothing else exists other than 'A New Hope.' At least in the minds of the characters." The series debuted in January 2013. Alex Ross contributed covers to the first four issues.

The series was originally planned to span the time period of the original Star Wars trilogy. In January 2014, Lucasfilm, which had been owned by Disney since late 2012, announced that the Star Wars comics license would transfer to Marvel—a Disney subsidiary—in 2015. In April 2014, it was announced that all existing Star Wars spin-off works would be discarded from the continuity to clear the slate for the Star Wars sequel trilogy (2015–2019). The series ended with issue #20, which was released in August 2014.

== Plot ==
Princess Leia leads the Rebel Alliance's search for potential new bases, even as the evil Galactic Empire consistently pursues them, indicating that a spy might have infiltrated the Rebellion. Agent of the Empire Darth Vader is reprimanded by the Emperor by having to carry out the mundane task of overseeing the construction of the second Death Star. Vader secretly grapples with his knowledge of Luke Skywalker's identity. While still in the Rebellion's service, Han Solo and Chewbacca are stalked by bounty hunters Boba Fett and Bossk, incentivized by bounties from both Vader and Jabba the Hutt; Han and Chewie are stalked by the Empire as well.

Acting on Mon Mothma's orders, Leia leads a team of pilots on a covert mission to scout possible base locations. Luke and Wedge Antilles (Note: Wedge announces that he is considering the name "Rogue Squadron" as both the successor to Red Squadron and the current Stealth Squadron.) infiltrate the Star Destroyer Devastator, hoping to learn the identity of a potential Rebel spy by snooping on the commanding Imperial officer. The officer follows the Rebel pilots back to their ship, and is revealed to be a Rebel spy himself—as well as Mon Mothma's nephew.

Leia suddenly reveals that she has long planned to marry a prince in exchange for using his planet as a Rebel base. The wedding is sabotaged by Imperials, with whom some of the planet's royalists have forged an alliance. Mon Mothma orders the Rebellion's ion cannons, which have been recently installed on the planet, to be used to break the Imperial blockade.

=== Story arcs ===
- In the Shadow of Yavin (Issues #1–6)
- From the Ruins of Alderaan (Issues #7–12)
- Five Days of Sith (Issues #13–14)
- Rebel Girl (Issues #15–18)
- A Shattered Hope (Issues #19–20)

== Reception ==
The first issue sold 39,663 issues in its first month of release, ranking #53 on the sales chart; this was considered a meager debut by IGN. Writing for IGN, Joey Esposito reviewed the first issue positively, but mentioned that it is "sometimes weighed down in exposition and technical jargon" and that "actor likenesses" were not captured perfectly. IGN's Jesse Schedeen gave issue #6 a more mixed review, saying the space battles "have grown a bit tedious by this point" and calling the love triangle between Luke, Leia, and another female pilot "somewhat forced". The same writer criticized the premise of #15 as being too similar to the plot of the 1994 novel The Courtship of Princess Leia, calling Luke's brooding over Leia "icky", and describing the visuals as too strongly resembling medieval fantasy. Schedeen wrote that the arc had "picked up steam" with its final issue, #18, and said of the series finale (#20), "It's clear from these pages that Wood could have told many more stories were the Star Wars license not shifting back to Marvel."

== Collections ==
Dark Horse Comics collected the series into four trade paperbacks. (Note: The first volume also contains a Free Comic Book Day one-shot issue from 2013, which focuses on Darth Vader and Boba Fett.) The fourth story arc, Rebel Girl, was collected as the third trade paperback, while the third and fifth arc, each two issues long, were collected in the fourth.

The entire series was also collected in the first two volumes of Marvel Epic Collection: Star Wars – Legends: The Rebellion, published by Marvel in 2016 and 2017, respectively.
