= Star Wars: Shattered Empire =

- Issue #1 cover (September 2015)

Publication information
- Publisher: Marvel Comics
- Format: Limited series
- Genre: Science fiction
- Publication date: September – October 2015
- No. of issues: 4

Creative team
- Written by: Greg Rucka
- Artist: Marco Checchetto
- Letterer: Joe Caramagna

Star Wars: Shattered Empire is a four-issue Star Wars comic book limited series, set immediately after the events of the 1983 film Return of the Jedi. It features the parents of Resistance X-wing fighter pilot Poe Dameron from the 2015 film Star Wars: The Force Awakens, who are members of the Rebel Alliance. Poe's mother is Shara Bey, an A-wing pilot who adventures with Leia Organa, and his father is Kes Dameron, part of a special ground force known as the Pathfinders who are led by Han Solo. The story involves their adventures alongside Luke Skywalker, Leia Organa, Han Solo, Chewbacca, Lando Calrissian, and others in the aftermath of the Battle of Endor as the Empire attempts to avoid total defeat. Written by Greg Rucka and illustrated by Marco Checchetto, the series was published by Marvel Comics between September 9 and October 21, 2015.

== Plot ==
A-wing pilot Shara Bey and her special forces husband Kes Dameron find themselves in the middle of the Rebel Alliance's struggle to keep the floundering Empire at bay following the Battle of Endor.

== Publication ==
In March 2015, Lucasfilm announced "Journey to Star Wars: The Force Awakens", a publishing initiative consisting of "at least" 20 novels and comic books from multiple publishers intended to connect the previous films with The Force Awakens and its forthcoming sequels. Shattered Empire was announced in August 2015, to be written by Rucka with art by Checchetto. Set immediately after Return of the Jedi, the comic focuses on A-wing pilot Shara Bey but features classic characters Luke, Leia, Han, Chewbacca, and Lando in supporting roles. Shara and her husband, Kes Dameron, are the parents of Resistance pilot Poe Dameron, introduced in the 2015 film The Force Awakens. In creating the story, Rucka collaborated with Rayne Roberts, Kiri Hart, Pablo Hidalgo, and Leland Chee of the Lucasfilm Story Group. The four-part limited series was published by Marvel Comics between September 9 and October 21, 2015.

== Reception ==
Joshua Yehl of IGN praised Rucka's "honest and charming dialogue" and called Checchetto's artwork "rather spectacular", noting that "Shattered Empire delivers a more steady and hard-edged story than any of Marvel’s other Star Wars comics." Sean Keane of New York Daily News wrote that Rucka "does an amazing job of highlighting the intimate moments in a big storyline". He added that "Checchetto proves adept at depicting both large battles and more intimate moments, with an expressive style. The new characters, both human and non-human, are well-designed and visually distinctive."

== Legacy ==
The series introduced Operation Cinder, a contingency attack carried out by the Empire against its own worlds in the event of Emperor Palpatine's death, including his home world of Naboo (as depicted in the series). The operation was later depicted in the novel Aftermath: Empire's End (2017) and the video game Star Wars: Battlefront II (2017), as well being referenced in a season two episode of The Mandalorian (2020).
