= The Han Solo Adventures =

Series of Star Wars novels

- Cover of The Han Solo Adventures 1992 omnibus
- Han Solo at Stars' End (1979); Han Solo's Revenge (1979); Han Solo and the Lost Legacy (1980)
- Author: Brian Daley
- Country: United States
- Language: English
- Genre: Science fiction
- Publisher: Del Rey Books
- Published: 1979–1980
- Media type: Print

The Han Solo Adventures is a trilogy of science fiction novels set in the Star Wars fictional universe written by American novelist Brian Daley and published by Del Rey in 1979 and 1980. It follows the smuggling days of Han Solo and Chewbacca two years before the events of the original Star Wars film.

The books were the first Star Wars novels released besides Alan Dean Foster's novelization of the original film and Splinter of the Mind's Eye (1978). The events of the series were incorporated into the Star Wars Expanded Universe by being contextualized in interludes in Rebel Dawn (1998), the final book of Ann C. Crispin's Han Solo Trilogy.

== Works ==
=== Han Solo at Stars' End ===
Han Solo at Stars' End
- Author: Brian Daley
- Cover artist: Wayne Douglas Barlowe
- Publication date: September 12, 1979
- ISBN: 0-345-28355-4

Han Solo at Stars' End is the first book of the trilogy. It was published in 1979. In UK editions of the novel, the character name Bollux was changed to Zollux, as the original name sounds like the word bollocks, which is regarded as profanity in the UK, meaning "testicles" or more colloquially, nonsense or something low quality.

Discovering that they need a special waiver in order to operate the Millennium Falcon within the Corporate Sector without running afoul of the authorities, Han Solo and Chewbacca attempt to get in touch with Doc, an outlaw technician. However, Doc's daughter Jessa informs them that her father has vanished, presumably abducted.

Han works out a deal with Jessa: in exchange for the waiver and upgrades to the Falcon, he and Chewbacca will help out in the effort to discover what happened to Doc and other enemies of the Corporate Sector Authority, a capitalistic and authoritarian organization. As part of this effort, Han and Chewbacca escort the droid Bollux to the agricultural planet of Orron III, where they meet with Rekkon, the leader of the missing persons search. Blue Max, a small computer probe hidden away in Bollux's chest cavity, is able to infiltrate the Authority's computer network and begin searching for the location of the abductees. However, Rekkon's small group has been compromised by a traitor, and their activities are discovered. During the group's attempt to escape the planet, Chewbacca is captured by the Authority.

Han and the others manage to escape the planet aboard the Falcon. During liftoff, the traitor shoots Rekkon and destroys the data that Blue Max gathered. Before dying, Rekkon is able to leave the words "Stars' End, Mytus VII" scrawled on the Falcon's game table. Han realizes that this must be the location of the Authority's prison facility. Han uses this information in a canary trap to reveal the traitor, and jettisons him into hyperspace. Han and the remaining members of Rekkon's group fly to Stars' End. Masquerading as interstellar entertainers, they infiltrate the facility and rescue their friends, including Doc and Chewbacca. The facility is destroyed, along with the administrator and most of the staff, in the escape.

==== Comic adaptation ====
From October 1980 to February 1981, writer Archie Goodwin and artist Alfredo Alcala adapted the novel in the Star Wars newspaper comic strip. The Corporate Sector was explained to be a division of the Galactic Empire, with its ships depicted as such. In 1997, Dark Horse Comics published the comic as the colorized three-issue Classic Star Wars: Han Solo at Stars' End, collecting it as a trade paperback the same year.

=== Han Solo's Revenge ===
Han Solo's Revenge
- Author: Brian Daley
- Cover artist: Dean Ellis
- Publication date: 1979
- Pages: 198
- ISBN: 0-345-28475-5

Han Solo's Revenge is the second book in the trilogy. It was originally published in 1979. It mentions an ex-smuggler character named Roa who first took Han on the Kessel Run.

Down on their luck after a botched enterprise, Han and Chewbacca resort to a smuggling offer from an anonymous employer. They discover that the cargo they are expected to ship is a group of slaves—a practice Han has no tolerance for. After thwarting the slavers' attempt to take the Falcon with the help of Bollux and Blue Max, Han and Chewbacca head for the planet Bonadan, where the slavers' leader was expected to provide payment. Instead of the contact, they cross paths with Fiolla, an auditor with the Corporate Sector Authority. She convinces Han that his only chance of getting paid is to help her track down the slavers. Meanwhile, an Authority official provisionally claims the Falcon until Han can pay off a debt.

The slavers monitor Fiolla, Han, and Chewbacca, causing them to split up. Han sticks with Fiolla and instructs Chewbacca to meet him on a planet to investigate the slavers' connection to one of its governing clans. Chewbacca takes the Falcon, while Han and Fiolla board a cruise liner. Han and Fiolla arrive and uncover the evidence Fiolla needs to implicate high-ranking Authority officials in the slaving ring. Outwitting the Authority forces who have been sent by Fiolla's superior to detain them, Han and Chewbacca are finally able to collect their payment and depart the planet.

=== Han Solo and the Lost Legacy ===
Han Solo and the Lost Legacy
- Author: Brian Daley
- Cover artist: William Schmidt
- Publication date: August 1980
- Pages: 187
- ISBN: 0-345-34514-2

Han Solo and the Lost Legacy is the third novel in the trilogy, published in August 1980. Unlike the first two books, which introduced and fleshed out the Corporate Sector, this adventure takes place in the Tion Hegemony. An explanation for Han's chin scar is given, and Gallandro, a gunslinger of uncertain allegiances, returns from the previous book.

While taking a well-earned break, Han and Chewbacca are approached by Badure, an old friend, and his female companion Hasti. Badure has a lead on the fabled Queen of Ranroon, the treasure ship of the ancient Xim the Despot, which has long been presumed lost. Though Han is initially reluctant to join, he and Chewbacca decide to accompany Badure on his treasure hunt. Accompanying them on their quest are Bollux, Blue Max, and Skynx, an alien historian.

Han's group is not the only one on the trail of the treasure. On the planet, Han and his companions are attacked and forced to abandon the Falcon. Their attackers steal the Falcon and fly her to a distant mining camp, where they intend to tear her apart if necessary to find clues about the Queen's location. Han's group travels overland to recover his ship. On the way, they are captured by a group of religious cultists, descendants of the Queen of Ranroon's crew. The cultists are determined to defend Xim's treasure and are about to unleash an army of his ancient war robots to destroy the mining camp and the Falcon.

Bollux and Blue Max manage to manipulate and stop the war robots. Han and the others recover the Falcon and fly to the location of the fabled treasure, only to find that it is primarily war materiel that was state-of-the-art in Xim's era, but is now worth almost nothing. Skynx is excited to build a career as a historian of the preserved archives, and invites Badure, Hasti, Bollux and Blue Max to join him; they all accept. Han and Chewbacca take the Falcon back into space, with the pilot vowing to stick to smuggling, whether it means making another Kessel Run or approaching Jabba the Hutt.

== Legacy ==
The books were published by Del Rey in 1979 and 1980, making them the first Star Wars books released besides Alan Dean Foster's novelization of the original film and Splinter of the Mind's Eye (1978). Besides other film novelizations, they were also the last published until The Adventures of Lando Calrissian trilogy in 1983. An omnibus edition of The Han Solo Adventures was published in 1992.

Han Solo's Revenge introduced the swoop speeder, (Note: It also introduces swoop racing as being part of Han's backstory, which is explored in later works such as Tales of the Bounty Hunters (1996).) vibroblades, and the Victory-class destroyer to the franchise. Elements such as the Corporate Sector, the Tion Hegemony and the world of Etti IV were variously mentioned in other Star Wars spin-off works. The events of the series, as well as that of The Adventures of Lando Calrissian, were incorporated into the timeline of the Expanded Universe by being contextualized in interludes in the final book of Ann C. Crispin's The Han Solo Trilogy, Rebel Dawn (1998), which takes place about two years before the events of the original Star Wars film.

After The Walt Disney Company purchased Lucasfilm, it was announced that Expanded Universe works would be rebranded as Legends and no longer considered part of the official canon. The Z-95 Headhunter, which was first mentioned in Han Solo at Stars' End, has been canonized as a predecessor to the X-wing fighter in works including Star Wars: The Clone Wars. The Tion Hegemony, Corporate Sector, Etti IV, Bonadan, were made canon in official reference material. Additionally, the skull featured on the cover of Han Solo and the Lost Legacy was included as an easter egg in the 2018 film Solo: A Star Wars Story.
