= Dejarik =

Fictional board game

Dejarik, also known as holographic chess or holochess, is a primarily-fictional board game appearing in the Star Wars space opera franchise that uses holographic figures as pieces. The game has been roughly described as that universe's equivalent of terrestrial chess (Note: In the sense that a chess variant is understood as a game "related to, derived from, or inspired by chess".) since it is played on a board with a chequered pattern, each piece has a specific way of moving and attacking, and if it lands on a spot occupied by an opponent, it destroys the other piece. Over the years, several official and fan-made replicas have been made. As of 2021, no single, official rule set for the game has been released, and instead, a number of different rule sets (mostly designed by fans) for the game co-exist. Even the number of figures to be used in the game is unclear, although the best known variant uses eight.

The game debuted in the 1977 film Star Wars, in a scene on board the Millennium Falcon being played R2 and Chewbacca; it is implied that the latter won the game. It is notable as one of the classic, early examples of holograms, 3D and AR in fiction.

== Origins and history ==
Dejarik first appeared on screen in the 1977 space opera film Star Wars. In a scene lasting about 15 seconds, while traveling from Tatooine to Alderaan aboard Han Solo's light Corellian space freighter the Millennium Falcon, the Wookiee Chewbacca plays the game against the droid R2-D2. When R2 seems to be winning, Chewbacca rages, to which C-3PO comments on his useless anger. Han Solo then chimes in on how it is better not to displease Chewbacca, since Wookiees are famous for ripping their opponents' arms, at which point a scared 3PO changes his mind and suggests that R2 "let the Wookiee win". The dejarik board later appears when the starship is flying from the Death Star to Yavin IV, as Luke Skywalker sits in front of it, mourning Obi-Wan Kenobi's death at the hands of Darth Vader.

The movie prop representing the game used in the scene was designed and created by Phil Tippett and Jon Berg. The game later made appearances in a number of Star Wars media, including the television series Star Wars: The Clone Wars and Star Wars Rebels. In the 2015 film Star Wars: The Force Awakens, Finn briefly activates the Falcon's dejarik board, and in 2018's Solo: A Star Wars Story, Chewbacca and Tobias Beckett play the game aboard the Millennium Falcon.

== In the Star Wars Universe ==
Dejarik is a popular holographic game in the world of Star Wars, installed, for example, on the decks of starships in order to provide entertainment during long flights through hyperspace. A typical game station consists of a hologram generator, usually placed in the cylindrical base of the set, on which there is a board made of three circles filled with alternating white and black fields. When launched, colorful, three-dimensional characters are generated. These characters are controlled by the player using a keyboard built into the table. Each piece has its own specific abilities that can be used during the game. When two characters take the same place on the board, they fight each other.

The 1977 scene was originally designed to include ten figures, but the version shown in the film in 1977 has eight. (Note: The original eight pieces are named Ghhhk, Grimtaash the Molator, the Houjix, the Kintan strider, the K'lor'slug, the Mantellian Savrip, the Monnok, the Ng'ok; those names were first revealed in the Star Wars Customizable Card Game. The two pieces revealed in the 2018 movie are named the Bulbous and the Scrimp. A reference to an eleventh piece, named karkath, is made in the 2018 Star Wars novel, Last Shot.) This was because ten figures were originally designed in 1977, but George Lucas preferred the visually "less cluttered" version with eight. In Solo, a prequel to the 1977 Star Wars, Chewbacca damages the dejarik projector on the Millennium Falcon, providing an in-universe explanation as to why there are only eight figures on the screen. This implies that the full version of the game should have ten, not eight, figures.

== Rules ==
The detailed rules of the game were not described in the film or other official media, and due to a lack of an official, licensed release of the game, a number of fans have created their own ruleset variants over the years. More official rules were created in 2017, when the first licensed computer game implementing dejarik (Star Wars: Jedi Challenges) was created; in 2019, a licensed board game version known as Galaxy's Edge: Dejarik Board Game with Checkers was also released, but with different rules than the computer version from 2017. In 2020, it was announced that at some point, Lucasfilm developed gameplay rules for dejarik, but as of 2021, they were still not publicly released. All known rules so far (as of 2021) are for the version with eight figures.

== Significance ==
In addition to a number of licensed merchandise products, several Star Wars fans have created their own dejarik game replicas over the years. A theme-park replica of the game has been created in 2017 in Star Wars: Galaxy's Edge theme park.

Dejarik has been the subject of scientific research in the field of human–computer interaction and has been identified as one of the classic, early examples of holograms and AR (augmented reality) in fiction. Dejarik has also inspired a number of inventors to create physical devices that would imitate the holographic effects seen in the film, from older products such as the 1983 Archon computer game to more recent ones such as those designed by Voxiebox.

== See also ==
- 3D chess
- Sabacc
- Star Wars Chess
