= Sabac =

Sabac may mean:

- Šabac, a city in Serbia
  - FK Mačva Šabac, football club
- Sabac Red, an American rap artist
- Sabbac, a supervillain character in DC Comics
- Sabacc, a card game similar to poker within the Star Wars canon
