= Splinter of the Mind's Eye =

1978 novel by Alan Dean Foster

- First edition
- Author: Alan Dean Foster
- Cover artist: Ralph McQuarrie
- Language: English
- Series: Star Wars
- Genre: Science fiction
- Publisher: Del Rey Books
- Publication date: Hardcover: March 1978; Paperback: April 1, 1978
- Publication place: United States
- Media type: Print (hardcover & paperback)
- Pages: Hardcover: 216; Paperback: 199
- ISBN: 0-345-27566-7
- Preceded by: From the Adventures of Luke Skywalker (1976)
- Followed by: Star Wars Episode V: The Empire Strikes Back (1980)

Splinter of the Mind's Eye is a 1978 science fiction novel by American writer Alan Dean Foster, a sequel to the film Star Wars (1977). Originally published in 1978 by Del Rey, a division of Ballantine Books, the book was written with the intention of being adapted as a low-budget sequel to Star Wars in case the original film was not successful enough to finance a high-budget sequel.

Splinter of the Mind's Eye was the first Star Wars novel with an original storyline published after the release of the original film, and is thus considered, alongside the Star Wars newspaper comic strip and Marvel's 1977 comic series, to mark the beginning of the Star Wars Expanded Universe.

The story focuses on Luke Skywalker and Princess Leia, who are marooned together on the world of Mimban, where they encounter the locals and struggle against the forces of the evil Galactic Empire, including Darth Vader.

== Background and publication ==
In 1976, Alan Dean Foster was contracted to ghostwrite a novelization of Star Wars. Foster was given some drafts of the script, rough footage, and production paintings for use as source material in fleshing out the novel. His contract also required a second novel, to be used as a basis for a low-budget sequel to Star Wars in case the film was not successful. Though Foster was granted a great deal of leeway in developing the story, a key requirement was that many of the props from the previous production could be reused when shooting the new film. Foster's decision to place his story on a misty jungle planet was also intended to reduce set and background costs for a film adaptation. Han Solo and Chewbacca were left out, as Harrison Ford had not signed a contract to film any of the sequels at the time of the novel contract. (Note: While not featured in the book, Han Solo is alluded to by Luke as "a pirate and a smuggler" he knows.) Lucas's only request upon reviewing the manuscript was the removal of a space dogfight Luke and Leia undertake before crash-landing on the planet, which would have been effects heavy and expensive to film.

An additional sequel novel was planned, but by the time Splinter of the Mind's Eye was published, Star Wars had broken box office records. The film adaptation of Splinter of the Mind's Eye was abandoned in favor of Lucas's vision of a big-budget sequel (The Empire Strikes Back). Nevertheless, riding on the success of the film in its first year of release, the book became a bestseller. It was reprinted in 1994 as Classic Star Wars: Splinter of the Mind's Eye and retroactively placed two years after the original film, thus one year before The Empire Strikes Back.

== Plot ==
Luke Skywalker and Princess Leia are traveling with R2-D2 and C-3PO to the planet Circarpous IV to persuade its inhabitants to join the Rebel Alliance. A strange energy storm forces them to crash land on the swampy Circarpous V, known to the locals as Mimban. They begin looking for a space port to get off the planet but instead find a town, near which agents of the Empire have an energy mine—the cause of the crash. Forced to keep their identities secret, Luke and Leia take refuge in a nearby bar. An old woman named Halla approaches them, identifies Luke as strong with the Force, and shows him a splinter of what she claims to be the Kaiburr crystal, (Note: The Kaiburr concept originated in the early drafts of the original Star Wars film, where it featured as a MacGuffin the Jedi needed to retrieve from the Sith. It was also the antecedent of the kyber crystal which was canonized as the power crystal used in both lightsabers and the Death Star.) which focuses the Force. Halla strikes a deal with Luke and Leia to help her find the whole crystal, in return for which she will help them get off the planet. A squabble between Luke and Leia attracts the attention of miners emerging from the pub, who claim that fighting in public is against Imperial law; they all get into a brawl. Imperial stormtroopers intervene and incarcerate Luke and Leia. They are questioned by Imperial Captain-Supervisor Grammel, who confiscates the crystal shard and Luke's weapons. Luke and Leia are placed in a maximum-security cell with two drunk but friendly Yuzzem, hairy creatures called Hin and Kee. Grammel reports the incident and gives the crystal shard to the Imperial governor of the star system. Halla uses the Force to help Luke, Leia, and the two Yuzzem. The Yuzzem rampage through the jail while Luke and Leia escape.

The four meet Halla and the droids to find the Temple of Pomojema, which Halla believes is the location of the Kaiburr crystal. They travel through the swampy wilds of Mimban and encounter a wandrella, a huge wormlike creature, which pursues them and separates Luke and Leia from the others. Luke and Leia hide in a well, down which the wandrella falls, leaving the two trapped. From the lip of the well, Halla suggests that there must be an escape route underground, at the end of which Halla and the others will rejoin them. Luke and Leia journey underground, floating across a lake on lily pads, and fend off sea creatures. On the other side of the lake, they encounter the secretive residents of the caves, the Coway, who have captured Halla, the droids and the Yuzzem. To save his friends, Luke defeats the Coway's champion fighter, impressing the tribe. At a tribal banquet, Luke senses Darth Vader, confirmed by Coway patrols: Imperials, led by Vader and Grammel, are approaching.

When the Imperials arrive, they are surprised by the Coway tribe's resistance in battle. Vader and Grammel retreat with the handful of surviving stormtroopers, though Vader loses patience with Grammel for the defeat and kills him. Luke and company steal a recently abandoned Imperial transport and travel to the temple, where they find the Kaiburr crystal. They encounter a monster and unsuccessfully try to fight it off with blasters. Luke cuts down one of the pillars holding up the temple, crushing the monster, but his leg is pinned under a boulder. Vader then enters the temple, announcing that he killed Hin and Kee. Leia takes up Luke's lightsaber and begins fighting Vader, who gives her multiple superficial burns with his own saber. Hin, mortally wounded, appears and lifts the rock off of Luke before perishing. Luke then duels Vader, deflecting some Force-based attacks and eventually slicing off Vader's arm. Despite this, Vader seems about to win, but then falls into a pit. Luke senses that this is not the end of Vader. He and Leia, healed by the crystal, drive off with Halla into the mists of Mimban.

== Comic book adaptation ==
The book was adapted as a graphic novel by Terry Austin and Chris Sprouse and published by Dark Horse Comics in 1996; it incorporated characters from The Empire Strikes Back who did not appear in the original novel.

== Legacy ==
Splinter of the Mind's Eye was the first full-length Star Wars novel with an original storyline published after the release of the original film, and is thus considered, alongside the Star Wars newspaper comic strip and Marvel's 1977 comic series, to mark the beginning of the Star Wars Expanded Universe.

In 2008, the Los Angeles Times listed the novel as one of the most essential works of the Expanded Universe. Elements from the book, such as the planet Mimban, have appeared in various other Expanded Universe works. With The Walt Disney Company's 2012 acquisition of Lucasfilm, most of the licensed Star Wars novels and comics produced since the originating 1977 film were rebranded as Legends and declared non-canon in April 2014.

Concept art for Rogue One (2016) used Mimban as a name for the city that eventually developed into Jedha (another source of kyber), and a planet called Mimban featured in 2018's Solo: A Star Wars Story. Additionally, Marvel Comics' The Rise of Kylo Ren features Ben Solo traveling to Mimban, where he learns of the Mindsplinter—possibly the Kaiburr crystal by another name.

== See also ==
- Classic Star Wars, a collection of early Star Wars spin-off comics
- Star Wars: Heir to the Jedi, a canon novel set between the same films
- Star Wars: Shadows of the Empire, a Star Wars story also set between films of the original trilogy

== Sources ==
- Kaminski, Michael (2008) [2007]. The Secret History of Star Wars: The Art of Storytelling and the Making of a Modern Epic. Kingston, Ont.: Legacy Books Press. ISBN 978-0-9784652-3-0.
