= Star Wars (comic strip) =

Newspaper comic strip

- Cover of IDW Publishing's first volume

Publication information
- Format: Newspaper
- Genre: Science fiction Space opera

Creative team
- Written by: Russ Manning (1979); Steve Gerber (1979); Don R. Christensen (1980); Archie Goodwin (as Russ Helm) (1979–1980); Archie Goodwin (1980–1984)
- Artist(s): Russ Manning (1979–1980); Alfredo Alcala (1980–1981); Rick Hoberg (1980); Dave Stevens (1980); Al Williamson (1981–1984) assisting drawers: Alden McWilliams (1981–1982); Carlos Garzon (1981–1982); Brent Anderson (1983); Tom Yeates (1983)
- Editor: Dean Mullaney

A Star Wars comic strip ran in both daily strips and Sunday strips, originally distributed between 1979 and 1984 by two American newspaper publishers, the Los Angeles Times Syndicate and Watertown Daily Times.

The comics are set between the original Star Wars film and The Empire Strikes Back, with the exception of an adaptation of Brian Daley's Han Solo at Stars' End (1979). The first run, by Russ Manning, was primarily created before the release of The Empire Strikes Back, while Archie Goodwin and Al Williamson, in their storylines, worked with the benefit of having seen both films, in addition to Return of the Jedi in 1983.

In 1991, Russ Cochran published a 2500-copy limited run of a three-volume hardcover boxset of all of Goodwin and Williamson's Star Wars comic strips from between 1981 and 1984. From 1992 to 1994, Dark Horse Comics collected colorized compilations of the newspaper strip in its Classic Star Wars series. Between 2017 and 2018, The Library of American Comics and IDW Publishing published a three-volume reprint series of the complete comic strip.

== Overview ==
In 1978, writer Archie Goodwin and artist Al Williamson proposed an adaptation of the original Star Wars film as a daily newspaper comic strip, producing 12 black-and-white samples, (Note: These were published in the second volume of IDW Publishing's collection of the comic strip.) but the team ended up not being available to produce the full strip. (Note: Both would also work on Marvel Comics' self-titled Star Wars series.) By the next year, writer and artist Russ Manning (Note: Manning wrote and illustrated a six-panel sample comic to get the job. This features Luke Skywalker, R2-D2, and C-3PO returning to Tatooine to retrieve data from the escape pod the droids used in the original film, while Princess Leia has been kidnapped. The entire sample comic is included in 2017's Star Wars: The Classic Newspaper Comics: Vol. 1.) was hired to produce both a daily and Sunday strip spun off from the film. These originally told separate stories, which according to Manning were largely made up as he went along. After six months, he was replaced as writer, reportedly because newspapers wanted a story that was "more like a comic book". Subsequently, the daily and Sunday strips no longer told separate stories. Manning left the strip in mid-1980 due to his declining health; he died due to cancer the next year. A new artist, Alfredo Alcala, replaced him for a brief run, working with writer Archie Goodwin on an adaptation of Brian Daley's 1979 novel Han Solo at Stars' End. Goodwin would subsequently work on the strip with artist Al Williamson until 1984, when the series ended. According to Goodwin, he and Williamson decided to keep their strip set between the first two Star Wars films "Because of the cliffhanger elements in The Empire Strikes Back." The strip has 27 storylines in total.

The Sunday page also includes topper panels called Star Wars Scrapbook, featuring illustrations of various elements from the franchise; this ran from May 24 to December 27, 1981, and includes early versions of elements which did not make it into the films.

== Story arcs ==
=== Gambler's World ===
(Daily, March 12 – Sept 8, 1979)

Luke Skywalker, Princess Leia, C-3PO, and R2-D2 travel to a casino world, where they hope a Rebel Alliance contact will help them cut off the Galactic Empire's funneling of gambling profits. The heroes are stalked by Blackhole, a mysterious ally of Darth Vader. While Luke meets the Rebel contact, the droids run into trouble with local thieves, who eventually kidnap Leia and try to ransom her. Blackhole captures one of the thieves for information on the Rebels. Luke frees him, and becoming more sympathetic, the former gangster helps the Rebels escape as Blackhole attacks the den of thieves.

=== The Constancia Affair ===
(Sunday, March 11 – July 8, 1979)

C-3PO and R2-D2 are left stranded in space after a Star Destroyer destroys their ship. They are rescued by Han Solo and Chewbacca in the Millennium Falcon, while they were taking a girl named Gyla for a pleasure cruise. Avoiding an Imperial entanglement, they enter the ice ring of Constancia, the planet the droids were headed to. Most of the TIE fighters smash into chunks of ice, and the Falcon lands at a secret base, where Luke greets them. He has agreed to help protect the planet's inhabitants, who have been persecuted by the Empire because of their telepathic abilities. Han and another freedom fighter board a lifepod and allow themselves to be captured by a medium-sized Imperial fighter. They overtake its crew and help Luke and Chewie (aboard the Falcon) destroy the other fighters.

=== The Kashyyyk Depths ===
(Sunday, July 15 – Sept 9, 1979)

In a story set before the events of the previous tale, C-3PO and R2-D2 accompany Han and Chewie to Kashyyyk, the Wookiee home planet, to help prepare for Life Day. The holiday may be canceled when a Wookiee elder forbids the collecting of a root normally used to guide their spiritual journey to the Life Tree, because of particular dangers. Han breaks up a fight between Chewie and the elder, proposing that he, Chewbacca, and the droids personally go to the planet's lower levels to collect the root. Here, they encounter Imperial troops sawing through the sentient vegetation, accompanied by some scientists. The plants lash out against the humans, killing the Imperials and all but one scientist, Gyla. Chewbacca calms the plants down and collects the roots he needs, and the group returns to the celebratory village.

=== Tatooine Sojourn ===
(Sept 10 – Nov 5, 1979) (Note: Written by Steve Gerber, this is the first narrative in which both the Sunday and daily comics tell the same story.)

A lifepod containing squills, creatures carrying a deadly bacteria, lands on Tatooine and infects some Jawas. The Rebellion sends Luke to investigate, along with C-3PO and R2-D2. As he approaches the planet, he receives a transmission instructing him to go to the Mos Eisley cantina. There, a female humanoid named Anduvil saves him from one of Jabba the Hutt's henchmen. Anduvil tells Luke that other planets have been subject to similar biological attacks. Hiding in the former home of Obi-Wan Kenobi, the group is attacked by Tusken Raiders. The Sand People destroy their landspeeder before Luke can defeat them. They take their banthas to a sandcrawler, the occupants of which have been wiped out by the virus. Luke is bitten by a squill, and stormtroopers capture both him and Anduvil. The Imperials take a readout of Luke's eyes, which appear to reveal a star map. Anduvil vaporizes the stormtroopers and forces the scientist to give Luke the viral antidote. Meanwhile, the droids crash the sandcrawler through the gate of the Imperial base. Anduvil sabotages a TIE fighter engine to demolish the entire base as the small band of rebels escapes.

=== Princess Leia, Imperial Servant ===
(Nov 6 – Dec 31, 1979)

When Princess Leia's ship is about to be captured by Darth Vader's Star Destroyer, she is forced to use a small craft to escape to the planet below. The planet is the site of an Imperial mining colony overseen by Grand Moff Tarkin's widow. The colony slaves must wear special boots to prevent detonating the moss which explodes under pressure or above a certain temperature. Lady Tarkin soon spots Leia and forces her to work as a servant, especially because Imperial dignitaries will soon be visiting the colony for a diplomatic event. Leia overhears some workers discussing their stolen moss and plans to escape. She sends a message to their pilot accomplice using Tarkin's transmitter in exchange for letting her escape with them. The Imperial dignitaries arrive, including Lord Vader, but Leia manages to escape her duties. She and the thieves blow up their moss booty in order to defeat stormtroopers in pursuit. Their timely transport arrives in the form of Han, Chewbacca, and the Falcon.

=== The Second Kessel Run ===
(Jan 1 – Feb 25, 1980)

A scientist from Kessel has just finished building an ionic-powered ship capable of changing the weather, which he hopes to use to make less hospitable worlds paradises. Imperials soon arrive and capture the scientist and his daughter, Mira. They force the scientist to use his invention as a weapon against Rebel worlds, using his daughter as collateral. However, she escapes at a spaceport and stows away aboard the Millennium Falcon. Han and Chewie, who have some spice to deliver to Kessel for Jabba the Hutt, first stop at a small Rebel base to check in on Luke. The droids go aboard the Falcon and discover Mira, who presents her dilemma. She convinces Luke that if they can let her father know she is safe, he will stop using the device to destroy worlds. The group flies to a planet recently affected by unpredictably bad weather, and learn that Kessel is the Empire's next target. They race there, and Mira uses an untested image-transmitting device to contact her father. Han and Luke take the Falcon to the superweapon above, and are able to overpower stormtroopers to reach Mira's father. The scientist sets the weapon to self-destruct, and they escape in the Falcon.

=== Bring Me the Children ===
(Feb 26 – April 21, 1980)

While Luke is delivering some pre-Imperial literature to a school, the Empire kidnaps a class of kids, except for the teacher's son, Berd, who manages to escape. In space, Darth Vader instructs his officers to transmit a galaxy-wide message that he intends to kill the teacher—in order to lure Rebels. Luke, Leia, and Berd look for Han, hoping he can help. When they find him, he is in the middle of a bar fight. The participants of the brawl pay attention to Berd's plea and are slowly convinced to help. Berd presents his plan to use drones altered to look like bigger ships, drawing the Empire's forces while Han's cohorts sneak to the surface to liberate the prisoners. Luke, Han and Chewie make a surprise attack on a fleet of grounded TIE fighters. The executioners prepare to kill the hostages, but are stopped by Luke and Han. The two realize they are surrounded by stormtroopers, but the smuggler's buddies show up in time to save them.

=== As Long As We Live ===
(April 22 – June 16, 1980)

On an industrial world, Luke, and a couple of fighter pilots inform some local engineers that they have compromised the Alliance's weapons systems by letting a targeting component fall into the Empire's hands. Princess Leia is also on the planet to give a speech, hoping to turn up information about the compromised weapons. Hearing of this, the traitorous Mag Doum, who is responsible for selling the parts in question to the Empire, forces two of the engineers (a father and son) to kidnap the princess. Luke pursues, and is led by the father, Kiros, to his son, Zon, and Leia. Zon is attacked by a cave monster, and he leaves behind a fragment of blood-soaked clothing, leading Kiros to think he has perished. Luke, Han, and Chewie reconvene and pick up Leia, who is able to give her speech. She reveals Doum as being responsible for her kidnapping, prompting him to take flight. Doum contacts Vader with the location of the Rebels, and Luke arranges for a device to be used to affect both Rebel and Imperial targeting systems. The Rebels, aware of this, will know to compensate their aim. Luke leads a small group of X-wing pilots, including Zon, to defend themselves. Kiros, who has snuck aboard Doum's ship, takes power of the vessel and takes it for a suicide run against Vader's Star Destroyer. Zon flies alongside him, trying to convince him that the Rebels already have the upper hand, but is shot by a TIE fighter. Both father and son plunge into the Destroyer, forcing the Imperials to retreat.

=== The Frozen World of Ota ===
(June 17 – Aug 10, 1980)

Luke disables a TIE fighter above an ice planet and pursues it to the surface. Its pilot, a man in Mandalorian armor, opens fire on Luke. Elsewhere on the planet, R2-D2 provides Han, Chewie, and Leia with Luke's location. Luke and the mystery man are captured by natives, who ask for help restoring power to their city. The armored man overloads the generator so he and Luke can escape. Han finds Luke's footprints and follows them to a snow-snake which has recently attacked his friend. The natives capture Han and bring him to their city, where Han learns that they have seen Luke. The Mandalorian-armored man reveals himself to be bounty hunter Boba Fett, and he fights the natives in an attempt to capture Han. Luke and Han fight the bounty hunter, while Fett also fights the natives. The off-worlders notice a strange glow in part of the city, and Fett reasons that this is the location of his main bounty, a man called Mole that Vader wants captured. When Han and Fett arrive, they find that Mole has recently rescued Chewbacca from an avalanche. Mole uses a control panel to knock out his unwanted guests with gas. Leia rejoins her friends, and Mole enables a magnetic charge to pin Fett to a wall, using his armor against him.

=== Planet of Kadril ===
(Aug 11 – Oct 5, 1980)

The Rebels are working on a trade deal with a lizard-like species when Vader arrives, using a novel knock-out gas weapon against the creatures to force them to give up their natural rock, which protects against the gas. The natives wear cloaks doused with the rock's dust to protect themselves, and use a vibrating crystal to destroy the breathing filters of the Imperials.

=== Han Solo at Stars' End ===
(Oct 6, 1980 – Feb 8, 1981)

Some years before the events of the original Star Wars film, Han helps the daughter of the missing Doc, an outlaw technician, in exchange for repairs to the Falcon. Han and Chewie escort a droid named Bollux to an agricultural planet, where they meet other members of the outlaw group. Blue Max, a small droid lodged within Bollux's abdomen, hacks the location of the Empire-aligned Corporate Authority's prisoners. A traitor in the outlaw group causes Chewbacca's capture and kills the only person who Blue Max shared the prison location with before its erasure, but not before he scrawls this information out. Seeing this, Han uses a canary trap to reveal the traitor, then shoots him in self-defense. The Falcon flies to "Stars' End", where the group infiltrates the prison facility by pretending to be entertainers. Han and Blue Max go to a tech station to find Chewbacca and Doc. Han instructs the droid to set off charges within the station, which unexpectedly launches it high into the atmosphere with most of the group aboard, as well as their enemies. The remaining two members of the group arrive in the Falcon to rescue their friends.

=== The Bounty Hunter of Ord Mantell ===
(Feb 9 – April 19, 1981)

While the Rebel Alliance is still stationed on Yavin 4, Luke and Leia are scouting a planet as a potential new base. After an Imperial scout walker destroys their ship, Han and Chewbacca arrive in the Falcon just in time to save them. While evading Imperials escaping the planet, the Falcon has to perform a taxing maneuver, forcing them to land for repairs on Ord Mantell. There, Leia is captured by bounty hunter Skorr. Luke goes to help her, but is overpowered. Skorr's men use the Rebels as leverage to force Han to surrender himself. (Note: Han mentions encountering a bounty hunter on Ord Mantell in The Empire Strikes Back. Brian Daley also recounted an encounter between Han and a bounty hunter on the planet in his 1983 audio drama, Rebel Mission to Ord Mantell. The Star Wars Databank explains that Han "has had a history of close run-ins with bounty hunters" on the planet.) Han arrives in a skyhopper, plausibly to exchange himself for his friends, keeping the Falcon running to make it appear that Chewie will come save him. Chewie arrives, but in a cargo flyer, using its tractor beam to rescue the Rebel trio. Skorr uses a homing beacon to track the Rebels, but by the time they realize this, an Imperial fleet has closed in on them. The Rebels plant the homing beacon on an escape pod and send it towards the Imperials, leading Skorr to be captured, and the Falcon free to return to Yavin 4.

=== Darth Vader Strikes ===
(April 20 – July 26, 1981)

Luke, envious of Leia's apparent interest in Han, accepts a dangerous mission. Acting on a tip from an apparently sympathetic Imperial officer, he goes undercover as a droid mechanic on Darth Vader's new construction project, a Super Star Destroyer. The officer arranges for a group of treasonous Imperial saboteurs to meet Luke underground, where Vader plans to capture the traitors. With help from supply tug operator Tanith Shire, who immediately lusts after Luke, R2-D2 releases steam to cover his master's escape. Luke and the droids follow Tanith to a drone barge, which they use to escape Vader's grasp.

=== The Serpent Masters ===
(July 27 – Nov 1, 1981)

Tanith reveals that she has stolen several drone barges by sending them crashing to the planet they are headed for. On the surface, the flying-serpent-riding scavengers of the incoming cargo capture the droids and take Tanith and Luke to work in an underground mine, where Tanith's people have long been enslaved. Luke uses his lightsaber to climb to the level where the droids are about to be dismantled, and learns from them that the serpent masters use a high-pitched noise to control the beasts. R2-D2 is able to emit such a signal so Luke can ride one of the creatures and battle the supreme leader. This results in the defeat of the tyrants, and the liberated slaves are able to use the serpents to escape.

=== Deadly Reunion ===
(Nov 2, 1981 – Jan 1, 1982)

Luke, Tanith, and the droids take a short-range vessel to a nearby planet to rendezvous with Leia, who is due to be picked up in the Falcon. The Empire also arrives, forcing a mass evacuation. Tanith departs in her ship, while Luke stays to rejoin Leia. Han arrives, and a chase from TIE bombers leads the group to hide amid a mass of derelict ships, while R2-D2 repairs the hyperdrive. They soon learn that an Imperial scientist, doomed from radiation exposure after a Rebel attack on his facility, has been ensnaring others to join him in death. He has done this by initiating the collapse of a dwarf star, forming a powerful gravity well. Han and Luke manage to commandeer the bomb arsenal that the scientist used to create his trap. Using the blast to boost the Falcon into hyperdrive (and disintegrate the ship graveyard in the process), the Rebels manage to escape once again.

=== Traitor's Gambit ===
(Jan 2 – March 7, 1982)

Yavin 4 is under Imperial attack, so Leia recommends Han take them to a water world where she has a contact sympathetic to the Rebellion. Upon their arrival, Han voices his distrust in the contact, Silver Fyre, whom he knows to be a distrustful pirate. Fyre's second in command, Kraaken, overhears Han and Luke discussing secret Rebel intel stored in the droids. Fyre invites Han and Luke to an underwater hunt, during which Luke is stunned, leaving him prey to a sea monster; Han and Chewbacca swim to save him. They discover that Kraaken arranged the scenario so he could retrieve the data from the droids, but Leia catches him in the act.

=== The Night Beast ===
(March 8 – May 16, 1982)

The Rebels return to Yavin with Fyre's forces as reinforcements. A TIE bomber crash awakens a dormant monster in the Massassi ruins. Luke investigates its origin, discovering the temple's original inhabitants left the creature in a stasis chamber to protect their planet when they were forced to leave the galaxy during an ancient war. Luke suspects the creature may be Force-sensitive and eventually succeeds in calming it long enough to lead it onto a transport ship programmed to follow its masters across the stars.

=== The Return of Ben Kenobi ===
(May 17 – July 25, 1982)

Luke goes to investigate a Rebel weapons smuggler's report that Ben Kenobi is among the living. This turns out to be an imposter hired by Vader to lure Luke into a trap. However, the actor sympathizes with Luke and foils the dark lord's plot, allowing Skywalker to escape.

=== The Power Gem ===
(July 26 – Oct 3, 1982)

Han and Chewie investigate the possibility of retrieving an ancient power gem to penetrate the Executor's magnetic shields. One of them is required to take part in a gladiator-style battle to win the gem from its owner, Raskar. Han instructs Chewie to provoke an unscheduled fight with the champion on the training grounds, while he steals the gem. He reveals to his captors that he knows the gem is diminishing in power, convincing them to award it to Chewie in exchange for the duo's silence.

=== Iceworld ===
(Oct 4 – Nov 13, 1982)

Luke and C-3PO evade a group of TIE fighters by hiding their ship in the slipstream of a comet's tail, but are unable to pull free before crashing into an ice planet. A woman riding a tauntaun finds them. Her father, a former Imperial governor in hiding, thinks it best to eliminate any possible leaks as to their location, but Luke locks him up. Luke and the woman go to salvage the communicator from his ship, but the governor attacks them, fatally wounding his daughter. Luke kills the governor in self-defense and discovers that he is more machine than man. The dying girl reveals that they were only robotic replicants, constructed to allow their human counterparts to go into hiding—a plan which not account for the droids deciding to go into hiding as well.

=== Revenge of the Jedi ===
(Nov 14, 1982 – Jan 23, 1983)

Leia and Han pick up Luke on Hoth, which the Rebels agree would be a good place to hide from the Empire. Now that Vader's Super Star Destroyer, the Executor, is fully operational, they will need help from their new allies, the Mon Calamari, to relocate their base. They find wreckage at the rendezvous point, but deduce that Admiral Ackbar and his men took escape pods to a nearby boggy planet—where Imperials are also searching for them. Upon landing, the Falcon is dragged underwater by giant worms. Han and Luke meet the Imperial search party in battle, and when they return to the others, Ackbar positions the group at a strategic location on the far side of the lake. As the Imperial ships cross the murky waters, the worms abandon the Falcon for their new prey, allowing Mon Calamari divers to return Han's ship to the surface.

=== Doom Mission ===
(Jan 24 – April 17, 1983)

The Falcon jumps to a debris field which was recently the site of a battle between the Rebels and the Executor. Luke notices a Rebel scout ship jump to hyperspace. When they return to Yavin, General Dodonna's son, Vrad, returns in the ship Luke saw—allegedly after taking damage while battling the Executor. Luke suspects that Vrad avoided the battle and faked the damage to his ship. Luke and Vrad both volunteer to put the power gem to use against the Executor. After Luke confronts Vrad with his suspicions, Vrad abandons Luke on a small planet, stating his intent to flee the Rebellion. Sensing Luke through the Force, Vader approaches in the Executor. Han picks up Luke in the Falcon, having shared Luke's suspicions of Vrad. The general's son then attacks Vader's flagship, but is destroyed against its shields. This diversion allows the Falcon to temporarily cripple Vader's ship so the Rebels can evacuate Yavin.

=== Race for Survival ===
(April 18 – July 10, 1983)

Dodonna promotes Luke to commander, and stays behind on Yavin—sacrificing himself—while the Rebel fleet escapes. The Imperials surmise that the Rebels will escape through a weak point in their blockade, and set a trap for them. Luke scouts ahead, sees the waiting Imperials, and warns the others, but his X-wing is wrecked by TIE fighters. Han scouts an alternate path which seems hopeless because it passes through the stellar flares of an unstable star; he rescues Luke and they learn that Leia is leading the fleeting in their direction. Luke uses the Force to sense when the stellar flares are coming, but this allows Vader to sense his location. An ambitious admiral accidentally pilots three Star Destroyers directly into the Executor's shields, allowing the Rebel fleet to escape.

=== The Paradise Detour ===
(July 11 – Oct 2, 1983)

With its navigational systems damaged, the Falcon is forced to land on a nearby planet to make repairs. The surface of the planet is tropical, and Luke follows a woman who seems to be Tanith Shire. He rescues her from a monstrous plant before realizing that she is another woman altogether. He encounters more illusions and realizes that the woman is actually an ancient witch. Luke lets her drain her energy by making various attacks.

=== A New Beginning ===
(Oct 3 – Dec 25, 1983)

The Falcon's arrival on Hoth alerts a mysterious ship; Han and Luke are sent to investigate. The ship captures the Falcon in a tractor beam, and is revealed to be crewed by pirates led by Han's acquaintance Raskar, who hopes to collect Jabba the Hutt's bounty on Han. Luke suggests that Han pretend he still has the reward money from Leia, but Raskar believes he has it stored on Hoth. Han pilots them down in the Falcon and crash-lands in a ravine. Luke then says the treasure is hidden in a cavern, in which they discover lumni-spice, a naturally occurring treasure which Raskar thinks is the collateral they were looking for. A dragon-slug attacks them, but Luke is able to slay it with his lightsaber. Happy to have the valuable spice, Raskar helps Han get the Falcon out of the ravine.

=== Showdown ===
(Dec 26, 1983 – Feb 5, 1984)

Bounty hunters, including Dengar, (Note: Referred to as "Zuckass") Bossk, and Skorr, are waiting aboard Raskar's ship, all working for Boba Fett to collect Jabba's bounty on Han. The hunters take the pirates' ship, with the Falcon in its hold, to Ord Mantell to meet Fett. There, Vader meets with Fett, who suggests that he capture Han and use him to lure Luke to Vader. The bounty hunters let the pirates go, but lock them in their hold. Luke, Han, and Chewie break free, but find Skorr waiting to kill them in an act of revenge. Together, Luke and Han are able to defeat him. Raskar, an excellent lockpick, returns to create a diversion for his friends to escape.

=== The Final Trap ===
(Feb 6 – March 11, 1984)

While headed back to Hoth, Luke and Han learn that C-3PO and R2-D2 are in distress on another planet. The droids are attacked by a specialized Imperial probe droid. Vader uses a cybernetic Force-empowered device to attack Luke through the probe droid. Han blasts it, freeing Luke, and Vader orders more probes to continue the search for his Rebel prey.

== Collections ==
In 1991, Russ Cochran published a 2,500-copy limited run of a three-volume hardcover boxset of all of Goodwin and Williamson's Star Wars comic strips from 1981 to 1984, signed by both creators and featuring new cover illustrations by the latter. (Note: The first volume of the Russ Cochran collection notably features a traditional AT-ST walker on its cover, while the original comic and the later Dark Horse Comics trade paperback cover feature Williamson's rendering of concept art by Joe Johnston for The Empire Strikes Back.) An introduction by Goodwin is included.

Comics from this series were collected twice by Dark Horse Comics. The first collection was released between 1992 and 1994 with the title Classic Star Wars. It collected the later years of the strip done by Goodwin and Williamson, excluding the Sunday strips, and it colored the black-and-white daily strips and rearranged them to fit the comic book format. In 1994, Manning's strip was released as Classic Star Wars: The Early Adventures, including both daily and Sunday comics, with the exception of two storylines. One of the excluded storylines was later collected in a one-shot comic book, exclusive to Kay-Bee Toys. In 2017 and 2019, most of these were collected in two trade paperback volumes under the title Marvel Epic Collection: Star Wars – The Newspaper Strips. Marvel published an omnibus of both volumes in mid-2026.

In early 2017, a collection series by The Library of American Comics was announced. IDW Publishing President and COO Greg Goldstein stated that this collection would be the first fully complete version of the strip, including all strips in chronological order and with the title headers for all Sunday strips and bonus panels, material which usually had been discarded in the previous collections from other publishers. These were released in three volumes as Star Wars: The Complete Classic Newspaper Comics. (Note: The hardcover volumes measure 11 × 8.5 inches, (280 × 216 mm), landscape orientation, have sewn binding, and come with dust jackets and sewn ribbon bookmarks.) Each volume contains approximately 600 strips. The daily strips are reproduced in full original newspaper sizing, arranged three to a page; the full-page Sunday strips are arranged one per page with restored color. All the strips have annotated first publication dates. The collection presents the storylines in chronological order. All three volumes are prefaced by an essay by Rich Handley; the first volume also includes an essay about Russ Manning by Henry G. Franke III. The first volume was released in conjunction with the 40th anniversary of the original Star Wars film in May 2017, and the third entry was released in September 2018. That year, the first volume was nominated for an Eisner Award in the category "Best Archival Collection/Project—Strips". In 2019, the third volume won the Eisner Award in the same category. The book series is published under license and in cooperation with Marvel Comics and Lucasfilm. Each volume had the MSRP set at $49.99 at release.

Star Wars: The Complete Classic Newspaper Comics
Volume	Release date	Title	Period	Page count	ISBN
1	May 9, 2017	Star Wars: The Complete Classic Newspaper Comics – Vol. 1	1979–1980	260	978-1-63140-872-4
2	March 13, 2018	Star Wars: The Complete Classic Newspaper Comics – Vol. 2	1980–1982	295	978-1-68405-053-6
3	September 18, 2018	Star Wars: The Complete Classic Newspaper Comics – Vol. 3	1982–1984	272	978-1-68405-329-2

== Legacy ==
Williamson's depiction of an Imperial scout walker in The Bounty Hunter of Ord Mantell was based on concept art by Joe Johnston for The Empire Strikes Back. This design was later reused in issues of Marvel's Star Wars (c. 1982) and the first story arc of Dark Horse's X-wing Rogue Squadron (c. 1995, drawn by Williamson's assistant Allen Nunis). It was later distinguished as an All Terrain Advance Raider, a variant of the All Terrain Scout Transport (AT-ST).

Admiral Ackbar made his debut in the comic before his film appearance in Return of the Jedi (1983). The story arc was incorrectly thought by some to be titled Revenge of the Jedi due to an image featuring Ackbar promoting the film using its working title. The story was called It's a Trap in the 2018 collection after the character's famous line from the film.

Many other elements have been referenced in later works, including Star Wars reference books:

- The Constancia Affair asserts that C-3PO was activated hundreds of years before the events of the original film on the planet Affa. A Guide to the Star Wars Universe (1994) affirms Affa as the droid's planet of origin.
- The Night Beast's origins as a Massassi warrior are explored in Tales of the Jedi: The Sith War (1995–96).
- Characters revealed to be robotic replicants in Iceworld appear in person in Ryder Windham's comic Shadow Stalker (1997), a spin-off from the 1996 Shadows of the Empire multimedia project, and which was published by Dark Horse. Shadow Stalker also mentions the froglike Chubbit species from the comic strip.
- Blackhole's black-armored stormtroopers return in the Dark Horse comic Crimson Empire (1997–98), and were made into an action figure by Hasbro.
- Two Imperial officers from the comic were featured in the 1998 video game Star Wars: Rebellion.
- Tanith Shire is referenced in the New Jedi Order novel Agents of Chaos I: Hero's Trial (2000) by James Luceno and Windham's young-adult novel The Life of Luke Skywalker (2009). The latter also features the witch who impersonated Shire in The Paradise Detour.
- The gang from Gambler's World appears in Jude Watson's Jedi Apprentice: The Threat Within (2002).
- Skorr appears in Scholastic's Star Wars: Adventures #6 – The Warlords of Balmorra (2003) by Ryder Windham.
- An Imperial space station featured in Darth Vader Strikes and Race for Survival appears in the Clone Wars novel Yoda: Dark Rendezvous (2004)
- The boggy planet from It's a Trap appears in the Star Wars: Legacy comic book series (2006–2010).
- Ryder Windham's young-adult novel A New Hope: The Life of Luke Skywalker (2009) features Chubbits.
- Chubbits again appear in the Dark Horse comic series Star Wars: Dark Times (2009), when they were redesigned somewhat by Doug Wheatley, who added a round membrane behind the eye.

In April 2014, the entire Star Wars Expanded Universe was declared non-canon by Disney and rebranded as 'Legends'. The canon live-action streaming television series The Mandalorian features a froglike species similar to Chubbits, including aspects of Wheatley's redesign.
