= Cynthia Martin =

American comic book artist

- Born: September 19, 1961 (age 65)
- Areas: Cartoonist, Penciller, Inker
- Pseudonym: Cindy Martin
- Notable works: Star Wars

Cynthia Martin (also known as Cindy Martin; born September 19, 1961) is an American comic book artist who worked on the Marvel Comics Star Wars title during the mid-1980s.

Martin's clean lines and strong sense of movement during action scenes set her apart from other Star Wars artists of the time in addition to being one of the few women working in American comic books. Her work displayed the influence of Japanese manga long before it became common in American comics.

== Career ==
Cynthia Martin's first published comic book was the Ms. Victory Special #1 (AC Comics, 1985). She then got the Star Wars assignment at Marvel Comics, where she drew the covers for issues #92 and 93, and then pencilled most of the issues between #94 and 107. She collaborated with writer Ann Nocenti on a three-part storyline which appeared in the Spider-Man titles in December 1987. At DC Comics, Martin worked on Wonder Woman and the War of the Gods limited series with George Pérez. Martin has also worked for Dark Horse Comics, Eclipse Comics, First Comics, Topps Comics, and a number of other small press publishers.

Martin then began illustrating early-reader "graphic biographies" for Capstone Press. She illustrated How to Draw Comic Heroes In 2008, Martin's projects included books for ABDO Publications and the graphic novel Shadowflight.

On May 1, 2010, she was inducted as an Honorary Member of the 501st Legion international costuming organization in recognition of her contributions to the Star Wars saga.

== Bibliography ==
Comics work includes:

== AC Comics ==
- Ms. Victory #1
- Bad Girl Backlash #1

=== DC Comics ===
- Blue Beetle vol. 2 #3, 6 (2006)
- War of the Gods #1–2 (1991)
- Wonder Woman vol. 2 #45, 50, 52, 60, Annual #2 (1989–1991)

=== Eclipse Comics ===
- California Girls #6
- Dragonflight #3 (1991)
- Total Eclipse #3 (1988)

=== Marvel Comics ===
- The Amazing Spider-Man #295 (1987)
- Girl Comics #2 (2010)
- Marvel Comics Presents #60–67 (Poison serial) (1990–1991)
- Midnight Sons #1 (1993)
- The Spectacular Spider-Man #133 (1987)
- Star Wars #92–93 (covers only), #94–97, 100–101, 103–107 (1985–1986)
- Web of Spider-Man #33, Annual #4 (1987–1988)

=== Other publishers ===
- Atilla the Ham (Modanim Company) production
- Crossroads (First Comics) 1
- Elvira, Mistress of the Dark (Claypool Comics) 9, 25
- Fan Base (Komikwerks)
- Go Girls (Dark Horse Comics) 1–3 (cover art)
- Jason Goes to Hell (Topps Comics) 1
- Psi Kix (Krislin Company) storyboards
- Renegade Romance (Renegade Press) 1
- Roller Derby Drama (Silver Phoenix Entertainment) 1
- SPECWAR (Peter Four Productions) colorist
- Wild Irish Roses (Conari Press)
- Zoombies (Boom Studios)

=== Capstone Press graphic novels ===
- Elizabeth Blackwell: America's First Woman Doctor
- George Washington: Leading a New Nation
- Helen Keller: Courageous Advocate
- Jane Goodall: Animal Scientist
- Sacagawea: Journey into the West
- Theodore Roosevelt
- Wilma Rudolph: Olympic Track Star
- Elizabeth Cady Stanton: Women's Rights Pioneer
- Booker T. Washington: Great American Educator
- Hedy Lamarr and a Secret Communication System
- Story of the Statue of Liberty
- Story of the Star-Spangled Banner
- Nathan Hale: Revolutionary Spy
- Max Axiom, Super Scientist: Sound
- Max Axiom, Super Scientist: Adaptation
- Max Axiom, Super Scientist: Food Chains
- Max Axiom, Super Scientist: Magnetism
- Max Axiom, Super Scientist: Global Warming
