= Star Wars (1977 comic book) =

Comic book series

- Issue #1 cover

Publication information
- Publisher: Marvel Comics
- Schedule: Monthly
- Format: Ongoing series
- Genre: Science fiction
- Publication date: April 1977 – May 2019
- No. of issues: 108 (and 3 annuals)

Creative team
- Written by: Roy Thomas (1977–1978); Archie Goodwin (1978–1985); Jo Duffy (1979–1986); David Michelinie (1981–1983)
- Artists: Howard Chaykin (1977–1978); Carmine Infantino (1978–1982); Al Williamson (1980–1981); Carlos Garzon (1980–1981); Walt Simonson (1981–1983); Tom Palmer (1981–1985); Ron Frenz (1983–1985); Cynthia Martin (1985–1986)

Star Wars is a comic book series published by Marvel Comics from April 12, 1977 (Note: The issue is cover dated July 1977 but was released on April 12, 1977.) to May 27, 1986. Featuring classic Star Wars characters Luke Skywalker, Princess Leia, Han Solo, Chewbacca, C-3PO, and R2-D2, the first six issues adapt the May 1977 film Star Wars. The series chronicled their subsequent adventures for 107 issues and three annuals, including a six-issue adaptation of the 1980 sequel film The Empire Strikes Back in 1980–1981. In 2019, the series was revived for a single issue.

== Development and publication ==
Star Wars creator George Lucas initially approached Warren Publications and DC Comics to publish a Star Wars comic book prior to the film's release as a means of publicity. Charles Lippincott, Lucasfilm's publicity supervisor, approached publisher Stan Lee at Marvel Comics in 1975 about the project, but Lee declined to consider such a proposal until the film was completed. Writer Roy Thomas met Lippincott around this same time, and was asked to write the comic at Lucas's request, based on his work on Conan the Barbarian. Thomas decided to accept the commission when Lippincott showed him a production sketch of the Cantina sequence, convincing him that the project was a space opera along the lines of Planet Comics. Stan Lee was persuaded to greenlight the project in a second meeting arranged by Thomas in 1976, reportedly when he heard that Alec Guinness would be involved. Lucas also requested artist Howard Chaykin, who was allowed to visit Lucasfilm's offices on the Universal Studios Lot to gather reference art.

Issue #1 of Star Wars was released for sale on April 12, 1977, and Marvel published the series from 1977 to 1986, lasting 107 issues and three annuals. According to former Marvel Editor-In-Chief Jim Shooter, the strong sales of Star Wars comics saved Marvel financially in 1977 and 1978. Since movie tie-in comics rarely sold well at that time, Lee negotiated a publishing arrangement which gave no royalties to Lucasfilm until the series' sales exceeded 100,000. At that point, legal arrangements could be revisited. The comic gave Marvel much-needed income during a time when the comic industry suffered generally because of rising newsprint costs and a declining number of retail outlets like traditional newsstands and mom-and-pop stores—until the direct market concept established itself in the late 1970s. The series was one of the industry's top selling titles in 1979 and 1980, with the 100,000 copy sales quota being surpassed, allowing Lippincott to renegotiate the royalty arrangements.

Issues #1–6 featured an adaptation of the events of Star Wars by Roy Thomas and Howard Chaykin. (Note: Also released as an oversized 2-volume Marvel Special Edition with unique front and back covers in 1977; the second issue included three new recap pages. A third volume collected all six issues with new front and back cover art, along with four pinup posters.) Original stories began appearing as of issue #7 (January 1978) by the same creative team. Thomas continued the series with a Seven Samurai-style storyline focusing on Han Solo and Chewbacca, after being told not to use Darth Vader, cover the Clone Wars, or develop a romance between Luke Skywalker and Princess Leia. Lippincott told Thomas that Lucas disliked his new green rabbit character, Jaxxon. This and the "sacred cow" status that the franchise had obtained led to Thomas's departure. Writer Archie Goodwin and artist Carmine Infantino took over the series as of #11 (May 1978). While generally following a single serialized storyline, the series occasionally included stories which take place before the events of the films, such as issue #17 (November 1978) featuring Luke Skywalker on Tatooine, and #24 (June 1979) with Obi-Wan Kenobi.

In 1979, Goodwin visited Lucasfilm's Los Angeles offices to collect contact prints and other reference for a six-issue adaptation of the 1980 sequel film The Empire Strikes Back by artists Al Williamson and Carlos Garzon. Williamson was offered the job at Lucasfilm's specific request, as Lucas had an appreciation of his EC Comics and Flash Gordon work. The adaptation was released as a paperback book, (Note: For the comic, Yoda was initially based on conceptual designer Ralph McQuarrie's paintings; this version was published in the initial paperback. For the single issues, select panels were recreated to match Yoda's appearance from the film.) a magazine (Marvel Super Special #16), an oversized tabloid edition, and as issues #39–44 (September 1980–February 1981) of the series. According to Ted Edwards, "The artwork reached a new high, with Williamson penciling and Carlos Garzon inking likenesses of the characters that had an accuracy never before seen in the series."

As Goodwin made his departure, Louise Simonson joined as editor. She hired her husband, Walt Simonson, as penciler beginning with issue #49, and Tom Palmer as inker. He was joined by writer David Michelinie starting with issue #51 (September 1981). The creative team was prevented from developing Luke's Jedi training or his relationships with Leia and Vader, or using Han, Jabba, Boba Fett, Obi-Wan, and Yoda. (Note: Lucasfilm prevented the team from developing a story featuring a second Death Star.) An unused John Carter, Warlord of Mars story, which had sat in inventory after Marvel had cancelled that series, was rewritten and redrawn, and published in Star Wars #53 (November 1981). Walt Simonson left the series after issue #66, shortly followed by Michelinie. Ron Frenz became the regular artist starting with #71 (May 1983) and Jo Duffy, who had written #24, returned as writer. Together, they formed a backstory leading to Return of the Jedi. Marvel's adaptation of the film (October 1983–January 1984) appeared in a separate four-issue limited series as well as in Marvel Super Special #27 and in a mass market paperback. Starting in 1984, the series was primarily written by Duffy. Art for the final year and a half of the series was by Cynthia Martin.

Exploring a one-shot revival of the series, Marvel senior editor Mark Paniccia contacted Walt Simonson to see if he was interested in contributing. Simonson said he would have liked to have created a sequel to Goodwin's oversized #50, "The Crimson Forever", illustrated by him, Al Williamson, and Tom Palmer. Marvel writer Matt Rosenberg pitched the basis of the sequel, "Forever Crimson", published in 2019 as issue #108.

== Plot ==
After the Rebel Alliance secures the Death Star plans and destroys the Imperial battle station, Han Solo and Chewbacca depart Yavin to repay Jabba the Hut, but space pirate Crimson Jack steals their reward money. The despondent duo is hired to protect some farmers from a gang. On their way back to Yavin, Jack captures the Millennium Falcon. He also holds Princess Leia captive; she was in the process of following Luke Skywalker to a water planet that he was scoping out as a possible Rebel base. Han and Leia lead Jack to Luke, who has crash-landed and learned that, since the time of the Galactic Republic, the planet's denizens have been using jamming devices to bring down ships for salvage. Annoyed by the jamming frequencies, native sea serpents revolt and attack; the conflict escalates when the governor increases the frequency to bring down Jack's cruiser. The Falcon crew picks up Luke and destroys the jamming device. Jack attacks Han, but the smuggler defeats the pirate.

The Falcon crew discovers the wreckage of a House of Tagge ship, which the Empire has made to look like a Rebel attack. They take shelter on the Wheel, a neutral gambling station. Its administrator detains Leia, and Han and Chewie are forced to fight in gladiator battles. Luke, Leia, and the droids escape in a small craft; Darth Vader arrives and almost captures them, but Han disables his Star Destroyer's tractor beam. Luke and Leia return to the base on Yavin, where they thwart the attacks of the Tagge family. Jabba catches Han at one of his hideouts, but ship-eating mites force the crime lord to take refuge on the Falcon—in exchange for cancelling the smuggler's debt. After returning Jabba to Tatooine, Han and Chewie run into Luke in the Mos Eisley cantina, where the latter was recruiting pilots. After witnessing a test of the Tagges' freezing superweapon, the rebels follow them in the Falcon. Luke fights Baron Orman Tagge in a lightsaber duel and destroys the superweapon. Orman is assumed dead, but actually kept alive by Vader. Domina Tagge, a member of a peaceful planet, comes to Yavin and asks Luke to serve as a Rebel representative. Acting as an Imperial representative, Vader blames Orman's apparent death on Luke, causing Domina to turn on him. She determines that the pair will duel for the planet's favor, but plans for both to die. Orman, whom Vader causes to take his appearance, attempts to kill Luke, but is himself slain. Meanwhile, Jabba discovers Crimson Jack's ruined cruiser and restores the bounty on Han.

The Rebellion takes refuge on Hoth, but is driven out by the Empire. Obi-Wan Kenobi's Force spirit guides Luke to Jedi Master Yoda, who trains him. Meanwhile, Han is captured by Vader and frozen in carbonite in a plot to bait Luke. Against the wishes of his teachers, Luke goes to help his friends by facing Vader, who has a stunning revelation for him. Chewbacca and new ally Lando Calrissian set out after bounty hunter Boba Fett, who intends to deliver the cryopreserved Han to Jabba. While Vader continues to search for Luke, the latter investigates a Star Destroyer whose crew has been debilitated by the Crimson Forever, a virus emanating from a mysterious jewel; Luke is afflicted as well. Lando and Chewbacca encounter Leia at a temporary Rebel base on Golrath; she explains Luke's situation. This prompts Chewie to recount a recent adventure in which Han returned two similar jewels to a temple in the Red Nebula. Leia, Lando, and Chewbacca head to the nebula and discover a Tagge ship whose crew has also succumbed to the illness. Aboard, Domina Tagge reveals that she hired bounty hunters (Note: Including IG-88, Dengar, Bossk, and Zuckuss) to steal the jewels from the temple, but the Empire took one and people began to succumb to the fever. Domina brings the other jewel to the derelict Star Destroyer, saving all the infected survivors.

Leia leads a scouting expedition to determine if a forest planet will be suitable for a permanent Rebel base. The Rebellion's power is drained by intelligent hoojibs, who reveal that a flying monster has prevented them from using their usual source of energy. The Rebels drive out the monster, and the hoojibs invite them to stay. Meanwhile, Lando returns to Cloud City, which seems to be empty until he is attacked by a deranged Lobot. Then, an Imperial bomb squad lands to disarm explosives planted by ugnaughts. Meanwhile, Luke and a female pilot, Shira, leave to check on Lando as he has not reported in. Lando battles stormtroopers, and one of the bombs goes off. Lando calls a truce with an Imperial officer, who helps him fix Lobot. The cyborg then uses his cybernetic implants to disconnect the bombs. The officer kicks Lando off the platform, and Lobot uses a jet pack to save him. On the planet surface, they are picked up by a boat of ugnaughts and transported back to the platform; Luke arrives and uses the Force to make it appear that the rest of the bombs explode to scare away the Imperials.

Leia leads a procedure to hide the Rebel fleet inside the system's sun using a shield generator, then departs for the planet's surface to investigate the arrival of Imperial ships. R2-D2 detects a malfunction in the generators, and he and C-3PO find that the entire crew has been knocked unconscious by circuit fumes. The droids use a jet pack to connect an energy cable from one of the cruisers to the shield generator, saving the fleet. Meanwhile, Luke, Lando, and Chewbacca visit a space market to purchase four refurbished TIE fighters. Shira and Luke use them to raid an Imperial armada, but Luke returns to the base to discover that he killed Shira. Luke infiltrates a data vault, where he finds evidence that Shira was selected by Vader to infiltrate the Rebellion and kill Luke; Vader keeps Shira alive in a bacta tank on his Star Destroyer. Using the evidence from the Imperial vault, Luke is acquitted of Shira's murder. The Rebels discover that the rock material of their former base on Golrath records its surroundings. The Imperials soon make the same discovery, and Leia infiltrates the base to destroy it.

The Rebels learn that one of Boba Fett's associates was cut out of the reward for Han and may be willing to provide intel. Leia follows a lead that Dengar may be on Mandalore, and discovers a caravan of Imperial slavers. She runs into a Mandalorian warrior named Fenn, who keeps Dengar in a cage. Dengar tricks Leia into freeing him in exchange for intel, but he signals Imperials, who bring her to the chief slaver. Fenn rescues Leia and recaptures Dengar. Meanwhile, Lando and Chewie obtain a lead on Bossk's location, which matches that of Luke's lead on IG-88. Luke runs into some pirates he knows, while Lando says he found Han; it turns out to be one of the pirates frozen in a similar carbonite block. Bossk and IG-88 try to freeze Luke, Lando, and the other pirates, until Chewie arrives to help them.

Amongst other missions, Luke and Leia rescue Wedge Antilles, who had been missing in action since the Battle of Hoth. A search for a Rebel intelligence agent leads to Bothan-acquired intel for the Empire's second Death Star. The heroes liberate Han from Jabba, and work together to destroy the Death Star. Luke confronts Vader, who ends up overthrowing the Emperor. The Alliance then works to establish a new republic and subdue the remnants of the Empire and other sinister forces, expanding into intergalactic conflict.

Domina Tagge and her bounty hunters resurface with a plan to capture the Crimson Forever jewels by encasing them in heavy metal, a delivery of which happens to include the robotic skeleton of Beilert Valance—who was defeated by Vader while protecting Luke's identity. The cyborg comes back to life and helps the Star Warriors foil Domina's selfish plot. The healing powers of the unified jewels restore Valance's human body even as he sacrifices himself to ensure the destruction of the temperamental gems.

== Legacy ==
Introduced in 1978, the droid-hating cyborg Beilert Valance predates the explicit introduction of other bounty hunters in the Star Wars franchise. Boba Fett's development has been argued to have been influenced by Valance and Marvel's Punisher, which Goodwin previously wrote for. Additionally, Valance has been noted as being very similar to the title character(s) of the Terminator franchise, which debuted with the 1984 film The Terminator.

According to Ryder Windham, the comic was not acknowledged by Lucasfilm while planning new stories because little story control had been enforced during its creation. Some elements appeared in the Star Wars Expanded Universe, such as the Wheel in a 2003 issue of Star Wars: Republic and the character Lumiya in the Legacy of the Force book series (2006–2008). The remains of a character resembling Jaxxon the rabbit appear in the 2012 The Clone Wars episode "A Sunny Day in the Void". In April 2014, the licensed Star Wars Expanded Universe material released up to that point (except for The Clone Wars) were rebranded by Lucasfilm as Legends and declared non-canon to the franchise in order to create a blank slate for the sequel trilogy.

Alex Ross created a realistic reimagining of the cover of the series' first issue as a variant cover for the first issue of Marvel's 2015 self-titled Star Wars series. Jaxxon appears on a different variant cover of that issue by John Tyler Christopher, and works with the Rebellion in the current Star Wars Adventures series. An action figure of Jaxxon was released as part of Hasbro's Black Series.

While in the original comic Vader learns Luke Skywalker's name personally, a crossover story between 2015's Star Wars and Darth Vader reveals that Fett gave Vader this information. Beilert Valance entered the modern Star Wars canon in the comic Han Solo: Imperial Cadet (2018), (Note: The original comic establishes that Valance was a former stormtrooper and suffered his injuries in combat. Imperial Cadet shows that he trained in the Academy with Han; he is injured in a TIE fighter crash.) and appears in the series Target Vader (2019) (Note: Valance is the main character in the series, in which he wears his signature blue outfit. More of his backstory is explored, including how he became a cyborg.) and Bounty Hunters (2020–present). (Note: The latter series takes place after The Empire Strikes Back, whereas Marvel's Star Wars #29 depicted him dying at Vader's hands.) (Note: Valance also appears in "Forever Crimson", the 2019 revival issue of the original Marvel series, which takes place after the formation of the New Republic.) Domina Tagge is featured in the 2020–2021 Doctor Aphra comic.

== Other publications ==
- A limited-edition Return of the Jedi series, composed of four issues available as the standard versions, the Direct Market ones, the Canadian-priced editions and the six two-book "bagged" editions, was also released. (In the ordering of the regular series, this mini-series took place between issues #80 and #81).
- In 1983, Buena Vista Records adapted two issues of the series into children's books (with accompanying read-along tapes).
- A Star Wars: Droids series was released, with two eight-book versions (standard and Direct Market), and the three-issue Canadian version. The series was also reprinted in Great Britain.
- A Star Wars: Ewoks series was published, and it had fourteen standard issues and fourteen Direct Market ones, seven Canadian issues, was reprinted in Star Comics Magazine #1–4 and many British magazines, and was translated into German as Die Ewoks Comic-Magazin.
- The adaptation of A New Hope was rereleased with new colorations, first by Dark Horse Comics in 1994 (colored by Pamela Rambo) as part of its Classic Star Wars reprint series, (Note: Also released as a trade paperback in 1995) and later by Marvel in 2015 (colored by Chris Sotomayor). Sotomayor also colored Marvel's 2015 rereleases of The Empire Strikes Back and Return of the Jedi.
- In 2015, Marvel collected the entire series in three hardcover editions, which include the three annual comics, the Return of the Jedi adaptation, and various other classic Star Wars comics. Beginning in 2016, the series began to be rereleased with bonus content as Epic Collection: Star Wars – The Original Marvel Years, with six volumes released in total.
- In 2019, Marvel released a new issue (#108), the franchise having returned to the publisher after over two decades with Dark Horse. The story, titled "Forever Crimson", continues Archie Goodwin's Star Wars #50, "The Crimson Forever". In early 2020, Marvel released a trade paperback collecting the issue along with others focused on Valance.

=== Foreign editions ===
The series was also translated and produced under license by some non-American publishers:

- Star Wars Weekly (1978–1982; British market)
  - Star Wars Weekly by Marvel UK (122 issues, 2 Annuals and 1 Collected Edition)
  - Star Wars: The Empire Strikes Back Weekly by Marvel UK (22 issues; The Empire Strikes Back-themed)
  - Star Wars: The Empire Strikes Back Monthly by Marvel UK (19 issues; The Empire Strikes Back-themed)
  - Star Wars Monthly by Marvel UK (13 issues)
  - Star Wars: The Empire Strikes Back Annual by Marvel UK (2 Annuals; The Empire Strikes Back-themed)
  - Star Wars: The Empire Strikes Back Movie Compilation by Marvel UK (1 Collected Edition; The Empire Strikes Back-themed)
  - Star Wars: Return of the Jedi Weekly by Marvel UK (105 issues, 2 Annuals, 5 Specials; Return of the Jedi-themed)
  - Star Wars Annual reprints in Spider-Man and the Zoids #15–22
- Star Wars: Ewoks reprints in Spidey Comic #661–666 (British market; 1985; Ewoks-themed)
- Star Wars Annual featuring the Ewoks (British market; 1985; one-shot book; Ewoks-themed)
- Ewoks Monthly (British market; 1987–1988; 10 issues, 1 Annual issue; Ewoks-themed)
- Droids TV Special by Marvel UK (British market; 1988; one-shot book; Droids-themed)
- Droids Spring Special by Marvel UK (British market; 1989; one-shot book; Droids-themed)
- Star Wars: Droids reprints in Bumper Comics #14–25 (British market; 1989; Droids-themed)
- Star Wars by Junior Press Strip (Dutch market; 22 known issues, 18 known Specials; 2 Collected Editions)
- Tähtien Sota/Star Wars: Tähtien Sota (1978–1987; Finnish market)
  - Tähtien Sota (1978–1983)
  - Star Wars: Tähtien Sota (1983–1987; 24 known issues, 2 Collected Editions)
- Titans by Lug (French market; 78 Star Wars-themed issues, 4 Star Wars Collected Editions)
- Krieg der Sterne/Star Wars (1979–1986; German market)
  - Volume I: Krieg der Sterne (1979–1984; 22 issues)
  - Volume II: Star Wars (1984-1986; 12 issues)
  - Das Imperium schlägt zurück (2 Movie Adaptations; The Empire Strikes Back-themed)
  - Die Rückkehr Der Jedi-Ritter (one-shot Movie Adaptation; Return of the Jedi-themed)
  - Die Ewoks Comic-Magazin (2 issues; Ewoks-themed)
- Guerre Stellari by Mondadori (1978; Italian market; 14 issues, 1 Return of the Jedi-themed Special Edition)
- L'Impero colpisce ancora by Oscar Mondadori (1980; Italian market; one-shot Movie Adaptation; The Empire Strikes Back-themed)
- Clásicos del Cine Presenta: La Guerra de las Galaxias by Editorial Novaro (Mexican market; 3 known issues)
- Domingos Alegres: La Guerra de las Galaxias: El Imperio Contraataca by Editorial Novaro (Mexican market; 3 known issues; The Empire Strikes Back-themed)
- Novedades Editores Festival Fantastico by Editorial Novaro (Mexican market; 2 known Star Wars-themed issues)

== See also ==
- Star Wars (comic strip)
