= Classic Star Wars =

Comic book series

Classic Star Wars is a series of various classic Star Wars comics reprinted by Dark Horse Comics between 1992 and 1996. It notably includes compilations of the weekly newspaper Star Wars comic strips written by Archie Goodwin and illustrated by Al Williamson; these were published as 20 single issues between 1992 and 1994 with new cover art by Williamson and others, (Note: Williamson and his assistant Allen Nunis created new art to extend some panels to fit the comic-page-size layouts arranged by Dark Horse's editors. Nunis, Bret Blevins, Tom Yeates, Mark Schultz, and George Evans also created some of the cover art.) and collected as three trade paperbacks between 1994 and 1996. (Note: These also feature unique covers by Williamson and are titled In Deadly Pursuit (1994), The Rebel Storm (1995), and Escape to Hoth (1996). Each volume features an introduction; these are by Goodwin, Kevin J. Anderson, and Williamson, respectively. The first volume also includes an explanation of how Dark Horse compiled the comics by editor Bob Cooper.) (Note: Beginning with issue #8, an opening crawl recaps the story so far, but these are missing from the trade paperbacks, except for the beginning of Volume Three.) While originally achromatic, the comics were colorized for these reprints. (Note: By artists including Steve Buccellato and Matthew Hollingsworth)

The Classic Star Wars banner also includes reprints of Marvel's original adaptations of the original trilogy from the self-titled comic (over two issues each in 1994, with new colorization in the case of A New Hope), (Note: With covers by Arthur Adams, Adam Hughes, Williamson, and Cam Kennedy) Russ Manning's comic strip (as Classic Star Wars: The Early Adventures), a reprint of issue #98 of Marvel's Star Wars (as Classic Star Wars: The Vandelhelm Mission), (Note: Originally titled Supply and Demand (1985), the comic by Goodwin and Williamson features Fondor, the shipyard construction planet they introduced in the Darth Vader Strikes newspaper story.) and various colorized comics originally printed by Marvel UK's magazine, including many by Alan Moore (as Classic Star Wars: Devilworlds). (Note: The final page of Moore's story Dark Lord's Conscience was excluded in its original print because it was accidentally not delivered to the artist, John Stokes. Fourteen years later, Stokes created the last page for the comic's reprint in Devilworlds.)

Classic Star Wars
Classic Star Wars #1–20	August 1992 – June 1994
Classic Star Wars: The Early Adventures #1–9	August 1994 – April 1995
Classic Star Wars: Devilworlds #1–2	August–September 1996

== Trade paperbacks ==
- Volume One: In Deadly Pursuit (collects Star Wars #1–7, 196 pages, June 1994, ISBN 1-56971-109-7)
- Volume Two: The Rebel Storm (collects Star Wars #8–14, 208 pages, July 1995, ISBN 1-56971-106-2)
- Star Wars (collects Star Wars vol. 1 #1–6, 104 pages, November 1995, ISBN 1-56971-086-4)
- The Empire Strikes Back (collects Star Wars vol. 1 #39–44, 104 pages, November 1995, ISBN 1-56971-088-0)
- Return of the Jedi (collects Star Wars: Return of the Jedi #1–4, 104 pages, November 1995, ISBN 1-56971-087-2)
- Volume Three: Escape to Hoth (collects Star Wars #15–20, 208 pages, January 1996, ISBN 1-56971-093-7)
- The Early Adventures (collects Star Wars: The Early Adventures #1–9, 240 pages, May 1997, ISBN 1-56971-178-X)
- Han Solo at Stars' End (collects Star Wars: Han Solo at Stars' End #1–3, 104 pages, October 1997, ISBN 1-56971-254-9)
- Marvel Epic Collection: Star Wars – The Newspaper Strips vol. 1 (January 2017, ISBN 978-1302904647)
- Marvel Epic Collection: Star Wars – The Newspaper Strips vol. 2 (July 2019, ISBN 978-1302917371)

== Related publications ==
In 1991, Russ Cochran published a 2,500-copy limited run of a three-volume hardcover boxset of all of Goodwin and Williamson's Star Wars comic strips from 1981 to 1984, signed by both creators, and featuring new cover illustrations by the latter. (Note: These were used as reference for the Classic Star Wars compilations.)

In 1999, Dark Horse released six issues of black-and-white reprints of Marvel's self-titled comic and related works as Classic Star Wars: A Long Time Ago.... with covers utilizing conceptual design by Ralph McQuarrie.

Recolored versions of Marvel's entire comic series were released across seven trade paperbacks as Star Wars: A Long Time Ago... between 2002 and 2003:

- A Long Time Ago...: Doomworld (collects Star Wars #1–20, 336 pages, July 2002, ISBN 1-56971-754-0)
- A Long Time Ago...: Dark Encounters (collects Star Wars #21–38 and Annual #1, 336 pages, July 2002, ISBN 1-56971-785-0)
- A Long Time Ago...: Resurrection of Evil (collects Star Wars #39–53, 344 pages, November 2002, ISBN 1-56971-786-9)
- A Long Time Ago...: Screams of the Void (collects Star Wars #54–67 and Annual #2, 376 pages, January 2003, ISBN 1-56971-787-7)
- A Long Time Ago...: Fool's Bounty (collects Star Wars #68–81 and Annual #3, 376 pages, March 2003, ISBN 1-56971-906-3)
- A Long Time Ago...: Wookiee World (collects Star Wars #82–95, 360 pages, May 2003, ISBN 1-56971-907-1)
- A Long Time Ago...: Far, Far Away (collects Star Wars #96–107, 312 pages, July 2003, ISBN 1-56971-908-X)

Between 2017 and 2018, The Library of American Comics collected the entirety of the Star Wars comic strip in its original black-and-white form in three volumes as Star Wars: The Complete Classic Newspaper Comics.

== Reception ==
Steve Watson reviewed Classic Star Wars 3 for Arcane magazine, rating it a 3 out of 10 overall. Watson comments that "This is very weak indeed. The Star Wars concept deserves much better treatment than this basic pulp and clearly does not work in this format." Conversely, internet reviewer John Hansen says, "The Goodwin/Williamson strips are all about the childhood wonder brought out by the original trilogy and fans' memories of seeing the films for the first time."

== See also ==
- Splinter of the Mind's Eye
