= Star Wars Chess =

1993 video game

- Developer: The Software Toolworks
- Publisher: Mindscape
- Platforms: MS-DOS, Windows 3.x, Sega CD
- Release: 1993: MS-DOS; November 1994: Windows
- Genre: Chess
- Modes: Single-player, multiplayer

Star Wars Chess is a 1993 chess video game developed by The Software Toolworks, based on the Star Wars film franchise and published by Mindscape for MS-DOS, Sega CD, and Windows 3.x. A 3DO version was planned but never released.

== Gameplay ==
The game uses characters from the films in lieu of normal chess pieces, and a short animated battle takes place when a piece is taken, much like in the similar game Battle Chess (which itself was inspired by the holographic chess game shown in Star Wars. All 72 animated capture sequences were produced and directed by Kevin Coffey, assisted by a team of animators, who recollected on his personal website: “ as in real life, sometimes the good guys won and sometimes they lost. It was all in good fun, however.”

== Reception ==
Computer Gaming World concluded that T2 Chess Wars and Star Wars Chess "are examples of marketing at its best (or worst, depending on your point of view)".

Mega Magazine giving Star Wars Chess a 60 percent rating stating "The chances are that if you take your chess at all seriously, you wouldn't really enjoy this."

In 1996, Computer Gaming World declared Star Wars Chess the 49th-worst computer game ever released stating: "Proof that there really is no intelligent life (or AI) even in a galaxy far, far away".

GamePro magazine however praised the game's action scenes, sound, detailed animation and stating "Chess purists and Star Wars purists alike will enjoy this one. Most impressive!"
