= Sabacc =

Fictional board game

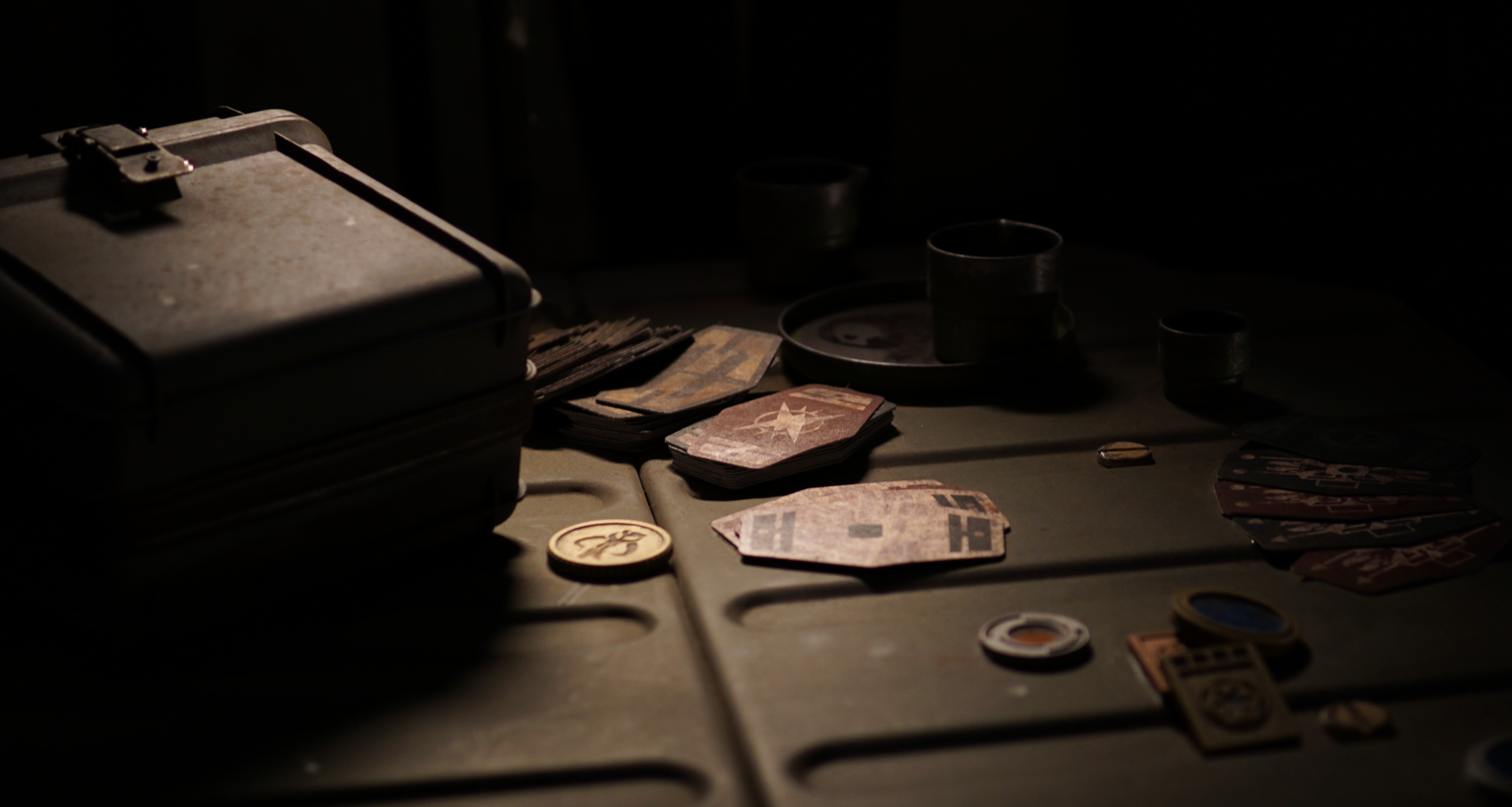
A game of Sabacc, played at Galaxy's Edge.

Sabacc is a primarily fictional gambling card game, (with similarities to baccarat, blackjack, and poker — adding and subtracting numbered cards), originating from the Star Wars space opera franchise, where it is a common pastime of such characters as Han Solo and Lando Calrissian. The game is best known as the high-stake game played by Solo that won him his starship, the Millennium Falcon, from Lando. It has been described as "the most popular card game in the Star Wars galaxy."

It debuted in the 1983 novel Lando Calrissian and the Mindharp of Sharu by L. Neil Smith, and has also been portrayed in a number of other works of the franchise, such as Solo: A Star Wars Story (2018), the first film to actually depict a sabacc game being played, and Star Wars Outlaws (2024). The first sabacc ruleset was published in 1989; however, several other rule-sets have been published since 2015. While the game is commonly described as a card game, some variants are known to use dice.

== History ==
=== In films and books ===
The game is best known as the high-stake game played by Han Solo in which he won the Millennium Falcon from Lando Calrissian, and has been described as "one of the most well-known elements of the Star Wars underworld". The first mention of the game is in the second draft of the screenplay for The Empire Strikes Back (1980), where Han says his friend Lando Calrissian won the gas mine in a "sabacca game". It was next mentioned in the 1983 novel Lando Calrissian and the Mindharp of Sharu by L. Neil Smith and over the years has made appearances in a number of other Star Wars media, such as the "Idiot's Array", a 2015 episode of the animated TV series Star Wars Rebels; most notably it made an appearance in the Solo: A Star Wars Story 2018 movie, which finally featured the scene of Han Solo winning the Millennium Falcon from Lando during a game of sabacc. An online sabacc-themed event was also used as part of the promotional campaign for Solo: A Star Wars Story before the movie's official launch.

=== In games ===
The game's first official (licensed) ruleset and physical release was in the Crisis on Cloud City (1989) supplement for Star Wars: The Roleplaying Game published by West End Games. A reviewer for the Games International magazine wrote that it is "a sort of Blackjack variant, the game doesn't fully use the nicely design deck, and an excessive random element appears to constantly mess up the bidding", necessitating houseruling to make the game more playable.

A simplified version based on the 1989 ruleset was given a limited release in 2015 during the Star Wars Celebration fan convention. As Lucasfilm did not trademark the term sabacc, in 2015, a mobile gaming app Sabacc by Ren Ventures became subject to two lawsuits and a trademark dispute between its publisher and Lucasfilm that eventually ended with Lucasfilm acquiring the trademark in 2018. Also that year, another physical version of the game was published by Hasbro, but due to licensing issues it was named Star Wars Han Solo Card Game. The next official version of the game, this one using the name Sabacc, was distributed around the same time at Disneyland's Star Wars: Galaxy's Edge themed area. Despite both games being licensed, they use relatively different rule sets and both in turn have differences from the 1989 and the 2015 releases; this is sometimes rationalized by fans with the fact that within the Star Wars universe there are a number of sabacc variants, none of which have ever been described as official or dominant.

A new version of the game called Kessel Sabacc was created as a minigame within the 2024 video game Star Wars Outlaws.

Due to the lack of a single official ruleset, over the years, a number of fan-made versions of the game, and accompanying rulesets, have also been made.

== Rules and mechanics ==
No definitive sabacc rules were ever published and there are differences in the rules of the officially licensed variants. The game is often compared to baccarat, blackjack, and poker, as players are adding and subtracting numbered cards to be the first to reach the winning number (which in original sabacc is 23). The version of the game as described in the novel A New Dawn by John Jackson Miller, described as a "classic" in-universe, has both players dealt two cards, which they can keep, trade or reshuffle using a digital randomizer.

The game is generally described as a card game, but some variants, such as "Corellian Spike", also use dice, as depicted in the Star Wars sequel trilogy and in Solo. The Corellian Spike variant also features a smaller deck of cards, with values of −10 to 10, and the target number is no longer 23 but 0.

The Galaxy's Edge version contains no betting rules, likely with the aim to keep it "family-friendly", although this also creates a rule inconsistency since players can fold – but have no reason to do so. This variant uses dice, which are rolled each turn and on a roll of doubles players have to redraw all of their cards. The deck has 62 cards with values ranging from -10 to 10. Players are dealt two cards and play for three rounds, during which they can draw, swap, pass or fold.

The Star Wars Han Solo Card Game variant can be played with two to eight players, and uses a deck of 76 cards divided up into four suits, numbered 1–11. The suits are called Coins, Flasks, Sabers, and Staves, and the face cards are named Commander (value 12), Mistress (value 13), Master (value 14), and Ace (value 1 or 15). In addition to those, there are also cards with values not usually found in blackjack or poker, such as The Idiot (value 0) or The Star (value −17). The cards have a range of −17 to 15, and the game features two betting pots. Players will place bets, aiming for the winning score of 23 or −23.

Kessel Sabacc, as featured in Star Wars Outlaws, involves two decks (a yellow Sand deck and a red Blood deck) numbered 1-6, with players holding one card from each deck and aiming to finish each round with the lowest value matching pair. Sylop cards are a rare wildcard, and Impostor cards are a more common one using a dice roll to determine card value. Each player also has three Shift Tokens which can each be played once per game, with various effects to benefit the player, penalize opponents or impose temporary rule changes. These Shift Tokens are a collectible item within Outlaws, which can be acquired as loot or rewards throughout the story. There are also three cheat options which can be unlocked during the game, allowing the player to view opponents' cards, palm an extra card or use magnetic dice by completing a quick time event successfully, with a risk of being caught.

== See also ==
- Dejarik
