= Brian Daley =

American science fiction writer (1947–1996)

- Born: Brian Charles Daley; December 22, 1947; Englewood, New Jersey, U.S.
- Died: February 11, 1996 (aged 48); Arnold, Maryland, U.S.
- Occupation: Author
- Spouse: Lucia St. Clair Robson
- Writing career
- Genre: Science fiction
- Notable works: The Han Solo Adventures series; The Adventures of Hobart Floyt and Alacrity Fitzhugh series; Robotech series; The Black Hole Travel Agency series

Brian Charles Daley (December 22, 1947 – February 11, 1996) was an American science fiction novelist. He also adapted for radio the Star Wars radio dramas and wrote all of their episodes.

== Biography ==
Daley was born in Englewood, New Jersey at Englewood Hospital, to Charles and Myra Daley. He had an older brother, David, and younger sister, Myra. He grew up in Rockleigh, New Jersey and graduated from Northern Valley Regional High School at Old Tappan in 1965. He then joined the army and served a year-long tour of duty in Vietnam.

After the army, he attended Jersey City State College, now New Jersey City University, majoring in media. During this time, he wrote his first novel, The Doomfarers of Coramonde. He went on to write the first Star Wars spin-off novels, The Han Solo Adventures. Han Solo at Stars' End, the first book of the trilogy, was a New York Times bestseller. Daley also adapted the original Star Wars film trilogy as a series of radio dramas for National Public Radio.

Daley also wrote under the pseudonym Jack McKinney with his good friend of 20 years, James Luceno. Together, they wrote over 20 Robotech novels and collaborated on the Black Hole Travel Agency series. Luceno is responsible for editing the 1,600-page manuscript of Daley's GammaLAW quartet, which was published posthumously. Daley and Luceno were also amongst a team of writers for the 1986 television cartoon series The Adventures of the Galaxy Rangers.

Lucia St. Clair Robson, an author of historical fiction, was Daley's partner of 14 years.

Daley died in Maryland of pancreatic cancer on February 11, 1996, only hours after celebrating the completion of production on the Return of the Jedi radio drama with the cast and crew. The show is dedicated to his memory.

== Bibliography ==
=== Coramonde ===
- The Doomfarers of Coramonde (1977) ISBN 0-345-25708-1
- The Starfollowers of Coramonde (1979) ISBN 978-0-9971040-0-4

=== The Han Solo Adventures ===
- Han Solo at Stars' End (1979)
- Han Solo's Revenge (1979)
- Han Solo and the Lost Legacy (1980)

=== The Adventures of Hobart Floyt and Alacrity Fitzhugh ===
- Requiem for a Ruler of Worlds (1985) ISBN 0-345-314-87-5
- Jinx on a Terran Inheritance (1985) ISBN 0-345-31488-3
- Fall of the White Ship Avatar (1986) ISBN 0-345-32919-8

=== Robotech ===
Written with James Luceno under the shared pseudonym of Jack McKinney.

- Robotech
  - No. 1 Genesis (1987), ISBN 0-345-34133-3
  - No. 2 Battle Cry (1987), ISBN 0-345-34134-1
  - No. 3 Homecoming (1987)
  - No. 4 Battlehymn (1987), ISBN 0-345-34137-6
  - No. 5 Force of Arms (1987), ISBN 0-345-34138-4
  - No. 6 Doomsday (1987), ISBN 0-345-34139-2
  - No. 7 Southern Cross (1987), ISBN 0-345-34140-6
  - No. 8 Metal Fire (1987), ISBN 0-345-34141-4
  - No. 9 The Final Nightmare (1987), ISBN 0-345-34142-2
  - No. 10 Invid Invasion (1987), ISBN 0-345-34143-0
  - No. 11 Metamorphosis (1987), ISBN 0-345-34144-9
  - No. 12 Symphony of Light (1987), ISBN 0-345-34145-7
  - No. 18 The End of the Circle (1990), ISBN 0-345-36311-6
  - No. 19 The Zentraedi Rebellion (1994), ISBN 0-345-38774-0
  - No. 20 The Masters' Gambit (1995)
  - No. 21 Before the Invid Storm (1996)
- The Sentinels
  - No. 1 The Devil's Hand (1988), ISBN 0-345-35300-5
  - No. 2 Dark Powers (1988), ISBN 0-345-35301-3
  - No. 3 Death Dance (1988), ISBN 0-345-35302-1
  - No. 4 World Killers (1988), ISBN 0-345-35304-8
  - No. 5 Rubicon (1988), ISBN 0-345-35305-6

Some of the Robotech novels were later republished as compilation editions.

=== The Black Hole Travel Agency ===
Written with James Luceno under the shared pseudonym of Jack McKinney.

- Event Horizon (1991)
- Artifact of the System (1991)
- Free Radicals (1992)
- Hostile Takeover (1994)

=== NPR dramatizations ===
Expanded dramatizations of the Star Wars movies for National Public Radio.

- Star Wars (1981)
- The Empire Strikes Back (1983)
- Return of the Jedi (1997)

=== GammaLAW ===
Edited by James Luceno, and published posthumously.

- Smoke on the Water (1997)
- Screaming Across the Sky (1998)
- The Broken Country (1998)
- To Water's End (1999)

=== Other novels ===
- Tron (novelization of the film Tron, 1982)
- A Tapestry of Magics (1983)
- Kaduna Memories (written with James Luceno under the shared pseudonym of Jack McKinney, 1990)
