= Lando Calrissian =

Fictional character in the Star Wars universe

- Star Wars character
- Billy Dee Williams as Lando Calrissian (Note: Return of the Jedi (1983))
- First appearance: The Empire Strikes Back
- Created by: George Lucas
- Portrayed by: Billy Dee Williams (Note: The Empire Strikes Back, Return of the Jedi, The Rise of Skywalker); Donald Glover (Note: Solo: A Star Wars Story)
- Voiced by: Various: Billy Dee Williams (Note: The Empire Strikes Back radio drama, Star Wars Jedi Knight II: Jedi Outcast, Star Wars: Battlefront, Robot Chicken, The Cleveland Show, Mad, Lego Star Wars: The Yoda Chronicles, The Lego Movie, Rebels, Star Wars Battlefront (2015 video game), Lego Star Wars: Droid Tales, Lego Star Wars: The Resistance Rises, Lego Star Wars: The Freemaker Adventures and Lego Star Wars: Rebuild the Galaxy); Obba Babatundé (Note: Star Wars Rogue Squadron II: Rogue Leader, Star Wars: Galactic Battlegrounds, Star Wars Rogue Squadron III: Rebel Strike, Kinect Star Wars, Disney Infinity 3.0); Dave Fennoy (Note: X-Wing Alliance); Arye Gross (Note: Return of the Jedi radio drama); Kevin M. Richardson (Note: Demolition); Zeno Robinson (Note: Lego Star Wars: All-Stars); Tabitha St. Germain (Note: Lego Star Wars: The Yoda Chronicles)

In-universe information
- Title: Baron Administrator
- Occupation: Professional gambler; Smuggler; Mining engineer; Administrator; General
- Affiliation: Cloud City; Rebel Alliance; New Republic; Calrissian Enterprises; Resistance
- Children: Kadara Calrissian

Lando Calrissian (/kælˈrɪsiən/; kal-RISS-ee-ən) is a fictitious character in the Star Wars franchise. He was introduced in the original trilogy film The Empire Strikes Back (1980) as the administrator of Cloud City. In the film, he reluctantly betrays his friend Han Solo to Darth Vader, but later helps Han's friends escape from the Galactic Empire. In Return of the Jedi (1983), Lando helps rescue Han from Jabba the Hutt, and later becomes a general in the Rebel Alliance. The standalone film Solo: A Star Wars Story (2018) depicts a younger Lando at the beginning of his relationship with Han, while the sequel film The Rise of Skywalker (2019) shows Lando joining the Resistance in its battle against the First Order.

Lando is portrayed by Billy Dee Williams in The Empire Strikes Back, Return of the Jedi and The Rise of Skywalker. Williams was nominated for the Saturn Award for Best Supporting Actor for his performance in Empire and Jedi. Donald Glover plays Lando in Solo, and is expected to reprise the role in another film that is currently in development. In addition to films, Lando also appears in novels, comics and video games.

== Creation and development ==
When writing The Empire Strikes Back, Star Wars creator George Lucas planned to introduce a gambler-type character, which eventually developed into Lando. Lucas envisioned him as a suave con man with the elegance of James Bond and the wit of Star Trek's Spock, who would be a foil to the "rough" swashbuckler Han Solo. The character would initially support the Empire—believing he could outsmart the Imperials—before coming to see the Rebellion as a more worthy cause.

Lucas thought Lando might look like a normal human, but might actually be a clone from a ruling clan of others just like him, which would cause Princess Leia to distrust him. Lando's clone faction would be partly responsible for the Galactic civil war featured in the original Star Wars trilogy. (Note: Attributed to multiple references:) Lucas imagined Lando as "almost too perfect looking" due to his genes being manipulated in the cloning process; Lucas envisioned the character as similar to Rudolph Valentino.

Lando's cane in The Rise of Skywalker (2019) was designed to resemble Cloud City. The book The Art of Star Wars: The Rise of Skywalker says the Aurebesh text on the cane reads "Baron Lando Calrissian". Fans, however, translated it as "Landonis Balthazar Calrissian III", which was confirmed to be Lando's full name by writers of The Rise of Skywalker.

Jonathan Kasdan, a co-writer of Solo: A Star Wars Story, stated that Lando is pansexual. He added that he would have loved to have put a "more explicitly LGBT" character into the film. When Donald Glover, who plays Lando, was asked about the character's pansexuality, he responded, "How can you not be pansexual in space? There's so many things to have sex with." (Note: Attributed to multiple references:) In 2021, Lando appeared in a series of Marvel comics featuring LGBT characters. In the movie Solo, it is strongly implied that this pansexuality extends to droids via his close relationship with L3-37, his robot companion who later becomes integrated into the Millennium Falcon.

== Portrayal ==
Before Billy Dee Williams was cast as Lando, Yaphet Kotto was considered. When Williams read the script for The Empire Strikes Back, he thought Lando's cape and his surname "Calrissian" would be "interesting things to build a character around."

Megan Farokhmanesh of The Verge noted that while most characters in the films pronounce Han Solo's first name "Hahn" (/hɑːn/), Lando pronounces it "Han" (/hæn/). In Solo: A Star Wars Story, Donald Glover deliberately used "Han" instead of "Hahn" for consistency.

When Donald Glover sought Williams' advice about playing Lando for Solo, Williams told him, "Just be charming", which Glover felt was "the best advice".

== Appearances ==
=== Film ===
==== Original trilogy ====
Lando Calrissian first appears in The Empire Strikes Back as an old friend of Han Solo. He is the previous owner of Han's ship, the Millennium Falcon, and he is the administrator of Cloud City. When Han, Princess Leia, Chewbacca, and C-3PO arrive at Cloud City, Lando welcomes them as guests, but soon betrays them to Darth Vader, who plans to use the group as bait to ensnare Luke Skywalker. Lando reveals later that he had reluctantly agreed to betray them after Vader threatened to put Cloud City under Imperial control if he refused. Lando allows Vader to freeze Han in carbonite, but when Vader takes Leia and Chewbacca prisoner, his conscience gets the better of him. In the ensuing evacuation of Cloud City, Lando helps the group escape in the Falcon. Soon after, he assists in rescuing Luke from the underside of Cloud City. Afterwards, he promises to help find Han.

In Return of the Jedi, Lando helps Luke rescue Han from the crime lord Jabba the Hutt. Later, Lando is made a general in the Rebel Alliance, and pilots the Millennium Falcon in an attack on the second Death Star.

==== Sequel trilogy ====
Lando did not appear in the first two films of the sequel trilogy—The Force Awakens and The Last Jedi—which displeased some fans, according to The Independent. (Note: Attributed to multiple references:) Rian Johnson, the director of The Last Jedi, considered including Lando as the codebreaker that Resistance members Finn and Rose Tico search for, but ultimately decided against it. Lando eventually appeared in the third film, The Rise of Skywalker. In the film, he helps Rey and her companions in their search for a Sith wayfinder, and later recruits fighters from across the galaxy to aid the Resistance in their battle on Exegol.

=== Solo: A Star Wars Story ===
Donald Glover portrays a younger Lando in the 2018 standalone film Solo: A Star Wars Story, which takes place roughly thirteen years before The Empire Strikes Back. (Note: Attributed to multiple references:) In the film, Lando is introduced as a gambler and semi-retired smuggler who owns a fast ship, the Millennium Falcon. Needing a ship to steal a load of starship fuel, Han tries to win the Falcon from Lando in a game of sabacc, but Lando cheats and beats Han. However, Lando agrees to join Han's mission in exchange for a percentage of the profits. During the heist and subsequent escape, Lando is injured. He abandons Han's group, but Han tracks him down and wins the Falcon from him.

In December 2020, Disney said it was developing a streaming series featuring Lando. In July 2023, it was reported that Glover would reprise the Lando role, and would co-write the series with his brother Stephen. In September of that year, it was announced that the project would be a feature film.

=== Television series ===
Billy Dee Williams reprised the role of Lando in the Star Wars Rebels episodes "Idiot's Array" and "The Siege of Lothal". In "Idiot's Array", Lando wins Chopper, the repair droid of the crew of the Ghost, in a game of sabacc, forcing the crew to assist him with a dangerous smuggling run to get their droid back. The crew become Lando's reluctant business partners following the ordeal, leading to their first encounter with the crime boss Azmorigan. In "The Siege of Lothal", the crew of the Ghost approach Lando for help in getting off of Lothal, which is under Imperial occupation. Lando is also mentioned in various other episodes, and becomes an alias used by Ezra Bridger.

=== Video games ===
Lando appears in various video games, including as a playable character in Star Wars Battlefront and Star Wars Battlefront II. In Star Wars: Outlaws (2024), which is set between The Empire Strikes Back and Return of the Jedi, Lando is depicted as a charismatic, smooth-talking gambler and entrepreneur. He interacts with the game's protagonist, Kay Vess, providing assistance and engaging in several missions. Lando is voiced by Lindsay Owen Pierre in Outlaws.

Lando was added to Fortnite on May 3rd 2024 as a buyable character in the item shop.

=== Comics ===
Lando appears in three comic miniseries: Lando (2015), which is set shortly before the original trilogy; Shattered Empire (2015), which takes place after the original trilogy; and Lando: Double or Nothing (2018), which is set just before Solo: A Star Wars Story.

The 2020 relaunch of Marvel's Star Wars series, picking up at the tail end of The Empire Strikes Back, reveals that Lando returns to Cloud City to retrieve his aide Lobot and help Luke look for his lightsaber.

=== Novels ===
The novel Star Wars: Last Shot reveals that between Return of the Jedi and The Force Awakens, Lando considers settling down with a Twi'lek girlfriend.

== Star Wars Legends ==
Following the acquisition of Lucasfilm by The Walt Disney Company in 2012, most of the licensed Star Wars novels and comics produced between 1977 and 2014 were rebranded as Star Wars Legends and declared non-canon to the franchise. (Note: Attributed to multiple references:) The Legends works comprise a separate narrative universe.

Lando is featured in the Star Wars comic book series released by Marvel Comics. In the series, Lando's nemesis is the crime lord Drebble. Lando uses Drebble's name as a cover identity, so that any animosity towards Lando will be brought against Drebble. This scheme backfires when the exploits of Lando-as-Drebble are honored by the Rebellion, which results in Lando presenting an award to Drebble for Lando's own activities.

Lando is a supporting character in Legends novels that are set after Return of the Jedi. These novels, which include Timothy Zahn's Thrawn trilogy and the works of Kevin J. Anderson, frequently depict Lando getting involved in a variety of entrepreneurial schemes. In The Corellian Trilogy, Lando goes on a galaxy-wide hunt for a wealthy wife, ultimately marrying Tendra Risant. With his in-laws' money and his entrepreneurial abilities, he opens a mining facility on the Outer Rim planet of Dubrillion. In The New Jedi Order and beyond, Lando continues to be a valuable ally and friend to the Skywalker-Solo family. In Fury, the seventh novel of the Legacy of the Force series, Lando announces to Han and Leia that he and Tendra are having a child.

According to Anderson, Lucasfilm considered killing off Lando at one point.

=== The Lando Calrissian Adventures ===
Cover art for a volume containing all three novels in the Lando Calrissian Adventures series

The Lando Calrissian Adventures is a 1983 trilogy of science fiction novels by L. Neil Smith. The novels chronicle Lando's smuggling days before the events of the original Star Wars trilogy. The trilogy, which has been described as "space pulp", highlights the differences between Lando and Han Solo. The novels were released in July, October, and December 1983, and were originally published by Del Rey, a division of Ballantine Books.

Lando Calrissian and the Mindharp of Sharu is the first novel in the trilogy, published on July 1, 1983. It has been described as a psychedelic fantasy novel. The story begins shortly after Lando wins the Millennium Falcon, along with a droid, in a game of sabacc. Arriving on the planet Rafa IV to pick up the droid, Lando witnesses convicts harvesting mind-draining crystals which prolong the life of elite citizens. Lando is arrested and brought before the sorcerer Rokur Gepta, who offers to spare his life if he can locate the legendary Mindharp of the lost Sharu civilization. Lando Calrissian and the Mindharp of Sharu is referenced in the novelization of Solo: A Star Wars Story.

The second novel in the trilogy, Lando Calrissian and the Flamewind of Oseon, was published on October 1, 1983. After selling a load of life-crystals, and accompanied by his droid Vuffi Raa, Lando attempts a career as an honest freighter captain. After some bad luck, he becomes nostalgic for his old smuggling trade. He is invited to a sabacc game on the planet Oseon, and is followed by Rokur Gepta. During the game, Lando is assaulted. He is put on trial for carrying a weapon, which is illegal on Oseon. He is offered a smuggling deal as an alternative to execution.

The third novel, Lando Calrissian and the Starcave of ThonBoka, was published on December 1, 1983. Nearly a year after leaving the Oseon system, Lando and Raa encounter the vacuum-breathing creature Lehesu, who hails from the ThonBoka nebula. A month later, Lando and Raa receive word that ThonBoka is under attack by the Empire. They rush to Lehesu's aid, and engage the Imperial forces in battle.

=== Video games ===
Billy Dee Williams voices Lando in Star Wars: Jedi Knight II: Jedi Outcast, in which Lando assists Kyle Katarn and helps him reach Bespin. Lando is also a playable character in Lego Star Wars: The Complete Saga.

== Reception ==
In a 1980 review of The Empire Strikes Back, Janet Maslin of The New York Times called Lando "exaggeratedly unctuous, untrustworthy and loaded with jive." In contrast, Adilufu Nama wrote in 2008 that Lando "offered a new benchmark in the status of black representation in science fiction cinema". Writing in 2015, Alyssa Rosenberg of The Washington Post felt that Lando is a "fascinating and fraught part of the 'Star Wars' legacy and the conversation around race in science fiction". She claimed that Lando is the only Star Wars character with a "truly comfortable sense of style", and felt that when Williams appears as Lando in the original trilogy, he feels like "an old-fashioned movie star in a futuristic setting without making the performance seem incongruous."

Williams received backlash from children who were angered by Lando's betrayal of Han in Empire; Williams thought viewers' reactions would have been different if Lando was white. Williams has claimed that Lando did not really betray Han, but rather "was dealing, as best he could, with a situation that was presented to him by the Empire upon their arrival". Williams wrote that "Lando is not black or white, he's just Lando. Above and beyond the arguments or discussions of bygone eras, he is of the future."

Megan Farokhmanesh of The Verge called Jonathan Kasdan's assertion that Lando is pansexual as "a piss-poor shot at representation", and argued that Kasdan was conflating pansexuality with promiscuity. Farokhmanesh compared Kasdan's statement to J. K. Rowling's revelation that her character Albus Dumbledore is gay, despite the fact that his sexuality had never been discussed in any Harry Potter media.
