= Millennium Falcon =

Fictional starship in the Star Wars franchise

- Star Wars vehicle
- The Millennium Falcon as seen in Star Wars (1977).
- First appearance: Star Wars: From the Adventures of Luke Skywalker (1976 novelization)
- Last appearance: Star Wars: The Rise of Skywalker (2019)
- Created by: George Lucas
- Designed by: Joe Johnston

Information
- Affiliation: Lando Calrissian; Han Solo; Chewbacca; Gannis Ducain; Vanver and Toursant Irving; Unkar Plutt; Rey
- Made by: Corellian Engineering Corporation
- Auxiliary vehicles: YT Dart spacetug (under Lando); Five Model CEC Class-1s escape pods

General characteristics
- Class: YT-1300F light freighter / smuggling ship
- Armaments: 2x Arakyd Tomral RM-76 heavy laser cannons (under Lando); 2× CEC AG2G quad-bolt cannons (ventral and dorsal); 8× Arakyd ST2 concussion missile racks; BlasTech Ax-108 "Ground Buzzer" blaster cannon; Tractor beam projectors
- Defenses: Duralloy plating; 1× ray shield generators (stern); Torplex deflector shield projector; Nordoxicon Unlimited Anti-concussion field generator; 1× force shield generators (bow); Novaldex stasis-type shield generator; Kuat Drive Yards deflector shield projector; Signal jammer; Carbanti 29L electromagnetic countermeasures package
- Maximum speed: 1050 km/h (652 mph; maximum earth-like atmospheric speed); 75 MGLT (megalight per hour; subluminal speed); 0.5 HCR Blackmarket Drive (hyperdrive class rating; superluminal speed); 10.0 HCR Stock Back-up Drive
- Propulsion: Sublight engine thrusters (10×); 60 degree turn rate per second (atmospheric); 90 degree roll rate per second (atmospheric)
- Power: Girodyne SRB42 sublight engines; Rippinnium Quadex Power Core (subluminal); Class 0.5 Coaxium Isu-Sim SSP05 Hyperdrive (superluminal)
- Length: 34.75 metres (114.0 ft)
- Height: 7.8 metres (26 ft)
- Population volume: 2 pilot/co-pilot; 2 gunners; 6-30 passengers (modular configuration); 100 metric tons cargo

The Millennium Falcon is a fictional starship in the Star Wars franchise. Designed by Joe Johnston for the film Star Wars (1977), (Note: Later titled Star Wars: Episode IV – A New Hope) it has subsequently appeared in The Star Wars Holiday Special (1978), The Empire Strikes Back (1980), Return of the Jedi (1983), Revenge of the Sith (2005), The Force Awakens (2015), The Last Jedi (2017), Solo: A Star Wars Story (2018), and The Rise of Skywalker (2019). Additionally, the Falcon appears in a variety of Star Wars spin-off works, including books, comics, and games; James Luceno's novel Millennium Falcon focuses on the titular ship. It also appears in the 2014 animated film The Lego Movie in Lego form.

The ship, a YT-1300 Corellian light freighter, is primarily commanded by smuggler Han Solo and his Wookiee first mate, Chewbacca, and was previously owned by gambler/con-artist Lando Calrissian. Solo: A Star Wars Story depicts the ship as being co-piloted by, and later integrated with, Calrissian's droid L3-37. Described as being one of the fastest vessels in the Star Wars canon, the Millennium Falcon looks worn-out, but despite its humble origins and shabby exterior, it has played a critical role in some of the greatest victories of the Rebel Alliance and the New Republic.

== Origin and design ==
The ship originally had a more elongated appearance, but this design's similarity to the Eagle Transporters in Space: 1999 prompted George Lucas to change the Falcon's design. The original model was modified, re-scaled, and used as Princess Leia's ship, Tantive IV. Modelmaker Joe Johnston had about four weeks to redesign the Falcon, and Lucas' only suggestion to Johnston was to "think of a flying saucer". Johnston did not want to produce a "basic flying saucer", so he created the offset cockpit, forward cargo mandibles, and rear slot for the engines. It was also said that the shape of the ship was roughly based on a hamburger with an olive-on-the-side cockpit. The design was simple enough to create in the four-week window. Johnston called production of the new Falcon design one of his most intense projects.

The sound of the ship traveling through hyperspace comes from two tracks of the engine noise of a McDonnell Douglas DC-9, with one track slightly out of synchronization with the other to introduce a phasing effect. To this, sound designer Ben Burtt added the hum of the cooling fans on the motion-control rig at Industrial Light & Magic (ILM).

It has been noted that the cockpit with its greenhouse-style window was likely inspired by the cockpit of the American B-29 Superfortress.

=== Models and sets ===
Harrison Ford and Peter Mayhew in the cockpit of the Millennium Falcon during the making of a scene from the Star Wars Holiday Special

Visually, the Millennium Falcon was represented by several models and external and internal sets. For Star Wars, a partial exterior set was constructed and the set dressed as Mos Eisley's Docking Bay 94 and the Death Star hangar. Besides the functional landing gear, an additional support held up the structure and was disguised as a fuel line. The interior set included the starboard ring corridor, the boarding ramp, cockpit access tunnel, gun turret ladder, secret compartments, and the forward hold. The cockpit was constructed as a separate set that could be rocked when the ship was supposed to shake. Several inconsistencies exist between the internal set and the external set, the cockpit access tunnel angle being the most noticeable.

The effects models for Star Wars matched the design of the exterior set. The primary model was five feet long and detailed with various kit parts. The ship was represented by a matte painting when Princess Leia sees it for the first time, showing the full upper surface. For the 1997 "Special Edition", a digital model replaces the effects model in several shots, and is used in a new shot of the Falcon lifting off from Docking Bay 94.

For The Empire Strikes Back (1980), a new external set was constructed. In spring 1979, Marcon Fabrications, a heavy engineering firm that served the UK's petrochemical and oil industries, was hired to build a movable full-scale external model capable of "moving as if it were about to take off." Built in secrecy under the project code name Magic Roundabout, the company leased the 1930s Western Sunderland Flying Boat hangar in Pembroke Dock, West Wales. The model, which took three months to construct, weighed over 25 long tons (25 t), measured 65 feet (20 m) in diameter and 20 feet (6.1 m) high, and used compressed air hover pads for up to 1.5 inches (38 mm) of hover-height movement around the set. It was then disassembled and shipped to Elstree Studios, Hertfordshire, for filming. Today, the Pembroke Dock museum has an exhibit about the project.

Along with the full-size mock-up of the Falcon, a new miniature model was created for The Empire Strikes Back to allow ILM to film more intricate in-flight rolls and pitches that were not possible with the five-foot model. This model was able to be mounted on a gimbal that allowed ILM to simulate very difficult maneuvers as the ship attempted to outrun Imperial TIE fighters during the asteroid-field-escape scene from the film. The new model, which measured at approximately 32 inches in length, had several surface features that differed from the five-foot model, including an updated landing gear and different surface greebles. The 32" model was the version of the Millennium Falcon most depicted in toys, model kits, and promotional materials for the Star Wars universe prior to the release of the sequel trilogy. The model was reused for Return of the Jedi (1983). At the end of this production, the model was destroyed.

As in Star Wars, the location set was changed around the ship set. The only major design change was to add a landing gear where the disguised fuel line had been in Star Wars. This set included the port side, giving the set seven landing gears. The internal set was slightly refitted from A New Hope and featured a sliding cockpit door, a larger cargo hold, an additional corridor to port, and an equipment room. The cockpit was rebuilt slightly larger to allow more actors to fit comfortably; shots were apparently slightly cropped in later releases of the film to hide this alteration. Two new interior sets were created that are not shown to connect to the rest of the set: a top hatch that Lando Calrissian (Billy Dee Williams) uses to rescue Luke Skywalker (Mark Hamill), and the compartment where Luke rests on a bunk.

The 5-foot-long (1.5 m) effects model from Star Wars was modified to reflect the additional landing gear, and several new models were built, including one roughly the size of a U.S. quarter dollar. For the 1997 Special Edition, a CGI model replaced the effects model during the approach and landing on Cloud City.

No new models or sets were created for Return of the Jedi. A portion of the full-scale ship was used for a scene cut from the film in which several characters board the Falcon in a sandstorm on Tatooine. In the scene when Han exacts a promise from Lando not to damage the Falcon, the Falcon is represented by a backdrop painting. It is also in a matte painting of the entire hangar bay.

The internal and external sets were scrapped after filming on Return of the Jedi ended. The effects models were kept by Lucasfilm and some have been on display from time to time.

A digital version of the Falcon appears briefly on Coruscant in Revenge of the Sith (2005). Lucas has confirmed that the ship is the Falcon and not another ship of similar design. A CGI version of the vessel also appears in the Disney attraction Star Tours: The Adventures Continue.

On June 3, 2014, TMZ confirmed that the Falcon would return for Star Wars: The Force Awakens when it leaked a photo from the set of the film, showing a full-scale version of the Falcon being built. An effects shot of the Falcon appears in the teaser trailer for The Force Awakens, released on November 28, 2014. This version of the ship is a digital recreation of the original 1977 five-foot model, with additional detailing reflecting the passage of time. The most noticeable change is the rectangular sensor array above the top hull, which replaces the circular dish from the first three films.

On April 16, 2021, concept artist Phil Saunders shared some abandoned concept art, and revealed that Judi Dench was considered for a role in Star Wars: The Rise of Skywalker as the original designer of the Millennium Falcon.

== Depiction ==
What a piece of junk!

— Luke Skywalker, A New Hope

You came in that thing? You’re braver than I thought.

— Leia Organa, A New Hope

Han Solo won the Millennium Falcon from Lando Calrissian in the card game sabacc several years before the events of the original Star Wars film (A New Hope).

In A New Hope, Obi-Wan Kenobi and Luke Skywalker charter the ship in the Mos Eisley cantina to deliver them, C-3PO, R2-D2, and the stolen Death Star plans to Alderaan. When the Falcon is captured by the Death Star, the group conceal themselves in smuggling compartments built into the floor to avoid detection during a search of the ship. The group eventually escapes aboard the Falcon after rescuing Princess Leia. Solo later collects his fee for delivering them to the hidden Rebel base on Yavin IV and departs under bitter circumstances, but returns to assist Luke in destroying the Death Star.

Solo pilots the Falcon, with Chewbacca, Leia, and C-3PO aboard, to elude the Imperial fleet in The Empire Strikes Back, which is a notable struggle due to a damaged hyperdrive. They take refuge at Cloud City, where Darth Vader captures Solo after Boba Fett tracks them there. Lando Calrissian helps the others escape, with R2-D2 successfully repairing the ship's hyperdrive. At the film's end, he departs in the Falcon to track down Solo and his captor, Jabba the Hutt. Calrissian again captains the Falcon during the climax of Return of the Jedi, with Nien Nunb as co-pilot, to destroy the second Death Star. Before the second Death Star is destroyed, Lando accidentally damages the ship by hitting the circular sensor rectenna dish on a random pipe or circuit in the second Death Star. Regardless, Lando and the others successfully destroy the Galactic Empire.

In Star Wars: The Force Awakens, set some 30 years after Return of the Jedi, the Falcon is in the possession of a scrap dealer named Unkar Plutt on the desert planet Jakku, having been stolen from Solo and Chewbacca some years prior. Scavenger Rey and former stormtrooper Finn steal the Falcon in order to escape from an attack by the First Order, having been targeted for having the droid BB-8 in their possession. They are captured by a smuggling freighter, which turns out to be piloted by Solo and Chewbacca, who reclaim the Falcon. Forced to escape in the Falcon from an ambush by parties to whom Solo is heavily in debt, Solo reluctantly agrees to help Rey and Finn return BB-8 to the Resistance. After Rey is captured by the First Order, Solo agrees to take Finn in the Falcon to the First Order's new Starkiller Base—a planet that has been converted into the next generation of 'Death Star'—by attempting a risky maneuver of bypassing the planet's defenses by exiting hyperspace in its atmosphere. When Solo is killed by his son, the rebels escape the destructing Starkiller Base. Later, Rey uses a newly-assembled map to travel to Ahch-To, the site of the first Jedi temple, to make contact with the long-lost Luke Skywalker, traveling in the Falcon in the company of Chewbacca and R2-D2.

The Falcon appears again in Star Wars: The Last Jedi, still on Ahch-To with Rey and Chewbacca. Rey uses the Falcon's escape pod to board Supreme Leader Snoke's flagship, the Mega-class Star Dreadnought Supremacy. Director Rian Johnson noted that he wanted its design to resemble a coffin, inspired by C.S. Lewis' Perelandra. The escape pod was monogrammed to say "Property of Han Solo". Later in the film, Chewbacca and Rey take the Falcon to the planet Crait, where the Resistance is under attack by the First Order. The Falcon loses its sensor dish for the third time on Crait, after it is shot off by a TIE fighter, but still manages to single-handedly take out most of the First Order's fighters on the planet while Luke distracts Kylo Ren. After the battle, all surviving Resistance personnel leave Crait aboard the Falcon.

In the film Solo: A Star Wars Story, it is revealed that Lando modified the Falcon by putting an escape pod between the frontal 'mandibles', which Han jettisons to escape a gravity well. This film ends with the game of sabacc where Han won the Falcon from Lando.

In The Rise of Skywalker the Falcon is piloted by Lando, Chewbacca and Wedge Antilles in the final battle of Exegol, leading the entire fleet of free worlds against the Sith Eternal forces.

=== Kessel Run ===
In the initial film, Solo brags that the Falcon "made the Kessel Run in less than twelve parsecs". (Note: In the pre-release novelization, the line is: "less than twelve standard timeparts".) As the parsec is a unit of distance, not time, different explanations have been provided. In the fourth draft of the script, Kenobi "reacts to Solo's stupid attempt to impress them with obvious misinformation." Lucas acknowledged the misnomer in 1977, saying that Han modified "the navigational system to get through hyperspace in the shortest possible distance". On the film's DVD audio commentary, Lucas further explained that in the Star Wars universe, traveling through hyperspace requires careful navigation to avoid stars, planets, asteroids, and other obstacles, and that is because no long-distance journey can be made in a straight line, the "fastest" ship is the one that can plot the "most direct course", thereby traveling the least distance.

In The Force Awakens, Rey references the Kessel Run but describes it as being completed in fourteen parsecs, after which Solo corrects her.

In Solo: A Star Wars Story, Solo's Kessel Run is depicted in detail, providing an explanation for the "twelve parsec" boast. Solo has to make many calculated jumps to avoid killing the crew. After integrating the memory module of Lando's damaged L3 droid into the ship's navigation, Solo is able to take a "shortcut" (which is dangerously close to a black hole). Chewbacca indicates the real distance was closer to 13 parsecs, but Solo insists, "Not if you round down," implying that the claim of "less than twelve parsecs" is slightly exaggerated.

=== Ownership ===
The Falcon has been depicted many times in the franchise, and its ownership and command have changed several times.

- During the events of Revenge of the Sith, the Falcon, then named the Stellar Envoy, was owned by the Republic Group. Following the end of the Clone Wars and the formation of the Galactic Empire, the Envoy was refurbished and passed between multiple owners until it ended up in Lando Calrissian's possession, where it was renamed the Millennium Falcon.
- Prior to A New Hope, the Falcon was in the possession of Lando Calrissian. He lost it to Han Solo in payment of a gambling debt. This is depicted in Solo: A Star Wars Story, as well as the integration of Lando's droid L3-37 with the ship's computer.
- After Solo's capture by the Empire in The Empire Strikes Back, Lando, Chewbacca, and Leia take possession of the Falcon. In the intervening year prior to Return of the Jedi, Leia commandeers the Falcon for the Alliance.
- During Return of the Jedi, Solo leaves Tatooine aboard the Millennium Falcon, and on arrival at the rendezvous for the Rebel fleet he lends the Falcon to Calrissian, who pilots it during the Battle of Endor and the destruction of the second Death Star.
- After the events of Return of the Jedi, the Falcon is stolen from Solo, ending up on the planet Jakku under the ownership of a scrap dealer, Unkar Plutt, 30 years after the Battle of Endor. In The Force Awakens, Rey and Finn commandeer the ship to escape the planet, only to be found by Solo and Chewbacca, who immediately reclaim the ship.
- After the death of Solo, Rey pilots the Falcon, with Chewbacca as her co-pilot. The novelization of The Force Awakens states that Chewbacca willingly abdicates captaincy of the Falcon to Rey.
- After the events of The Last Jedi, the ship becomes the base of operations for the remaining members of the Resistance.
- In the intro of The Rise of Skywalker, Poe Dameron briefly pilots the Falcon during a mission to the Sinta Glacier Colony to meet a Resistance informant, heavily damaging it by performing risky hyperspace jumps while evading the First Order. During the Battle of Exegol in the film's climax, the Falcon is again piloted by Lando Calrissian with Chewbacca.

== Cultural influence ==
Joss Whedon credits the Millennium Falcon as one of his two primary inspirations for his Firefly television show. The Falcon and the Falcon's distinct shape appear in Star Trek: First Contact, Blade Runner, Spaceballs, and Starship Troopers. The manga series Berserk includes a Millennium Falcon arc.

Similar to how Jack Sparrow from the Pirates of the Caribbean franchise was compared to Han Solo, the Black Pearl was compared to the Millennium Falcon. For the film series, it was said at least once by James Ward Byrkit, a creative consultant of Gore Verbinski's Pirates trilogy, in the Disney+ series Prop Culture. A. C. Crispin spoke of how she was privileged to write the scene where Han first beheld—and fell for—the Millennium Falcon in The Han Solo Trilogy, and assured fans it was every bit as thrilling to write the scene with Jack Sparrow and the merchant ship Wicked Wench when releasing the fifth excerpt of Pirates of the Caribbean: The Price of Freedom.

SpaceX states that their launch vehicles (except Starship) are named after the Millennium Falcon.

The United States Air Force named the first of their software factories Kessel Run for the way they intended to "smuggle" in agile software development techniques and set speed records.

=== Biology ===
The middle Cambrian arthropod Cambroraster falcatus is named after the Millennium Falcon.

=== Toys ===
Kenner, Hasbro, Steel Tec, Master Replicas, Code 3 Collectibles and Micro Machines have all released Millennium Falcon toys and puzzles, including a Transformers version of the ship.

Hot Wheels has made a model of the ship for their Star Wars starship line and a version of it as a car. It is also available as a Hot Wheels playset.

Lego has released multiple versions of the Millennium Falcon in varying sizes. The 5,195-piece Lego model (part of the Star Wars "Ultimate Collectors Series") was physically the largest Lego set sold by the company, until it was topped in 2008 by the Lego Taj Mahal. In September 2017, Lego released an updated Millennium Falcon set in the Star Wars "Ultimate Collectors Series". With the new interior and more details compared to the 2007 model, the 7,541-piece model is the most expensive commercially available Lego set. Lego has also made a version of the Falcon to tie in with Solo: A Star Wars Story. It is called the Kessel Run Millennium Falcon. A version called The Dark Falcon features alternate characters such as Darth Jar Jar and Jedi Vader, showing the Millennium Falcon with black coloring.

== Theme park attractions ==
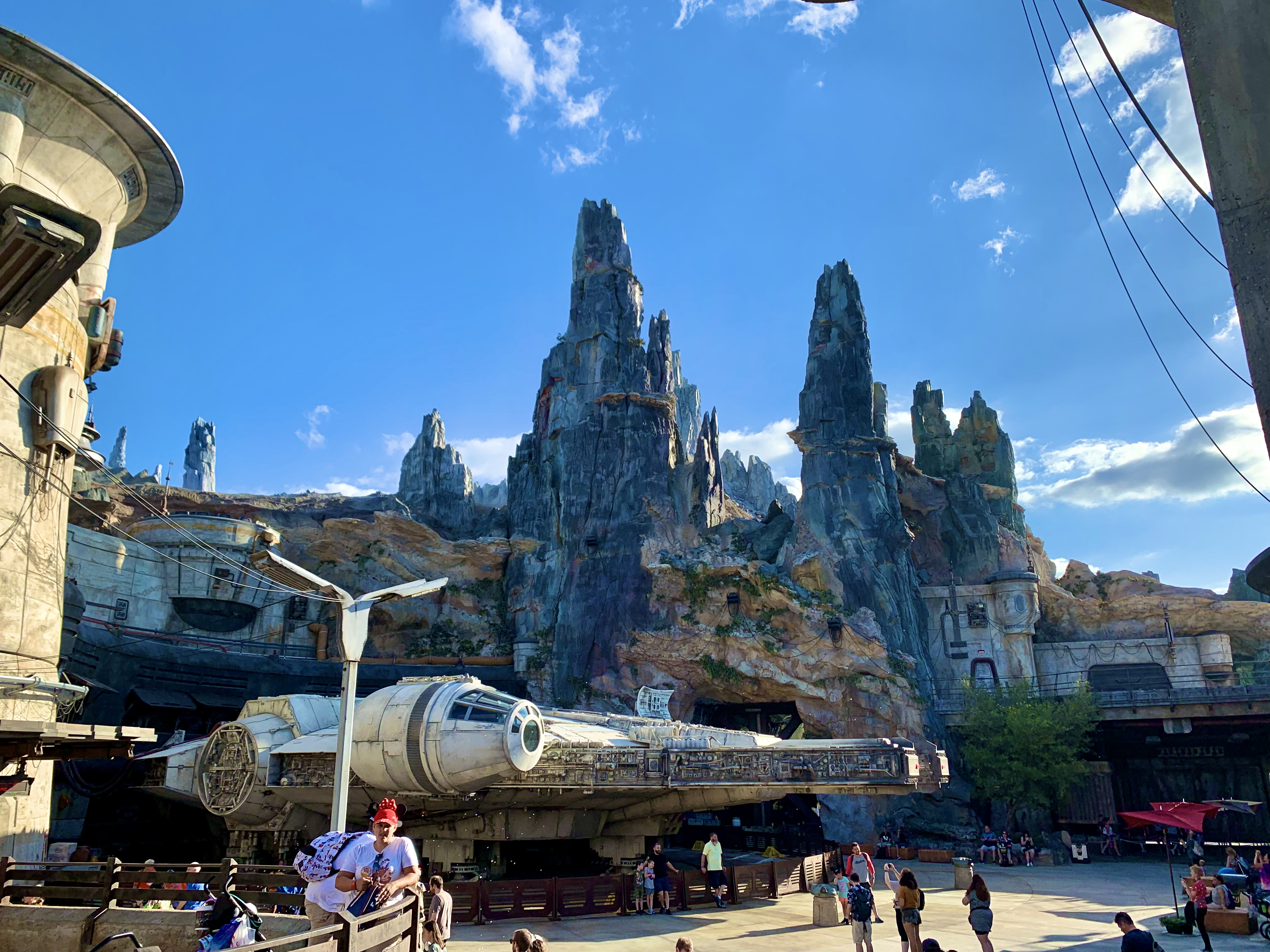
The Millennium Falcon in Star Wars: Galaxy's Edge at Disney's Hollywood Studios

On May 31, 2019, a full sized replica of the Falcon was opened to the public along with the rest of Star Wars: Galaxy's Edge at Disneyland in Anaheim, California, along with a flight simulator attraction, Star Wars: Millennium Falcon – Smugglers Run, in which riders take control of the Falcon from inside its cockpit. An identical version of the attraction opened on August 29, 2019, at Disney's Hollywood Studios at the Walt Disney World Resort in Orlando, Florida.

== See also ==
- List of Star Wars spacecraft
