= Star Wars (disambiguation) =

Star Wars is an epic science fantasy saga created by George Lucas.

Star Wars may also refer to:

== Film and associated music ==
- Star Wars (film), 1977 film, also known as Star Wars: Episode IV – A New Hope
  - Star Wars (soundtrack)
  - "Star Wars (Main Title)", the musical theme of the film

== Literature ==
- Star Wars comics, adaptations by Marvel Comics and Dark Horse Comics
  - Star Wars (1977 comic book), Marvel Comics comic book series 1977–1986, with a one-shot issue 2019
  - Star Wars (2013 comic book), by Dark Horse Comics
  - Star Wars (2015 comic book), by Marvel Comics
  - Star Wars (comic strip), a newspaper comic strip 1979–1984
  - Star Wars (manga), adaptations of the first four films
  - Star Wars (UK comics), by Titan Magazines
- Star Wars: From the Adventures of Luke Skywalker, 1976 novelization of the 1977 film
- Star Wars (radio series), adaptations of the original trilogy produced in 1981, 1983, and 1996

== Gaming ==
=== Arcade games ===
- Star Wars (1983 video game)
- Star Wars (1992 pinball)
- Star Wars Arcade, 1993, originally released as Star Wars

=== Console games ===
- Star Wars (1987 video game)
- Star Wars (1991 video game)
- Super Star Wars, 1992
- Monopoly Star Wars, 1997
- Kinect Star Wars, 2012
- Angry Birds Star Wars, 2012

=== Role-playing games ===
- Star Wars: The Roleplaying Game, 1987–1999
- Star Wars Roleplaying Game (Wizards of the Coast), 2000–2010
- Star Wars Roleplaying Game (Fantasy Flight Games), 2012–2019

=== Other games ===
- Star Wars video games
- Star Wars Customizable Card Game, 1995–2001
- Star Wars: The Interactive Video Board Game, 1996
- Star Wars Trading Card Game, 2002–2005
- Star Wars: The Card Game, 2012–2018
- Starwars (board game), 1977

== Merchandise ==
- Lego Star Wars, a Lego theme
- Star Wars: The Vintage Collection, a line of action figures
- Star Wars: The Black Series, a toy line

== Music ==
- Patrick Gleeson's Star Wars, a 1977 album by Patrick Gleeson
- Star Wars and Other Galactic Funk, a 1977 studio album by Meco
  - "Star Wars Theme/Cantina Band", a track from the album
- Music from Star Wars, a 1977 album by the Electric Moog Orchestra, published by Musicor Records
- Star Wars, a 1977 single by René Joly (singer)
- Star Wars and Other Space Themes, a 1978 album by Geoff Love and His Orchestra
- Star Wars, a 1978 album by Ferrante & Teicher
- Star Wars, a 1978 album by Kid Stuff Records
- Star Wars, a 1978 album by Osamu Tokaibayashi
- Star Wars/Close Encounters, a 1978 album by Richard "Groove" Holmes
- Star Wars: The Music of John Williams and Other Composers, a 1989 album by Richard Hayman with the Philharmonic Rock Orchestra
- Star Wars, a 1991 album by BMX Bandits
- Star Wars (Wilco album), 2015
- "Star Wars", a song from the Hindi version of the 1990 film Anjali
- "Star Wars", a 1978 single by Masato Shimon
- "Star Wars" (Kelis song), 2001
- "Star Wars Gangsta Rap", a 2000 parody song based on Star Wars

== Television ==
- Star Wars (Indian TV series), a Tamil reality TV show

=== Episodes ===
- "Star Wars", Cake Wars season 2, episode 1 (2016)
- "Star Wars", Cold War episode 22 (1999)
- "Star Wars", Cupcake Wars season 6, episode 13 (2012)
- "Star Wars", Disney's Magic Bake-Off episode 10 (2021)
- "Star Wars", Gary: Tank Commander series 2, episode 6 (2011)
- "Star Wars", Grosse Pointe episode 11 (2000)
- "Star Wars", Jessie season 1, episode 9 (2012)
- "Star Wars", Lego Masters (American) season 1, episode 9 (2020)
- "Star Wars", Second City Television season 3, episode 13 (1980)
- "Star Wars", The Toys That Made Us season 1, episode 1 (2017)

== Other uses ==
- Strategic Defense Initiative, nicknamed Star Wars, a proposed American missile defense system from 1983
- Star Wars: Where Science Meets Imagination, a traveling exhibition of the Museum of Science, Boston
- Star Wars: In Concert, a series of concerts since 2009
- Star Wars: A Galactic Spectacular, a nighttime show at Walt Disney World
- Star Wars: Force for Change, a Star Wars-themed charity program since 2014

== Topics ==
- Architecture of Star Wars
- Changes in Star Wars re-releases
- Comparison of Star Trek and Star Wars
- Cultural impact of Star Wars
- Languages in Star Wars
- Music of Star Wars
- Physics and Star Wars
- Science of Star Wars
- Star Wars fandom
- Star Wars in other media
- Star Wars opening crawl
- Star Wars religion
- Star Wars sources and analogues
- Star Wars trilogy
- Technology in Star Wars
- Universe of Star Wars

== See also ==
- Star Wars Canyon
- Star Wars Galaxy (disambiguation)
- Star Wars Holiday Special, a 1978 television special
- Star Wars Kid, a 2002 viral video by Ghyslain Raza
- Star Wars Theory, a YouTube channel
- Star Wars Uncut, a 2010 online tribute film
- A New Hope (disambiguation), related to Star Wars
- Battle Star Wars, a 2020 mockbuster film from The Asylum
- Bring Back... Star Wars, a 2008 installment of the TV series Bring Back...
- Doraemon: Nobita's Little Star Wars, a 1985 anime film by Tsutomu Shibayama
- Hardware Wars, a 1978 short parody film by Ernie Fosselius
- I've Never Seen Star Wars
- "Phineas and Ferb: Star Wars", a 2014 episode of Phineas and Ferb
- "Robot Chicken: Star Wars", a 2007 episode of Robot Chicken
- Star Dudes, a 2000 animated parody web series
- Star Tours, a former attraction at Disney theme parks based on Star Wars
- Star war, a Mayan conflict of the 1st millennium CE
- Star Warped, a 1997 video game
- "Star Warners", a 1998 episode and the series finale of Pinky and the Brain
- Star Warrior (disambiguation)
- "Star Warts", a 1977 novelty song by Dickie Goodman
- "Tar Wars", a 1994 episode of Mighty Max
- The Making of Star Wars, a 1977 television special
- "The Stars of Star Wars", a 1980 episode of The Muppet Show
- The Story of Star Wars, a 1977 record album
- Wrestling Star Wars
