= Spider-Man: Homecoming (soundtrack) =

Spider-Man: Homecoming (Original Motion Picture Soundtrack)

Soundtrack album by Michael Giacchino
- Released: July 7, 2017
- Genre: Film score
- Length: 66:40
- Label: Sony Masterworks

Michael Giacchino chronology
The Book of Henry (2017)	Spider-Man: Homecoming (Original Motion Picture Soundtrack) (2017)	War for the Planet of the Apes (2017)

Spider-Man: Homecoming (Original Motion Picture Soundtrack) is the film score to the Columbia Pictures / Marvel Studios film Spider-Man: Homecoming composed by Michael Giacchino. The soundtrack album was released by Sony Masterworks on July 7, 2017.

== Background ==
While promoting Doctor Strange in early November 2016, Marvel Studios president Kevin Feige accidentally revealed that Michael Giacchino, who composed the music for that film, would be composing the score for Homecoming as well. Giacchino soon confirmed this himself. Recording for the soundtrack began on April 11, 2017. The score includes the theme from the 1960s cartoon series, which is played during the Marvel Studios logo. The soundtrack was released by Sony Masterworks on July 7, 2017.

== Track listing ==
All tracks are written by Michael Giacchino, except where noted

No.	Title	Writer(s)	Length
1.	"Theme From Spider-Man (Original Television Series)"	Paul Francis Webster; Robert "Bob" Harris	0:39
2.	"The World is Changing" ( (Note: This track references Alan Silvestri's theme from The Avengers.))		4:10
3.	"Academic Decommitment"		1:57
4.	"High Tech Heist"		1:26
5.	"On a Ned-To-Know Basis"		1:45
6.	"Drag Racing / An Old Van Rundown"		4:06
7.	"Webbed Surveillance"		4:40
8.	"No Vault of His Own"		2:27
9.	"Monumental Meltdown"		5:23
10.	"The Baby Monitor Protocol"		1:37
11.	"A Boatload of Trouble Part 1"		3:09
12.	"A Boatload of Trouble Part 2"		2:16
13.	"Ferry Dust Up"		2:50
14.	"Stark Raving Mad"		1:54
15.	"Pop Vulture"		3:05
16.	"Bussed a Move"		1:43
17.	"Lift Off"		5:25
18.	"Fly-By-Night Operation"		2:23
19.	"Vulture Clash"		4:07
20.	"A Stark Contrast"		4:41
21.	"No Frills Proto COOL!"		0:34
22.	"Spider-Man: Homecoming Suite"		6:13
23.	"The Queens Community Bank Jingle" (Hidden track)
24.	"The Real Reason Peter Quit the Band" (Hidden track)
Total length:			66:40

== Charts ==
Chart (2017)	Peak position
Scottish Albums (Official Charts)	96

== Additional music ==
"Blitzkrieg Bop" by the Ramones, "The Underdog" by Spoon, "Can't You Hear Me Knocking" by the Rolling Stones, "The Low Spark of High Heeled Boys" by Traffic, "Save It for Later" by The English Beat and "Space Age Love Song" by A Flock of Seagulls are also featured in the film.
