= Gadrooning =

Decorative pattern formed of a series of convex ridges

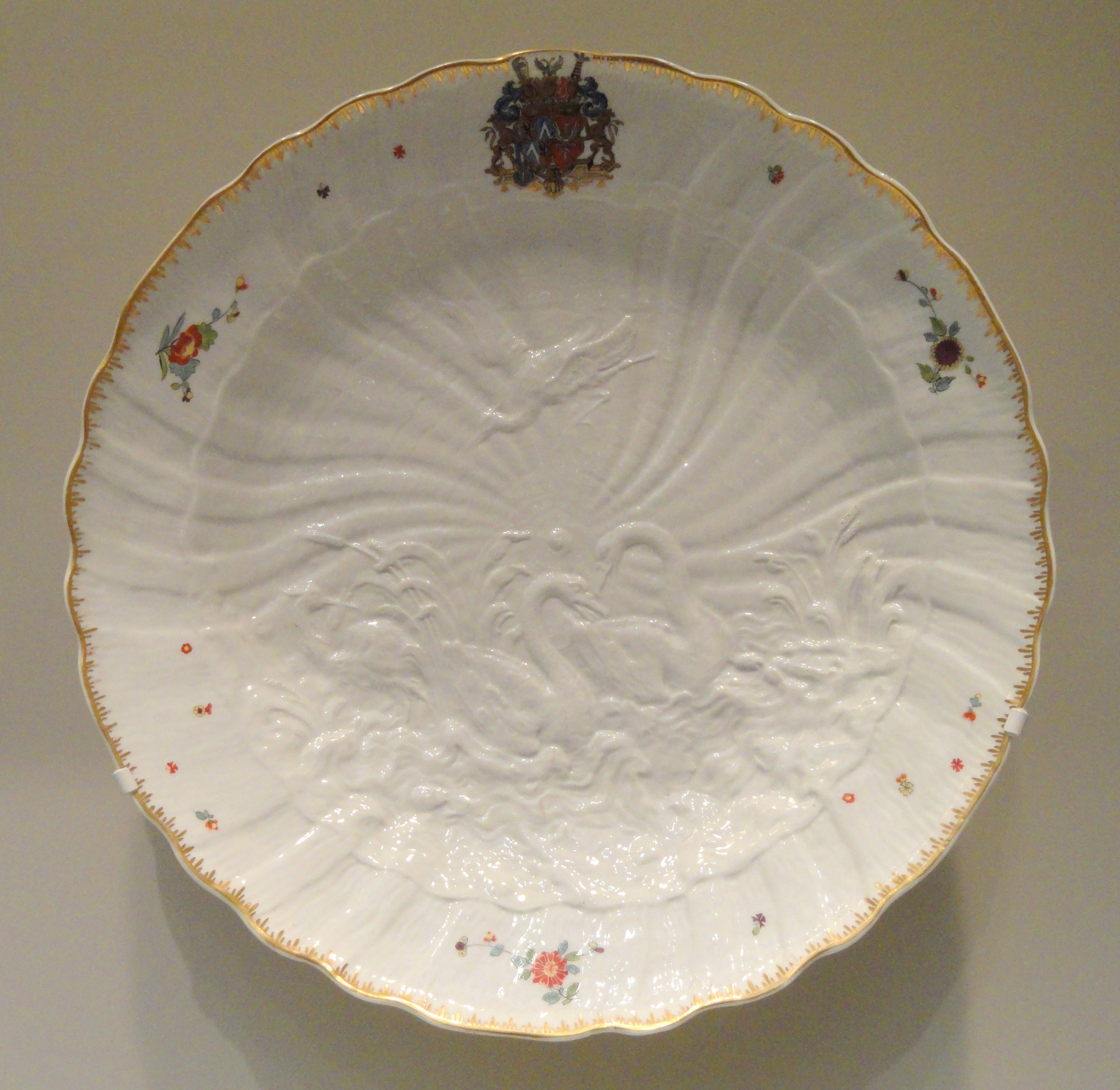
Plate with gadrooned background from the Meissen porcelain Swan Service, ca. 1738

Gadrooning is a decorative motif consisting of convex curving shapes in relief in a series. In furniture and other decorative arts, it is an ornamental carved band of tapered, curving and sometimes alternating concave and convex sections, usually diverging obliquely either side of a central point, often with rounded ends vaguely reminiscent of flower petals. Gadrooning, derived from Roman sarcophagi and other antiquities, was widely used during the Italian Renaissance, and in the classicising phases of 18th- and 19th-century design.

In medieval European metalwork, gadroons on circular dishes are often tapered, ending in a point on a central circular zone, and run diagonally across the surface in a spiral. Similar – but typically not tapered – designs were popular in Rococo porcelain and metalwork. In Renaissance or Neoclassical works, they are normally thinner and straighter.

Gadrooning is also observed on late 17th and 18th century glasses. It is produced with a second gather of glass leading a complex and ornate design due to the added layer of glass. In some cases the gadrooning has a fringe which is drawn out to several points, leading to a flame-like appearance. This is known as flammiform (flamiform, alternative spelling) gadrooning.

== Gallery ==
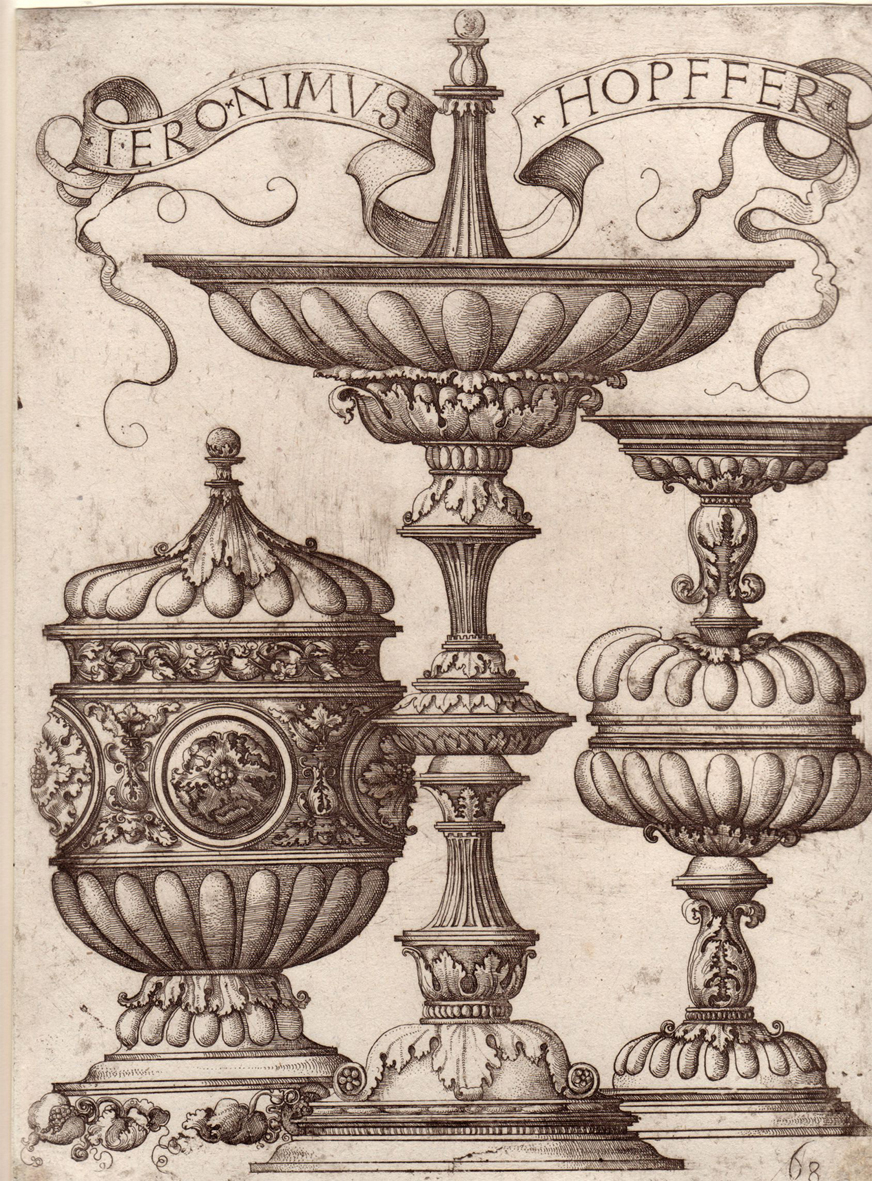
Three Renaissance goblets decorated with gadroonings, 1520-1525

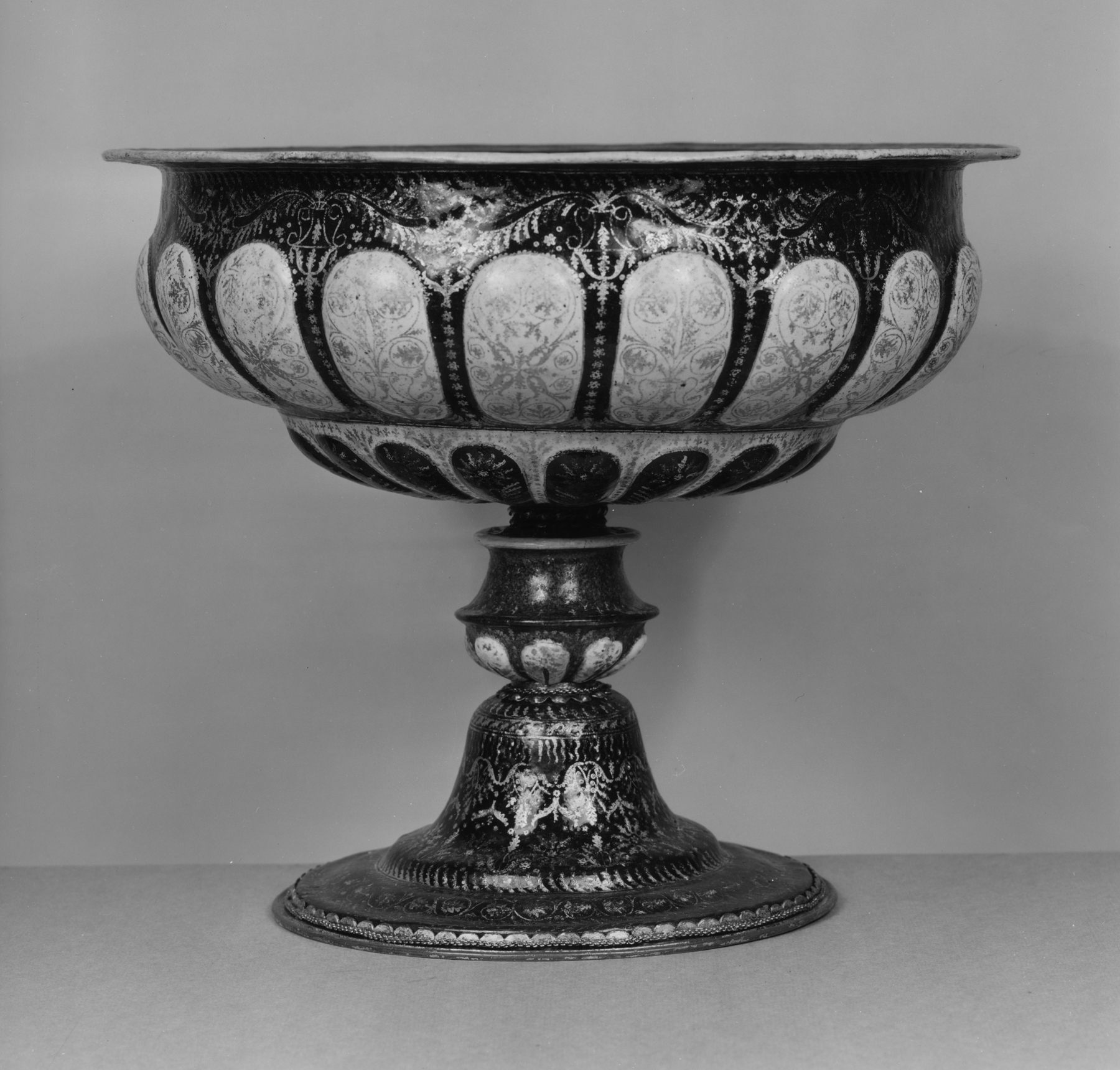
Italian late 16th-century enameled copper footed bowl, with several registers of gadrooning (Walters Art Museum)

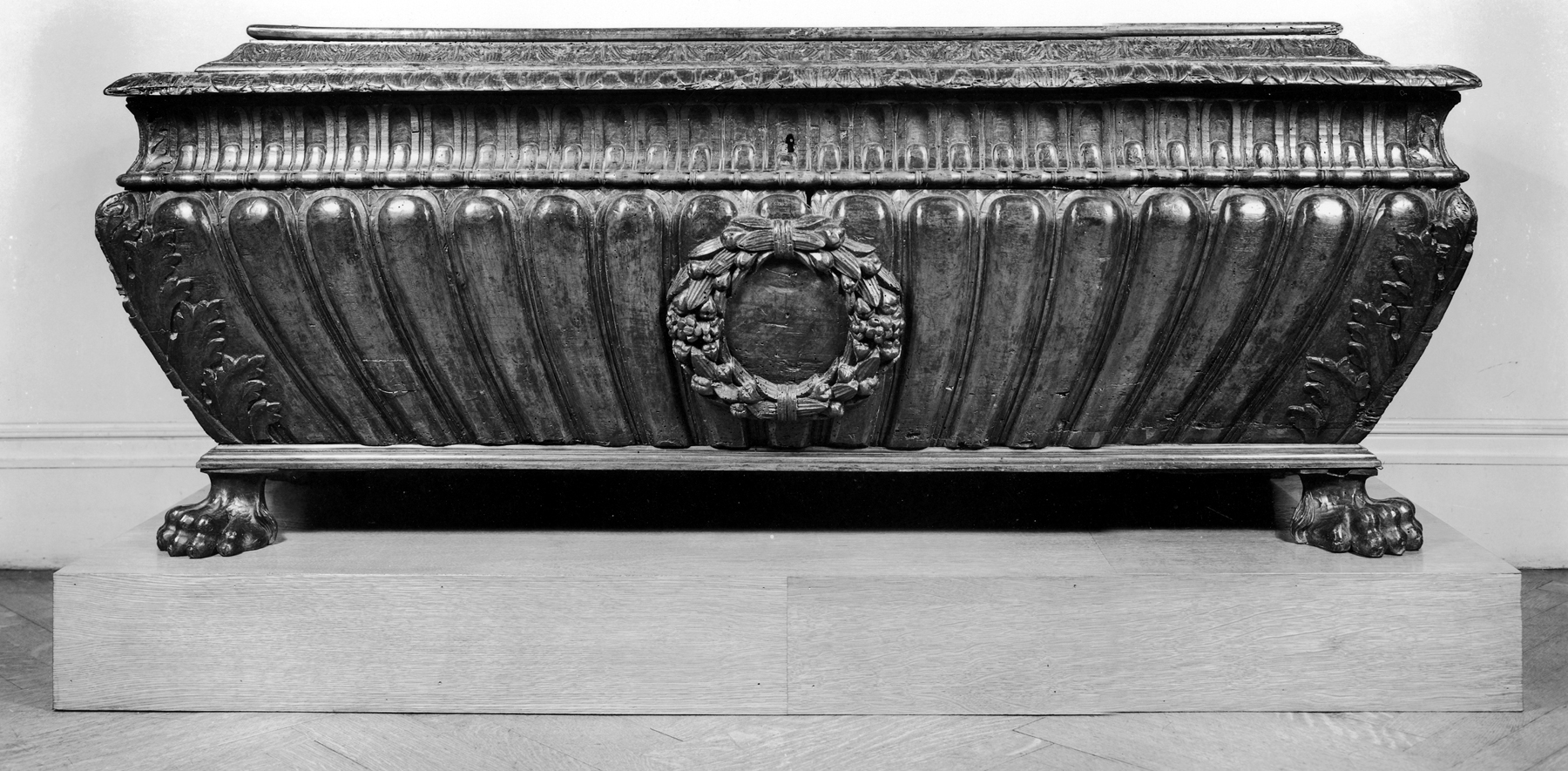
Walnut cassone in the form of an antique sarcophagus, Rome, 16th century (Walters Art Museum)

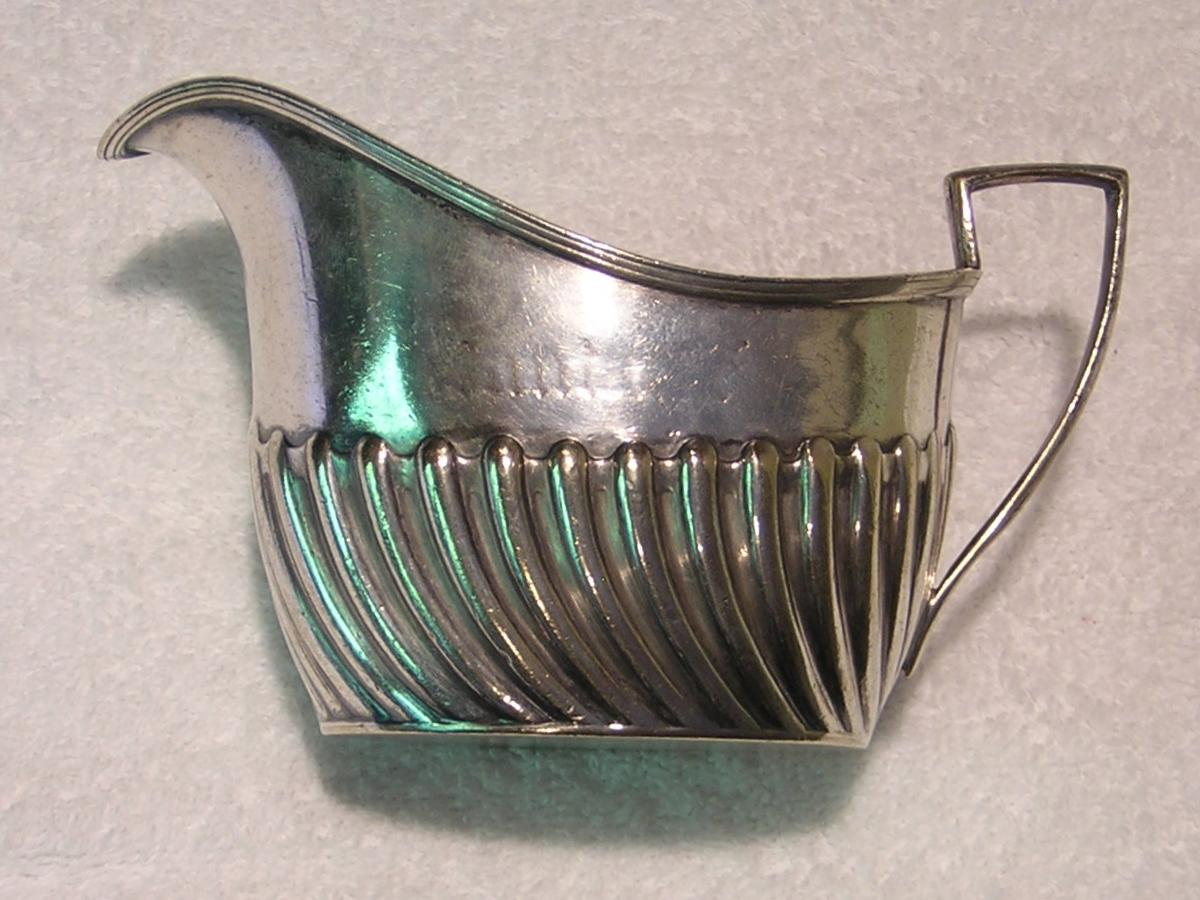
American railroad holloware creamer jug with gadrooning on the lower body, in Regency taste, early 20th century

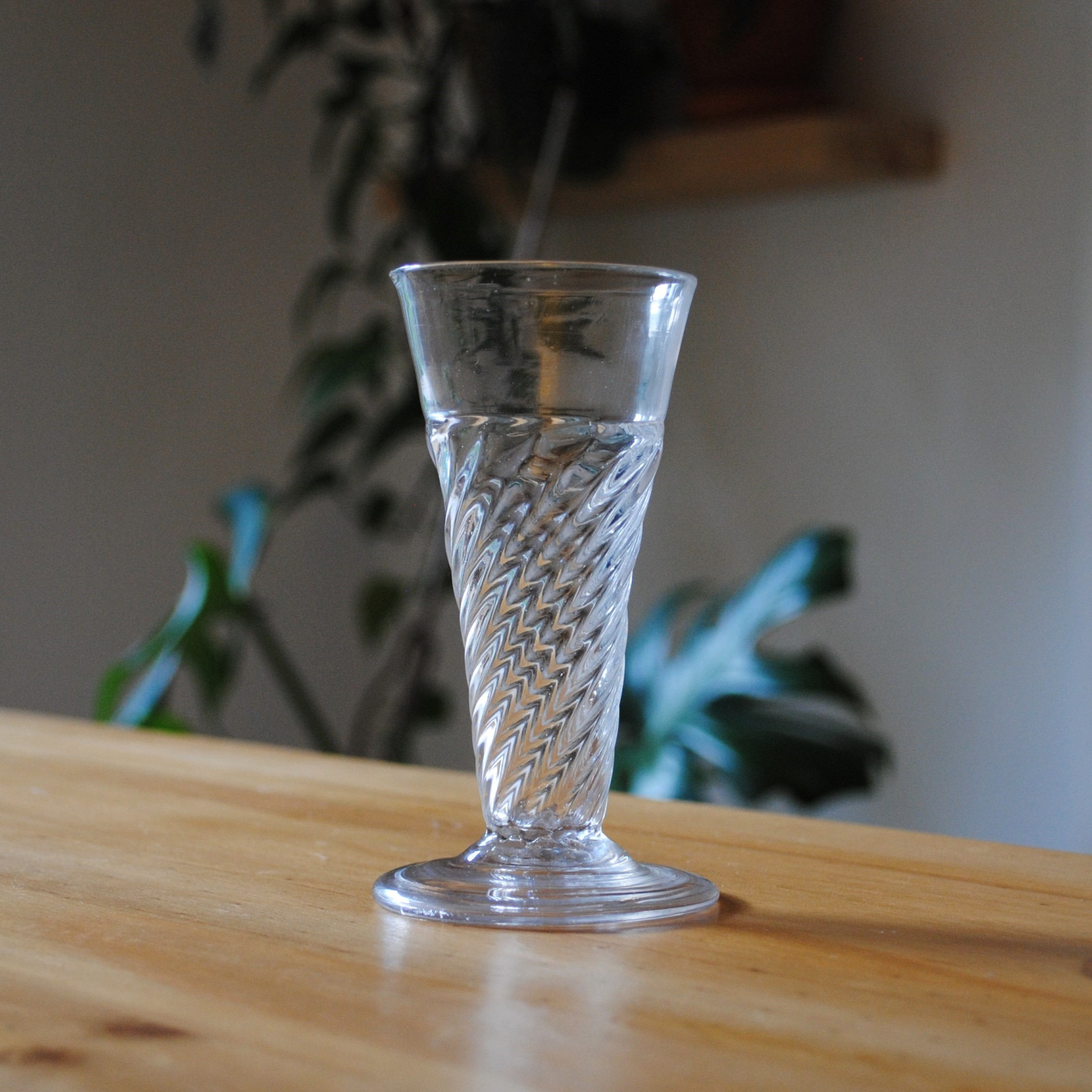
A Georgian ale glass from the around the mid-18th century. It has wrythened gadrooning to the lower half of the bowl.

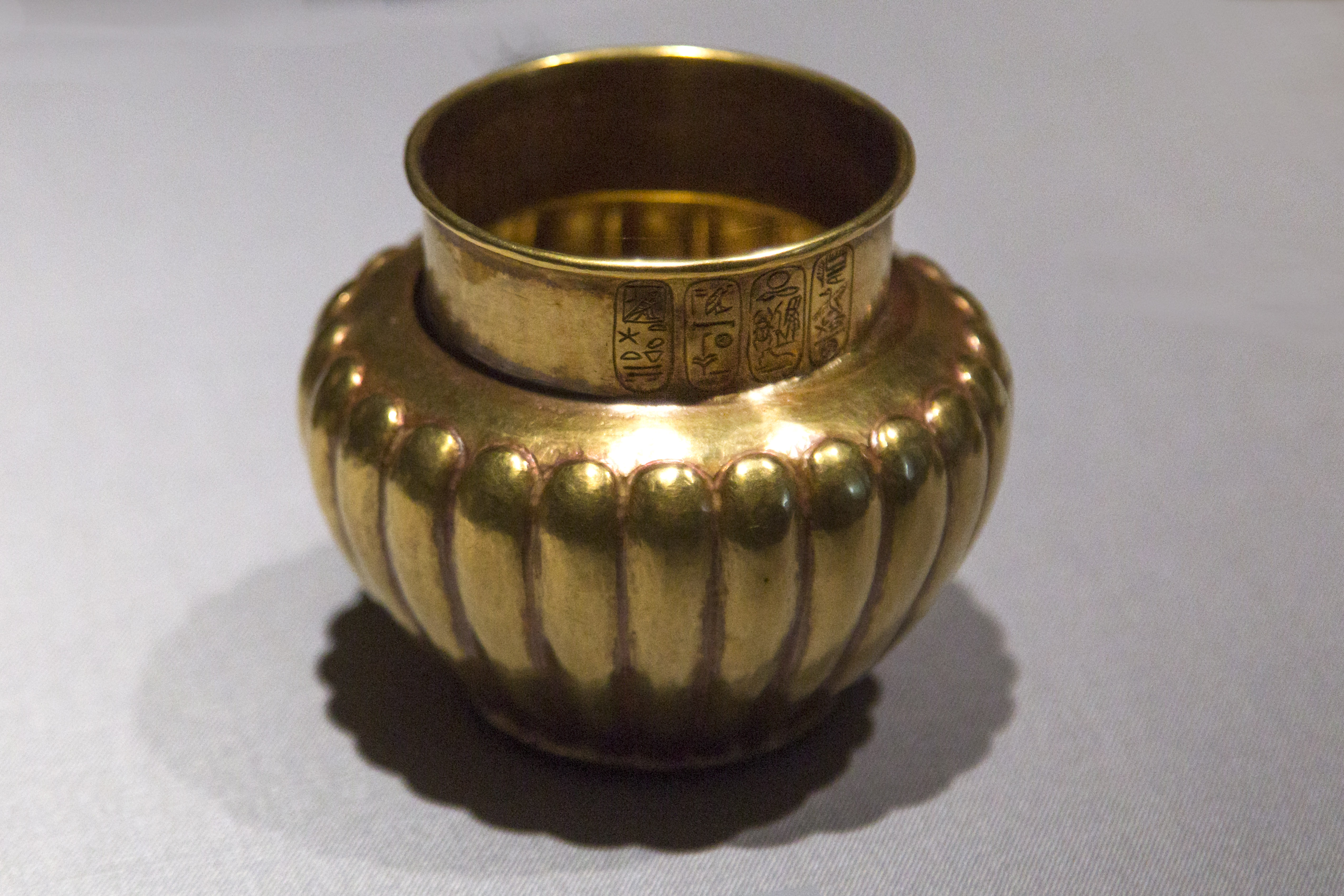
A golden vase of king Psusennes I of Egypt from the 11th century BC

== See also ==
- greebling
