= Rogue One (soundtrack) =

2016 soundtrack album by Michael Giacchino

Soundtrack album by Michael Giacchino
- Released: December 16, 2016
- Studio: Sony Scoring Stage
- Genre: Film soundtrack
- Length: 1:09:18
- Label: Walt Disney
- Producer: Michael Giacchino

Michael Giacchino chronology
Doctor Strange (2016)	Rogue One (2016)	The Book of Henry (2017)

Rogue One: A Star Wars Story (Original Motion Picture Soundtrack) is the soundtrack album to the 2016 film Rogue One directed by Gareth Edwards, which is the first instalment in the Star Wars anthology series. Originally, Alexandre Desplat was hired for the film score but was replaced by Michael Giacchino during the film's post-production. Giacchino scored the film within a span of the month, despite the tight schedule, and had incorporated John Williams' themes from previous Star Wars films into the score, having minor elements, while most of the themes were newly composed. The soundtrack was released by Walt Disney Records on December 16, 2016, coinciding with the film's theatrical release.

The score received a positive response from critics, appreciating Giacchino's tunes as well as the incorporation of minimal cues from Williams' themes. It peaked at number 45 and 17, on the Billboard 200 and soundtracks chart in US, as well as in number 3 on the soundtracks chart from UK's Official Charts Company. An expanded edition, consisting of un-edited and additional demos composed, was released on February 11, 2022, as was a 4-LP disc marketed by Mondo, was published in March 2022.

== Development ==
In March 2015, it was reported that Alexandre Desplat, who had worked with Edwards on Godzilla, would compose the score for Rogue One. Despite rumors that a contract had not been initially set in place by Lucasfilm, Desplat confirmed in an April 2016 interview that he would serve as composer for the film. Concerning the film, Desplat commented that "[Edwards and I] had a great partnership on Godzilla, and I can't wait to be starting with him. It will be in a few weeks from now, and it is very exciting and frightening at the same time because it's such a legendary project. To be called to come after John Williams [...] it's a great challenge for me." But then, in September 2016, it was announced that Michael Giacchino would be replacing Desplat as composer, after the film's reshoots altered the post-production schedule, and reportedly left Desplat no longer available, as he signed for scoring Valerian and the City of a Thousand Planets.

Giacchino only had four and a half weeks to compose the music for the film, beginning almost immediately after finishing production on Doctor Strange. The recording sessions began during mid-October at the Sony Scoring Stage, with a 110-piece orchestra. In an interview with Entertainment Weekly, Giacchino stated: "It is a film that is in many ways a really great World War II movie, and I loved that about it. But it also has this huge, huge heart at the center of it, and that was the one thing I just didn't want to discount. Yes, it's an action movie, and it's a Star Wars film, and it has all the things that you would come to expect and love about that, but I didn't want to forget that it was also an incredibly emotional movie as well. That was what really pulled me in."

He incorporated John Williams' themes from previous films into the score, and claimed that the score borrows traditions from "both John Williams and George Lucas borrowed from when they made the original Star Wars", intending to honor the legacy for Williams' works on the Star Wars franchise. But he further claimed that 95 to 98 percent of the score is fresh and original, having little elements [or] cues from Williams' score. Several instruments such as timpani and percussions were used for the score, in addition to electric guitar and orchestral music. A week before the recording, Giacchino sent a text message to Williams' brother and timpani player, Don Williams asking that there "was an F-load of timpani in the score", which he considered as complicated, for which Don agreed to do so. Giacchino said, "I don't know that I’ve written more timpani for a film than I have for this. He did an incredible job, and it gives this great weight, this great anchor to a lot of the pieces. But it also helps in the more chaotic moments as well."

The opening title theme was considered to be different from the previous saga films, and of the trilogies, as Giacchino believed that "It's sort of its own thing and the whole idea from the very beginning was these should be standalone movies." Some of the themes for Jyn, Krennic, the Guardians of the Whills and a "hope" theme for the Rebel Alliance – in which a choir of 80 members gave vocals in the final appearance – were new themes he had composed. Out of all the score cues, the theme for Jyn was considered as Giacchino's "favourite" due to its emotional depth.

== Reception ==
Professional ratings
Review scores
Source	Rating
Filmtracks	4/5 stars
Movie-Wave	4/5 stars
Movie Music UK	Positive
Soundtrack Geek	8/10 stars

Filmitracks commented, "while Giacchino is and never will be John Williams, he accomplished a feat here that is as passionately loyal as anyone will likely ever hear". Movie Wave reviewer gave 4-stars and said "Michael Giacchino has seemed for some time to be the most likely composer to take over Star Wars when John Williams hangs up his baton, and while there's no sign of that happening yet, this score shows that he's more than ready for the job [...] The musical storytelling is just not as vivid as Williams's and the themes not as memorable (nobody's are) but I do think Giacchino really stepped up, managing to write his own thing while skirting around Williams's style closely enough for it to be a very impressive achievement indeed." Jonathan Broxton of Movie Music UK commented, "When you consider the pressures Giacchino faced in writing this score, not only in terms of time, but in terms of the weight of expectation in writing a score that has to live up to some of the finest film music ever written, the fact that it turned out as good as it has is almost a miracle. His careful adoption of some of Williams's compositional inflections and orchestrations into his own is appropriate and respectful, his main theme (Jyn's theme) is genuinely excellent, and some of the emotional heights he reaches while using it, especially during Galen's death sequence, and the finale on the beach on Scarif, are outstanding."

Bernard H. Heidikamp of Behind The Audio said: "Giacchino delivered an astounding soundtrack, worthy of Williams’ legacy. It's fun, epic and emotional and although not all themes hit home and some shifts in focus regarding the villain-themes would have been in order, it's still an impressive work, even if you don't take into account that he had to write it all in four weeks. The narrative is strong, the orchestrations complex and vivid." Critic George Shaw of Dork Side of the Froce commented,"Rogue One does have its moments of themes, but they're harder to notice given how different, louder and faster paced modern movies have become. It's not John Williams, but an incredible effort from Michael Giacchino." Analysing it as, one of the favourite Star Wars soundtrack, Elaine Tveit had stated "John Williams's Star Wars music is the stuff of legend and can never be matched. But Michael Giacchino's score for Rogue One stands just as strong on its own." Soundtrackbeat wrote "As the first composer who is responsible for the composition of a Star Wars movie soundtrack, following John Williams, there is no doubt that the Force was with him [Giacchino], since his musical product holds a position amongst the best soundtracks of 2016." Vann R. Newkirk of The Atlantic magazine wrote "Giacchino's sound works well for a film that strives to differentiate itself, while still announcing itself as a Star Wars movie."

== Critical analysis ==
The soundtrack has been critically analysed by several commentators, differentiating to the identities of Williams' themes to that of Giacchino's score. Aaron Krewovick had picked four themes from the score, to analyse about the similarities with Williams', but also chose the 17th track, "Your Father Would Be Proud" and compared with John Barry's theme for the titular character, John Dunbar in Dances With Wolves (1990). Tveit had commented "When you think of Star Wars, you think of the triumphant blast of the opening crawl music; the brisk efficiency of the “Imperial March;” and the romanticism of “Across the Stars.” As a composer tasked with creating a soundtrack which sounds like Star Wars and yet isn't just a parody of Williams's style, Giacchino must have felt overwhelmed." Newkirk had commented "From its opening flute solo, Rogue One’s music announces the film as a full member of the canon—one that shares its sense of nostalgia with The Force Awakens. But there are differences. Deviating occasionally from the slow buildup and royal fanfares of previous Star Wars scores, Giacchino uses thriller violins and thumping percussion in the film's more action-oriented scenes. The overall effect is lofty meets earthly, Star Wars meets Saving Private Ryan (also by Williams) [...] Still, ideas from the “Imperial March” and the “Force Theme” make their way into these rousing arrangements."

== Track listing ==
=== Original soundtrack ===
The track titles were leaked onto the internet on December 8, 2016, days before the official tracklist. Giacchino, who has a history of using track titles that contain wordplay, shared his alternate list in the liner notes of the soundtrack release. These names are listed in the notes.

Rogue One: A Star Wars Story (Original Motion Picture Soundtrack)
No.	Title	Length
1.	"He's Here for Us" ("A Krennic Condition")	3:20
2.	"A Long Ride Ahead" ("Jyn and Scare It")	3:56
3.	"Wobani Imperial Labor Camp" ("Jyncarcerated")	0:54
4.	"Trust Goes Both Ways" ("Going to See Saw"; includes "The Force Theme" by John Williams)	2:45
5.	"When Has Become Now" ("That New Death Star Smell"; includes "Death Star Motif" by John Williams)	1:59
6.	"Jedha Arrival" ("Jedha Call Saw")	2:48
7.	"Jedha City Ambush" ("When Ambush Comes to Shove")	2:19
8.	"Star-Dust" ("Erso-Facto")	3:47
9.	"Confrontation on Eadu" ("Go Do, That Eadu, That You Do, So Well"; includes "Death Star Motif" by John Williams)	8:05
10.	"Krennic's Aspirations" ("Have a Choke and a Smile"; includes "Imperial Motif" and "The Imperial March" by John Williams)	4:16
11.	"Rebellions Are Built on Hope" ("Erso in Vain")	2:56
12.	"Rogue One" ("Takes One to Rogue One"; includes "The Force Theme" by John Williams)	2:04
13.	"Cargo Shuttle SW-0608" ("World's Worst Vacation Destination")	3:59
14.	"Scrambling the Rebel Fleet" ("Scarif Tactics"; includes "The Force Theme" and "Star Wars Main Theme" by John Williams)	1:33
15.	"AT-ACT Assault" ("Bazed and Confused"; includes "Rebel Fanfare" and "Imperial Walkers" by John Williams)	2:55
16.	"The Master Switch" ("Switch Hunt")	4:02
17.	"Your Father Would Be Proud" ("Transmission Impossible")	4:51
18.	"Hope" ("Live and Let Jedi"; includes "The Imperial March", "Death Star Motif", "Rebel Blockade Runner", and "The Force Theme" by John Williams)	1:37
19.	"Jyn Erso and Hope Suite"	5:51
20.	"The Imperial Suite"	2:29
21.	"Guardians of the Whills Suite"	2:52
Total length:		69:18

=== Expanded edition ===
On February 11, 2022, an extended version of the soundtrack was released. The soundtrack features un-edited cues and additional demos, which were not featured on the first album – including tracks which were previously only found on the films 'For Your Consideration' promotional soundtrack. Three days later, Mondo announced a four-disc LP album pressed on 180-gram black vinyl, which featured a new artwork by John Powell and additional liner notes. Spencer Hickman, creative director of Mondo, said: "A firm fan-favorite bridging the gap between old and new Star Wars, Michael's score is phenomenal, featuring nobs to John William's classic Star Wars scores whilst firmly being its own thing." The pre-order of the vinyl edition, began on February 16, and the album was set to release in March 2022.

Rogue One: A Star Wars Story (Original Motion Picture Soundtrack/Expanded Edition)
No.	Title	Length
1.	"He's Here for Us" ("A Krennic Condition")	3:22
2.	"A Long Ride Ahead" ("Jyn and Scare It")	3:57
3.	"Wobani Imperial Labor Camp" ("Jyncarcerated")	0:57
4.	"There Are Spies Everywhere"	2:16
5.	"The Detention of Jyn Erso" (includes "Rebel Fanfare" by John Williams)	1:13
6.	"Jyn’s Interrogation" (Includes "The Force Theme" by John Williams)	1:57
7.	"Mission to Jedha"	2:00
8.	"Trust Goes Both Ways" ("Going to See Saw"; includes "The Force Theme" by John Williams)	2:46
9.	"When Has Become Now" ("That New Death Star Smell"; includes "Death Star Motif" by John Williams)	2:00
10.	"Jyn’s Memories of Childhood"	0:51
11.	"Jedha Arrival" ("Jedha Call Saw")	2:49
12.	"Hearts of Kyber"	0:57
13.	"Ambush in Jedha City"	1:09
14.	"Jedha City Ambush" ("When Ambush Comes to Shove")	2:20
15.	"Let Them Pass in Peace (Part 1)"	1:24
16.	"Let Them Pass in Peace (Part 2)"	0:39
17.	"No Friends of the Empire"	1:07
18.	"Imperial Departure"	0:54
19.	"Reunion at Saw’s Hideout"	0:46
20.	"Cassian’s Prison"	0:19
21.	"Today of All Days"	3:51
22.	"Star-Dust" ("Erso-Facto")	3:48
23.	"An Imperial Test of Power"	3:37
24.	"Apologies Are in Order"	1:37
25.	"News from the Ashes"	0:59
26.	"Approach to Eadu"	1:19
27.	"No Trust Among Rebels"	2:25
28.	"Jyn’s Path Is Clear"	2:31
29.	"Confrontation on Eadu" ("Go Do, That Eadu, That You Do, So Well"; includes "Death Star Motif" by John Williams)	8:09
30.	"Krennic's Aspirations" ("Have a Choke and a Smile"; includes "Imperial Motif" and "The Imperial March" by John Williams)	4:17
31.	"Rebellions Are Built on Hope" ("Erso in Vain")	2:55
32.	"A Rebel Change of Heart"	1:53
33.	"Rogue One" ("Takes One to Rogue One"; includes "The Force Theme" by John Williams)	2:06
34.	"Cargo Shuttle SW-0608" ("World's Worst Vacation Destination")	4:01
35.	"Good Luck Little Sister"	2:49
36.	"What Brings You to Scarif"	2:31
37.	"Are We Blind"	1:33
38.	"Scrambling the Rebel Fleet" ("Scarif Tactics"; includes "The Force Theme" and "Star Wars Main Theme" by John Williams)	1:34
39.	"AT-ACT Assault" ("Bazed and Confused"; includes "Rebel Fanfare" and "Imperial Walkers" by John Williams)	2:56
40.	"Finding a Way Through" (includes "Rebel Fanfare" by John Williams)	3:36
41.	"Project Star-Dust"	3:46
42.	"Entering the Imperial Archives"	1:24
43.	"Get That Beach Under Control"	1:13
44.	"The Master Switch" ("Switch Hunt")	4:02
45.	"We Have to Press the Attack"	2:40
46.	"Scarif Antenna Alignment"	3:16
47.	"Your Father Would Be Proud" ("Transmission Impossible")	4:53
48.	"Hope" ("Live and Let Jedi"; includes "The Imperial March", "Death Star Motif", "Rebel Blockade Runner", and "The Force Theme" by John Williams)	1:40
49.	"Jyn Erso and Hope Suite"	5:53
50.	"The Imperial Suite"	2:31
51.	"Guardians of the Whills Suite"	2:52
52.	"Jyn Erso and Hope Suite – Alternate Open"	6:02
53.	"Guardians of the Whills Suite – Alternate Ending"	2:23
54.	"A Long Ride Ahead – Alternate Ending"	3:59
55.	"Jedha City Ambush – Alternate"	1:11
56.	"Rebellions Are Built on Hope – Alternate"	2:57
57.	"Scarif Antenna Alignment – Alternate"	1:22
Total length:		143:45

== Charts ==
Chart (2016–17)	Peak position
Belgian Albums (Ultratop Flanders)	74
Belgian Albums (Ultratop Wallonia)	125
Dutch Albums (Album Top 100)	123
French Albums (SNEP)	195
German Albums (Offizielle Top 100)	67
Scottish Albums (Official Charts)	79
Spanish Albums (PROMUSICAE)	48
Swiss Albums (Schweizer Hitparade)	67
UK Albums (Official Charts)	70
UK Soundtrack Albums (OCC)	3
US Billboard 200	45
US Soundtrack Albums (Billboard)	17
