= Sony Studios =

Sony Studios may refer to:

- Sony Music Studios, a former music studio
- Sony Pictures, a film studio company
- Sony Pictures Studios, a film studio complex owned by Sony Pictures
