= Star Trek Beyond (soundtrack) =

Star Trek Beyond (Music from the Motion Picture)

Soundtrack album by Michael Giacchino
- Released: July 29, 2016
- Recorded: May 24 – June 8, 2016
- Studios: Newman Scoring Stage, Century City, California
- Genre: Film score
- Length: 61:13
- Label: Varèse Sarabande
- Producers: Michael Giacchino; J. J. Abrams

Michael Giacchino chronology
Zootopia (2016)	Star Trek Beyond (Music from the Motion Picture) (2016)	Doctor Strange (2016)

Singles from Star Trek Beyond (Music from the Motion Picture)
- 1. "Sledgehammer" Released: June 27, 2016

Professional ratings
Review scores
Source	Rating
Filmtracks.com	3/5 stars
Movie Wave	4/5 stars
Soundtrack Dreams	88/100
Soundtrack Geek	96.7/100

Star Trek Beyond (Music from the Motion Picture) is a soundtrack album for the 2016 film, Star Trek Beyond, composed by Michael Giacchino, conducted by Tim Simonec and performed by the Hollywood Studio Symphony. The soundtrack album was released in physical form on July 29, 2016, through Varèse Sarabande, as the follow-up to the critically successful 2009 soundtrack album Star Trek and the 2013 soundtrack album Star Trek Into Darkness.

== Track listing ==
All music is composed by Michael Giacchino.

No.	Title	Length
1.	"Logo and Prosper"	1:47
2.	"Thank Your Lucky Star Date"	2:15
3.	"Night on the Yorktown"	5:36
4.	"The Dance of the Nebula"	2:22
5.	"A Swarm Reception"	2:30
6.	"Hitting the Saucer a Little Hard"	6:10
7.	"Jaylah Damage"	2:50
8.	"In Artifacts as in Life"	1:51
9.	"Franklin, My Dear"	2:50
10.	"A Lesson in Vulcan Mineralogy"	5:17
11.	"MotorCycles of Relief"	3:17
12.	"Mocking Jaylah"	3:26
13.	"Crash Decisions"	3:16
14.	"Krall-y Krall-y Oxen Free"	4:23
15.	"Shutdown Happens"	4:35
16.	"Cater-Krall in Zero G"	2:17
17.	"Par-tay for the Course"	2:46
18.	"Star Trek Main Theme"	3:45
Total length:		61:13

== Personnel ==
Credits adopted from Allmusic:

Production

- Michael Giacchino – composer, producer
- Alexander Courage – original material
- Gene Roddenberry – original material
- J. J. Abrams – executive producer
- Hollywood Studio Symphony – orchestra
- Reggie Wilson – orchestra contractor
- Page LA Studio Voices – choir/chorus
- Bobbi Page – vocal contractor

Orchestration, management and technical

- Warren Brown – editing assistant
- Vincent Cirilli – Pro Tools
- David Coker – composer's assistant
- Andrea Datzman – vocal coordinator
- Stephen Davis – editing
- Patricia Sullivan Fourstar – mastering
- Joel Iwataki – engineer, mixing
- Jeff Kryka – orchestration
- Tim Lauber – scoring recordist
- Jason Richmond – soundtrack coordination
- Tim Simonec – conductor, orchestration
- Randy Spendlove – executive in charge of music
- Denis St. Amand – stage engineer
- Tom Steel – stage manager
- Damon Tedesco – stage manager
- Robert Townson – executive in charge of music
- Eric Wegener – editing assistant
- Booker White – music preparation
- Mae Crosby - live to picture consultant

== Charts ==
Chart (2016)	Peak position
Belgian Albums (Ultratop Flanders)	179

== See also ==
- List of Star Trek composers and music
- "Sledgehammer" - Original song for Star Trek Beyond by Rihanna and co-written by Sia.
