= The Book of Henry (soundtrack) =

2017 film soundtrack album

The Book of Henry (Original Motion Picture Soundtrack)

Film score by Michael Giacchino
- Released: June 16, 2017
- Recorded: 2017
- Studios: Abbey Road Studios, London
- Genre: Film score
- Length: 50:50
- Label: Back Lot Music
- Producer: Michael Giacchino

Michael Giacchino chronology
Rogue One (2016)	The Book of Henry (2017)	Spider-Man: Homecoming (2017)

The Book of Henry (Original Motion Picture Soundtrack) is the film score composed by Michael Giacchino to the 2017 film The Book of Henry directed by Colin Trevorrow. The score was released through Back Lot Music on June 16, 2017.

== Background ==
In February 2016, director Colin Treverrow announced on Twitter that Michael Giacchino, who previously worked with the director in Jurassic World would score music for The Book of Henry. The score was recorded at the Abbey Road Studios in London and was completed in August 2016 much prior to the film's initially scheduled release on that September. Because of the film's darker and emotional themes, Giacchino was tasked to provide a delicate and melancholic scores that stood in contrast to his large scale orchestral scores composed for big-budget films. Giacchino hence considered the score to be his personal favorite despite the film's negative critical reception and box office underperformance.

== Release ==
The soundtrack was released through Back Lot Music on June 16, 2017. Stevie Nicks performed a song titled "Your Hand I Will Never Let It Go" which was featued in the film, but not in the soundtrack.

== Reception ==
James Southall of Movie Wave wrote "Giacchino's a composer capable of bringing a smile to anyone's face (as he does in the early tracks on this album) but in this circumstance he had to go down the other route and for all its obvious quality as a film score, that means this is an album unlikely to be played very often even by his biggest fans. At its very best, there is just a hint of Georges Delerue (the one film composer more than any other who was able to write in this style and make it entirely captivating on an album) – I'm thinking particularly of the gut-wrenching take on the main theme in "Target Practice". I'm sure a lot of people will admire the music and it is very nice to hear something a bit more intimate from the composer; I'm just not sure all that many will actually enjoy listening to that much of it."

Filmtracks wrote "Listeners not enthralled with Giacchino's tendency to underplay his hand at suspense will find the second half of the score to be a bore [...] There's just not quite enough engaging material here to recommend, and with the theme and suspense material both highly reminiscent of the composer's other works, this one's easy to skip even if there's nothing blatantly wrong with it." Emily Yoshida of Vulture called it a "swelling" score. Todd Wanderwerff of Vox wrote "The score by Oscar-winning composer Michael Giacchino is soaring." Tim Grierson of Screen International wrote "Scored by Oscar-winner Michael Giacchino [...] the movie sounds [...] impressive for a relatively low-budget production." Jason Adams of JoBlo.com called it "a great score by the dependable Michael Giacchino".

Dan Callahan of TheWrap called it "a gentle piano-based score by Michael Giacchino". Sandy Schaefer of Screen Rant wrote The more light-hearted moments and scenes in the film get most of their personality from the score composed by Michael Giacchino". Matt Singer of ScreenCrush wrote "The film's score is by Michael Giacchino, one of our very best film composers, and he frames every emotional beat Trevorrow wants to hit."

== Track listing ==
No.	Title	Length
1.	"Overture"	2:32
2.	"Treehouse Inventions"	2:01
3.	"Cheering Up the Mountain"	0:46
4.	"Predator in Their Midst"	1:13
5.	"Research and Development"	3:17
6.	"Shaking, Not Stirred"	0:26
7.	"On Mortality"	0:45
8.	"Henry's Final Wish"	3:41
9.	"A Tender House Call"	1:05
10.	"Book Discovery: System of Abuse"	2:02
11.	"Do You Have Prince Albert in a Can?"	5:29
12.	"Target Practice"	1:43
13.	"Forging Ahead"	2:00
14.	"Peter's Lament"	2:50
15.	"The Parable of the Talents"	4:18
16.	"Christina's Dance"	3:31
17.	"Susan for Justice"	4:48
18.	"Peter the Great"	1:43
19.	"Into the Fire"	2:24
20.	"Closing the Book on Henry"	0:34
21.	"Your Hand I Will Never Let It Go"	3:42
Total length:		50:50
