= Kitbashing =

Creation of a new model by combining elements of multiple commercial kit models

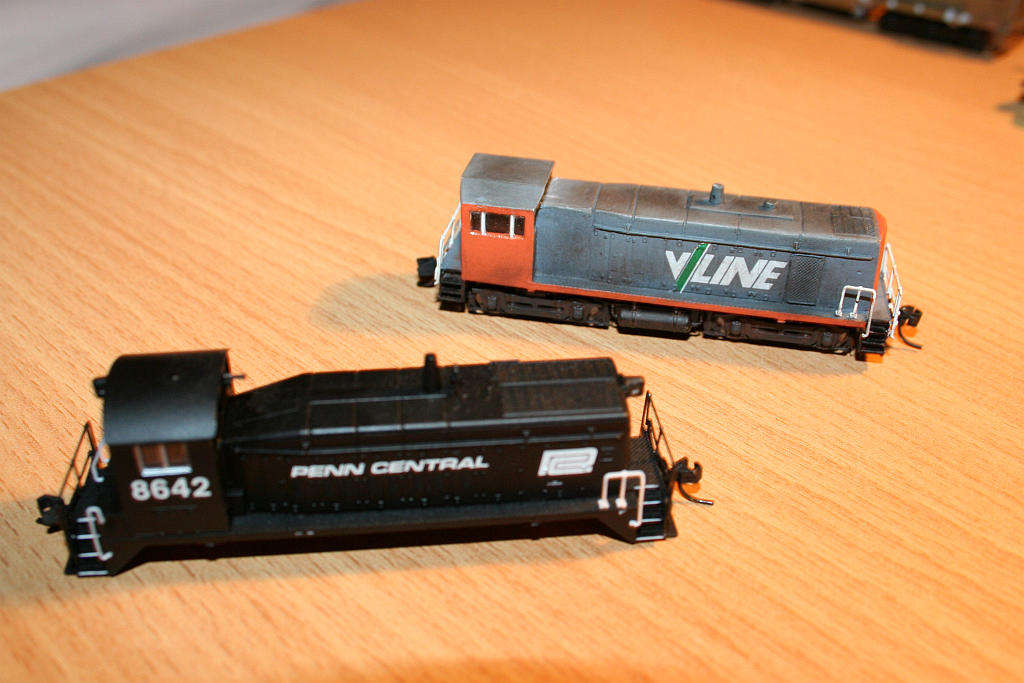
Commercial model of an EMD SW9 (left) kitbashed into a 'lookalike' of a Victorian Railways Y class (right)

Kitbashing or model bashing is the practice of making a new scale model by taking pieces out of kits. These pieces may be added to a custom project or to another kit. For professional modelmakers, kitbashing is used to create concept models for detailing movie special effects. Commercial model kits are a ready source of "detailing", providing any number of identical, mass-produced components that can be used to add fine detail to an existing model. Professionals often kitbash to build prototype parts which are then recreated with lightweight materials.

== Purposes, history, and methods ==
For the hobbyist, kitbashing saves time that would be spent scratch building an entire model. Hobbyists may kitbash to create a model of a subject (real or imaginary) for which there is not a commercial kit.

Although it has a long history, kitbashing came to the attention of a wider public via the fine modelwork seen in TV series such as Thunderbirds, Star Trek and the films 2001: A Space Odyssey and Star Wars Episode IV: A New Hope. Many of the spaceship models created for these programs incorporated details from tank, speedboat and car kits. Another example is the Batmobile from the 2005 film Batman Begins, as seen in the special features disc of the film's DVD.

It is not uncommon for parts to be cut and filed into shapes leaving gaps that are later filled with putty to hide defects. Textural details known as greebles may be added to enhance a model.

Sometimes, kitbashing has been used to create works of art. The Toronto sculptor Kim Adams has used HO gauge freight cars, containers, detail parts, figures and scenery to create artistic landscapes. American artist Kris Kuksi also uses kitbashing to detail his maximalist sculptures.

== Genres ==
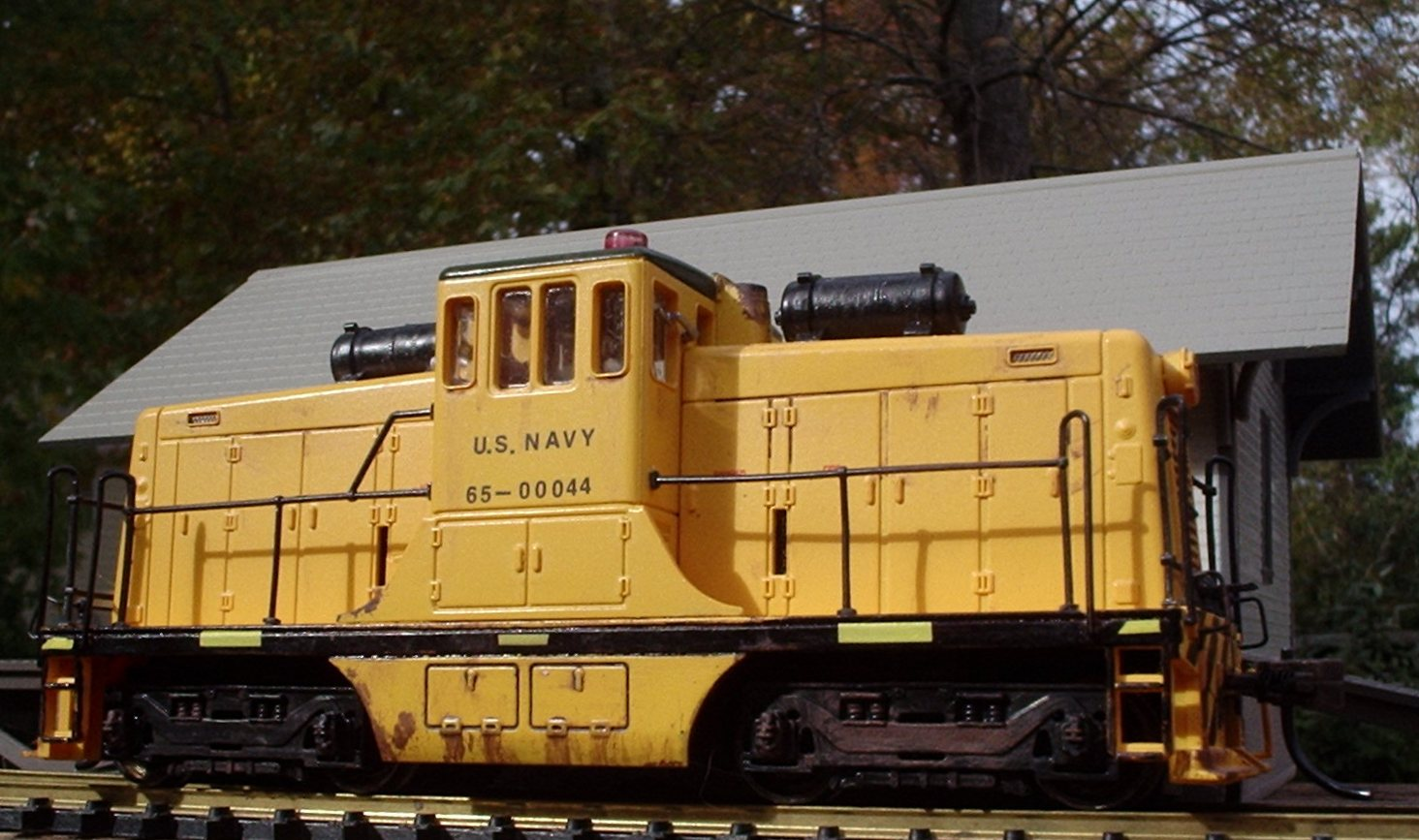
A center cab switcher made by Bachmann has parts added to look more realistic.

A popular venue for kitbashing is diecast emergency vehicles such as fire apparatuses. Kitbashers often use models from manufacturers such as Code 3 and Corgi. The kitbash in such cases can be as simple as painting or redecaling a model, or as complex as tearing the model down and adding scratch-built components, followed by custom decals.

An important aspect of kitbashing in model railroading is the reconfiguration of structure kits, most often to fit the geometry of a specific space. Walls can be shortened or lengthened, and corner angles can be changed, to fit a given location on the layout. Another application is to use the wall parts to create a "flat", or shallow relief model to be displayed against the backdrop. In this configuration the parts for the rear wall of a structure, often an industrial building, can instead be abutted to the front to double the length of the building. Plain sheet styrene or other material is typically added to the rear to strengthen the resulting model.

In model rocketry, kitbashing refers simply to using the pieces from one kit to build a different model. This is typically used to create unusual or especially complex models.

With radio-controlled aircraft, such kitbashing can be done to kitted aircraft as they are being built, or, more often, to so-called "almost-ready-to-fly" (ARF) aircraft to change their appearance or flight characteristics to suit the owner. This can even extend to "plans-bashing", where a plans-built model has its construction plans partially re-drawn by the builder, either by hand or with computer-aided design software before any part of the model's airframe has been fabricated from raw materials.

== See also ==
- Mashup (disambiguation)
- Greeble
