= War for the Planet of the Apes (soundtrack) =

War for the Planet of the Apes (Original Motion Picture Soundtrack)

Film score by Michael Giacchino
- Released: July 14, 2017
- Recorded: 2017
- Studios: Newman Scoring Stage, Twentieth Century Fox Studios
- Genre: Film score
- Length: 75:11
- Labels: Sony Classical; Fox Music
- Producer: Michael Giacchino

Michael Giacchino chronology
Spider-Man: Homecoming (2017)	War for the Planet of the Apes (2017)	Coco (2017)

War for the Planet of the Apes (Original Motion Picture Soundtrack) is the score album for the 2017 film of the same name directed by Matt Reeves. The film is the sequel to Dawn of the Planet of the Apes (2014) and the third installment in the Planet of the Apes reboot franchise. The film score is composed by Reeves' frequent collaborator Michael Giacchino, and was digitally released through iTunes and Amazon on July 14, 2017 by Sony Classical Records and Fox Music. It was later released in physical formats on July 28. The score received critical acclaim from critics and fetched numerous accolades.

== Development ==
"Caesar is all about empathy, wanting to do what's best for everyone, trying to make people aware that they can live together. He's constantly fighting for that better place to be, and here suddenly he is pushed into a corner, into a place where he no longer had access to any of that empathy, any of the sadness that he was feeling, all he had left was anger. I thought that was a really interesting story to tell musically. What do you when you are left with only anger. How do you get through that to find the empathy, to find the sadness and allow yourself to heal and move on?"

— Giacchino, on Caesar's character in War for the Planet of the Apes.

Giacchino wrote the full score after the first edit of the film being assembled, and developed new thematics for the film within couple of days. While composing for the film, Giacchino discussed on Reeves' idea on turning Caesar (Andy Serkis) into a "mythic and historical character" referring Exodus or Moses. Giacchino had a different tonal approach for Caesar, regarding his emotional journey and compared to Dawn of the Planet of the Apes, this film was mentioned to be his "most emotional films he had worked on". The cue "Exodus Wounds" composed of piano and strings, swelled with brass in the conclusion. He said "Caesar's been on a crazy journey, and I was inspired seeing him grow and struggle. It's heartbreak, and how close you skate to those lines that you try to avoid in your life."

"An Ode to Nova" is the theme played when Caesar adopts Nova, a human war orphan, consisting of a piano and harp re-occurring four times. Giacchino called that the theme is all about "capturing this suspended tone of someone who is lost, doesn't have a family, or anywhere to go, and day after day is the same. At the end, there's a change when she walks into the prison camp, where she finds her strength…helping other people." For the main antagonist, Colonel McCullough (Woody Harrelson), Giacchino wrote a theme begins with timpani drums which "conveys the coming of dread and anxiety", but keeps going underneath where everything is related to Colonel.

The score was recorded at Newman Scoring Stage, with Tim Simonec and Marshall Bowen conducting the 90-piece ensemble from the Hollywood Studio Symphony orchestra, and a 60-member vocal choir also performing the score. Percussionist Emil Richards also played the percussions for the score, in his last film before his death in December 2019. Prior to recording the film, the orchestra performed original music for the film's final trailer, but was not used in the end.

== Track listing ==
No.	Title	Length
1.	"Apes' Past is Prologue"	10:53
2.	"Assault of the Earth"	5:29
3.	"Exodus Wounds"	4:23
4.	"The Posse Polonaise"	1:39
5.	"The Bad Ape Bagatelle"	1:13
6.	"Don't Luca Now"	3:53
7.	"Koba Dependent"	2:54
8.	"The Ecstasy of the Bold"	1:57
9.	"Apes Together Strong"	7:12
10.	"A Tide in the Affairs of Apes"	5:31
11.	"Planet of the Escapes"	2:42
12.	"The Hating Game"	2:04
13.	"A Man Named Suicide"	5:32
14.	"More Red Than Alive"	2:41
15.	"Migration"	2:03
16.	"Paradise Found"	5:35
17.	"End Credits"	9:30
Total length:		75:11

== Reception ==
Unlike Giacchino's score for Dawn of the Planet of the Apes, the score received critical acclaim from critics. James Southall of Movie Wave wrote "Michael Giacchino has written some brilliant music so far in his career but War for the Planet of the Apes feels like a bit of a milestone: it's not just the best film music he's ever written, it's the manner of the score, the construction of the dramatic narrative, the very deliberate emotional prods that make it stand out as a special achievement. I love that he was able to bring in such nice little homages to great film composers of the past at the same time as writing music that couldn't be mistaken for anyone's but his own: he's a confident, mature composer at the very top of his game." Jonathan Broxton of Movie Music UK wrote "Doyle's Rise of the Planet of the Apes is the best score of the new rebooted series, there is still much to admire in Giacchino's efforts, and this one is by far the best of his two."

Filmtracks.com wrote "the variations on the four themes allow Giacchino another score with a solid narrative flow. The dichotomy between the opening two cues and the flowery initial ambience and chime-banging conclusion to "Paradise Found" is quite something to behold. On album, this score battles with Doyle's for the best in the history of the concept, and for its breadth of development, War for the Planet of the Apes prevails. A superior 30-minute album could be condensed from the long commercial product, one complete with the usual idiotic track titles and hidden cue at the end. Despite its flaws, the score remains among 2017's most impressive surprises." Tony Black of Flickering Myth gave a 10/10 to the score saying "Michael Giacchino really hits it out the park here with a score that builds on everything he did well in the previous picture and takes it to another level entirely (in that way it mirrors Matt Reeves' movie as it happens). In a career already littered with gems, War For the Planet of the Apes is further proof Giacchino might well now be the finest composer working in Hollywood today. Gorgeous, moving work you need to get in your ears."

Justin Chang of Los Angeles Times called it as "piercingly beautiful score", while Joe Morgenstern of The Wall Street Journal called it as "majestic", Rolling Stone's Peter Travers hailed Giacchino's score as one of the film's best aspects. Calling it as "another excellent score", Screen Rant writer Sandy Schafer "one that, like his score for Dawn, is a throwback to the music from the very first Planet of the Apes movie - further amplifies its ominous temperament and dramatic storytelling approach". Jimmy Champane of Bloody Disgusting said "If I was held at gunpoint and forced to pick one aspect of War that stood out the most to me, it would be Michael Giacchino's score. Even though some of the film's best moments don't feature any music at all, when the soundtrack kicks in, it's impossible not to feel exactly what the characters on screen are feeling. It calls back to the films that came before this franchise almost flawlessly all while feeling fresh and new with its string-heavy beats. Much like I did after seeing Star Wars Episode VII: The Force Awakens, I'll be listening to War's score on the way to work for weeks or even months to come." Gizmodo wrote "Lots of Reeves' success comes from liberal use of a dynamic score by Michael Giacchino. It's a wide-ranging composition that brings a true cohesion to the film. The movie moves very quickly, but the music helps everything feels cohesive, propulsive and poignant."

IndieWire noted the possibilities of Giacchino's score to be a potential Academy Award-nominee with Giacchino's score receiving critical praise. Writing for the same publication, chief critic Eric Kohn had opined that "Giacchino's vibrant score is one of the reasons the Apes series 'distinguishes itself from so many cacophonous Hollywood spectacles.'"

== Accolades ==
List of awards and nominations
Award	Date of ceremony	Category	Recipients	Result	Ref.
San Francisco Film Critics Circle	December 10, 2017	Best Original Score	Michael Giacchino	Nominated	
Chicago Film Critics Association	December 12, 2017	Best Original Score	Michael Giacchino	Nominated	
Seattle Film Critics Society	December 18, 2017	Best Original Score	Michael Giacchino	Nominated	
Houston Film Critics Society	January 6, 2018	Best Original Score	Michael Giacchino	Nominated	
Georgia Film Critics Association	January 12, 2018	Best Original Score	Michael Giacchino	Nominated	
Satellite Awards	February 10, 2018	Best Original Score	Michael Giacchino	Nominated	
International Film Music Critics Association Awards	February 22, 2018	Score of the Year	Michael Giacchino	Nominated	
International Film Music Critics Association Awards	February 22, 2018	Best Original Score for a Fantasy/Science Fiction/Horror Film	Michael Giacchino	Won	
International Film Music Critics Association Awards	February 22, 2018	Film Music Composition of the Year	"End Credits" from War for the Planet of the Apes by Michael Giacchino	Won	

== Personnel ==
Credits adapted from CD liner notes.

- Music – Michael Giacchino
- Engineer – Tim Lauber
- Recording – Vincent Cirilli, Joel Iwataki
- Music editing – Paul Apelgren
- Mixing – Joel Iwataki
- Mastering – Patricia Sullivan
- Musical assistance – David Coker
- Technician – Jeff Kryka
- Music supervision – Patrick Houlihan
- Music coordinator– Jeff Kryka
- Copyist – Booker White

Instruments

- Bassoon – Damian Montano, Kenneth Munday, Rose Corrigan
- Cello – Alisha Bauer, Aniela Perry, Cameron Stone, Dane Little, Dermot Mulroney, Giovanna Clayton, John Acosta, Kevan Torfeh, Stefanie Fife, Suzie Katayama, Vahe Hayrikyan, Victor Lawrence, Martin Tillman, Steve Richards
- Clarinet – Gary Bovyer, John Mitchell, Joshua Ranz, Donald Foster
- Double bass – Chuck Nenneker, Christian Kollgaard, Dave Stone, Donald Ferrone, Drew Dembowski, Karl Vincent, Michael Valerio, Nico Abondolo, Norman Ludwin, Oscar Hidalgo, Peter Doubrovsky
- Flute – Jennifer Olson, Bobby Shulgold, Steve Kujala, Heather Clark
- French Horn – Brad Warnaar, Daniel Kelley, Jenny Kim, Joseph Meyer, Mark Adams, Steve Becknell, Teag Reaves, David Everson
- Guitar – George Doering
- Harp – Gayle Levant
- Keyboards – Alan Steinberger
- Oboe – Joseph Stone, Lara Wickes
- Percussion – Alex Acuna, Bernie Dresel, Emil Richards, Haig Shirinian, Kenneth McGrath, Mike Englander, Walter Rodriguez, Daniel Greco
- Piano – Mark Gasbarro
- Timpani – Don Williams
- Trombone – Alan Kaplan, William Reichenbach, Steve Holtman, Alex Iles
- Trumpet – Jon Lewis, David Washburn
- Tuba – Doug Tornquist
- Viola – Andrew Duckles, Cameron Patrick, Caroline Buckman, Cassandra Lynne Richburg, Evan Wilson, Harry Shirinian, Jorge Moraga, Karen Elaine, Karie Prescott, Leah Katz, Luke Maurer, Maria Newman, Michael Nowak, Pamela Goldsmith, Darrin McCann
- Violin – Aimee Kreston, Amy Hershberger, Armen Anassian, Carolyn Osborn, Chang Tina Qu, Charles Bisharat, Clayton Haslop, Darius Campo, Jim Sitterly, Jessica Guideri, Joel Derouin, John Wittenberg, Josefina Vergara, Kenneth Yerke, Kevin Connolly, Kevin Kumar, Laurence Greenfield, Lorenz Gamma, Lucia Micarelli, Marina Manukian, Mark Robertson, Neel Hammond, Nina Evtuhov, Peter Kent, Phillip Levy, Rebecca Bunnell, Roberto Cani, Ron Clark, Sara Parkins, Sarah Thornblad, Songa Lee, Tamara Hatwan, Roger Wilkie

Orchestra and choir

- Orchestra – The Hollywood Studio Symphony
- Choir – Aaron Page, Allie Feder, Alvin Chea, Amick Byram, Andrea Datzman, Ann Sheridan, Baraka May Williams, Ben Bram, Ben Lin, Beth Andersen, Bill Cantos, Bob Joyce, Bobbi Page, Charissa Nielsen, Christine Guter, Christy Crowl, Clydene Jackson, David Joyce, Debbie Gleason, Diane Freiman Reynolds, Donna Medine, Ed Zajac, Edie Lehmann Boddicker, Elin Carlson, Gary Stockdale, Greg Whipple, Guy Maeda, Holland Greco, Jackie Williams, James Harper, James Hayden, Jennifer Haydn-Jones, Jessica Freedman, Joanna Bushnell, John Kimberling, Jon Keenan, Jonathan Merrill, Josh Bedlion, Katie Hampton, Kelsi Hahn, Kenton Chen, Kerry Katz, Larry Kenton, Laura Dickinson, Laura Jackman, Leanna Brand, Monica Lee, Monique Donnelly, Oren Waters, Rishi Menon, Roger Freeland, Scott Oatley, Scottie Haskell Mitchell, Steve Amerson, Susie Logan, Todd Honeycutt, Vatsche Barsoumian, Virenia Lind, Walt Harrah, Will Wheaton
- Concertmistress – Belinda Broughton
- Orchestration – Jeff Kryka, Tim Simonec
- Orchestra conductor – Marshall Bowen, Tim Simonec
- Choir contractor – Bobbi Page
- Orchestra contractor – Connie Boylan, Reggie Wilson, Reggie Wilson
- Stage engineer – Denis St. Amand
- Stage managers – Damon Tedesco, Peter Nelson

Management

- Soundtrack co-ordination (Twentieth Century Fox) – JoAnn Orgel
- Business affairs (Twentieth Century Fox) – Tom Cavanaugh
- Music clearance (Twentieth Century Fox) – Ellen Ginsburg
- Executive in charge of music (Twentieth Century Fox) – Danielle Diego
- Licensing (Sony Classical) – Mark Cavell
- Product development (Sony Classical) – Klara Korytowska
- Music production supervisor (Twentieth Century Fox) – Rebecca Morellato

Booklet

- Booklet editor – WLP Ltd.
- Artwork and design – WLP Ltd.
- Liner notes – Michael Giacchino, Matt Reeves
