= Star Warrior (disambiguation) =

Star Warrior is a 1980 science fiction role-playing video game.

Star Warrior or Star Warriors may also refer to:

- Star warrior, a group to which Kirby belongs in his anime series
- Star Warrior, a ring-name used by Bob Roop
- Star Wars: Star Warriors, a 1987 board game, spinoff of the West End Games' Star Wars role-playing game
- Star Warriors, a nickname for the VAQ-209 Electronic Attack Squadron
- Star Warriors : A Penetrating Look into the Lives of the Young Scientists Behind Our Space Age Weaponry, a 1985 book by William Broad
- The Five Star Warriors, a plot element of the video game Sakura Wars: So Long, My Love
- "Star Warrior: Silent Warrior", an episode of Robo Formers.
- Sternenkrieger (literally "Star Warriors"), a German release title for Nausicaä of the Valley of the Wind, a 1984 anime film
- Yamaha Road Star Warrior, a variant of the Yamaha XV1600A motorcycle
- Star warrior, the occupation of the Super Mario RPG character Geno

== See also ==
- Galactic Warriors, a 1985 fighting arcade video game
- Space Warriors (disambiguation)
