= I've Never Seen Star Wars =

I've Never Seen Star Wars may refer to:

- I've Never Seen Star Wars (radio series), a BBC Radio 4 comedy chat show presented by Marcus Brigstocke, in which celebrity guests try new experiences
- I've Never Seen Star Wars (TV series), a television version of the original radio show, broadcast on BBC Four
