= Architecture of Star Wars =

Architecture in the Star Wars universe

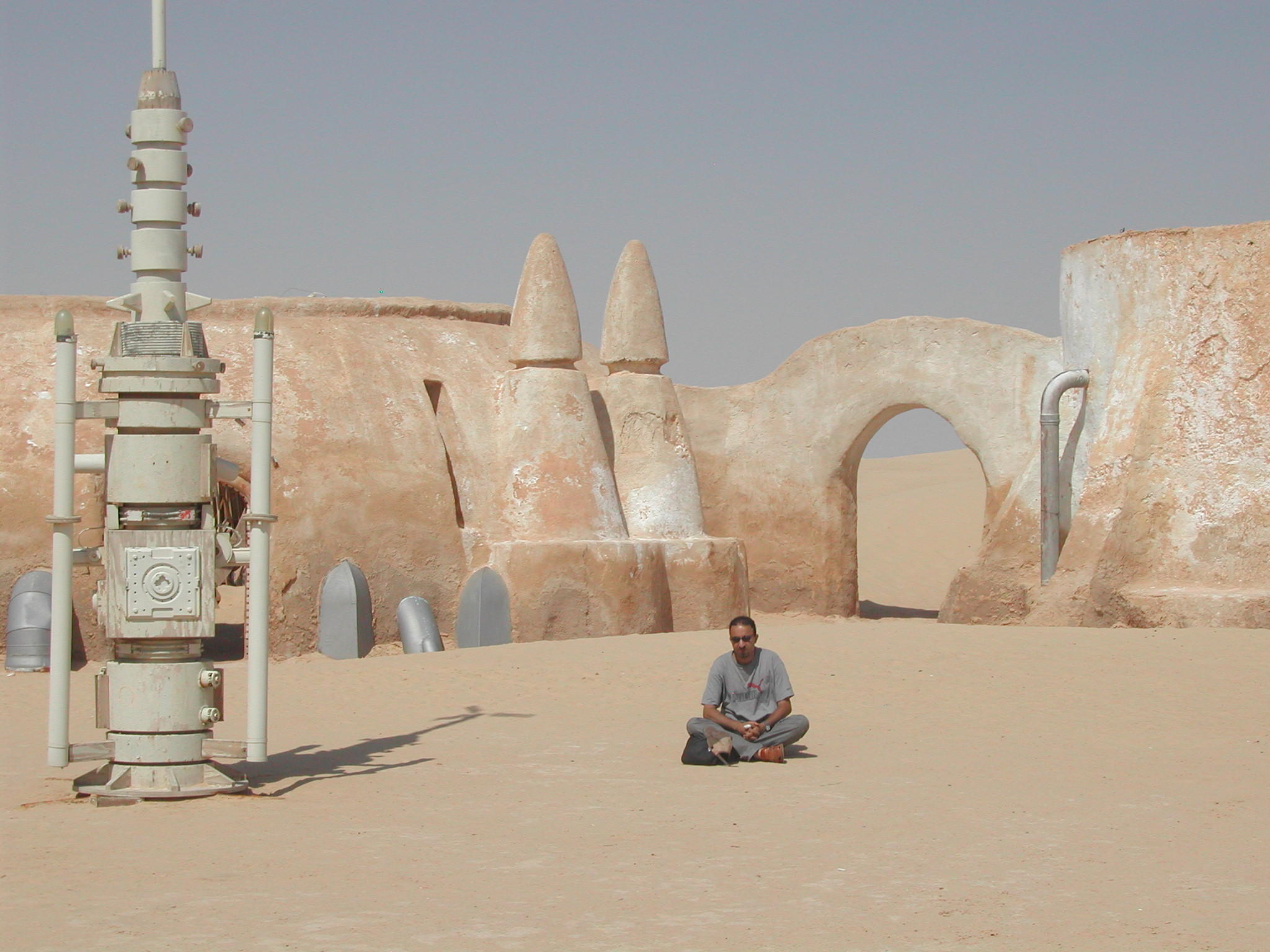
Star Wars filming location in Tunisia

Architecture in Star Wars includes the cities, buildings, ships, and other structures of the fictional Star Wars universe as described and depicted in books, movies, comics, and cartoons. Architects' Journal ranked the top 10, including the Death Star and the Jedi Temple.

Comparing the urban and natural environments pictured in Star Wars, Mark Lamster wrote that the cities are places of danger and corruption, while the forces of good find sanctuary in the natural world. He also describes the "retro-futurist" cities in the series as being between those extremes and places of "great beauty but dubious moral character." He attributes the ambivalence towards urbanity to series creator George Lucas' own feelings about cities and urban environments.

== Planet settings ==
Luke Skywalker is first seen in Star Wars Episode IV: A New Hope living with his adoptive parents in a "complex of caves and domed structures" on Tatooine, filmed in the Tunisian desert town of Matmata. The end of the first movie was shot in the Guatemalan rain forest where a celebration with rebel allies takes place in a cave area (a scene said to be borrowed from Leni Riefenstahl's 1935 Nazi propaganda film Triumph of the Will). The exotic locales provide scenery that is unfamiliar to "all but a few experts in non-western architecture", providing the films with fantastic settings that could still be believable.

== Urban planning ==
In 1999, architecture and planning students noted that The Phantom Menace offered "a variety of urban development options".

The "urban future" has also been depicted in Blade Runner where "the setting is a grimy, crime-ridden Los Angeles in the 21st century". The architecture of Star Wars may also have been influenced by Stanley Kubrick's 2001: A Space Odyssey. The designs continued Lucas' work from his first feature film, THX 1138, which featured a claustrophobic, Orwellian "subterranean world of black-and-white spaces" where the population is subdued with drugs and kept under constant surveillance.

=== Jedi Temple ===
Architects' Journal rated the Jedi Temple (located in the capital planet of Coruscant) third on its top-ten architecture of Star Wars list behind the second Death Star and Jabba the Hutt's palace on Tatooine, and ahead of Coruscant, capital city of the Old Republic. The temple is described in the article as adapting "the robust typology of Mayan temples, with durasteel cladding specified for the external stone walls for improved defensive strength" and said to be a ziggurat that "is built above a Force-nexus and has ample room for training facilities, accommodation and the Jedi Archive." The temple has five towers—the tallest is Tranquillity Spire—that are stylistically similar to the minarets surrounding the Hagia Sophia in Istanbul. Star Wars Insider listed it as the 100th greatest thing about Star Wars in its 100th-issue special.

== Ships ==
The battle cruisers featured in Star Wars have been described as examples of "Suprematist architecture". Ship designs in Star Wars often make heavy use of greebles to create an illusion of mechanical function and scale.

== Real world buildings that mirror Star Wars ==
The San Francisco Federal Building designed by Thom Mayne has been compared to the Jawa Sandcrawler featured in Star Wars Episode IV: A New Hope. The ING headquarters building (in Amsterdam, Netherlands) has been described as looking like something out of Star Wars that could "move forward on its legs". Conversely, the Trinity College, Dublin, Long Room Library is thought to be the basis for the Jedi Academy Library in Star Wars: Episode II – Attack of the Clones. Coruscant scenes for the second season of the Star Wars series Andor have been filmed at the City of Arts and Sciences in Valencia, Spain.

== See also ==
- Greeble
- Jedi Academy
- TIE fighter
- Technology in Star Wars
