= Doctor Strange (soundtrack) =

Doctor Strange (Original Motion Picture Soundtrack)

Soundtrack album by Michael Giacchino
- Released: October 21, 2016
- Studios: Abbey Road Studios; Studio Miraval
- Genre: Film score
- Length: 66:19
- Labels: Hollywood; Marvel Music
- Producer: Michael Giacchino

Michael Giacchino chronology
| Star Trek Beyond (2016) | Doctor Strange (Original Motion Picture Soundtrack) (2016) | Rogue One: A Star Wars Story (2016) |

Doctor Strange (Original Motion Picture Soundtrack) is the soundtrack album to the Marvel Studios film of the same name, composed by Michael Giacchino. Hollywood Records released the album digitally on October 21, 2016, with a physical release on November 18, 2016.

== Background ==
In May 2016, Michael Giacchino revealed that he would score the film. Director Scott Derrickson called the score "magic in the literal sense of the word" adding Giacchino "is doing what good scorers do, which is he is not just creating music that supports the images, he's adding a third thing to the movie. It becomes something new with his music in there that it didn't have with temp music." The score was recorded at Abbey Road Studios with additional score recorded at Studio Miraval in France. During the recording session, Paul McCartney heard one of Giacchino's cues being recorded, which he likened to The Beatles song "I Am the Walrus".

== Track listing ==
All music composed by Michael Giacchino.

| No. | Title | Length |
|---|---|---|
| 1. | "Ancient Sorcerer's Secret" | 2:37 |
| 2. | "The Hands Dealt" | 2:56 |
| 3. | "A Long Strange Trip" | 2:28 |
| 4. | "The Eyes Have It" | 1:23 |
| 5. | "Mystery Training" | 1:53 |
| 6. | "Reading Is Fundamental" | 1:39 |
| 7. | "Inside the Mirror Dimension" | 4:04 |
| 8. | "The True Purpose of the Sorcerer" | 2:09 |
| 9. | "Sanctimonious Sanctum Sacking" | 7:27 |
| 10. | "Astral Doom" | 3:41 |
| 11. | "Post Op Paracosm" | 1:15 |
| 12. | "Hippocratic Hypocrite" | 1:34 |
| 13. | "Smote and Mirrors" | 6:29 |
| 14. | "Ancient History" | 4:08 |
| 15. | "Hong Kong Kablooey" | 3:35 |
| 16. | "Astral World's Worst Killer" | 6:17 |
| 17. | "Strange Days Ahead" | 5:59 |
| 18. | "Go for Baroque" | 2:55 |
| 19. | "The Master of the Mystic End Credits" | 3:50 |
| Total length: | | 66:19 |

=== Additional music ===
At the beginning of the first surgery, "Shining Star" by Earth, Wind & Fire plays. "Feels so Good" by Chuck Mangione was not included in the film's soundtrack. Derrickson, a Bob Dylan fan, looked for a place in the film to include one of his songs, but was unable to find one. However, he included Pink Floyd's "Interstellar Overdrive".

== Charts ==
Weekly chart performance for Doctor Strange (Original Motion Picture Soundtrack)
| Chart (2016) | Peak position |
|---|---|
| UK Soundtrack Albums (OCC) | 24 |
