= Greeble =

Detailing added to make models appear more complex

A visual effects model of a ship from Close Encounters of the Third Kind featuring extensive greebling

Greebles, also called greeblies (singular: greebly) or nurnies, are small relief details used to give visual complexity to a model. The act of decorating a model with greebles is known as greebling. While greebling originated as a technique in filmmaking, it is commonly used in model-making, toy design, and kitbashing.

The term greeblies was coined by George Lucas in the 1970s to describe details on model ships used in the production of Star Wars. Ron Thornton is credited with coining the term nurnies to refer to CGI technical detail that his company Foundation Imaging produced for the Babylon 5 series, while the model-making team of 2001: A Space Odyssey referred to them as wiggets.

In science-fiction model design, greebles are used to imply mechanical function without necessarily having any real purpose. They may also serve to create an illusion of scale. In the production of Star Wars, many ship models began as simple shapes that were given visual complexity by attaching greebles taken from commercially-available model kits. Greebling is a common aspect of Lego model design.

== See also ==
- Architecture of Star Wars
- Technology in Star Wars
- Bump mapping
- Diapering
- Fractal art
- Horror vacui
