= Sony Pictures Studios =

Television and film studio complex, California, U.S.

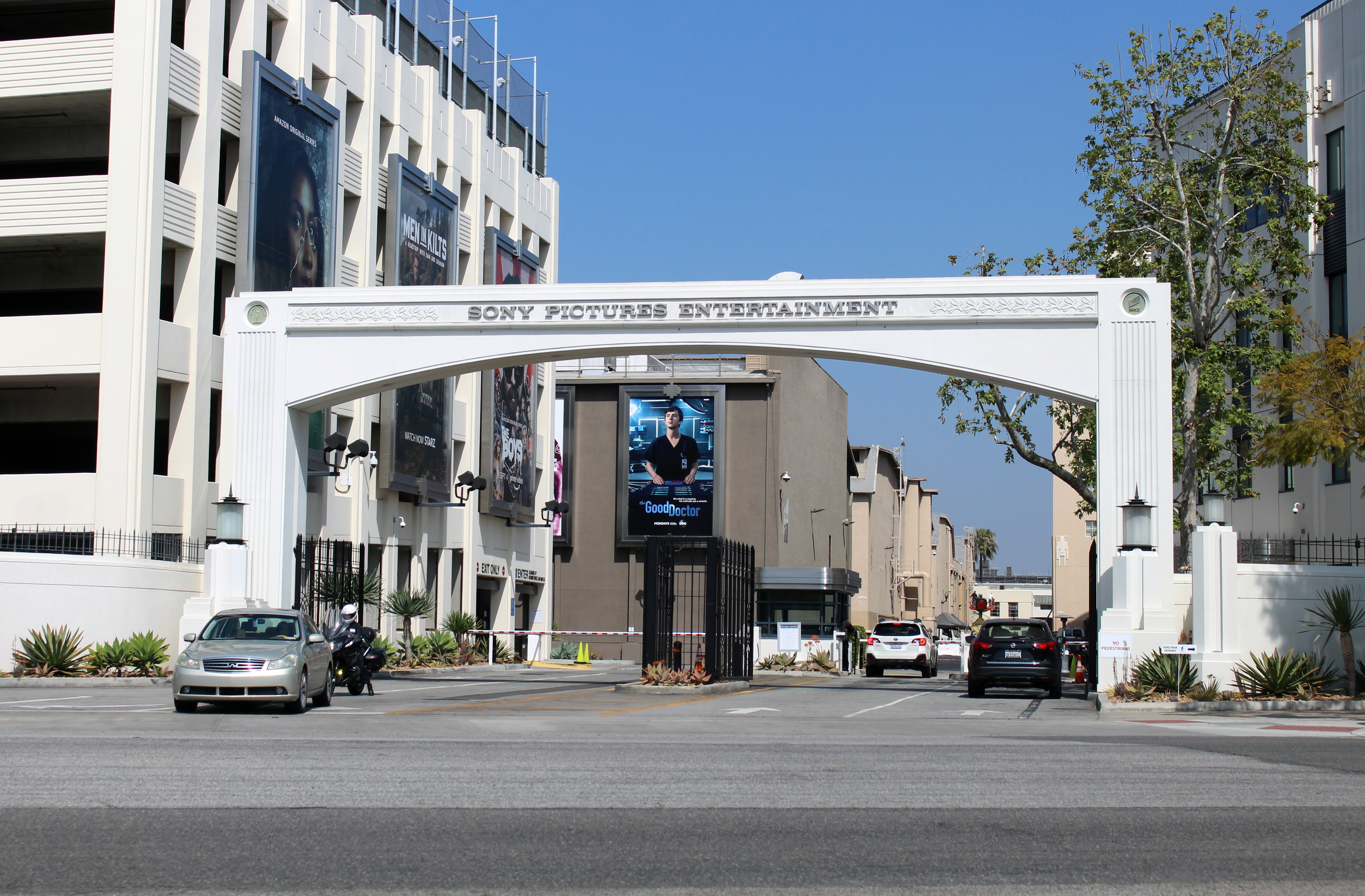
- Culver/Motor Gate entrance to Sony Pictures Studios

- Location within Western Los Angeles
- Location: Culver City, California, U.S.
- Coordinates: 34.017222°N 118.401667°W
- Opening date: 1912; 114 years ago (as Inceville Studios)
- Developer: Thomas H. Ince
- Owner: Sony Pictures (Sony)
- No. of tenants: 15

Sony Pictures Studios is an American, Japanese-owned, television and film studio complex located in Culver City, California, at 10202 West Washington Boulevard and bounded by Culver Boulevard (south), Washington Boulevard (north), Overland Avenue (west) and Madison Avenue (east). Founded in 1912, the facility is currently owned by Sony Pictures and houses the division's film studios, such as Columbia Pictures, TriStar Pictures, and Screen Gems. The complex was the original home of Metro-Goldwyn-Mayer from 1924 to 1986 and Lorimar-Telepictures from 1986 to 1988.

In addition to films shot at the facility, several television shows have been broadcast live or taped there. The lot, which is open to the public for daily studio tours, currently houses a total of sixteen separate sound stages.

The studio complex also houses Sony Pictures' California-based operations, as well as the Culver City offices of sister Sony companies Crunchyroll, LLC, Sony Music and Sony Music Publishing.

== History ==
=== Early years (1912–1924) ===
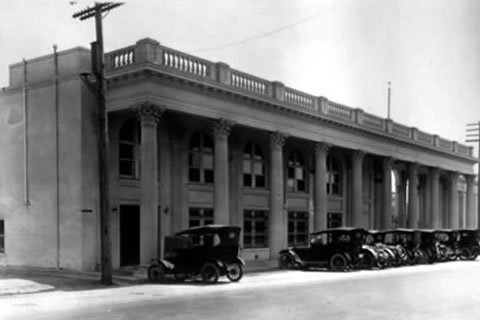
Photograph of original colonnade of Triangle Film Corporation, c. 1916

Director Thomas H. Ince built his pioneering Inceville studios in Pacific Palisades, Los Angeles, in 1912. While Ince was filming at Ballona Creek in 1915, Harry Culver, the founding father of Culver City, persuaded Ince to move Inceville to Culver City. During that time, Ince co-founded Triangle Film Corporation and the Triangle Studios was opened in the form of a Greek colonnade – the entrance to the studios. The colonnade still stands fronting Washington Boulevard and is a Culver City historical landmark.

Ince added a few stages and an Administration Building before selling out to his partners D. W. Griffith and Mack Sennett. Ince relocated down the street and built the Culver Studios at that location. In 1918, Triangle Studios was sold to film producer Samuel Goldwyn. Goldwyn also added a few sound stages before selling his shares in Goldwyn Studios.

=== MGM Studios/Lorimar-Telepictures Studios/Lorimar Studios (1924–1990) ===
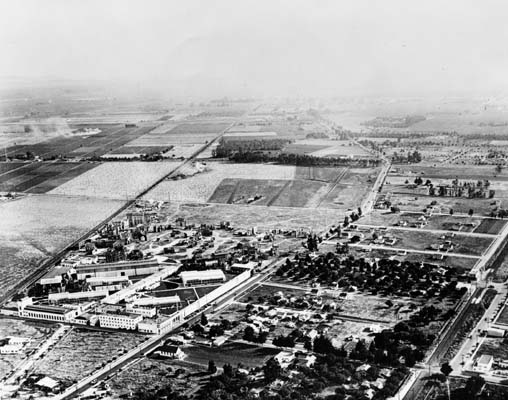
Aerial shot of Goldwyn Studios c. 1922

In 1924, Loew's President Marcus Loew organized the mergers and acquisitions of three film companies—Metro Pictures, Goldwyn Pictures and Louis B. Mayer Pictures—to form Metro-Goldwyn-Mayer, occupying the Goldwyn production facilities.

In the Classic Hollywood cinema, MGM Studios was responsible for shooting 52 films a year, from screen epic films such as Ben-Hur (1959) and Mutiny on the Bounty (1962), to drawing-room dramas such as Grand Hotel (1932) and Dinner at Eight (1933). But it was the Technicolor musical films, including The Wizard of Oz (1939) and Singin' in the Rain (1952) that MGM was best known for. MGM's success led to six working studio complexes, more than 180 acres (0.73 km^{2}) including twenty-eight soundstages – Stage 15 is the second largest sound stage in the world, and Stage 27 served as "Munchkinland" in the production of The Wizard of Oz.

In addition to the main production building, MGM added two large backlot facilities – Lot 2 located opposite the main studio across Overland Avenue. Lot 3 entered the corner of Jefferson Boulevard and Overland Avenue and was MGM's largest backlot. The administration building was inaugurated in 1938 and was named for Thalberg.

However, the United States v. Paramount Pictures, Inc. antitrust case of 1948 severed MGM's connection with Loews Theaters, and it struggled through its affairs.

On August 10, 1965, a massive fire destroyed Vault #7 in Lot 3, resulting in the loss of hundreds of silent-era films, among them Lon Chaney's 1927 film London After Midnight, though the majority of MGM's silent film stock survived the fire. In 1969, millionaire Kirk Kerkorian bought MGM and proceeded to dismantle the studio. MGM's film memorabilia was sold through an 18-day auction, and 38 acres (150,000 m^{2}) of the studio's backlots were sold. Lot 3 was razed while Lot 2 was sold to housing developments. Kerkorian used the money to construct his MGM Resorts hotel chain.

In 1981, Kerkorian's Tracinda acquired United Artists and merged it with MGM to become MGM/UA Entertainment Co. He then sold MUEC to Ted Turner in 1986, who after 74 days, sold MGM/UA back to Kerkorian while retaining the pre-1986 MGM film library. In 1986, the studio lot was sold to Lorimar-Telepictures. During that time, the MGM logo was removed from the studios and moved across the street to the Filmland Building (now known as Sony Pictures Plaza) before their 1992 and 2003 moves to Santa Monica and Century City and finally settling in Beverly Hills from 2011 onwards.

After Amazon acquired MGM, the landmark Metro-Goldwyn-Mayer sign that was in storage was restored and relocated on a soundstage wall in the former Culver Studios in 2025.

=== Columbia Studios/Sony Pictures Studios (1990–present) ===
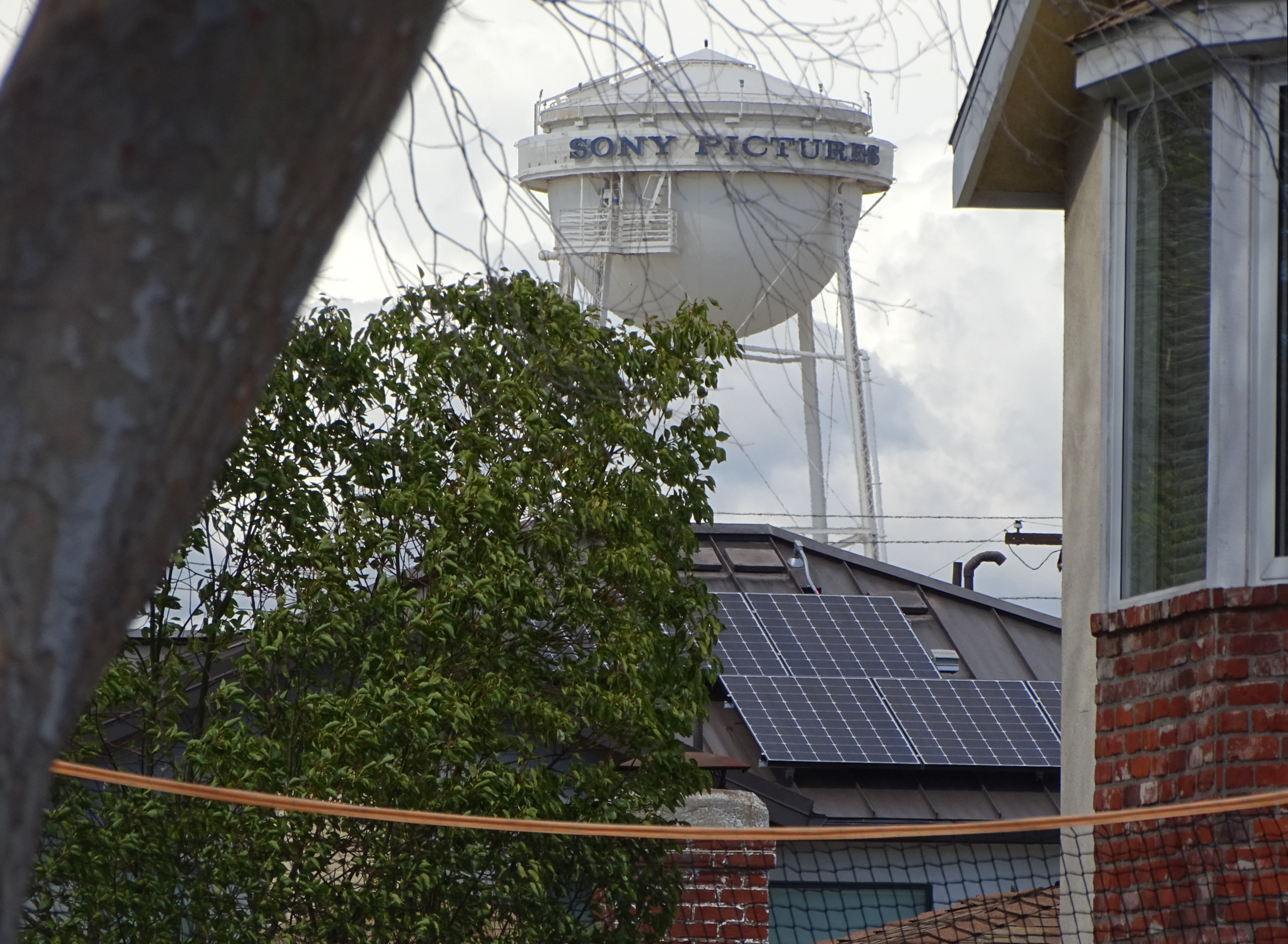
Water tower in the center of the Sony Pictures studio complex

In 1988, Warner Communications acquired Lorimar-Telepictures two years before merging with Time Inc. to become Time Warner (now Warner Bros. Discovery). The following year, Sony hired producers Jon Peters and Peter Guber to run the company's newly acquired Columbia Pictures Entertainment unit, even though they had a contract with Warner Bros. To resolve this issue, Warner sold their Lorimar lot to Columbia, among other deals. Columbia Pictures had been sharing with Warner Bros. their studio lot in Burbank, California, in a partnership called The Burbank Studios starting in 1972. Sony sold its interest in The Burbank Studios as a result of the Guber-Peters issue.

Sony acquired the property, first renamed Columbia Studios, in poor condition and thereafter invested $100 million to renovate the studio complex. The property underwent a three-year comprehensive plan as it transitioned to the 45 acres (0.18 km^{2}) Sony Pictures Studios complex. The buildings, many of which still bore the names of MGM film actors such as Clark Gable, Judy Garland, and Burt Lancaster, were painted and upgraded. New walls were erected around the lot and the ironwork gates were restored. Jerry Bradley recently stated the project would be overseen by Nett Construction Inc. Nostalgic art deco and false fronts on Main Street were added, as well as hand-painted murals of Columbia film posters. The MGM logo was removed from the Filmland Building in late 1992.

The long-running television game shows Jeopardy! (Stage 10, renamed "The Alex Trebek Stage" in July 2021) and Wheel of Fortune (Stage 11), along with their spin-offs, have been taped at Sony Pictures Studios since the mid-1990s.

==== Gary Martin Soundstage ====
The Gary Martin Soundstage (Stage 15), named for longtime Columbia Pictures production executive Gary Martin, is one of the largest soundstages on the Sony Pictures Studios lot. Encompassing approximately 42,000 square feet, it was at one time advertised as the largest soundstage in North America. The stage is historically notable for its use in the 1939 MGM film The Wizard of Oz, including scenes depicting the Yellow Brick Road, and it was later used again for the 2013 film Oz the Great and Powerful. Owing to its size, the soundstage has been used for large-scale feature film productions as well as live broadcast events and music performances.

==== Barbra Streisand Scoring Stage ====
The Barbra Streisand Scoring Stage on the Sony Pictures Studio lot has been a large orchestra recording space since the 1930s. It spans 600 square meters, and is one of the world's largest recording studios. It is also equipped with a 96 Channel AMS Neve 88VR mixing console, compatible with those used in the Newman Scoring Stage on the Fox Studio Lot, and Studio One at Abbey Road in London. Films scored on the stage have included The Wizard of Oz (1939, Herbert Stothart), Gone with the Wind (1939, Max Steiner); Anchors Aweigh (1945, George Stoll); An American in Paris (1951, Johnny Green and Saul Chaplin); Ben Hur (1959, Miklos Rozsa); Lawrence of Arabia (1962, Maurice Jarre); Doctor Zhivago (1965, Maurice Jarre); the majority of the Indiana Jones films (1984–2023, John Williams); Beauty and the Beast and Aladdin (1991 and 1992, Alan Menken); the Toy Story series (1995-2026, Randy Newman); the first two Stuart Little films (1999–2002, Alan Silvestri); the Sam Raimi Spider-Man Trilogy (2002–2007, Danny Elfman and Christopher Young); The Incredibles and its later sequel (2004-2018, Michael Giacchino); The Princess and the Frog (2009, Randy Newman); Wreck-It Ralph (2012, Henry Jackman); the Star Wars Sequel Trilogy (2015–2019, John Williams), and the Star Wars Rogue One anthology film (2016, Michael Giacchino).

== Taped programs ==
=== Movies ===
- Applause (1929)
- Tarzan Escapes (1936)
- Broadway Melody of 1938 (1937)
- Tarzan Finds a Son! (1939)
- The Wizard of Oz (1939)
- Gone with the Wind (1939)
- The Magnificent Ambersons (1942)
- Ziegfeld Follies (1945)
- Easter Parade (1948)
- Take Me Out to the Ball Game (1949)
- On the Town (1949)
- Cheaper by the Dozen (1950)
- Royal Wedding (1951)
- Singin' in the Rain (1952)
- Les Girls (1957)
- Some Like It Hot (1959)
- North by Northwest (1959)
- Ben-Hur (1959)
- Mutiny on the Bounty (1962)
- The Greatest Story Ever Told (1965)
- The Loved One (1965)
- Westworld (1973)
- Jaws (1975)
- Logan's Run (1976)
- Rocky (1976)
- King Kong (1976)
- Sgt. Pepper's Lonely Hearts Club Band (1978)
- Rocky II (1979)
- Rocky III (1982)
- WarGames (1983)
- Spaceballs (1987)
- The Running Man (1987)
- Rocky V (1990)
- Another You (1991)
- Hook (1991)
- Hero (1992)
- Bram Stoker's Dracula (1992)
- A Few Good Men (1992)
- Last Action Hero (1993)
- Calendar Girl (1993)
- My Life (1993)
- Geronimo: An American Legend (1993)
- Cops & Robbersons (1994)
- Wolf (1994)
- The Net (1995)
- Get Shorty (1995)
- The American President (1995)
- Money Train (1995)
- Nixon (1995)
- The Craft (1996)
- The Cable Guy (1996)
- Matilda (1996)
- High School High (1996)
- Jerry Maguire (1996)
- Starship Troopers (1997)
- My Best Friend's Wedding (1997)
- Men in Black (1997)
- Air Force One (1997)
- Cop Land (1997)
- As Good as It Gets (1997)
- Godzilla (1998)
- I Still Know What You Did Last Summer (1998)
- 8mm (1999)
- Idle Hands (1999)
- Blue Streak (1999)
- Stuart Little (1999)
- Hanging Up (2000)
- What Planet Are You From? (2000)
- What Lies Beneath (2000)
- Hollow Man (2000)
- Cast Away (2000)
- America's Sweethearts (2001)
- Planet of the Apes (2001)
- The Glass House (2001)
- Not Another Teen Movie (2001)
- The Majestic (2001)
- Spider-Man (2002)
- Men in Black II (2002)
- Stuart Little 2 (2002)
- The Ring (2002)
- Identity (2003)
- Charlie's Angels: Full Throttle (2003)
- 50 First Dates (2004)
- 13 Going on 30 (2004)
- Spider-Man 2 (2004)
- Guess Who (2005)
- Bewitched (2005)
- War of the Worlds (2005)
- Zathura: A Space Adventure (2005)
- Click (2006)
- The Holiday (2006)
- Reign Over Me (2007)
- Vacancy (2007)
- Spider-Man 3 (2007)
- Superbad (2007)
- Beowulf (2007)
- First Sunday (2008)
- Prom Night (2008)
- Indiana Jones and the Kingdom of the Crystal Skull (2008)
- You Don't Mess with the Zohan (2008)
- Hancock (2008)
- Step Brothers (2008)
- Pineapple Express (2008)
- Quarantine (2008)
- Bedtime Stories (2008)
- Obsessed (2009)
- Angels & Demons (2009)
- Funny People (2009)
- The Stepfather (2009)
- Alice in Wonderland (2010)
- Iron Man 2 (2010)
- Takers (2010)
- Burlesque (2010)
- The Green Hornet (2011)
- Just Go with It (2011)
- Priest (2011)
- Transformers: Dark of the Moon (2011)
- Friends with Benefits (2011)
- Moneyball (2011)
- The Girl with the Dragon Tattoo (2011)
- The Amazing Spider-Man (2012)
- The Dark Knight Rises (2012)
- Oz the Great and Powerful (2013)
- Star Trek Into Darkness (2013)
- Interstellar (2014)
- Captain Marvel (2019)
- Bullet Train (2022)
- 65 (2023)
- Michael (2026)

=== Dramas ===
- Dallas
- Knots Landing
- Close to Home (2005–2007)
- The Guardian (2001–2004)
- Joan of Arcadia (2003–2005)
- Las Vegas (2003–2008)
- Party of Five (1994–2000)
- Masters of Sex (2013–2016)
- Ray Donovan (2013–2020)
- Insecure (2016–2021)
- Euphoria (2019–2026)
- The Morning Show (2019–present)

=== Game shows ===
- Wheel of Fortune (1995–present, Studio 11)
- Jeopardy! (1994–present, The Alex Trebek Stage; formerly Studio 10)
- Wheel 2000 (1997–1998, Studio 11)
- Jep! (1998–1999, Studio 11)
- Rock & Roll Jeopardy! (1998–2001, Studio 11)
- Hollywood Showdown (2000–2001, Studio 11)
- Pyramid (2002–2004)
- American Gladiators (2008 revival, Season 1 only)
- Are You Smarter than a 5th Grader? (2010–2011)
- Sports Jeopardy! (2014–2016, The Alex Trebek Stage; formerly Studio 10)
- Snoop Dogg Presents The Joker's Wild (2017–2019)
- Jeopardy! The Greatest of All Time (2020, The Alex Trebek Stage; formerly Studio 10)
- Who Wants to Be a Millionaire (2020–2021; 2024–present, Studio 29)
- Celebrity Wheel of Fortune (2021–present, Studio 11)
- The Celebrity Dating Game (2021)
- Jeopardy! National College Championship (2022, The Alex Trebek Stage; formerly Studio 10)
- Celebrity Jeopardy! (2022–present, The Alex Trebek Stage; formerly Studio 10)
- Jeopardy! Masters (2023–present, The Alex Trebek Stage; formerly Studio 10)
- Celebrity Family Feud (2024, Studio 27)
- Pop Culture Jeopardy! (2024–present, The Alex Trebek Stage; formerly Studio 10)
- ESPN Jeopardy! (2026–present, The Alex Trebek Stage; formerly Studio 10)

=== Reality ===
- Shark Tank (2014–2020, 2021–2025)
- The Gong Show (2017–2018)

=== Sitcoms ===
- Perfect Strangers (1986–1993)
- Full House (1987–1993)
- Family Matters (1989–1993)
- Step by Step (1991–1993)
- Married... with Children (1994–1997)
- The King of Queens (1998–2007)
- That's My Bush! (2001)
- Living with Fran (2005–2006)
- Cavemen (2007)
- Rules of Engagement (2007–2013)
- 'Til Death (2006–2010)
- The Goldbergs (2013–2023)
- Dr. Ken (2015–2017)
- One Day at a Time (2017–2020)
- Live in Front of a Studio Audience (2019, 2021)

=== Talk shows ===
- Donny & Marie (1998–2000)
- The Queen Latifah Show (2013–2015)
- Chelsea (2016–2017)

== See also ==
- The Studios at Paramount
- Warner Bros. Studios Burbank
- Universal Studios Lot
- Walt Disney Studios (Burbank)
