= Star Wars Galaxy =

Star Wars Galaxy may refer to:

- Universe of Star Wars, the fictional setting of the Star Wars saga
- Star Wars Galaxies, a Star Wars themed MMORPG platform for Microsoft Windows
  - Star Wars Galaxies: The Ruins of Dantooine, 2003 science fiction novel
- Star Wars Galaxy (comic), a British comic series from Titan Comics
