= Science of Star Wars =

Science of Star Wars may refer to:

- The Science of Star Wars (book), 1999 nonfiction book by Jeanne Cavelos
- Science of Star Wars (miniseries), 2005 TV documentary miniseries aired by the Discovery Channel
