= Star Wars trilogy =

Star Wars trilogy can refer to several Star Wars film trilogies or related works:

== Film trilogies ==
- Star Wars original trilogy, released from 1977 to 1983
- Star Wars prequel trilogy, released from 1999 to 2005
- Star Wars sequel trilogy, released from 2015 to 2019

== Literature ==
=== Star Wars Legends ===
- Thrawn trilogy, by Timothy Zahn, published from 1991 to 1993
- Jedi Academy trilogy, by Kevin J. Anderson, published in 1994
- Corellian trilogy, by Roger MacBride Allen, published in 1995
- Callista trilogy, by Barbara Hambly and Kevin J. Anderson, published from 1995 to 1997
- The Black Fleet Crisis by Michael P. Kube-McDowell, published from 1996 to 1998
- The Han Solo Trilogy, by Ann C. Crispin, published from 1997 to 1998
- The Bounty Hunter Wars, by K. W. Jeter, published in 1998
- The Dark Nest trilogy, by Troy Denning, published in 2005

== Music ==
- The Star Wars Trilogy, a 1983 Varèse Sarabande soundtrack album featuring music by John Williams, conducted by Varujan Kojian with the Utah Symphony Orchestra

== Video games ==
- Star Wars Trilogy (pinball) (1997)
- Star Wars Trilogy Arcade (1998)
- Star Wars Trilogy: Apprentice of the Force (2004), for Game Boy Advance

== See also ==
- Star Wars in other media
