= Luke Skywalker =

Star Wars character

- Star Wars character
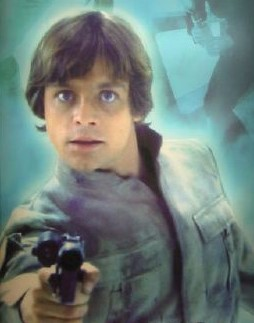
- Mark Hamill as Luke Skywalker (Note: Promotional banner for Star Wars Celebration Europe)
- First appearance: Star Wars: From the Adventures of Luke Skywalker (1976)
- Created by: George Lucas
- Portrayed by: Mark Hamill (Note: Original trilogy Sequel trilogy The Mandalorian The Book of Boba Fett The Star Wars Holiday Special The Muppet Show); Grant Feely (child) (Note: Obi-Wan Kenobi); Aidan Barton (infant) (Note: Revenge of the Sith)
- Voiced by: Various: Mark Hamill (Note: The Star Wars Holiday Special Radio dramas Forces of Destiny Lego Star Wars: Rebuild the Galaxy); Eric Bauza (Note: Various Lego Star Wars productions); Bob Bergen (Note: Various video games); Corey Burton (Note: Read-Along books/records (1979-1983) Rebel Mission to Ord Mantell); Joshua Fardon (Note: Return of the Jedi radio drama); Lloyd Floyd (Note: Various video games Lego Star Wars: The Empire Strikes Out); Anthony Hansen (Note: Star Wars Battlefront); Tom Kane (Note: Lego Star Wars II: The Original Trilogy); Matt Lanter (Note: Star Wars: Smuggler's Gambit); David Menkin (Note: Lego Star Wars: The Skywalker Saga); Matthew Mercer (Note: Star Wars Battlefront II); C. Andrew Nelson (Note: Star Wars: X-Wing); Christopher C. Smith (Note: Phineas and Ferb); Fred Young (Note: Star Wars (pinball game))

In-universe information
- Occupation: Jedi Knight
- Affiliation: Rebel Alliance; Jedi Order; New Republic; New Jedi Order; Resistance
- Family: Shmi Skywalker (grandmother); Anakin Skywalker (father); Padmé Amidala (mother); Leia Organa (sister); Han Solo (brother-in-law); Ben Solo (nephew); Owen Lars (uncle) (Note: Owen and Beru are not Luke's true uncle and aunt, but are relatives by marriage.); Beru Lars (aunt); Others in Legends (Note: Luke's family members in the Star Wars Legends narrative universe include his wife Mara Jade Skywalker, his son Ben Skywalker, his nephews Jacen and Anakin Solo, and his niece Jaina Solo.)
- Masters: Obi-Wan Kenobi; Yoda
- Apprentices: Leia Organa; Ben Solo; Rey; Grogu
- Homeworld: Tatooine

Luke Skywalker is a fictional character in the Star Wars franchise. He was introduced in the original Star Wars film (1977) (Note: The film was originally titled Star Wars, then later retitled Star Wars: Episode IV—A New Hope.) and its novelization (1976). He is the main protagonist of the original trilogy, and also appears in the sequel trilogy. Raised as a moisture farmer on the desert planet Tatooine, Luke joins the Rebel Alliance and becomes a pivotal figure in its struggle against the Galactic Empire. He trains as a Jedi Knight under the Jedi Masters Obi-Wan Kenobi and Yoda, and eventually confronts his father, the Sith Lord Darth Vader. Years later, Luke trains his nephew Ben Solo and mentors the scavenger Rey. Luke is the twin brother of Leia Organa.

Mark Hamill portrays Luke in all the films of the original and sequel trilogies, as well as in the television series The Mandalorian and The Book of Boba Fett. Hamill won the Saturn Award for Best Actor for his portrayal of Luke in The Empire Strikes Back (1980), Return of the Jedi (1983) and The Last Jedi (2017). He was also nominated for the award for his performance in Star Wars (1977). Luke also appears in novels, comics, and video games.

== Creation and development ==
=== Star Wars (1977) ===
George Lucas, the creator of the Star Wars, considered various characterizations for the protagonist of the original Star Wars film. The possibilities included a 60-year-old grizzled war hero, a Jedi Master, a dwarf, and a woman. Luke's original surname was "Starkiller", and it remained in the script until a few months into filming. It was dropped due to what Lucas called "unpleasant connotations" with Charles Manson, who became a "star killer" in 1969 when he murdered the well-known actress Sharon Tate. The association was further informed by former Manson Family member Squeaky Fromme's 1975 assassination attempt against United States president Gerald Ford. Consequently, Lucas replaced the problematic name "Starkiller" with "Skywalker".

=== Return of the Jedi (1983) ===
An alternate ending to the film reportedly featured Luke disappearing into the wilderness "like Clint Eastwood in the spaghetti Westerns."

=== The Force Awakens (2015) ===
During development of the sequel film The Force Awakens, the film's screenwriter Michael Arndt was concerned that Luke's presence would distract from the main protagonist Rey. Therefore, instead of being a major character in the film, Luke became a plot device. Hamill attended script readings, during which he read stage directions instead of dialogue. According to the film's director and co-writer, J. J. Abrams, this allowed Hamill to remain involved, and his presence enhanced the readings for everyone. Lucas stated that, in his original plans for the sequel trilogy, Luke would have begun rebuilding the Jedi Order several years after Return of the Jedi. According to Lucas, only about 50 to 100 surviving Jedi would have answered his call, leading Luke to train a new generation of Jedi from children as young as two or three years old over the course of approximately twenty years. By the end of the trilogy, Luke's efforts to rebuild the Jedi Order would have been largely complete.

== Portrayal ==
Mark Hamill was originally cast as Luke for Star Wars (1977). Other actors who auditioned for the role include Robby Benson, William Katt, Kurt Russell, and Charles Martin Smith. In January 1977, after filming was completed, Hamill was injured in a car accident. He fractured his nose and cheekbone, which caused scarring on his face. Lucas justified the change in Hamill's appearance in The Empire Strikes Back (1980) by asserting that between the two films, Luke had been fighting for the Rebel Alliance and had sustained injuries. It was speculated that the wampa attack at the beginning of The Empire Strikes Back was created to explain Luke's facial scarring, but Lucas disputed this in the DVD commentary of the film.

== Appearances ==
=== Original trilogy ===
==== Star Wars ====
Luke was introduced in Star Wars (1977), the first film of the original trilogy. He is portrayed by Mark Hamill in all three films of the trilogy. At the beginning of the film, Luke is living on a moisture farm on the desert planet Tatooine with his uncle Owen and aunt Beru. After his uncle purchases the droids C-3PO and R2-D2, Luke finds a message from Princess Leia of Alderaan inside R2-D2. When R2-D2 goes missing, Luke goes out to search for the droid, and is saved from Tusken Raiders by Obi-Wan Kenobi, an elderly hermit. R2-D2 plays the message from Leia, in which she asks Obi-Wan to help her defeat the Galactic Empire. Obi-Wan says that he and Luke's father were once Jedi Knights, and that Luke's father was murdered by a traitorous Jedi named Darth Vader. Obi-Wan presents Luke with his father's lightsaber and offers to take him to Alderaan and train him in the ways of the Force. Luke declines his offer, feeling obligated to his family's farm.

Luke changes his mind when he finds that Imperial stormtroopers have killed his aunt and uncle. He and Obi-Wan travel to Mos Eisley, where they meet the smugglers Han Solo and Chewbacca. They hire the duo to take them to Alderaan on the Millennium Falcon, only to discover that it has been destroyed by the Death Star, the Empire's battle station. The Falcon is brought to the Death Star via tractor beam, and Luke and Han disguise themselves as stormtroopers to infiltrate the station. When they discover Leia is being held captive, Luke persuades Han and Chewbacca to help rescue her. Obi-Wan deactivates the tractor beam, then sacrifices his life in a duel with Vader so the others can escape. Luke joins the Rebel Alliance and pilots an X-wing during the Battle of Yavin. He and other Rebels attempt to destroy the Death Star by launching torpedoes into an exhaust port. As he approaches the port, Luke hears Obi-Wan's voice, telling him to trust his feelings. He switches off his ship's missile guidance system, instead using the Force to guide the torpedoes. After destroying the Death Star, Luke receives a medal of honor from Leia.

==== The Empire Strikes Back ====
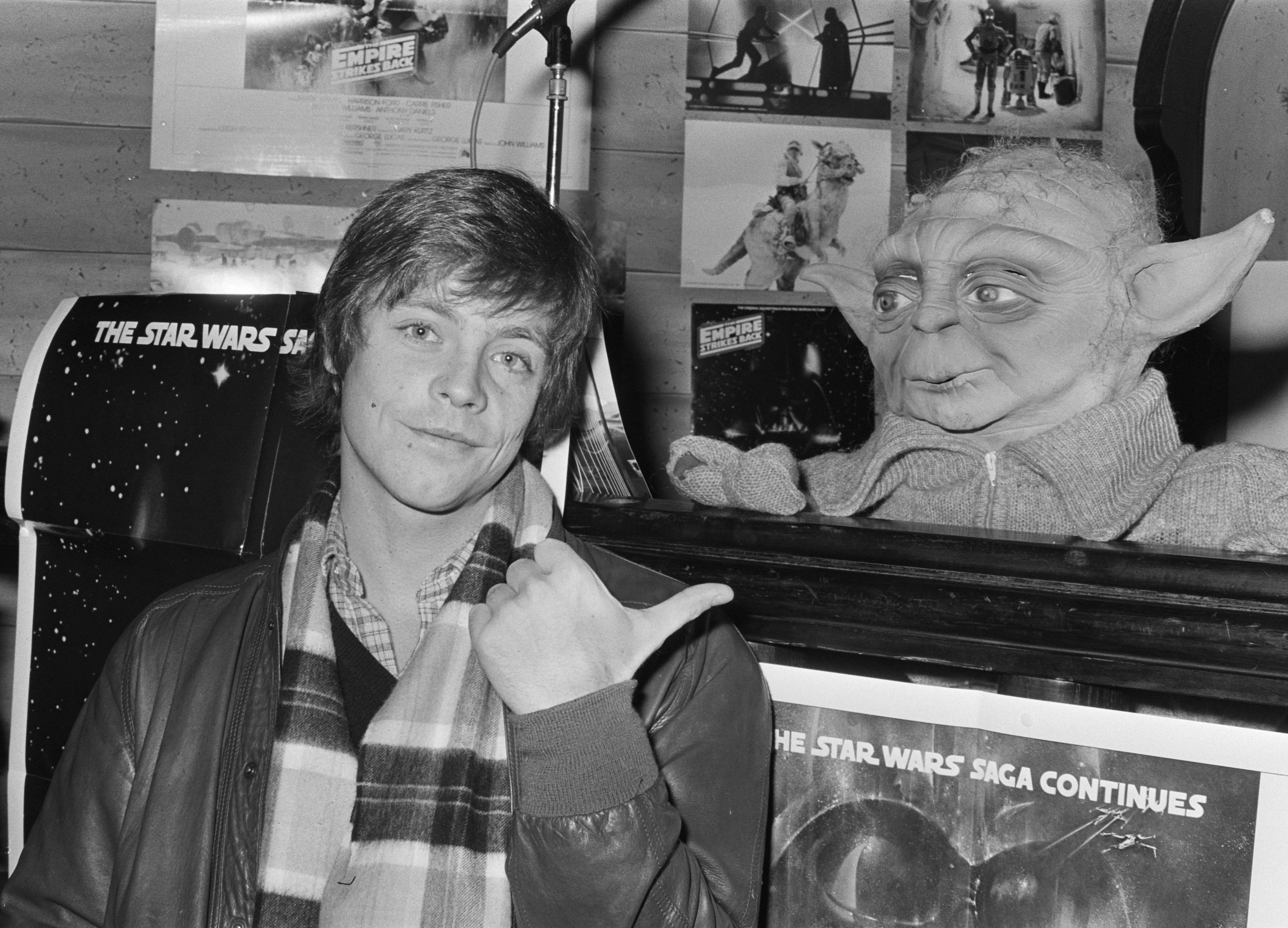
Mark Hamill in 1980

Luke returns in The Empire Strikes Back (1980). Three years after the destruction of the Death Star, Luke is now a commander in the Rebel Alliance. While on the ice planet Hoth, he is captured by a wampa, but manages to escape. Obi-Wan appears to him as a Force spirit and urges him to complete his training with the Jedi Master Yoda. When the Empire discovers the Rebel base, Luke leads a squadron of snowspeeders against the opposing AT-AT walkers, but is forced to retreat. After escaping in his X-wing, he travels to Dagobah and meets Yoda. He undergoes rigorous Jedi training, quickly expanding his Force abilities.

While on Dagobah, Luke has a vision of his friends in danger. Against the advice of both Obi-Wan and Yoda to stay and complete his training, he travels to Cloud City to help them, unwittingly falling into a trap set by Vader. He engages in a lightsaber duel with Vader, and is overpowered. After severing Luke's hand, Vader reveals that he is Luke's father, and invites him to join the dark side of the Force and rule the galaxy with him. Luke throws himself into a chasm, and finds himself on the underside of Cloud City. Hanging onto a slender rod, he uses the Force to contact Leia, who is leaving in the Falcon. She hears his plea, and Chewbacca turns the ship around to rescue him. After Luke returns to the Rebel fleet, his severed hand is replaced with a bio-mechanical one.

==== Return of the Jedi ====
A year later, Luke is a Jedi Knight and has constructed his own lightsaber. At the beginning of Return of the Jedi (1983), he returns to Tatooine with Leia, Chewbacca and Lando Calrissian to rescue Han, who was frozen in carbonite and delivered to the crime lord Jabba the Hutt. Luke offers to negotiate with Jabba, who rejects his offer and imprisons him with a giant beast called a rancor. When Luke kills the rancor, Jabba decides to execute him, Han and Chewbacca by casting them into a Sarlacc pit. Luke escapes with R2-D2's help, saving his friends and destroying Jabba's sail barge. Luke returns to Dagobah, where he learns from a dying Yoda that Vader is indeed his father. Luke is then informed by Obi-Wan's spirit that he has a twin sister, whom he realizes is Leia. Both Yoda and Obi-Wan tell Luke that he must face Vader again to finish his training and save the galaxy, but he is disturbed by the idea of killing his father.

While his companions undertake a mission on Endor, Luke surrenders to Vader in an attempt to bring him back from the dark side. Vader takes his son to the second Death Star and brings him before the Emperor, who attempts to seduce him to the dark side. Luke lashes out at the Emperor with his lightsaber, but Vader blocks his strike, and the two of them duel once again. As Luke regains control of his emotions, Vader senses that he has a sister, and threatens to turn her to the dark side if Luke will not submit. Enraged, Luke overpowers Vader and severs his hand. The Emperor then orders Luke to kill Vader and take his place, but Luke refuses. The Emperor begins torturing Luke with Force lightning, and Luke calls out to his father for help. Vader hesitates, then throws the Emperor down a reactor shaft to his death. Mortally wounded, Vader asks his son to remove his mask, which allows Luke to look upon the face of Anakin Skywalker for the first time. On Endor, Luke burns his father's body on a funeral pyre. As the Rebels celebrate the destruction of the Death Star and the fall of the Empire, Luke sees Anakin's spirit appear alongside the spirits of Obi-Wan and Yoda.

=== Revenge of the Sith ===
In the prequel film Revenge of the Sith (2005), Padmé Amidala gives birth to the twins Luke and Leia and then dies. Obi-Wan and Yoda agree to separate the twins in order to protect them from their father, Vader, and the newly created Galactic Empire. Obi-Wan takes Luke to the desert planet Tatooine, where he is adopted by Vader's stepbrother, Owen Lars, and his wife Beru. Leia is adopted by Senator Bail Organa of Alderaan. Both infants are portrayed by Aidan Barton, the son of Roger Barton, an editor of the film.

=== Sequel trilogy ===
Luke Skywalker, as portrayed by Mark Hamill in Star Wars: The Last Jedi (2017)

The first film of the sequel trilogy, The Force Awakens (2015), occurs thirty years after the destruction of the second Death Star. Hamill reprises his role as Luke in all three films. The opening crawl of The Force Awakens reveals that Luke disappeared after his nephew and Jedi apprentice, Ben Solo, turned to the dark side and became Kylo Ren, a warlord of the First Order. The Resistance, led by Leia, manage to locate Luke on the planet Ahch-To; the Force-sensitive scavenger Rey then travels to the planet and offers him his lightsaber. At the beginning of The Last Jedi (2017), Luke tosses the lightsaber aside. He refuses to talk to Rey, but eventually inquires about his family. Rey tells him about Han Solo's death at the hands of his son Ren, and explains that the First Order now rules the galaxy. She asks Luke to train her in the ways of the Force, but he is reluctant. He tells her it is time for the Jedi Order to end.

Luke eventually begins instructing Rey, but he is afraid of her power. He tells her the history of the Jedi Order, and how Darth Sidious rose to power. He claims the Jedi were partly responsible for his father's fall to the dark side. Luke admits that he briefly considered killing his nephew after seeing a vision of the destruction he could cause; when Ben woke to see Luke with his lightsaber drawn, he felt betrayed and left his training. Rey urges Luke to help her redeem Ben, but he refuses. When Rey leaves, Luke tries to burn the Jedi temple, but fails. He is then visited by the spirit of Yoda, who assures him that he still has a purpose. Later, Luke appears on Crait, where the Resistance is besieged. He apologizes to Leia for allowing Ben to fall to the dark side, then steps in front of the First Order forces. He survives an onslaught of blaster fire, then engages Ren in lightsaber combat. Ren seemingly cuts through him, but Luke is unharmed; he is still on Ahch-To, having used the Force to project himself to Crait. He then collapses and becomes one with the Force. His battle with Ren gave the Resistance time to escape the planet.

Luke returns in the final film of the trilogy, The Rise of Skywalker (2019). After Rey defeats Ren in a lightsaber duel, she flies his TIE fighter to Ahch-To, then burns the ship. When she throws Luke's lightsaber into the flames, he appears as a Force spirit and catches it. He reprimands her for treating the weapon with disrespect, and admits he was wrong not to participate in the Resistance. He thanks Rey for helping him rediscover himself, and urges her to continue her battle against the Sith. He gives her Leia's lightsaber and his X-wing for her journey to Exegol. After Rey vanquishes Sidious, she visits the moisture farm where Luke was raised. When a passerby asks Rey who she is, she notices the spirits of Luke and Leia nearby, and replies "Rey Skywalker."

=== Series ===
Hamill portrays Luke in "Chapter 16: The Rescue", the season two finale of the live-action series The Mandalorian. The Force-sensitive infant Grogu had contacted him in a previous episode, and Luke now arrives to collect him and begin his Jedi training. Luke also destroys a group of Dark Troopers that were threatening Grogu and his guardian, Din Djarin.

The series The Book of Boba Fett features Hamill as Luke in the episode "Chapter 6: From the Desert Comes a Stranger". While training Grogu, Luke helps him remember some of his past, including his home at the Jedi Temple on Coruscant and the events of the Great Jedi Purge. Soon after, Djarin sends Luke a gift for Grogu: beskar chain mail forged by the Armorer. Unsure whether Grogu is committed to the Jedi path, Luke decides to let the child choose his own destiny. He invites him to choose between the chain mail and a lightsaber that belonged to Yoda. In "Chapter 7: In The Name of Honor", it is revealed that Grogu chose the chain mail, which leads Luke to send him back to Djarin.

Luke appears in two episodes of the animated web series Forces of Destiny, voiced by Hamill. The episode "The Path Ahead" details his training with Yoda on Dagobah. In "Traps and Tribulations", he and Leia help the Ewoks stop a rampaging beast known as a Gorax. Grant Feely portrays Luke as a ten-year-old child in the series Obi-Wan Kenobi (2022).

=== Novels and comics ===
The 2015 novel Heir to the Jedi takes place between Star Wars and The Empire Strikes Back, and chronicles the adventures of Luke as he continues to battle the Empire with his Rebel companions. He grows close with Nakari Kelen, a fellow Rebel, and he begins to develop his Force abilities. The novel is written from the first-person perspective of Luke, and is only the second Star Wars novel to utilize this type of narrative voice. (Note: The first was the 1997 Michael A. Stackpole novel I, Jedi.) Luke is featured in the junior novel The Legends of Luke Skywalker, which was adapted as a manga. He also appears in the 2015 comic Star Wars, which is set between the films of the original trilogy. The 2022 novel Shadow of the Sith, which is set between Return of the Jedi and The Force Awakens, follows Luke and Lando Calrissian as they search for Exegol.

=== Other ===
Mark Hamill appears as Luke in the live-action segments of The Star Wars Holiday Special (1978) and in a 1980 episode of The Muppet Show titled The Stars of Star Wars. (Note: Attributed to multiple references:) Hamill provides Luke's voice in the radio adaptations of Star Wars (1981) and The Empire Strikes Back (1983), while Joshua Fardon voices him in the Return of the Jedi radio drama. Luke also appears in video games, in which he is voiced by a variety of different actors.

Luke was added to Fortnite on November 2022 during their promotional Star Wars week.

== Star Wars Legends ==
Following the acquisition of Lucasfilm by The Walt Disney Company in 2012, most of the licensed Star Wars novels and comics produced between 1977 and 2014 were rebranded as Star Wars Legends and declared non-canon to the franchise. The Legends works comprise a separate narrative universe. (Note: Attributed to multiple references:)

=== Novels ===
The novel The Truce at Bakura (1997) takes place one day after the Battle of Endor. Luke and his friend Wedge Antilles recover a message droid from the planet Bakura, which is being invaded by the Ssi-Ruuk. Luke turns back the army and meets Dev Sibwarra, a Force-sensitive human who had been captured by the Ssi-Ruuk. Sibwarra is eventually killed after turning against his captors. The Courtship of Princess Leia (1995) is set four years after the Battle of Endor. Luke travels to the planet Dathomir, where he encounters the Force-sensitive Witches of Dathomir. He discovers a prophecy stating that a Jedi will change the way of life on Dathomir, and he eventually realizes what the Force truly is. Luke destroys most of the Nightsisters—a group of dark-side witches—and their leader Gethzirion. He also terminates Zsinj, the galaxy's most powerful warlord. Luke recovers Jedi records left by Yoda roughly 400 years prior, then decides to start a new Jedi Academy.

In the Thrawn trilogy, Luke meets Mara Jade, the former Emperor's Hand who is bound by Palpatine's disembodied voice that repeatedly commands "You will kill Luke Skywalker". Although she was ready to terminate Luke to stop the voice, she keeps him alive so he can help her escape from danger. Despite her threats, Luke learns about the spell Mara is under and vows to free her from it. Later, Luke and Mara fight against Luke's clone, Luuke Skywalker, a creation of Joruus C'baoth. Mara destroys the clone and eliminates C'baoth with help from Leia. Mara's curse is then silenced.

Luke resigns his commission in the New Republic starfighter corps in the Jedi Academy trilogy. He turns his attention to his Jedi studies and begins to rebuild the Jedi Order in the Massassi Temple on Yavin 4, a decision some anti-Jedi politicians use against him. He is forced to contend with the spirit of the ancient Sith Lord Exar Kun, who lures one of his most powerful students, Kyp Durron, to the dark side. In the Hand of Thrawn Duology, Luke is a Jedi Master. He works again with Mara, who has gained knowledge of the Force since her training at Luke's Jedi Academy. Luke falls in love with her and they eventually marry. In Edge of Victory: Rebirth, they have a son whom they name Ben, after Obi-Wan's alias.

Luke creates a New Jedi Council in the New Jedi Order series. He envisions a conclave composed of Jedi, politicians and military officers. In Force Heretic: Remnant, he spearheads a mission to the Unknown Regions during the Yuuzhan Vong invasion to find the mysterious planet Zonama Sekot, which creates living starships. After the invaders are defeated, Luke leads the New Jedi Order on Denon, the temporary capital of the Galactic Alliance.

In The Swarm War, the Order moves to Ossus, the site of Jedi temples and libraries that were mostly destroyed 4,000 years prior. Upon the Killik's invasion of Chiss space and the transformation of most of the Myrkr mission survivors into Killik Joiners, Luke deduces that the Killik's collective mind is being unconsciously controlled by a hive called the Dark Nest. The hive, in turn, is controlled by a former Nightsister named Lomi Plo, who became the Unseen Queen through her ability to become invisible by exploiting the doubts of inferiors. One of the Myrkr survivors, Alema Rar, suggests to Luke that Mara may be responsible for the death of his mother. Luke almost believes the lie due to Mara's previous role as the Emperor's Hand. His doubts are assuaged when he discovers several hologram recordings hidden in R2-D2's memory. He sees his father Force-choking his mother on Mustafar, as well as his own birth and his mother's death. Luke defeats Lomi Plo in the final battle of the Swarm War, cutting her into four pieces.

In the Legacy of the Force series, a schism develops between Luke and his nephew, Jacen Solo. Already a powerful Jedi, Jacen has begun adopting radical interpretations of the Force, which causes a dramatic change in his personality and makes Luke afraid that he will fall to the dark side. During this time, Luke begins having visions of a dark figure destroying the galaxy and the Jedi. The situation worsens in Bloodlines, when Luke's son Ben becomes Jacen's apprentice. In Tempest, Luke determines that the figure from his visions is Lumiya, a former Emperor's Hand now known as the "Dark Lady of the Sith".

When Mara is murdered in Sacrifice, Lumiya convinces Luke that she killed her. They battle, and Luke saves Lumiya from falling to her death so that he can kill her himself. However, he later realizes that Lumiya could not have killed Mara. He breaks down over the death of his wife, knowing that her murderer is still at large. He does not realize that the killer is Jacen, who has taken the Sith name Darth Caedus. In Revelation, Ben proves that Jacen killed Mara, but Luke is reluctant to destroy Jacen, fearing that he or Ben may fall to the dark side in the process. The decision is taken out of his hands in Invincible, when Jaina kills Jacen in a lightsaber duel.

The Fate of the Jedi novels are set about forty years after the original Star Wars film. Now in his sixties, Luke is deposed from his position as Grand Master and exiled from Coruscant. He will be allowed to return if he can discover why Jacen fell to the dark side. Luke and Ben embark on a journey together, exploring dangerous and little-known parts of the galaxy. They learn about each other, about the Force, and about the great dangers threatening the Jedi. The love between them grows greater as they repeatedly save each other's lives.

The Matthew Stover novel Luke Skywalker and the Shadows of Mindor (2008) takes place shortly after Return of the Jedi and the novel Prophets of the Dark Side. Luke and the Rebel Alliance are attempting to stop Lord Shadowspawn and his "shadow stormtroopers", a struggle which culminates in the Battle of Mindor. Stover said Shadows of Mindor was meant to evoke Brian Daley's Han Solo novels, which are Stover's favorite Star Wars books.

=== Comics ===
Luke appears in the Marvel-published comic adaptations of the original trilogy, as well as an ongoing series that ran from 1977 to 1986. He also appears in numerous titles released by Dark Horse Comics, including Star Wars: Legacy. In this series, which takes place 125 years after the events of the original trilogy, Luke appears to his descendant Cade Skywalker as a Force spirit. He persuades Cade to once again become a Jedi in order to defeat Darth Krayt and his burgeoning Sith Empire.

== Reception ==
Some Star Wars fans have expressed disappointment with the depiction of Luke in The Last Jedi, a film which was directed by Rian Johnson. According to Digital Spy, the central complaint is that Luke appears to be "a grumpy old man whose failures [have] driven him into hiding". Before the film's release, Mark Hamill said that he "pretty much fundamentally disagree[d] with every choice" Johnson had made for Luke Skywalker. He nevertheless told Johnson that it was his job "to take what you've created and do my best to realize your vision." Hamill later said that he regretted publicly expressing his disagreement. Marcia Lucas, the Academy Award-winning film editor of the original Star Wars trilogy, criticized the sequel trilogy's treatment of Luke Skywalker, stating that "they have Luke disintegrate" and "They killed Luke Skywalker."

== Family tree ==
Skywalker family tree

Aika Lars (Note: Appears in Pablo Hidalgo's Star Wars Character Encyclopedia: Updated and Expanded (2016))
Beru Whitesun

Cliegg Lars
Owen Lars

Shmi Skywalker-Lars
Anakin Skywalker; Darth Vader
Luke Skywalker

Jobal Naberrie (Note: Attack of the Clones (2002) and Revenge of the Sith (2005))	Ruwee Naberrie
Padmé Amidala	Bail Organa
Leia Organa	Han Solo
Ben Solo; Kylo Ren

House of Organa
Breha Organa

== See also ==
- Skywalker family
