= Galactic Empire =

Fictional state in the Star Wars franchise

- Star Wars organization
- Emblem and Flag of the Galactic Empire

In-universe information
- Other names: Old Empire; First Galactic Empire
- Type: Absolute monarchy; (de facto 19 BBY to 0 BBY // de jure 0 BBY to 4 ABY)
- Founded: 19 BBY from the Galactic Republic
- Defunct: 4 ABY: fractured into the Imperial remnants during the Battle of Endor; 5 ABY: dissolved after the Battle of Jakku, succeeded by the New Republic; By 21 ABY: partly reorganized (29 ABY: publicly formed) into the First Order
- Location: Galaxy
- Leader: Galactic Emperor: Emperor Palpatine aka Darth Sidious (19 BBY–4 ABY) (Note: The following, (disputed) commissionary heads of the Galactic Empire, Mas Amedda (4 ABY–5 ABY), Rae Sloane (5 ABY) and Gallius Rax (5 ABY), were not called Emperors and did not hold full powers.); Leader of the Contingency: (Note: Which later becomes the First Order.): Mas Amedda (4–5 ABY) (Emperor de jure); Gallius Rax (5 ABY) (Counselor to the Empire); Rae Sloane (5 ABY); Legislative: Imperial Senate (19–0 BBY); Judicial: Imperial Supreme Tribunal (19–4 ABY); Executive: Imperial Ruling Council (19 BBY–4 ABY); Imperial High Command (19 BBY–4 ABY); Council of Moffs (14 BBY–4 ABY); Imperial Future Council (4 ABY); Shadow Council (5 ABY, 9 ABY)
- Key people: Mas Amedda; Moff Gideon; Grand Inquisitor; Mara Jade; Orson Krennic; Mitth'raw'nuruodo; Sheev Palpatine; Wilhuff Tarkin; Darth Vader
- Affiliations: Sith Order; Sith Empire (precursor); Stormtroopers
- Enemies: Jedi Order; Rebel Alliance; Grysk
- Currency: Galactic Standard Credit (Imperial Dataries)
- Capital: Coruscant (Senate District, Imperial Center)
- Official language: Imperial Basic

The Galactic Empire, also known simply as the Empire, is a fictional autocracy featured in the Star Wars franchise. Introduced in the 1977 film Star Wars, it is the main antagonistic faction of the original trilogy, which also includes The Empire Strikes Back (1980) and Return of the Jedi (1983).

The Galactic Empire is portrayed as an anthropocentric, (Note: In the Star Wars universe, not all people are humans.) imperialist, and bureaucratic dictatorship which seeks absolute rule and social control over every planet and civilization within the Star Wars galaxy ("the Galaxy"). The Empire pursues these goals by various means, including intimidation, coercion, expropriation, power projection, state terrorism, ethnic cleansing, and genocide.

The Galactic Empire's rise was not the result of a revolution or coup, but rather the culmination of gradual erosion of galactic institutions through the end of the Clone Wars, when Palpatine, the Supreme Chancellor of the Galactic Republic, launched a self-coup. At its peak, the Galactic Empire sprawls over much of the Galaxy, which consists of millions of planetary systems and billions more fringe colonies, shipyards, fortress worlds, and outer territories.

In an attempt to destroy the Jedi and gain political power, Palpatine—secretly the Sith Lord Darth Sidious—falsely accuses the Jedi of inciting the secessionist Clone Wars. After manipulating the Galactic Senate into using clone troopers created during the conflict to purge the Jedi, Palpatine reorganizes the Republic into a state meant to "ensure the security and continuing stability, and a safe and secure society": the Galactic Empire, with himself as Emperor. The Senate overwhelmingly supports this decision and lauds his apparent resolve, bravery, and selflessness.

With Emperor Palpatine keeping mostly to the shadows, his Sith apprentice Darth Vader maintains a more public presence and leads the Imperial forces as a personification of the Galactic Empire's power. The completed construction of the Death Star, a planet-destroying battle station, ultimately empowers Emperor Palpatine to dissolve the Imperial Senate and transfer power to Praetor-officers called Imperial Moffs, such as Grand Moff Tarkin. But by the time of Episode IV – A New Hope, revolutionary insurgents organized the Rebel Alliance as a united front to overthrow what had become a totalitarian regime.

The Galactic Empire largely collapses following the events of Return of the Jedi, with its remnants forming a rump state as the First Order in the sequel trilogy, set 30 years later.

== Appearances in chronological order ==
- Star Wars: Episode III – Revenge of the Sith (2005)
- Star Wars: The Clone Wars (2008–2020) (Briefly)
- Star Wars: The Bad Batch (2021–2024)
- Star Wars: Maul – Shadow Lord (2026–present)
- Tales of the Empire (2024)
- Solo: A Star Wars Story (2018)
- Obi-Wan Kenobi (2022)
- Andor (2022–2025)
- Star Wars Rebels (2014–2018)
- Rogue One: A Star Wars Story (2016)
- Star Wars: Episode IV – A New Hope (1977) (First appearance)
- Star Wars: Episode V – The Empire Strikes Back (1980)
- Star Wars: Episode VI – Return of the Jedi (1983)
- The Mandalorian (2019–2023) (Remnants)
- Ahsoka (2023–present) (Remnants)
- The Mandalorian and Grogu (2026) (Remnants)
- Star Wars Resistance (2018–2020) (Reunited into the First Order)
- Star Wars: Episode VII – The Force Awakens (2015) (As the First Order)
- Star Wars: Episode VIII – The Last Jedi (2017) (As the First Order)
- Star Wars: Episode IX – The Rise of Skywalker (2019) (Reorganized into the Final Order)

== Historical influences ==
=== Nazi Germany ===
Star Wars creator George Lucas sought to make the First Galactic Empire evoke aesthetic and thematic parallels to Nazi Germany and European fascism.

Similar to Nazi Germany, the Galactic Empire is a dictatorship based on rigid control of society, which dissolved a previous imperfect democratic republic, and is led by an all-powerful supreme ruler. The Empire, like the Nazis, desires the creation of a supremacist totalitarian order and engages in state terrorism and crimes against humanity to achieve such ends.

The uniforms of Imperial officers take partial inspiration from Nazi uniforms. The title of the Empire's main soldiers, the stormtroopers, is somewhat similar to the name given to the Sturmabteilung (SA, "storm department") paramilitary volunteer units loyal to the Nazi party. Further, the flag of the Galactic Empire closely resembles the Nazi German flag, with a black symbol placed within a white circle, on a red background.

The visual appearance of Darth Vader in his all-black uniform combined with his fanatical obedience to Palpatine alludes to the Schutzstaffel (SS), and particularly Heinrich Himmler's loyalty to Adolf Hitler. According to a Lucasfilm-authorized source, Darth Vader's relationship with Palpatine is akin to SS leader Heinrich Himmler's relationship with Hitler.

=== United States ===
Lucas has also indicated that the Galactic Empire's struggle against a smaller guerrilla force was inspired by American imperialism in the Vietnam War and his surprise at the relative lack of anti-war voices in the United States.

=== Roman Empire ===
Palpatine has been compared to various political strongmen, but especially Augustus Caesar. Many key events in the Star Wars universe mirror the consolidation of power and imperial expansion of the Roman Empire under Augustus:

Palpatine	Augustus Caesar
Manipulated the Galactic Senate	Manipulated the Roman Senate
Cited corruption in the Galactic Senate hampering the head of state to legitimize authoritarian rule	Cited corruption in the Roman Senate hampering the head of state to legitimize authoritarian rule
Pressured the Galactic Senate to grant emergency powers as Supreme Chancellor to address a crisis	Pressured the Roman Senate to grant emergency powers as Consul of the Republic to address a crisis
Falsely promised to relinquish emergency powers once the crisis ended	Falsely promised to relinquish emergency powers once the crisis ended
Oversaw the transition from the Galactic Republic to the Galactic Empire, backed by strong control of military force	Oversaw the transition from the Roman Republic to the Roman Empire, backed by strong control of military force

=== Soviet Union ===
The various military personnel and TIE Fighters that are flying in formation as Palpatine arrives on the second Death Star in Return of the Jedi. According to Lucas, the ceremony for the Emperor's arrival was inspired by October Revolution Day military parades in the Soviet Union.

=== British Empire ===
Many Imperial officers speak with the Received Pronunciation accent (known in-universe as Coruscanti), which is associated with social prestige in British English. This is partly because Irvin Kershner "deliberately cast British actors as the high-rank imperials for The Empire Strikes Back to mirror the composition of the American [R]evolution [against the British Empire], with the rebels mostly Americans".

=== Others ===
The uniforms of Imperial military officers bear resemblance to those of 19th-century Polish ulans (mounted lancers)—who wore tunics, riding breeches, and boots like the Empire's officers wear.

The Imperial officers' cap resembles the field caps historically worn by troops of the German Empire and the Austro-Hungarian Empire.

== Depiction ==
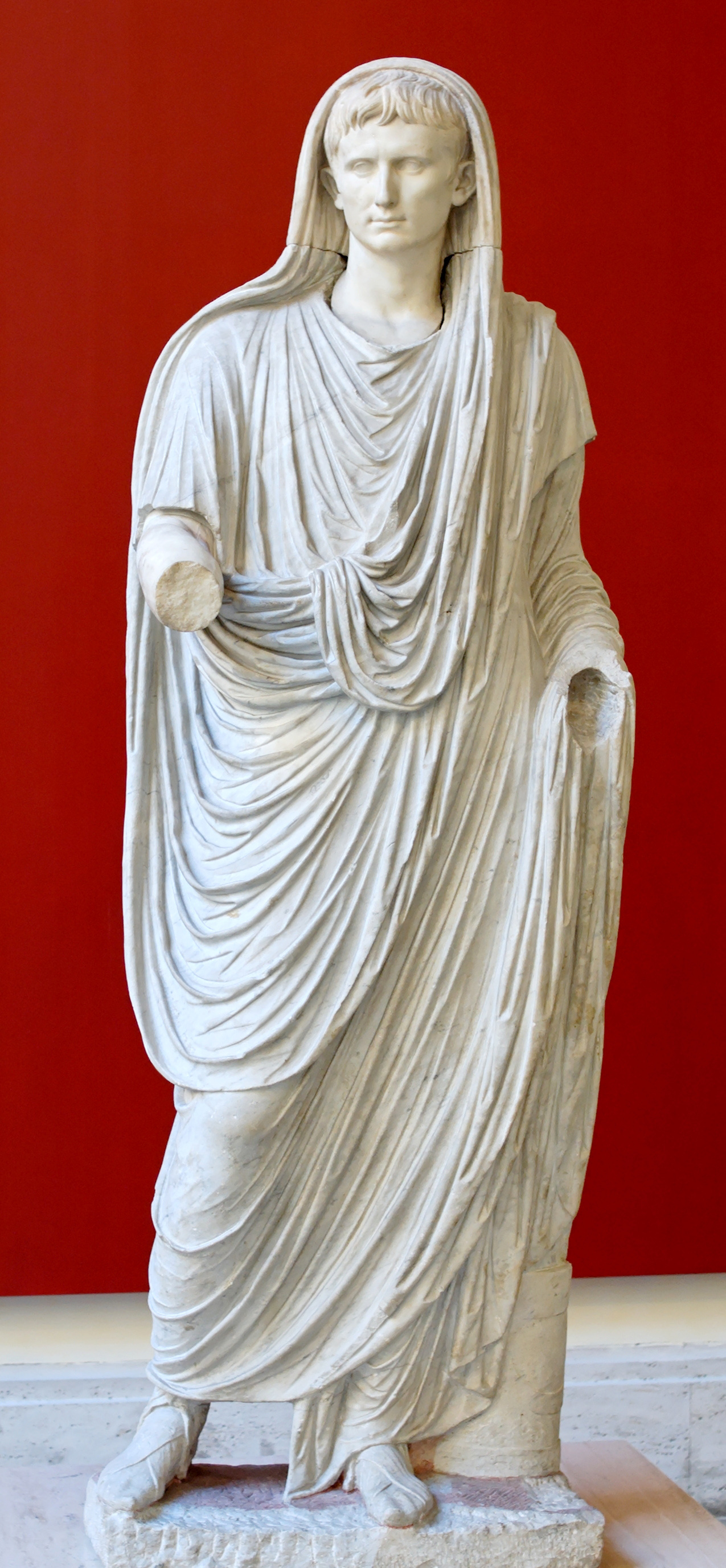
Augustus in the robes and cloak of his position as Pontifex Maximus, served as inspiration in the creation of the character Palpatine.

=== Origins ===
Note: All dates in this article are in the BBY/ABY format. This is a fictional in-universe dating system centred on the Battle of Yavin in Episode IV: A New Hope in which the first Death Star is destroyed. BBY is Before the Battle of Yavin; ABY is After the Battle of Yavin.

==== The Twilight of the Republic ====
The Galactic Empire is born out of the collapsing Galactic Republic; the rise of the Empire wasn't sudden but instead unfolded gradually, step by step with one power grab after the next. However, its seeds are planted and nurtured by the Sith over a period of centuries. The Clone Wars, the epic war between the Republic and the Separatist Confederacy of Independent Systems (CIS) depicted in Episode II: Attack of the Clones and Episode III: Revenge of the Sith represents the fruit of those labors. The traditional checks and balances failed completely because the Sith systematically dismantled the legal guardrails of the government. Palpatine's ascension came with the final layer of poison instilled into a governmental system on the brink of collapse. The hubristic Jedi, corrupt senate and civil war led many to see Palpatine as a savior; he is easily able to take near-complete control of the Republic.

In Episode I: The Phantom Menace, amid a trade dispute and invasion of his homeworld of Naboo, Senator Palpatine convinces Queen Padmé Amidala to call for a vote of no confidence in Supreme Chancellor of the Republic Finis Valorum. Palpatine is elected Supreme Chancellor in Valorum's place.

==== The Clone Wars ====
As the Separatists Crisis intensifies into a galactic conventional war with the Battle of Geonosis, in Episode II, the Galactic Senate, the legislature of the Republic, grants Palpatine emergency powers to deal with the crisis. Palpatine promises safety at the cost of individual freedoms, all while tightening his own control over every facet of society; he promises to relinquish his powers once peace and order are restored. His first emergency order creates a massive army of clone troopers. His second emergency order conscripts the Jedi as commissioned officers of the Grand Army of the Republic (GAR) armed forces; by seizing influence over the Jedi Council, Palpatine indirectly takes command of the GAR. His third emergency order nationalizes the military-industrial and financial sectors to finance the war effort. He intentionally prolongs and exploits the Clone Wars to amass unprecedented political power, using his apprentice Darth Tyranus, Head of State of the Confederacy of Independent Systems, as a pawn to keep everyone distracted and focused on ending the war.

By the time of Episode III, he is effectively a dictator who overstayed his term limits; he exploits the people's fears, systematically rewrites constitutional laws and crushes the institutions that threaten his goals. He orchestrates his own kidnapping by the Separatists by leaking classified information, thereby bringing the war to the capital, Coruscant, to further spread terror. The Jedi are overstretched across the galaxy trying to end the war; they distrust Palpatine's motives, fearing he has come under the influence of a Dark Lord of the Sith named Darth Sidious. Their concerns are shared by more than 2,000 loyalist, pro-democracy senators who suspect Palpatine may not return his emergency powers once the war ends. These senators set into motion plans that will eventually lead to the creation of the Rebellion. The film reveals that Palpatine and Sidious are one and the same, and Palpatine engineered the conflicts as a false flag.

==== The Purge ====
Palpatine reveals himself as a Sith Lord to Jedi Knight Anakin Skywalker, promising to save Padmé, Skywalker's secret wife, from dying in childbirth as Anakin has foreseen. Skywalker reports Palpatine's true identity to the Jedi Council.

However, when Jedi Master Mace Windu confronts Palpatine, Anakin comes to Palpatine's aid and helps him kill Windu. Desperate to save Padmé, Anakin pledges himself to the dark side of the Force and becomes Palpatine's third apprentice, Darth Vader. Palpatine declares the Jedi to be traitors, providing "irrefutable evidence" that they were the instigating masterminds behind the Clone Wars, and all but exterminates the Jedi Order in a galaxy-wide slaughter, while sending Vader to kill everyone in the Jedi Temple and assassinate the Separatist leaders. Vader then immediately ends the Clone Wars by transmitting deactivation codes to all Separatist droids in the galaxy.

Two remaining Jedi, Obi-Wan Kenobi and Yoda, mount a counterattack. Obi-Wan defeats Vader and leaves him for dead, but Yoda's duel with Palpatine ends in a stalemate; both Jedi flee into exile. Grievously wounded, Vader is rescued by Palpatine and fitted with cybernetics and a black suit of armor with a life-support system. After Padmé dies giving birth to twins, Yoda and Obi-Wan decide to separate the children – Luke and Leia – to hide them from the Sith. Luke goes to Vader's stepfamily on Tatooine, while Leia is adopted by Senator Bail Organa of Alderaan.

==== The New Order ====
Having "won" the war, with GAR liberators occupying every known star system, Palpatine orders them to annex planets, suppress the sectors and subjugate the people. Secure in his power and position, with no one left to stop him, Palpatine reorganizes the Republic into the Galactic Empire, with himself as Emperor for life. He moves on to his final political opposition, the Senate; rather than dismantling it outright, he reduces it to a powerless symbol that exists only as an illusion of representation, and as an echo chamber for his rhetoric. Senators with no dedication to public service are bribed or coerced into rubber-stamping Palpatine's policy; the remaining pro-democracy senators are spied upon, arrested, extorted, assassinated, or otherwise made to resign and/or disappear. Palpatine appoints governors to oversee all star systems in the Republic; these governors, later known as Imperial Moffs, report directly to Palpatine and are appointed without a vote or approval from any senators. This effectively sidelines the Senate, leaving it unable to influence how the galaxy is governed.

The Old Republic symbolism is discarded in favor of the Imperial crest, an emblem that comes from the Galactic Roundel symbol of the ancient Bendu monks (predecessors of the Jedi). Originally a symbol of unity and non-confrontation, the wheel is perverted by Palpatine by removing two spokes, echoing Hitler's appropriation of the swastika from Hinduism and Buddhism.

=== Government ===
==== Legislature ====
The Senate, known as the Imperial Senate, nominally continues to exist following Palpatine's establishment of the Empire, though it is virtually powerless. Palpatine dissolves the Senate (off-camera) in A New Hope after discovering that several members helped found the Rebel Alliance, a guerrilla army dedicated to overthrowing the Empire and restoring the Republic.

==== Executive ====
With the end of the Clone Wars, the purge of the Jedi Order, and the formation of the First Galactic Empire, Palpatine rules with absolute power as Emperor. Between the events of Revenge of the Sith and A New Hope, Palpatine rules the galaxy from the confines of his heavily guarded Imperial Palace on Coruscant. Coruscant was introduced in Timothy Zahn's then-canon novel Heir to the Empire. It made its film debut in the special edition of Return of the Jedi. Inspiration for the world-spanning city came from 1940s science fiction works, especially Isaac Asimov's Trantor. Visually, it resembles the Art Deco skyscrapers of Manhattan.

Star Wars Battlefront II (2017) depicts Palpatine as intentionally having no clear line of succession, desiring either immortality or the destruction of the Empire.

===== Imperial Ruling Council =====
Unwilling to embroil himself in the day-to-day running of the Galactic Empire, the Emperor leaves the mundane work to the Imperial Ruling Council (IRC), an advisory body with whom he confers on vital affairs of state. The group is made up of Imperial Advisors, "yes-men" who serve as ministers and counselors. The spokesman of the Imperial Ruling Council is the Grand Vizier Mas Amedda, who attends most of the Imperial Senate's sessions. Amedda functions as an intermediary for Palpatine, managing his schedule, screening his calls and contacting other Imperial dignitaries and officers on his behalf. The Imperial Ruling Council also keeps tabs on the progress of the Imperial Military and delivers news from Imperial High Command to the Emperor.

==== Imperial High Command ====
The Emperor leaves the actual martial management to Imperial High Command (IHC), a central command structure that notably coordinates the Galactic Empire's war effort. The cabinet enjoys much power within the government's hierarchy, being responsible for sanctioning weapons programs (such as the TIE Defender project), supervising the armed forces, forming strategies and organizing expansionary or pacification campaigns. Despite this, the IHC was unable to take any serious action against rebel sympathizers with allies in the Imperial Senate. The group works closely with the Council of Moffs and notifies the IHC on important developments. The Imperial High Command's overseer is Darth Vader, who relentlessly pursues the fledgling Rebel Alliance, in addition to quelling insurgencies and purging the last of the Jedi Order. As Emperor Palpatine's second-in-command, Vader is treated with almost the same deference as his master and has his personal battalion and armada—the 501st Legion and "Death Squadron", respectively—at his beck and call.

Imperial High Command maintained a number of subdivisions, each charged with directing the naval, ground and intelligence assets of the Imperial Military. The most important of these were the Joint Chiefs, an executive group of senior officers who advised both the Emperor and the Commander-in-Chief on all military-related matters. Other members included the Grand Admirals, a cadre of the 12 highest-ranking naval officers who helmed large Imperial fleets and policed Imperial Space; Grand Admiral Thrawn, the commander of the 7th Fleet, is the most famous of their number.

==== Council of Moffs ====
Aside from the Imperial Ruling Council and Imperial High Command, power resides in the hands of "Praetorian administrators" (planetary governors) that form the Council of Moffs. The cabinet is composed of 20 Moffs (sector governors) and their superiors, the "Grand Moffs" (oversector governors), all of whom answer directly to the Emperor. The Moffs are senior officials who held the governorship over Administrators of minor provinces and commanded a Sector Fleet-size imperial armed forces at the sector level. (Note: A standard Sector Group was composed of 2,400 military assets, of which 24 were Imperial-class star destroyers; an additional 1,600 were escort and auxiliary warships) The Grand Moffs are among the Galactic Empire's top figures, being on equal-footing with the Grand Vizier and the Commander-in-Chief and having been similarly appointed by the Emperor himself. The Council of Moffs works closely with Imperial High Command and is therefore able to dispose of the Imperial Military's assets to enforce the Emperor's authority in its "provinces". Governor Wilhuff Tarkin is the most prominent Grand Moff, having suggested the creation of the role and thus holds the distinction of being the first.

==== Judiciary ====
In the series Andor, the Galactic Empire is depicted as forgoing right to counsel, right to a fair trial and other fundamental rights. It is authoritarian, arbitrary and cruel in its presumption of guilt rule over ordinary people, particularly when it comes to certain agencies such as the Imperial Security Bureau (ISB), which acts as a secret police force. In the latter part of the series, the Imperial Supreme Tribunal autocracy takes to retroactively extending the sentences of prisoners, moving prisoners around to different facilities after they are due to be released, euthanizing labor camp prisoners when they become too ill to work, not permitting defendants in criminal cases to present a defense, and committing mass murder when its officers feel they are losing control of a situation. It also engages in torture of subjects of interest, uses agent provocateurs to instigate rebellion as justification for genocide, and carries out arbitrary extrajudicial executions for political purposes. ISB agents are assigned to spy on political dissidents in the Imperial Senate, such as Senator Mon Mothma.

==== Imperial Supreme Tribunal ====
While a body with "Supreme Court" in the name existed, the Imperial Supreme Tribunal served as a rubber stamp for Imperial authority rather than an independent judiciary, its function drastically altered from its Republic predecessor. The entire Imperial Court system was designed to prioritize control and the extraction of labor over traditional justice. Cases, especially politically sensitive ones, often had extrajudicial punishment and predetermined outcomes in favor of the Empire. The Imperial Supreme Court was effectively overseen by the Committee of the Commission for the Preservation of the New Order (COMPNOR), an organization dedicated to enforcing the Emperor's will and human-centric policies. The Imperial criminal justice system, the Imperial Department of Justice, was headed by the Procurator of Justice and was responsible for prosecuting political prisoners and administering sentences.

==== Imperial Security Bureau ====
The Imperial Security Bureau (ISB) is the politically aligned and indoctrinated civilian intelligence branch of the Galactic Empire that is charged with matters of internal state security and law enforcement, being analogous to the Gestapo, the Schutzstaffel, the CIA, Mossad and the KGB. The ISB was not a national agency, but a part of COMPNOR; Palpatine's own political party. The ISB's direct connection and fanatical loyalty to Palpatine mean there are no checks and balances on their power.

Consisting of several supervisors overseeing multiple sectors, they are charged with matters of dissidents, counter-terrorism, criminal investigation, internal affairs, state security, state-sponsored propaganda and ensuring the political loyalty of citizens to the Galactic Empire. Each supervisor had at least one ISB attendant assigned to them. Veteran Colonel Wullf Yularen acts as ISB's main figurehead and spokesman, answering to the likes of Emperor Palpatine, Darth Vader and Amedda.

Towards the end of the Galactic Empire's reign after the death of Emperor Palpatine, ISB officers were entrusted with carrying out Operation Cinder. (Note: As seen in Star Wars Battlefront II (2017 video game), and introduced in the 2015 Marvel Comics miniseries Shattered Empire.) When that operation fails and the empire collapses, some former ISB officers, such as Moff Gideon, become warlords and part of the Imperial remnants.

==== Inquisitorius ====
Outside the formal chain of command, the Galactic Empire's reins are de facto held by the Sith, a cult of Force-wielders – called Sith Lords – that call on the dark side in their plot to dominate the galaxy and destroy the Jedi. Both Emperor Palpatine and Darth Vader are part of this cult, although this is known to or guessed by only a very few figures in the regime's upper echelons, such as Governor Tarkin. The Imperial Inquisition, or Inquisitorius, acts as an extension of the Sith Order, but are not "true Sith". Its Force-attuned operatives, the Inquisitors, are routinely given control of Imperial Military assets to hunt down the Jedi that survived the initial purge. They are above the law and have complete discretion as to the methods used to accomplish their mission. They exploit Jedi compassion by whatever means necessary, often holding entire population centers hostage. They also hunt and abduct Force-sensitive children to be brainwashed into the Emperor's service. Inquisitorius work either alone or in small groups according to the nature of a particular task. The Inquisitors' lack of proper rank within the armed forces, as well as their reliance on "occult" ways, earnt the ire of the standard officers. Members often received access to prototype equipment before its introduction to the larger Imperial Military, such as the TIE Advanced v1 and an early prototype of the TIE interceptor. The Inquisitorius was founded by the Emperor and is governed by the Commander-in-Chief, but the agency is actually led by a Grand Inquisitor who defers to both.

At some point before A New Hope, the group essentially became defunct, with almost all members either defecting, getting killed by other Force users or suffering punishment by Vader himself. Some former members survived well after the dissolution of the organization: one known member, Marrok, who was known as the First Brother during his service in the Inquisitorius, was active during the New Republic era as a mercenary before being killed by Ahsoka Tano.

=== Military ===
==== Notable officers ====
- Darth Vader – Dark Lord of the Sith, thus Palpatine's second-in-command, until his death in the Battle of Endor.
- Mas Amedda – Grand Vizier of the Imperial Ruling Council and vice-chair of the Imperial Senate, later installed by Gallius Rax as puppet leader following Palpatine's death in Aftermath: Life Debt. Amedda formally surrenders the Galactic Empire to the New Republic in Aftermath: Empire's End.
- Wilhuff Tarkin – Grand Moff of the Oversector Outer and commander of the Death Star, until his death in the Battle of Yavin.
- Thrawn – Grand Admiral of the 7th Fleet of the Imperial Navy, until being MIA upon his defeat in the liberation of Lothal. Thrawn was stranded on the extragalactic planet of Peridea, where he remained until 9 ABY and escaped with the help of Morgan Elsbeth.
- Orson Krennic – Head of Imperial Weapons Division and director of the Death Star, until his death in the Battle of Scarif. Krennic was also the Director of Advanced Weapons research.

==== Tarkin doctrine ====
The Tarkin doctrine, named after Grand Moff Tarkin, is a military doctrine of using fear through overt displays of overwhelming power to keep control over the galaxy. The plan presented by Tarkin himself to Palpatine in 18 BBY outlined the Empire's goal and structure: bringing order to the galaxy and restoring rule of law to sectors overtaken by piracy and organized crime, ending destructive conflicts through grand strategy, a plan for maximizing social control and propaganda, maintaining economic order and increasing security in the Galactic Empire. Tarkin believed the chief factor that contributed most to the demise of the Republic was not, in fact, the war, but rampant self-interest, which left the body politic feckless and corrupt.

Consider the self-interest of the Core Worlds, unwavering in their exploitation of the Outer Systems for their resources; the Outer Systems themselves, undermined, by their permissive disregard of smuggling and slavery; those ambitious members of the Senate who sought only status and opportunity. By partitioning the galaxy into regions, we, The Empire, actually achieve a unity previously absent; where once our loyalties and allegiances were divided, they now serve one being, with one goal: a cohesive galaxy in which everyone prospers. For the first time in one thousand generations our sector governors will not be working solely to enrich Coruscant and the Core Worlds, but to advance the quality of life in the star systems that make up each sector — keeping the spaceways safe, maintaining open and accessible communications, assuring that tax revenues are properly levied and allocated to improving the infrastructure.

— Grand Moff Tarkin, in Star Wars: Tarkin

The plan—which Palpatine ultimately had implemented in its entirety—contained three main principles: territorial consolidation, rapid communication, and coercive diplomacy. Tarkin's concept was that rule could be established and maintained "through fear of force rather than force itself", and he believed grand displays of power—when combined with oppressive means of terrorizing communities—could suppress dissent and crush any would-be rebellion. This Doctrine became the Empire's core military doctrine in relation to peacekeeping, internal security, counter-insurgency, and state terrorism. The instrument of this power is the military, which includes Imperial Stormtroopers, a massive fleet of 25,000 Star Destroyers, at least 10 Executor-Class Super Star Destroyers, and the Death Star, a moon-sized superweapon capable of destroying entire planets.

Plans for the Death Star first appear (in-universe chronology) in Attack of the Clones, and construction begins at the end of Revenge of the Sith. The Tarkin Doctrine can be summarized as follows:

- Establish "Oversectors" which contain tumultuous systems; to monitor and react to rebellious activities within those systems. Oversectors would be formed without regard for the borders of standard sectors and would receive more forces than other regions of the Empire. This Imperial presence would be designed to stop small rebel factions before they could become a larger established threat. An average of three Sector Groups would be deployed in an Oversector.
- Assign command of each Oversector to a single individual who reports directly to the Emperor, in order to eliminate any delays created by political opportunism by Imperial advisors.
- Improve communication resources and Imperial response time by placing modified HoloNet transceivers (cannibalized from existing HoloNet transceivers) aboard each flagship of every Sector Group within an Oversector command. Place similar facilities aboard the Emperor's flagship and in Imperial City on Imperial Centre (formally Coruscant).
- Control unruly portions of the galaxy through a fear of force rather than force itself. Through the combination of superior coordination of multiple Oversector groups and the control of information (news media) an impression of overwhelming force will be installed within the citizenry, thereby instilling the idea that resistance is futile.
- Continue to research and develop new and more powerful starships and weapons designed to inspire fear in the resistant systems. Present the citizen with a weapon so powerful, so immense as to defy all conceivable attack against it, a weapon invulnerable and invincible in battle, that shall become a symbol for the Empire. This weapon must possess a power great enough to dispatch an entire system. Only a handful or one of these weapons would be required to accomplish this task.

==== Imperial Navy ====
The Imperial Naval Command (INC), also referred to as the Imperial Starfleet, is the foremost military arm of the Galactic Empire in charge of maintaining security, peace and order in the galaxy. Led by Darth Vader, it absorbed the military forces of the Galactic Republic after Emperor Palpatine's declaration of the New Order.

At its peak, the Imperial Navy fields millions of warships, including an estimated 25,000 Star Destroyers, fulfilling the Emperor's will throughout the galaxy. The Empire's central warship cadre is well structured and uniformed, but the Imperial Navy suffers against strike craft, largely due to the inadequacies of its own starfighters and point defense. The Empire's focus on size, firepower, and terror comes at the expense of a well-balanced fleet. After its defeat at the Battle of Endor, the Galactic Empire splits up into warring factions, and the Imperial Starfleet along with it. While many of the remnants of the Imperial Navy are later reunited under impressive Imperial commanders, the military organization ceases to exist shortly after the death of the Emperor.

Specific responsibilities of the Imperial Navy include defending Imperial citizens from space-based threats (such as pirates, smugglers and rebel contingents), enforcing Imperial will, and overseeing commerce through customs and blockade operations. The Imperial Navy also performs orbital bombardments and transports major ground force deployments, supporting them with space, orbital, and aerial support. Imperial Navy officers wear the same gray standard uniform that their Army counterparts use, and both services use colored chest plaques to denote rank.

===== Imperial Starfighter Corps =====
The Imperial Starfighter Corps (ISC) was the starfighter pilot branch of the Galactic Empire. Although the Corps was a component of the Navy, most pilots were assigned to ground operations with the Imperial Army. Imperial starfighters include cheap and lightly-defended mass-produced models like the TIE (Twin Ion Engine) fighter, TIE interceptor, TIE bomber, and TIE Brute, which do not include hyperdrives or deflector shields. Other high-end TIE models also saw service, many of which are experimental and break away from the Empire's "quantity over quality" mentality regarding starfighters and capital ship-based space combat doctrine by adding features such as deflector shields and hyperdrives, among them the TIE Advanced v1, TIE Advanced x1, TIE Reaper, TIE Avenger, TIE Defender and its Elite variant, and TIE Striker. The Corps were scattered after the Battle of Endor (4 ABY).

==== Imperial Army ====
The Imperial Army was the ground-based force. Imperial Army enlisted soldiers wore gray uniforms with a mandarin collar and four pockets, along with chest pieces similar to Stormtroopers but in black. Corporals displayed their rank on one of their shoulder pauldrons with a single white diagonal stripe. They also wore a gray Imperial kepi or Imperial Combat Helmet.

===== Imperial Stormtrooper Corps =====
The Imperial Stormtrooper Corps (ISC) were an elite corps of rapid response all-environment shock troops—organized like the U.S. Marine Corps with their own separate divisions. The Stormtroopers operate in conjunction with the Army (Ground) Troopers and Navy (Marine) Troopers—who were used as garrison forces—to reinforce and hold defensive positions until the regular military arrived. When not in their signature white armor, stormtrooper officers wear black uniforms.

=== Galactic Civil War ===
After the formation of the Empire and the purge of the Jedi, Palpatine declares martial law throughout the galaxy. Those in hiding or attempting to either flee from or oppose the New Imperial Order are subject to persecution or death.

As portrayed in the live-action series Andor, one single moment in Galactic history completely changed the Empire's policy towards its citizens and therefore changed its relationship with them. In 5 BBY, on the relatively unremarkable planet of Aldhani, a small rebel team managed to infiltrate the local Imperial depository, stealing a decent portion of the sector payroll. This created a massive Imperial overreaction, increasing their security spending and draconian law enforcement policies, making all future rebellious activity even more costly and difficult, which is exactly what the mastermind of the heist Luthen Rael wanted.

As early as 19 BBY, what started as isolated resistance against the Empire, however with the Battle of Scarif in 1 BBY, tensions had evolved into another galactic conventional war for the first time in nearly two decades. This is the start of the bloody Galactic Civil War fought between the Empire and the Rebel Alliance.

==== The Two Death Stars ====
As portrayed in the animated series Star Wars Rebels and The Bad Batch, the Empire explores ways to weaponize Force-sensitive kyber crystals, which are sacred to the Jedi and are at the core of every lightsaber. They mine for kyber crystals across worlds, but are thwarted twice in securing massive crystal reserves by the Ghost crew and Saw Gerrera. On Jedha, however, the Empire uncovers a surplus of kyber, with which they power the Death Star.

The Death Star, a moon-sized battle station with sufficient firepower to destroy an entire planet, is designed to be the ultimate weapon of the Empire's power. The threat of this weapon provoked a desperate suicidal raid, the Battle of Scarif, by the Rebel Alliance. The engagement and loss of the classified Death Star blueprint plans were seen as a complete embarrassment for the Imperial forces, in addition to the loss of two Star Destroyers and the destruction of the Scarif base.

Tarkin, the station's commander, demonstrates that power in A New Hope when he destroys Alderaan as a show of force. In the film's climactic scene, however, the station is attacked by rebel starfighters who have come into possession of the station's blueprints. The battle ends with the Death Star's destruction at the hands of Luke Skywalker, which is the Rebel Alliance's first major military success against the Empire. Politically, Alderaan's destruction was a watershed moment for most Imperial loyalists, many of whom would later defect to the Alliance; it revealed the Empire's willingness to kill loyalists on Alderaan, along with millions of innocents, just to prove a point to a rebellious Senator. Tarkin's Doctrine, meant to perpetually "tighten the noose" and instill fear of annihilation for engaging in rebellion, is eventually undermined by the collective societal realization that no one was truly safe.

After the Battle of Yavin, Vader's special powers as Commander-in-Chief are increased by Palpatine, granting him full command over all other officials and officers to ease his campaign against the Rebellion. In The Empire Strikes Back, Vader becomes obsessed with finding the Force-sensitive Luke and leads his stormtroopers to attack on the rebel base on Hoth, but the rebels escape. Vader would continue to systematically and ruthlessly dismantle Alliance assets, and to hunt for Luke in the process, forcing Alliance survivors to abandon all static bases and regroup with Alliance HQ and remain nomadic.

In Return of the Jedi, after four years of conflict and near constant harassment by Vader's forces, the Alliance achieves a decisive victory over the Empire during the Battle of Endor. In the film's climactic battle, the Rebellion destroys the second Death Star and a number of capital ships that contain a great portion of the Imperial Navy's highest-ranking officers. During this battle, Vader redeems himself by sacrificing his life to kill Palpatine in order to save his son, Luke Skywalker.

==== State Collapse ====
The dual loss of the Emperor and his right-hand, the Commander-in-Chief, creates a power vacuum of chaos and instability. Most of the intelligent, competent, and experienced military officers and political leadership (including Moff Jerrod and four Grand Admirals) who might have succeeded them were killed at the Battle of Endor. By design, Palpatine desired the Empire to have no clear line of succession, for he had intended to rule ad infinitum; and there was no next-in-line after Palpatine and Vader. Revolts, infighting, fiefdoms and warlordism gradually fracture the Empire apart more effectively than any damage capable of being inflicted by the Rebel Alliance, as the Moffs and Grand Moffs maneuver to grab power for themselves amidst civil unrest.

Palpatine left posthumous orders. Upon verification of his death, messenger droids are sent to select Imperial officers to relay his last orders: to begin Operation: Cinder, a scorched earth policy tasking hardline Imperials to destroy entire planets so the Rebellion cannot claim them. The fallen Emperor does not desire the Empire to continue without his presence; if he cannot live forever as the galaxy's Emperor, he would rather see it destroyed.

A year after the Battle of Endor, the bolstered Rebellion defeats the weakened Empire during the Battle of Jakku and formally establishes the New Republic.

=== New Republic Era ===
By the time of The Mandalorian, set five years after the Battle of Endor, the Galactic Empire no longer exists as an official government or a major power and is essentially a failed state. Its former leaders – who are now warlords that represent several different rump states, are in conflict with one another and are in a state of cold peace with the New Republic. This was over the power vacuum left behind, that followed the reinstating of the Galactic Republic. One Imperial remnant established a base on the planet Nevarro, where Mandalorian bounty hunter Din Djarin was hired to acquire an asset, later revealed to be a Force-sensitive infant named Grogu. Djarin abandoned his job and decided to protect the child, making him an enemy of the Imperial warlord Moff Gideon and his army of mercenary stormtroopers.

Djarin later returned to Nevarro, reuniting with his allies Greef Karga and Cara Dune, as well as an unnamed Mythrol, to take down an Imperial facility to eradicate the Empire's presence on the planet. The group soon discovered that it was housing Imperial experiments, using blood rich in midichlorians obtained from Grogu. The group succeeded in taking down the base. Gideon was informed of the developments while overseeing a unit of enhanced droids known as darktroopers, who would later help him capture Grogu. Djarin led a mission to rescue Grogu, assisted by several allies including Dune, Boba Fett, Fennec Shand, and Mandalorian warrior Bo-Katan Kryze. The group boarded Gideon's command ship and subdued him. Djarin turned Grogu over to Luke Skywalker, who took down the Moff's darktroopers.

=== Successor ===
The most successful remnants of the Empire reformed as the First Order, led by Supreme Leader Snoke and former Imperial officers. They become a major faction in the galaxy, after years of another cold war in the galaxy. They are the main antagonist faction of the sequel trilogy and are introduced in The Force Awakens, they face a reformed Rebel Alliance's succussor called the Resistance. The First Order rises to power through the use of Starkiller Base, a planet-converted superweapon, that destroys the Hosnian system, the location of the New Republic's capital, allowing the Empire to reclaim authority over the galaxy. Starkiller Base is destroyed by the Resistance in The Force Awakens. This event starts yet another galactic conventional war, known as the First Order-Resistance War. In the sequel The Last Jedi, however, First Order forces draw the Resistance out of hiding and wipe out a majority of their fleet. During the battle, Snoke is killed by his apprentice Kylo Ren, who assumes the title of Supreme Leader.

In The Rise of Skywalker, the final film in the sequel trilogy, the First Order allies itself with the Sith Eternal, a cult led by Palpatine, who had transferred his essence into a cloned body and formerly positioned himself to control the First Order over Snoke, a puppet ruler. With the First Order's allegiance to the Sith, they rename themselves as the Final Order. The cult is stationed on the isolated Sith planet of Exegol. Palpatine offers Ren, who had tracked him to the planet, control of the Sith Eternal's fleet, the Final Order, in exchange for killing the young Jedi Rey, Palpatine's own granddaughter. Ren initially accepts the assignment but later forsakes the dark side after a duel with Rey in the wreckage of the second Death Star. With Ren's defection, Palpatine turns command over to Allegiant General Enric Pryde, previously an Imperial officer.

With help from the spirit of Luke Skywalker, Rey eventually makes her way to Exegol, guiding the Resistance away to the planet to take down the Sith Eternal forces, including the Sith fleet. With help from a redeemed Ren and the spirits of Jedi past, she resists Palpatine's promises of power and turns his own Force lightning against him, destroying the Sith Lord once and for all. The Resistance, with help from their allies across the galaxy, destroy the remaining Sith forces and prevents the establishment of a new Sith Empire. Without the reinforcements of the Sith, people across the galaxy overthrow the Final Order for good.

=== Legends ===
With the 2012 acquisition of Lucasfilm by The Walt Disney Company, most of the licensed Star Wars Expanded Universe material was rebranded as Star Wars Legends and declared non-canon to the franchise on April 25, 2014.

==== Thrawn trilogy ====
In Timothy Zahn's "Thrawn trilogy" of novels – Heir to the Empire (1991), Dark Force Rising (1992), and The Last Command (1993) – an army of former Imperials, led by Grand Admiral Thrawn, attempts to overthrow the New Republic and install a dictatorship known as the Empire of the Hand. The backstory of the series explains that following their defeat at the Battle of Endor, the galactic sectors that are still under Imperial control were now governed by several different military juntas that fight each other in a conflict known as the Imperial Civil War. All the while resuming the Galactic Civil War with the Rebellion's successor, the New Republic, in a two-front war, for control of the galaxy for years, until mostly uniting under Grand Admiral Thrawn. By the time of The Last Command, Thrawn has nearly defeated the New Republic, but they claim victory in a last-ditch effort, and Thrawn is killed by his own bodyguard, shattering the Empire's unity.

==== Agent of the Empire ====
Agent of the Empire is a 10-issue comic book series published by Dark Horse Comics from 2011 to 2013. It was written by John Ostrander and illustrated by Stephane Roux, and is set three years before the original Star Wars film. Two five-issue story arcs follow an Imperial secret agent, and feature characters such as Han Solo, Princess Leia and Boba Fett. Both arcs were collected in trade paperback volumes.

==== Jedi Prince ====
In the Jedi Prince novel series, a group of impostors calling themselves the Prophets of the Dark Side install a three-eyed mutant named Trioculus as Emperor by claiming that he is Palpatine's son, reforming the Empire (as Trioculus's Empire). By the end of the series, Palpatine's true son, Triclops, helps the New Republic defeat this new enemy.

==== Dark Empire ====
In the Dark Empire comic book series, Palpatine is reborn in a clone body and unites most of the scattered remnants of the Empire (forming the Dark Empire), hoping to retake control of the galaxy. By the sequel, Empire's End, he is defeated and destroyed once and for all. Following the final death of Palpatine, Luke Skywalker, influenced by the Force ghost of Obi-Wan Kenobi, starts the New Jedi Order in an ancient temple on Yavin 4, which had undone the Emperor's purge of the Old Jedi Order 28 years earlier at the rise of the Galactic Empire.

==== Jedi Academy trilogy ====
In the Jedi Academy trilogy, an Imperial admiral named Daala commandeers the remainder of the Imperial Navy (the Crimson Empire) and mounts a ferocious assault on the New Republic. She nearly succeeds in taking over the galaxy, but is foiled by New Republic pilots Wedge Antilles and Lando Calrissian in the final entry, Champions of the Force. A year later, she would arrange the assassination of the rival Imperial warlords to unify the feuding Imperial factions into the Imperial Remnant and bring an end to the Imperial Civil War.

==== Darksaber ====
In the 1995 novel Darksaber, Daala, frustrated with the Imperial warlords in the Core fighting and bickering amongst themselves, orchestrates the warlords' deaths and unites and becomes the leader of the remaining Imperial forces. After being defeated in battle once again by the New Republic, she resigns and selects Gilad Pellaeon (originally in the Thrawn trilogy) as the new leader, where he becomes Grand Admiral Pellaeon. At the end of the novel, he signs a peace treaty with the New Republic representative Ponc Gavrisom and finally ends the Galactic Civil War.

==== New Jedi Order ====
By the time of the New Jedi Order series, the remaining Imperial military factions sign a truce with the New Republic, becoming the Imperial Remnant. The former enemies then become allies against the invading Yuuzhan Vong. A few years later, the Remnant helped the Galactic Alliance fight an assimilating insect species known as the Killiks. A few years after that, the Imperial Remnant became a third party in the Second Galactic Civil War and its post-war insurgency. Eventually, they make peace with the Alliance and Confederation. All three of these are represented by former Imperial commanders.

==== Legacy ====
The Star Wars: Legacy comic book series, set 127 years after the original Star Wars film, explains that, during a civil war, the New Galactic Empire known as the Fel Empire declares war on the Galactic Federation of Free Alliances (Galactic Alliance), the successor state of the New Republic, after 83 years of a cold war that began in 44 ABY. This conflict begins the Sith-Imperial War, which, after three years, leads to the eventual defeat of the Galactic Alliance and the Galactic Empire asserting its domination over the galaxy once again in 130 ABY. A few months later, the Sith overthrows the Fel Empire. The Sith Lord Darth Krayt, the leader of the One Sith, usurps the throne and forces Emperor Roan Fel to take refuge in the fortress planet of Bastion.

In 138 ABY, the Galactic Alliance Remnant, led by Admiral Gar Stazi; Fel's forces, known as the Empire-in-exile, led by Empress Marasiah Fel; and the New Jedi Order, led by Jedi Master K'Krukk, unite against Krayt's empire and eventually destroy it in the Battle of Coruscant, ending 157 years of its existence. The three united factions form a new galactic government called the Galactic Federation Triumvirate (GFT).

The One Sith, led by Darth Wredd, remains at large and wages a war against the GFT. One year later, the former Empire-in-exile works with the other two factions, killing Wredd, rounding up all surviving members, including their new leader, Darth Nihl, and permanently dissolving the One Sith and the Sith religion itself for good. The next year, the GFT defeats the secular alliances of the One Sith, and in the aftermath of that conflict, the galaxy enters an era of peace and unity for the first time since before the Clone Wars.

== See also ==
- Isaac Asimov's Galactic Empire
- Imperium of Mankind
- List of Star Wars characters
- Utopian and dystopian fiction
- State terrorism
