= Deathstar =

#redirect Death Star

- From a fictional element: This is a redirect from a fictional element (such as an object or concept) to a related fictional work or list of similar elements. The destination may be an article about a related fictional work that mentions this element, a subsection, or a standalone list of elements.
  - For redirects named for fictional characters use {{R from fictional character}}, and for redirects named for fictional places use {{R from fictional location}}.
