= Alderaan =

Fictional planet in Star Wars

- Star Wars location
- Alderaan as it appears in Star Wars: Episode IV – A New Hope
- First appearance: Star Wars: From the Adventures of Luke Skywalker (1976 novelization); Star Wars (1977 theatrical film)
- Last appearance: Obi-Wan Kenobi (2022)
- Created by: George Lucas
- Genre: Science fiction

In-universe information
- Type: Terrestrial planet
- Race: Human (Alderaanians)
- Characters: Raymus Antilles; Cara Dune; Bail Organa; Breha Organa; Leia Organa
- Moons: 1
- Terrain: Grassland; Plain; Forest; Mountain
- Affiliations: Galactic Republic; Galactic Empire; Rebel Alliance
- Oceans: 0
- Standard Galactic Grid Coordinates: M-12

Alderaan (/ˈɔːldərɑːn, -ræn/ AWL-də-ra(h)n) is an Earth-like fictional planet featured in the Star Wars franchise. It is depicted as a blue-green terrestrial planet with humanoid inhabitants, and characterized by a peaceful culture. It is the home planet of Princess Leia Organa, one of the lead characters in the film series, as well as former Rebel shock trooper Cara Dune. In the original 1977 film, (Note: Later titled Star Wars: Episode IV – A New Hope) Alderaan is destroyed by the Death Star's superlaser on orders from Grand Moff Tarkin.

== Depiction ==
Early drafts of the Star Wars story include references to at least two planets which later evolved into the concept of Alderaan. Star Wars author George Lucas included a planet called Alderaan in early treatments; in The Star Wars (1973), Alderaan is a city-planet and the capital planet of the galaxy (prefiguring the planet Coruscant which later featured in the films). The draft script opens with a scene in which an "eerie blue-green" planet called Aquilae is threatened by an armed space fortress.

In Lucas' 1975 draft, Adventures of the Starkiller as taken from the Journal of the Whills, Saga I: The Star Wars, the capital planet of Alderaan is described as a floating city in the clouds, "suspended in a sea of cirrus methane". A planet described in Lucas' draft script as being "under siege by the Imperial Legions of Alderaan" and which is later destroyed is named as Ogana Major. Early sketches commissioned by Lucas from conceptual illustrator Ralph McQuarrie show a design which very closely resembles Cloud City, as featured in the later sequel, The Empire Strikes Back. In Lucas' third draft, the Imperial City of Alderaan has become the home world of the Sith Lords, and Darth Vader holds Princess Leia captive here. Lucas continued to hone his script, aided by screenwriters Willard Huyck and Gloria Katz; names of planets and characters were revised and the narrative was improved, and by the fourth draft, scenes on the Imperial capital planet had been moved to a space station called the Death Star and the peaceful world destroyed by the Empire had taken the name Alderaan.

The on-screen depictions of Alderaan in the Star Wars films are scant; the distant planet is seen momentarily in Star Wars (1977) prior to its destruction, and in Revenge of the Sith (2005) a short scene shows a city amid a snow-covered, mountainous landscape.

=== Film ===
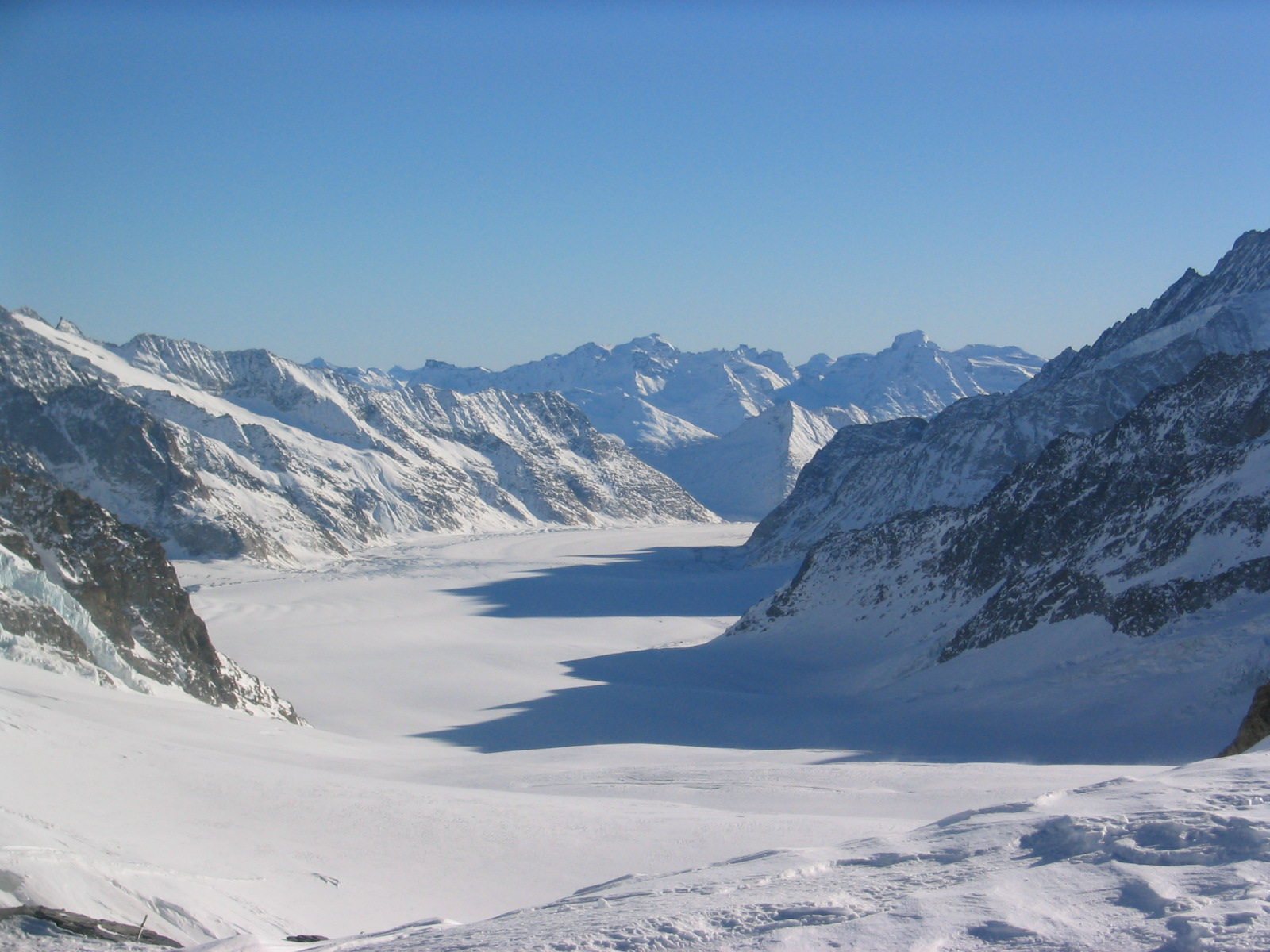
Mountain scenery in Grindelwald, Switzerland, used to depict Alderaan

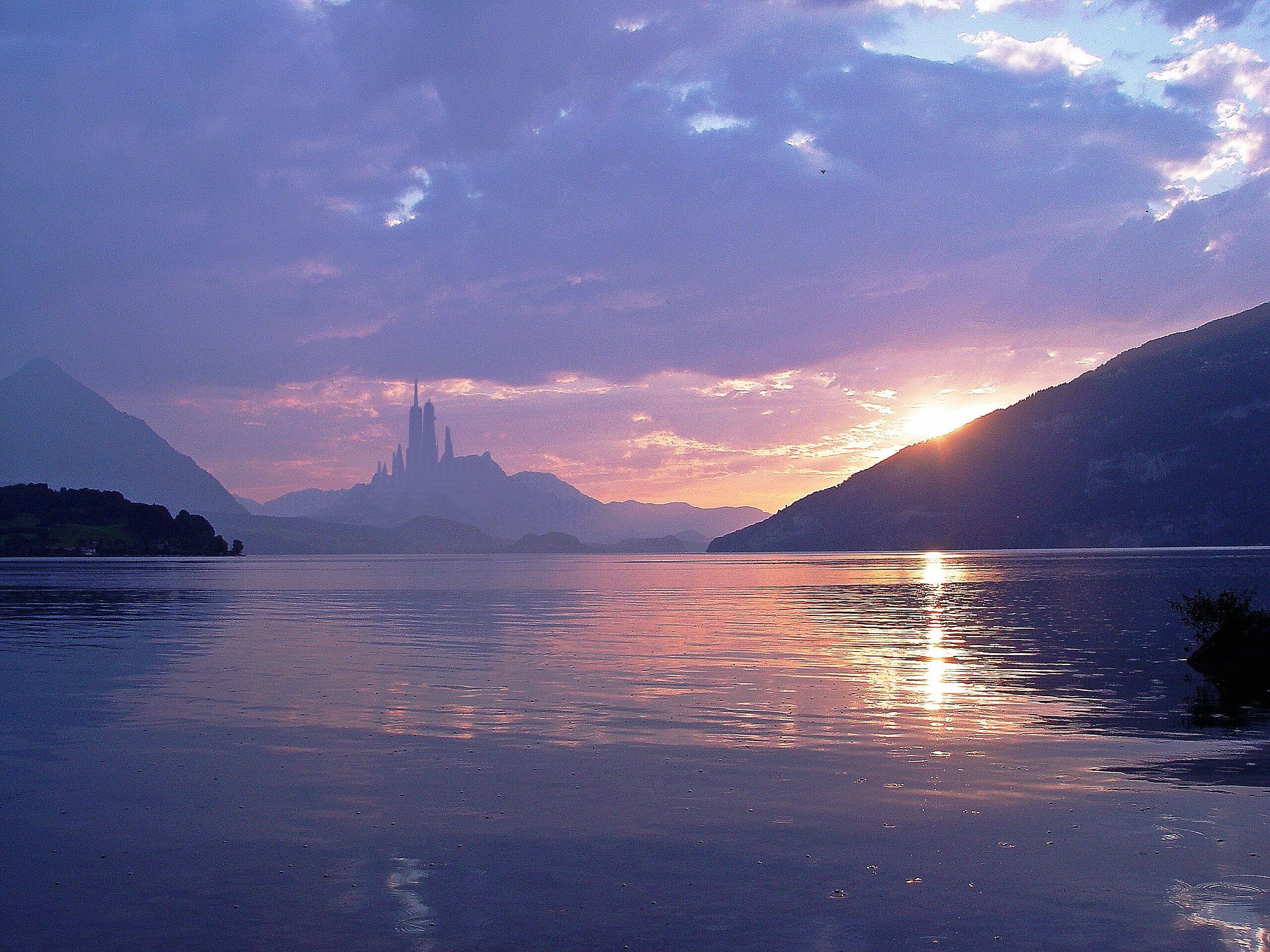
Composite image based on a shot of Lake Thun, depicting Alderaan

Characters from Alderaan

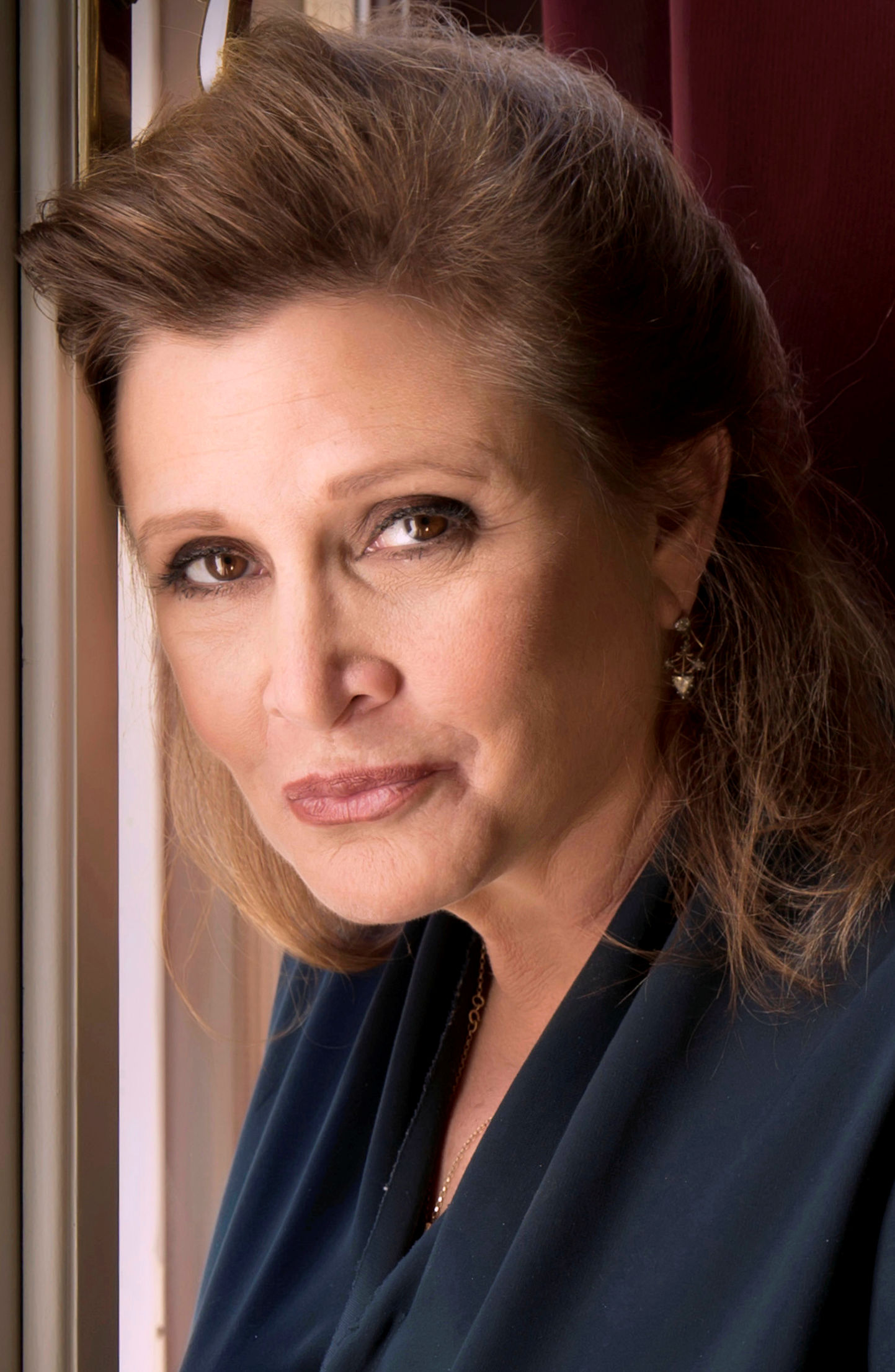
Carrie Fisher, who played Alderaan's best-known inhabitant, Princess Leia Organa

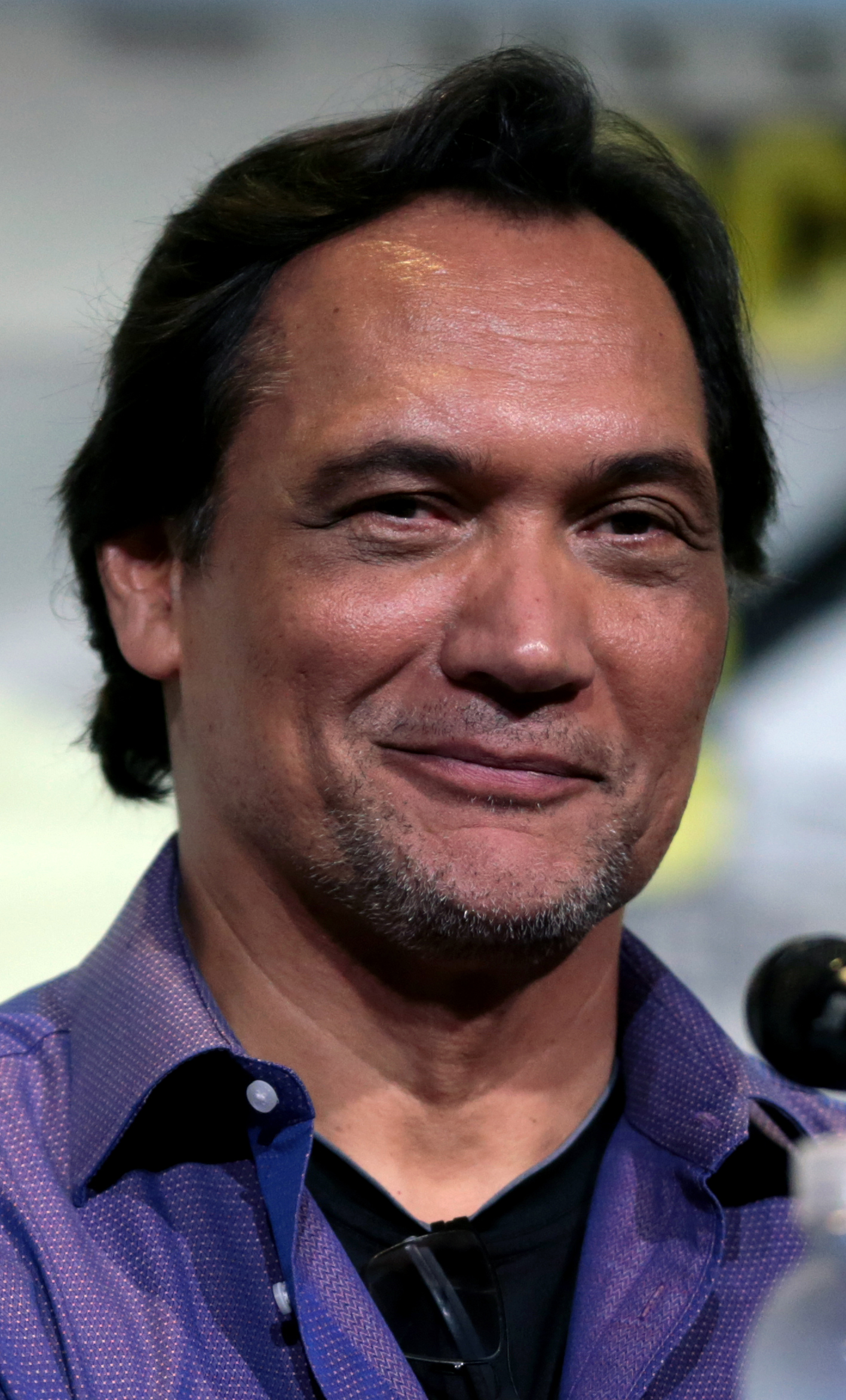
Jimmy Smits, who played Alderaan royal and adoptive father of Leia, Bail Organa

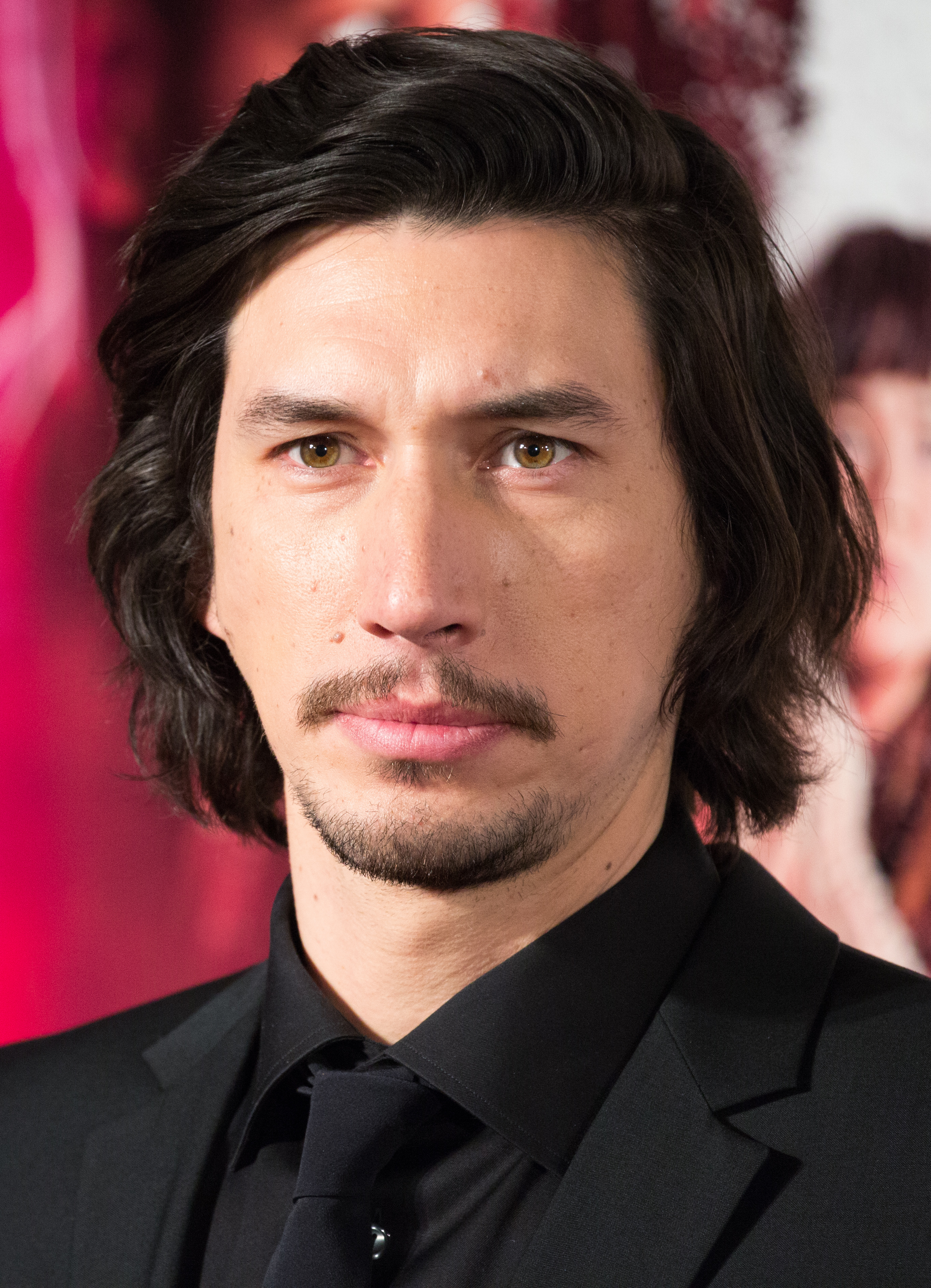
Adam Driver, who played Ben Solo, the son of Han Solo and Princess Leia, and a "Prince of Alderaan", in the Star Wars sequel trilogy

Alderaan was originally featured in the first film, Star Wars, released in 1977. The opening scene depicts the capture of a small spaceship from Alderaan, the Tantive IV, by the Galactic Empire, and introduces the character of Princess Leia Organa, a princess of the Royal House of Alderaan who is played by Carrie Fisher.

Alderaan appears in a later scene in the film, but is only shown on-screen in a distant view from space as the Empire's gigantic space station, the Death Star, moves into orbit around the planet. The battle station's commander, the Grand Moff Tarkin (Peter Cushing) orders the Death Star's superweapon to be fired at the planet as both a test of the superlaser at full power and as a message to the rest of the galaxy that the price of any type of resistance was extermination. Alderaan explodes instantly in a ball of fire. It is later shown that the shattered planet has been reduced to a cloud of asteroids as the Millennium Falcon spaceship attempts to visit the planet.

The destruction of Alderaan meant that it was not depicted in subsequent Star Wars films until the series of prequel films was produced. The planet made its first on-screen appearance since 1977 in Episode III: Revenge of the Sith (2005), appearing briefly at the end of the film. The adoptive father of Princess Leia, Bail Organa (Jimmy Smits) is seen piloting a starship to the planet's surface, which is shown as a mountainous, alpine region covered in snow. Landing his ship in a citadel among the mountains, he brings the newborn Leia to the royal palace and introduces her to his wife, Queen Breha. The backdrop for these scenes was created by compositing landscape footage of Grindelwald in Switzerland with CGI images of the city.

The planet is not featured in the 2016 film Rogue One, but the character Bail Organa makes an appearance, stating that he will return to Alderaan to wait for his daughter, Leia, to bring the Jedi Master Obi-Wan Kenobi. This precedes the narrative of the 1977 film, A New Hope. He dies when the Death Star destroys the planet.

=== Television ===
In an episode of the animated television series Star Wars: The Clone Wars entitled "Assassin", Ahsoka Tano has premonitions of Padmé's death on Alderaan.

The mercenary Carasynthia "Cara" Dune, in The Mandalorian, is a former Republic Shock Trooper from Alderaan, according to Moff Gideon, which she later confirms.

The planet appeared in the first and sixth episodes of the streaming series Obi-Wan Kenobi, in scenes depicting the Organa's residence and its surroundings.

=== Comics ===
The comic series Star Wars: Princess Leia (2015) deals with Princess Leia and Evaan Verlaine (a female rebel pilot also native from Alderaan), rescuing survivors from Alderaan's destruction. It also features a brief flashback to Leia's childhood on the planet and her relationship with her adoptive father Senator Bail Organa.

In Star Wars #33 (2017), Leia tells Luke that sometimes she can see Alderaan among the stars as, from certain perspectives in the galaxy, its light has not ceased to emit.

=== Books ===
"We are Alderaan. We answer rage with wisdom. We answer fear with imagination. We answer rage with hope. If one life with a single drop of Alderaanian blood survive, Alderaan survives. If one life with a passion for Alderaanian creativity survives—Alderaan survives. And we are, each of us, important. And whatever happens, I bow to all of you—and to our future." ― Leia Organa

According to the book Skywalker: A Family at War by Kristin Baver, as the son of Princess Leia, Ben Solo would have inherited the title of "Prince of Alderaan" if the planet and the royal House of Organa had not been destroyed by his grandfather, Darth Vader, and Empire prior to his birth. Upon the birth of Ben Solo, he was considered a member of the Elder Houses of the galaxy, and entitled through hereditary succession to ceremonial titles, including "Supreme Governor of Birren", a small planet settled by Alderaanian explorers in the Inner Rim of the galaxy.

According to the 2016 novel Star Wars: Bloodline by Claudia Gray, as well as the 2017 Chuck Wendig novel Star Wars: Aftermath: Empire's End, due to the destruction of Alderaan, Princess Leia gave birth to Ben on Chandrila, the home planet of Mon Mothma, as well as the temporary capital of the New Republic. Ben was born in 5 ABY, one year and four days after the Battle of Endor in the film Star Wars: Return of the Jedi (1983).

According to the 2018 novel Last Shot: A Han and Lando Novel by Daniel José Older, which features a young Ben Solo, the boy was never formally raised or invested as a "Prince of Alderaan", despite his mother leading the Alderaanian diaspora. Out of the 2 billion inhabitants on Alderaan - with the modern-day populations of China and India having about 2.8 billion people combined - about 60,000 survived the destruction of the planet due to being outside of its star system at the time. One of the survivors, Cara Dune, served as a marshal of the New Republic, presumably under Princess Leia, Ben Solo's mother, around 9 ABY. Dune is played by Gina Carano in The Mandalorian.

Although never mentioned in the series, the bulk of the surviving Alderaanens were relocated to a legacy planet known as New Alderaan by the Rebel Alliance and its successor the New Republic. This Safe World was located in the Outer Rim Territories, rather than the Core Worlds, and was largely unknown to most outsiders.

=== Legends ===
Alderaan is mentioned frequently and also serves as a location in several works in the Star Wars Expanded Universe, the collection of books, comics and other material considered outside official canon, now branded Star Wars Legends. In various stories, Alderaan is presented as the home of the characters Tycho Celchu, and of Ulic Qel Droma who fought in the Great Sith War in 4000 BBY. (Note: BBY: Before the Battle of Yavin depicted in A New Hope) In a reference to A New Hope in Star Wars: Knights of the Old Republic, the player can attempt to mislead the Sith admiral Saul Karath by giving the Jedi Enclave's location as Alderaan, before revealing that he already knew that it was based on Dantooine and destroyed by Darth Malak before the player and their party were captured.

==== Radio drama ====
The 1981 NPR/BBC radio drama adaptation of Star Wars features scenes set on Alderaan, in which Princess Leia discusses her mission to acquire the Death Star plans from agents of the Rebel Alliance with her father, Bail Organa (Prestor Organa). In a later scene, she is confronted by the Imperial commander Lord Tion and accused of treason. It is established that Alderaan has a strict policy against weapons.

==== Novels ====
In Michael A. Stackpole's 1998 novel, I, Jedi, Alderaan features as the sanctuary of the Caamasi when their home world of Caamas is devastated by the Galactic Empire.

Alderaan is featured in a 1991 role-playing game, Graveyard of Alderaan (part of Star Wars: The Roleplaying Game). It describes how, after the Clone Wars, Alderaan's massive war machine was dismantled, and the weapons were placed aboard an armory warship called Another Chance. The ship was programmed to continually jump through hyperspace until called home by the Alderanian Council. Bill Slavicsek, who wrote the game's sourcebook, later drew from it for his edition of A Guide to the Star Wars Universe.

==== Comics ====
In the Dark Horse comic Dark Empire (1991–1992), New Alderaan is a Rebel Alliance colony planet populated by Alderaanians who were off-world when Alderaan was destroyed. Mon Mothma's daughter lives there.

== Description ==
Alderaan (Core Worlds, M12) illustrated on a map of the fictional Star Wars galaxy

In Alan Dean Foster's 1976 novelization of the original film, Alderaan is described as a "small green gem of a world". The planet appears more substantially in Star Wars reference guides to fictional locations. According to Kevin J. Anderson's The Illustrated Star Wars Universe (1995) and Wallace, Kolins and McKinney's Star Wars: The Essential Guide to Planets and Moons (1998), Alderaan is covered by wild grasslands, plains, forests and mountain ranges. The planet has no ocean, but has a semi-frozen polar sea, and thousands of lakes and rivers. It is rich in biodiversity, populated by a wide variety of flora and fauna, such as the nerf and the thranta.

Human life on the planet is evidenced by a number of cities, built to harmonize with the natural environment such as on canyon walls, on stilts along the shoreline or under the polar ice. The capital city, Aldera, has been built on a small island in the center of a caldera. The Alderaanian people value arts and education highly, and place high importance on their participation in the Galactic (later Imperial) Senate and the promotion of peace through demilitarization. (Note: According to A Guide to the Star Wars Universe, which draws from the radio drama of the original film, weapons were banned after the violence of the Clone Wars.) The largely democratic society is formed as hereditary constitutional monarchy, ruled by the King or Queen of Alderaan from the Royal House of Antilles and later, due to marriage, the House of Organa. The planetary government is the High Council of Alderaan, presided over by a First Chairman and Viceroy.

== Cultural analysis ==
The destruction of Alderaan is considered by some as an artistic depiction of the danger of nuclear weapons during the Cold War and some claim it is used as a pop-culture example of inadequate political and military action leading to negative effects.

== See also ==
- List of Star Wars planets and moons
- Star Wars: The Han Solo Trilogy, Volume 3 – Rebel Dawn
- Star Wars: X-Wing, Book 4 – The Bacta War
- Atlantis
- Númenor
