= I, Jedi =

1998 novel by Michael A. Stackpole

- Author: Michael A. Stackpole
- Cover artist: Drew Struzan
- Language: English
- Series: Canon C
- Subject: Star Wars
- Genre: Science fiction
- Publisher: Bantam Spectra
- Publication date: Hardcover: May 4, 1998; Paperback: June 1, 1999
- Publication place: United States
- Media type: Hardcover & Paperback
- Pages: Hardcover: 464; Paperback: 465
- ISBN: 0-553-10820-4
- Preceded by: Isard's Revenge
- Followed by: Jedi Search

I, Jedi is a novel, written by Michael A. Stackpole that is set in the Star Wars galaxy. It was the first Star Wars novel written in the first-person perspective of a character never seen in the movies.

The novel takes place around the same time as Kevin J. Anderson's Jedi Academy Trilogy, around seven years after the events of Return of the Jedi. Like the Jedi Academy Trilogy, I, Jedi is notable in that it provides a detailed, first-hand look at the training of a Jedi Knight. The novel revisits many of the situations first presented by Anderson.

== Plot ==
In I, Jedi, Corran Horn must develop his Jedi powers to save the life of his wife, Mirax Terrik.

Corran Horn was a member of the elite X-wing force Rogue Squadron. After returning home from a long campaign to find his wife kidnapped, he turns to Luke Skywalker, the only remaining Jedi Master at the time, for help. This coincides nicely with the master's timing, as he is seeking students for his new Jedi Academy on Yavin 4. Corran knows that he is Force-sensitive, and that only with the Force as his ally can he track down his enemy.

It turns out that Corran's wife, Mirax, was tracking down a group of elusive pirates known as the Invids. The Invids' primary tactic is to drop out of hyperspace with the flagship, an Imperial Star Destroyer named the Invidious, strike, and disappear with perfect timing. As she grew closer to solving the mystery of how these pirates performed their supernaturally accurate attacks, she was kidnapped and placed into stasis on their fortress planet. On the journey to save Mirax, Corran learns that his grandfather was a Jedi, a member of the Halcyon line. His adopted grandfather shows Corran the records that the Jedi had left behind, and with that, Corran eventually makes up his mind to follow in his ancestor's footsteps and become a Jedi. After extensive training and being caught in a crisis involving the risen spirit of the Dark Sith Lord Exar Kun, Corran goes as far as he can, and infiltrates the pirates using his CorSec training. He quickly rises through the ranks, and finds out where Mirax is being held. With the timely help of Luke Skywalker and his squadron friend and wingman, Ooryl Qrygg, he fights his way past the Jensaarai, a splinter group of Jedi who focus on stealth and premonition, and into the fortress, where he is able to rescue his wife.

== Reception ==
SF Site concluded: "I, Jedi is smartly executed and fun reading, and that's one of the highest endorsements I can give." Publishers Weekly said: "Stackpole adds many engaging details and minor characters of his own to the Star Wars universe and puts his skill at telling a fluid action story on full display here."
