= Jedi Academy trilogy =

Science fiction novel series by Kevin J. Anderson

Cover of the first book

The Jedi Academy trilogy is a trilogy of science fiction novels set in the Star Wars Expanded Universe. All three books were written by Kevin J. Anderson and published in 1994. The plot takes place around seven years after the events of the 1983 film Return of the Jedi. The series chronicles Luke Skywalker's early attempts to rebuild the Jedi Order after the defeat of the Emperor. Some of the events in the trilogy are retold from a different perspective in I, Jedi by Michael A. Stackpole.

== Books ==
=== Jedi Search ===
As Luke Skywalker embarks on the initial phase of establishing an academy to educate a fresh generation of Jedi Knights, Han Solo and Chewbacca find themselves captured on the planet Kessel. Compelled to toil in the unfathomable depths of a spice mine, their circumstances become increasingly dire. Following their daring escape, Solo and Chewbacca embark on a treacherous journey to a clandestine Imperial research facility, encircled by a cluster of ominous black holes, where they encounter an even more perilous situation.

=== Dark Apprentice ===
While the New Republic struggles to decide what to do with the deadly Sun Crusher—a new doomsday weapon stolen from the Empire by Han Solo — the renegade Imperial Admiral Daala the Human uses her fleet of Star Destroyers to conduct guerrilla warfare on peaceful planets.

=== Champions of the Force ===
Kyp Durron the Human continues his rampage to destroy the Galactic Empire with the Sun Crusher to avenge his brother (whom he inadvertently kills when he destroys Carida). Luke, who was in a state of suspended animation after the fight between himself and Exar Kun the fellow Human, made every attempt he can to save his body from the evil spirit of Exar Kun. After reaching out to the Jedi twins, he warns them about the danger. In the end, all the apprentices unite and Exar Kun is destroyed.

== Legacy ==
Exar Kun was mentioned in the 2010 reference book The Jedi Path. While most existing Star Wars spin-off works were made non-canon in 2014 following the acquisition of Lucasfilm by Disney, Kun was referenced in the 2018 standalone film Solo: A Star Wars Story.
